= Ilinden–Preobrazhenie Uprising =

Anti-Ottoman revolt in the Balkans (1903)

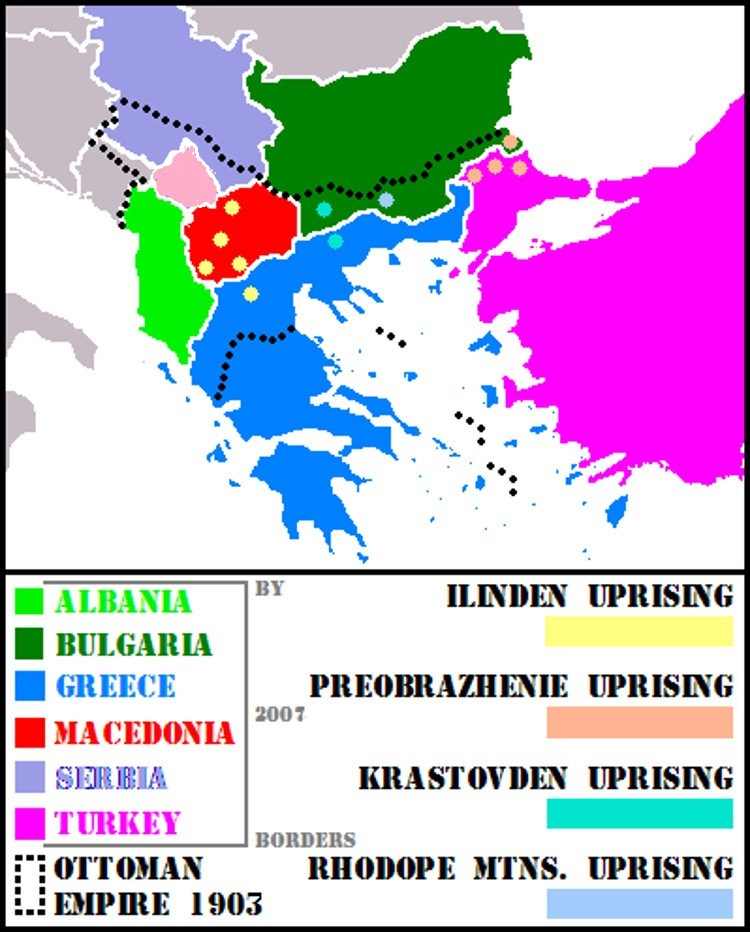
- Map of the uprising in the regions of Macedonia and Thrace, with contemporary Ottoman frontiers and present-day borders
| Date | August 2 – October 1903 |
| Location | Ottoman Empire: Manastir vilayet; Salonica vilayet; Kosovo vilayet; Adrianople vilayet |
| Result | Ottoman victory |

Belligerents
| IMARO; SMAC; Kruševo Republic; Strandzha Commune | Ottoman Empire |

Commanders and leaders
| Dame Gruev; Boris Sarafov; Nikola Karev; Georgi Sugarev; Yane Sandanski; Mihail Gerdzhikov; Lazar Madzharov; Stamat Ikonomov; Ivan Tsonchev (SMAC) | Hüseyin Hilmi Pasha; Omer Ruchidi Pasha |

Strength
| 26,408 (IMARO figures) | 350,931 (IMARO figures) |

Casualties and losses
| IMARO figures: 994 insurgents killed / wounded; 4,694 civilians killed; 3,122 girls and women raped; 176 girls and women abducted; 12,440 houses burned; 70,835 people left homeless | 5,328 killed / wounded (IMARO figures) |

The Ilinden–Preobrazhenie Uprising (Bulgarian: Илинденско-Преображенско въстание, romanized: Ilindensko-Preobrazhensko vastanie), consisting of the Ilinden Uprising (Macedonian: Илинденско востание, romanized: Ilindensko vostanie; Greek: Εξέγερση του Ίλιντεν, romanized: Exégersi tou Ílinden) and Preobrazhenie Uprising, was an organized revolt against the Ottoman Empire from August to October 1903. It was prepared and carried out by the Internal Macedonian-Adrianople Revolutionary Organization, with the support of the Supreme Macedonian-Adrianople Committee, which included mostly Bulgarian military personnel. The name of the uprising refers to Ilinden, a name for Elijah's day, and to Preobrazhenie which means Feast of the Transfiguration.

The uprisings had as an aim the autonomy for Macedonia and Adrianople regions. The Ilinden Uprising in the region of Macedonia started on August 2 (New style). It affected the Manastir vilayet, where it was organized by Macedonian Bulgarians, joined mainly by some Patriarchist Macedonian Slavs (called Grecomans and Serbomans), and some Patriarchist and Exarchist Aromanians and Albanians. A provisional government was established in the town of Kruševo, proclaimed as the Kruševo Republic. The republic was overrun after ten days by the Ottoman forces. On August 19 (New style), the closely related Preobrazhenie Uprising, organized by Thracian Bulgarian revolutionaries in the Adrianople vilayet, led to the liberation of a large area in the Strandzha Mountains, and the creation of a provisional government in Vassiliko, the Strandzha Republic. This lasted 26 days before being put down by the Ottomans. The insurrection also affected the vilayet of Kosovo and the Salonica vilayet.

By the time the rebellion had started, many of its most promising potential leaders, including Ivan Garvanov and Gotse Delchev, had already been arrested or killed by the Ottomans. The general staff of the uprising attempted to provoke an intervention by the Great Powers, by sending them a letter and a memorandum in which they informed about the atrocities committed by the Ottomans, but the Great Powers proceeded their status quo policy. Towards the end of the uprising when it was evidently clear that there will be no intervention, a desperate call was made to convince the Bulgarian government to send the army against the Ottomans, but the government was pressured by the Great Powers to refrain from military intervention. The revolutionaries managed to maintain a guerrilla campaign against the Ottomans for almost three months, but the uprising was suppressed. This was followed by a mass wave of refugees from the regions of Macedonia and Thrace, mostly to Bulgaria, but also to the United States and Canada. Its greater effect was that it persuaded the European powers to attempt to convince the Ottoman sultan that he must take a more conciliatory attitude toward his Christian subjects in Europe. Through bilateral agreement, signed in 1904, Bulgaria committed not to support the revolutionary movement, while the Ottomans undertook to implement the Mürzsteg Reforms, though neither happened.

The uprising is celebrated in both Bulgaria and North Macedonia as the peak of their nations' struggle against the Ottoman rule. In Bulgaria it is considered as a general rebellion prepared by the joint revolutionary organization of the Bulgarians in the Ottoman Empire, with a common goal autonomy for Macedonia and Adrianople regions, and later unification with Bulgaria. While in North Macedonia, only the Ilinden uprising is acknowledged, which has been seen there as exclusively Macedonian. Calls for common celebrations, especially from the Bulgarian side, did little to change this state of affairs.

== Prelude ==
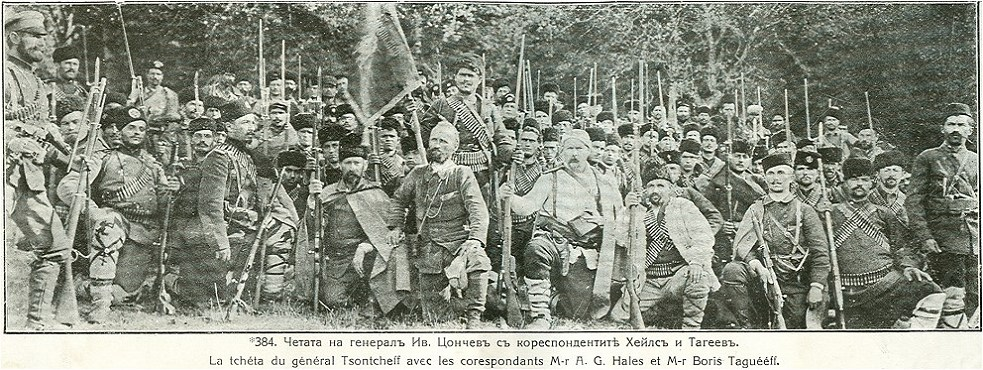
General Ivan Tsonchev's Supreme Committee's band

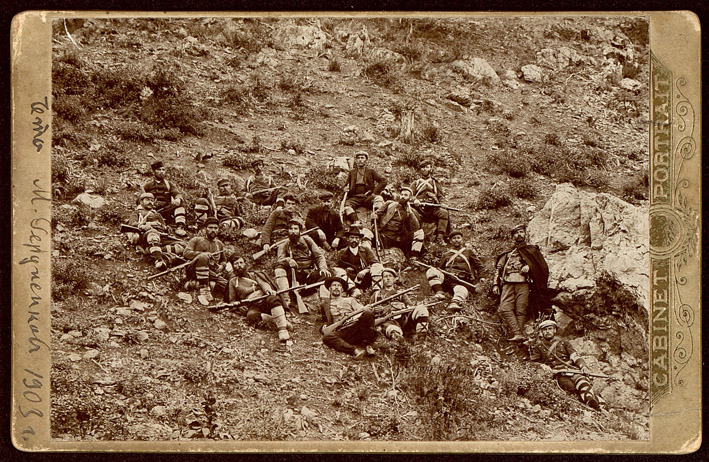
Voivodes in Adrianople vilayet before the uprising.

The competition for control between national groups took place largely via of propaganda campaigns in the Ottoman Empire, aimed at winning over the local population, and conducted largely through churches and schools. Various groups were also supported by the local population and the three competing governments.

The Internal Macedonian-Adrianopolitan Revolutionary Organization (IMARO) was founded in Thessaloniki in 1893. The group had a number of name changes prior to and subsequent to the uprising. It was predominantly Bulgarian and supported an idea for autonomy for Macedonia and Adrianople regions within the Ottoman state with a motto of "Macedonia for the Macedonians". IMARO's inspiration certainly belonged to the nineteenth-century Balkan practice whereby the powers maintained the fiction of Ottoman control over effectively independent states under the guise of autonomous status within the Ottoman state; (Serbia, 1829–1878; Romania, 1829–1878; Bulgaria, 1878–1908). Autonomy, in other words, was as good as independence. Moreover, from the Macedonian perspective, the goal of independence by autonomy had another advantage. More important, IMARO was aware that neither Serbia nor Greece could expect to obtain the whole of Macedonia and, unlike Bulgaria, they both looked forward to and urged partition. Autonomy, then, was the best prophylactic against partition, that would unite the multi-ethnic Macedonian population. However, the idea of Macedonian autonomy was strictly political and did not imply a secession from Bulgarian ethnicity.

The Supreme Macedonian-Adrianople Committee (SMAC) was a group formed in 1895 in Sofia, Bulgaria, which enjoyed the covert but close cooperation with the Bulgarian government. The members of this group were called the Supremists, and advocated annexation of the region by Bulgaria. The two groups had different strategies. IMARO sought to prepare a carefully planned uprising in the future, but the Supremists preferred immediate raids and guerilla operations to foster disorder and a precipitate intervention from the Great Powers. A leader of IMARO, Gotse Delchev, was a strong advocate for proceeding slowly. SMAC urged a speedy uprising although they had little faith in the internal movement. Their president Danail Nikolaev thought that IMARO's idea for a peasant uprising was unreal and perceived Delchev as a "brash youngster". Nikolaev thought that for the struggle to succeed, trained soldiers were needed and also clandestine aid and finance of the Bulgarian government.

On the other hand, a smaller group of conservatives in Thessaloniki organized a Bulgarian Secret Revolutionary Brotherhood (Balgarsko Tayno Revolyutsionno Bratstvo). The latter was incorporated in IMARO by 1900 and its members as Ivan Garvanov, were to exert a significant influence on the organization. They were to push for the Ilinden–Preobrazhenie Uprising and later became the core of IMARO's right-wing faction. In 1899, Garvanov developed a friendship with Supremists' new leader Boris Sarafov, through which Garvanov managed to come to eminence in IMARO. Despite the mutual hostility, in this period IMARO and the Supremists collaborated and with Sarafov's help Garvanov and some of the Supremists became members of the IMARO's central committee in Thessaloniki.

At the beginning of 1901, the arrested IMARO member Milan Mihaylov, previously member of SMAC and assigned to IMARO on Sarafov's suggestion, revealed the names of other IMARO activists. As a result, a series of arrests were conducted, which would become known as the Salonica affair. Consequently many of the leaders of IMARO were arrested by the Ottomans, including the Central Committee members, others like Delchev took refuge in Bulgaria. In panic that IMARO would collapse, the Central Committee member Ivan Hadzhinikolov, before his arrest, gave the archive and accounts to Garvanov. In this way Garvanov took control of the Central Committee and became its leader. Allegedly the imprisoned IMARO leaders were betrayed by Garvanov in order for him to seize control, thus in the following period the Central Committee was a tool of Garvanov and the Supremists, and plans for the uprising began. From January 15 to 17, 1903, Garvanov held an IMARO congress in Thessaloniki in order to promote the idea for an uprising that spring. The representative of the Serres revolutionary district was firmly against, however to gain a positive answer, the participation at the congress was cautiously selected. After heated discussions, all the delegates present signed the protocol with an opinion on starting an uprising. During this period, Racho Petrov's Bulgarian government supported IMARO's position that the rebellion was entirely internal. As well as Petrov's personal warning to Delchev in January 1903 to delay or even cancel the rebellion, the government sent out a circular note to its diplomatic representatives in Thessaloniki, Bitola and Edirne, advising the population not to succumb to pro-rebellion propaganda, as "Bulgaria was not ready to support it". Also, the IMARO was warned by the Minister of War Mihail Savov, that the uprising must be postponed until May 1904, by which time the Bulgarian Army would be ready for military intervention. Prior to the uprising, the Bulgarian government had been required to outlaw the Macedonian rebel groups and sought the arrest of its leaders. This was a condition of diplomacy with Russia.

The decision to start an uprising was final, but Garvanov wanted to discuss it with the other top people of the organization, therefore, in mid-January, he arrived in Sofia. There, the decision on starting an uprising was discussed with Gotse Delchev, Gyorche Petrov, Pere Toshev, Hristo Matov, Hristo Tatarchev, Mihail Gerdzhikov, and others. It became clear that among the top people of the organization there was no unanimity on this issue, but eventually everyone accepted the idea. However, Delchev remained strongly at the position that they were not ready, he went to the Serres region where he met with Yane Sandanski with whom he always agreed in matters of ideology and he shared his view. Later he went to Thessaloniki for a meeting with Dame Gruev, who Delchev hoped that as a "heart of the organization" would argue for the postponement of the uprising, but Gruev wanted it to proceed and defended the moral inspiration of the decision. In late April 1903, a group of young anarchists from the Gemidzhii Circle – graduates from the Bulgarian Men's High School of Thessaloniki launched a campaign of terror bombing, the so-called Thessaloniki bombings of 1903. Their aim was to attract the attention of the Great Powers to Ottoman oppression in Macedonia and Eastern Thrace. The attacks were followed by reprisals by the Ottoman army and bashibozouks (irregulars) in the countryside, and more IMARO members were arrested. Delchev himself was killed by the Ottomans in May 1903.

The congress of Smilevo took place from May 2 to 7, 1903. The decision from January to stage an uprising was debated. 50 delegates, representing eight revolutionary districts, participated in the sessions of the congress. The delegates decided that Ottoman buildings should be occupied, the means of communication (roads, telegraphs) should be paralyzed, etc. The Manastir vilayet, which was best prepared, was chosen as the center of the uprising. The congress ordered the formation of chetas consisting of 30 to 50 revolutionaries. The Bitola revolutionary region was split into districts, each headed by a voivode. A General Staff consisting of Dame Gruev, Boris Sarafov and Anastas Lozanchev, was elected. The General Staff made the decision that preparation for the uprising had to be finished by the end of May. There were setbacks during the preparations because in the kaza of Kastoria the Patriarchists under the leadership of the metropolitan, Germanos Karavangelis, had formed an anti-Bulgarian front. In all revolutionary districts, the voivodes organized the storage of supplies which were hidden in the mountains. Medicines were bought from cities. Participants had to take a course of military training. During May, Gruev and Sarafov, accompanied by chetas, visited the Monastir vilayet to verify that all their instructions (such as storage of supplies) were being followed. The General Staff set August 2, Elijah's day (July 20 in the Julian calendar), as the date of the uprising. On July 11 (June 28 in the Julian calendar), 1903, a congress was held in Petrova Niva. 47 delegates, which were guarded by several hundred men, participated in the sessions for four days. They decided to revolt in Adrianople on August 19 (August 6 in the Julian calendar), on the feast of the Transfiguration.

Garvanov, himself, was arrested by the Ottomans. The aim of the uprising was to cause the Great Powers to intervene and to gain autonomy for the regions of Macedonia and Adrianople. Old Russian Berdan and Krnka rifles as well as Mannlichers were supplied from Bulgaria to Skopje following the demand for higher rates of fire by Bulgarian army officer Boris Sarafov. In his memoir, Sarafov wrote that the main source of funds for the purchase of the weapons from the Bulgarian army came from the funds of the kidnapping of Miss Stone, as well as from contacts in Europe. Many Mauser rifles were gained from killed Ottoman soldiers as well.

== Ilinden Uprising ==
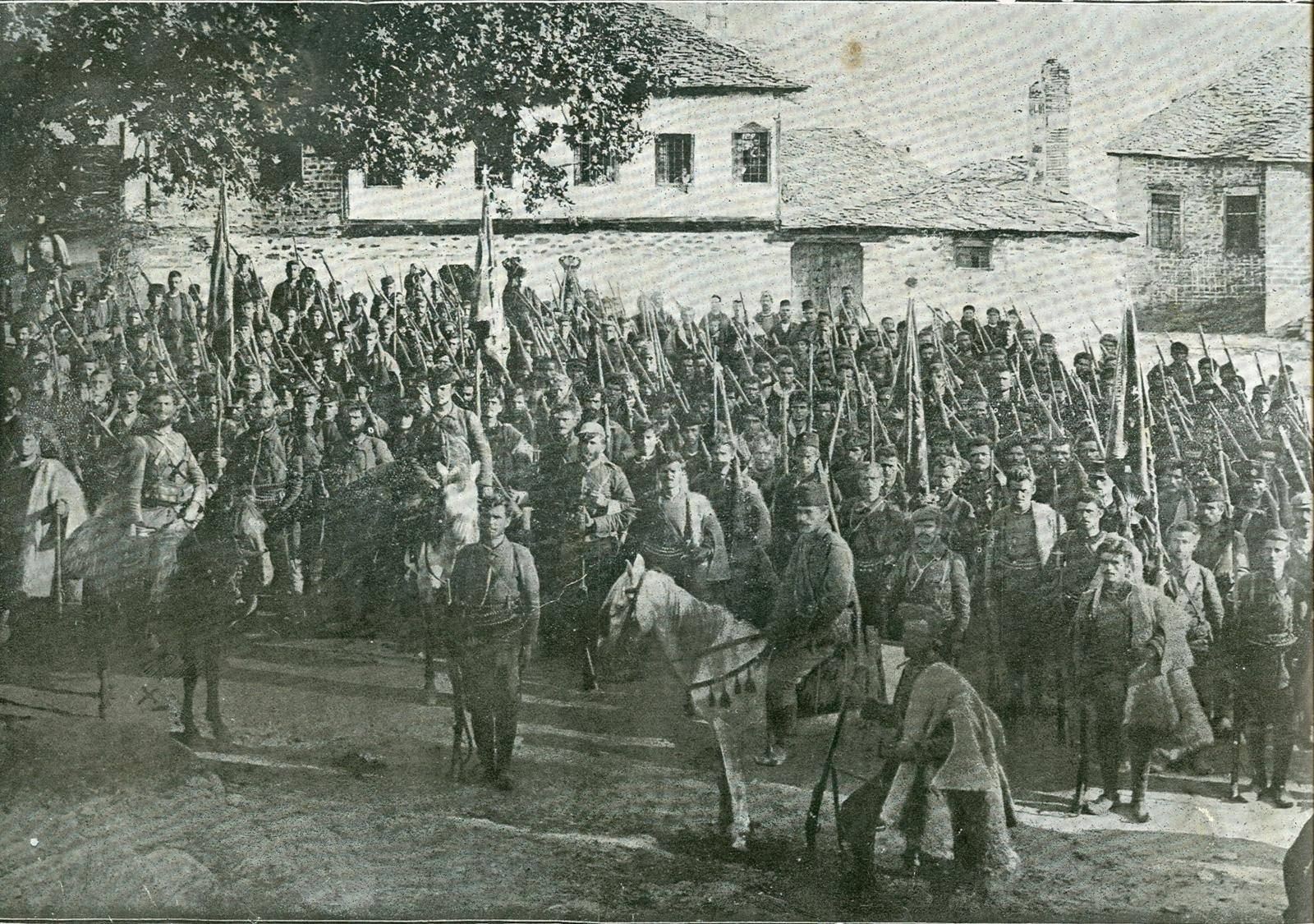
Unified chetas during the capture of Kleisoura.

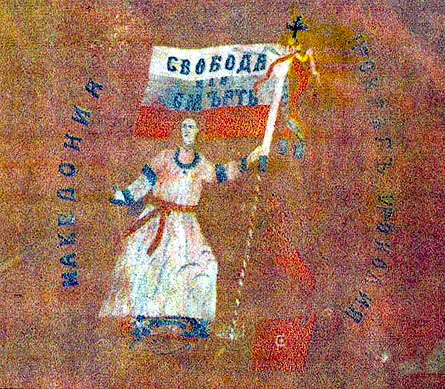
The banner of the insurgents from Ohrid with Bulgarian flag on it and the inscription Свобода или смърть ( "Freedom or Death")

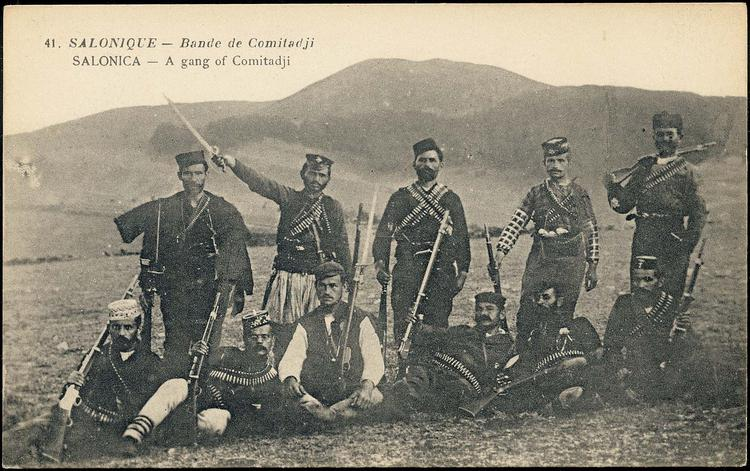
The Kruševo headquarters, among them are Nikola Karev, Todor Hristov and Antinogen Hadzhov (second, fourth and fifth from right to left in the down row).

On July 28, in the Bitola revolutionary region, instructions and proclamations for the people were sent to the voivodes. The uprising began on August 2, in the Manastir vilayet. The uprising was chosen in the Manastir vilayet allegedly because it was located the farthest from Bulgaria, attempting to showcase to the Great Powers that the uprising was purely of a Macedonian character and phenomenon. Per one of the founders of IMARO – Petar Poparsov, the idea to keep distance from Bulgaria, was because any suspicion of its interference could harm both sides: Bulgaria and the organization. The telegraph lines to Bitola were cut. The Bulgarians announced the beginning of the uprising by setting the haystacks of Muslim peasants on fire in the villages near Bitola. An attack on Resen failed. That night and early the next morning, the town of Kruševo was attacked and captured by 800 rebels who were led by the locals Nikola Karev and Pitu Guli. The insurgents set the administrative offices on fire. 12 government officials were killed, along with Patriarchists who were accused of being Ottoman spies. Most of the soldiers of the small garrison, consisting of almost 60 men, were captured or killed. After their victory, the insurgents raised the flag of IMARO, bearing a cross on one side and the other side had the slogan "Freedom or Death." On August 3, the telephone communications were cut in the kazas of Monastir, Ohrid, Prilep, Kastoria and Florina. The insurgents several times attempted to blow up the railroad which passed through Bitola and compelled the authorities to place a military guard along the railroad. On August 4, under the leadership of Karev, a local administration called Kruševo Republic had been set up. That same day and the next, Ottoman troops made unsuccessful attempts to retake Kruševo. On the same day, several chetas, consisting of 400 men, led by four voivodes, captured the town of Kleisoura. The village of Smilevo was captured by insurgents and became the headquarters.

The uprising was led by IMARO and SMAC. The number of insurgents has been estimated as 26,000. After the eruption of the uprising, IMARO's leaders sent a declaration to the Great Powers, writing:

Unpunished violence by the Muslims and systematic administrative persecutions have forced the Christians of Macedonia and the vilayet of Adrianople to take up arms for the purpose of resistance. They have resorted to this extreme action only after exhausting all peaceful means to call the intervention of Europe in accord with the treaties which regulate the condition of these populations.

IMARO also appealed for the nomination of a Christian governor independent from the Ottoman Empire and a collective international control on a permanent basis. Insurgents also burned houses and crops on 11 Ottoman estates. The uprising began with attacks on Turks and Albanians. In the kaza of Bitola, they burned the fields in villages like Ramna, Lera, Bratin Dol, etc. Attacks on Muslims also occurred in the kazas of Florina, Kastoria and Demir Hisar. Most of the Ottoman troops were stationed in the Kosovo vilayet. Many Muslims in the Manastir vilayet had to organize their self-defense. In the areas of Ohrid and Debar, Muslims from the villages that had been attacked in the beginning of the uprising counter-attacked. Turks and Albanians from the villages Dolenci, Lera and Ramna destroyed the village Šrpce.

During the uprising, IMARO won some popular support due to its promises to abolish peasant debts and redistribute land. Peasants took part in the uprising. Sometimes peasants harbored the insurgents or gave them food. Women supplied the insurgents with food and ammunition, while children carried messages. Aromanians (Vlachs) took an active part in the revolutionary struggle. There were Bulgarian sentiments among the insurgents, who flew Bulgarian flags everywhere and sang Bulgarian marching songs. These acts resulted in the insurgents being associated with Bulgaria. Sultan Abdul Hamid, after hearing about the uprising while he was in Istanbul, sent Omer Ruschi Pasha and 12 battalions into the Manastir vilayet to suppress it. The Ottoman authorities also tried to depict the uprising as a "marginal action of some Bulgarian terrorists" to the European public. On August 9, IMARO sent a memorandum to the representatives of the Great Powers in Sofia, describing the destruction by the Ottoman forces. On August 11, in Gevgelija in the Salonica vilayet, a bridge further away from the station was bombed, as well as that between Florina and Kinali. On August 12, following the Battle of Sliva and the Battle of Mečkin Kamen, a force of 18,000 Ottoman soldiers recaptured and burned Kruševo. A Muslim militia from the area of Pribilci took part in the pillaging of Kruševo. 117 people were killed, 150 women and girls were raped, 159 houses and 210 shops were burnt.

On August 14, rebels under the leadership of Nikola Pushkarov, attacked and derailed a military train near Skopje. At the same time, insurgents destroyed all the wooden bridges on the roads of Gradsko, Kičevo, Kruševo and Veles. The chetas then simultaneously attacked the military outposts and small garrisons across the vilayet of Manastir. Other regions involved in the uprising included Ohrid, Giannitsa, Gevgelija, Tikveš and Kratovo. In the Thessaloniki region, operations were much more limited and without much local involvement, due in part to disagreements between the factions of IMARO. There was also no uprising in the Prilep area, immediately to the east of Bitola. Kostadina Boyadzhieva and other female teachers from Ohrid opened a hospital during the uprising. The hospital was located in an old archbishopric building in Ohrid's Varoš district. The Ottoman authorities discovered the hospital and imprisoned the women for actions against the state. However, because of the lack of supporting evidence, the authorities released them after a brief imprisonment, after the women had endured beatings from the authorities. Greek diplomats tried discreetly assisting Ottoman efforts to suppress the rebellion.

The uprising spread to the adjacent vilayets of Kosovo, Thessaloniki and Adrianople (in Thrace). In the Kosovo vilayet, the uprising was confined to the southern part because IMARO's leaders did not want any confrontations with the local Albanians. IMARO's committees were also not as present in the vilayet as they were in Manastir. Contemporary reports of the British diplomats stationed in Thessaloniki, Bitola and Skopje to their Istanbul embassy described the participants of the uprising as "Bulgarian insurgents" closely linked to the Bulgarian Exarchate and that the uprising was the work of the "Bulgarian Macedonians". Alfred Rappoport, the Austrian consul general in Skopje, referred to "Macedonian cause" and "Macedonian fighters", arguing that they had the goal to achieve "Macedonian-Bulgarian autonomy", leading to an independent "Macedonian state", and that they were allied, not subordinated, to Bulgaria. However, he acknowledged that the majority of the leaders were "Bulgarians".

=== Krastovden Uprising ===
Some historians describe the rebellion in the Serres revolutionary district as Krastovden Uprising (Holy Cross Day Uprising), because on September 14 the revolutionaries there also rebelled. Rebel chetas active in the regions of Pirin Macedonia and Serres, led by Yane Sandanski, and chetas of the Supreme Committee led by Ivan Tsonchev and Anastas Yankov, engaged in battles with the large Turkish forces. The fighting began in the Melnik region even before the planned date on the Feast of the Cross (Krastovden in Bulgarian, September 27) day and lasted until October 21, the local population was not involved as much as in other regions. In the Razlog Valley the population joined in the uprising.

In areas encompassing the uprising of 1903, Albanian villagers were in a situation of being either under threat from IMARO chetas or recruited by Ottoman authorities to end the uprising.

== Preobrazhenie Uprising and Rhodope Mountains Uprising ==
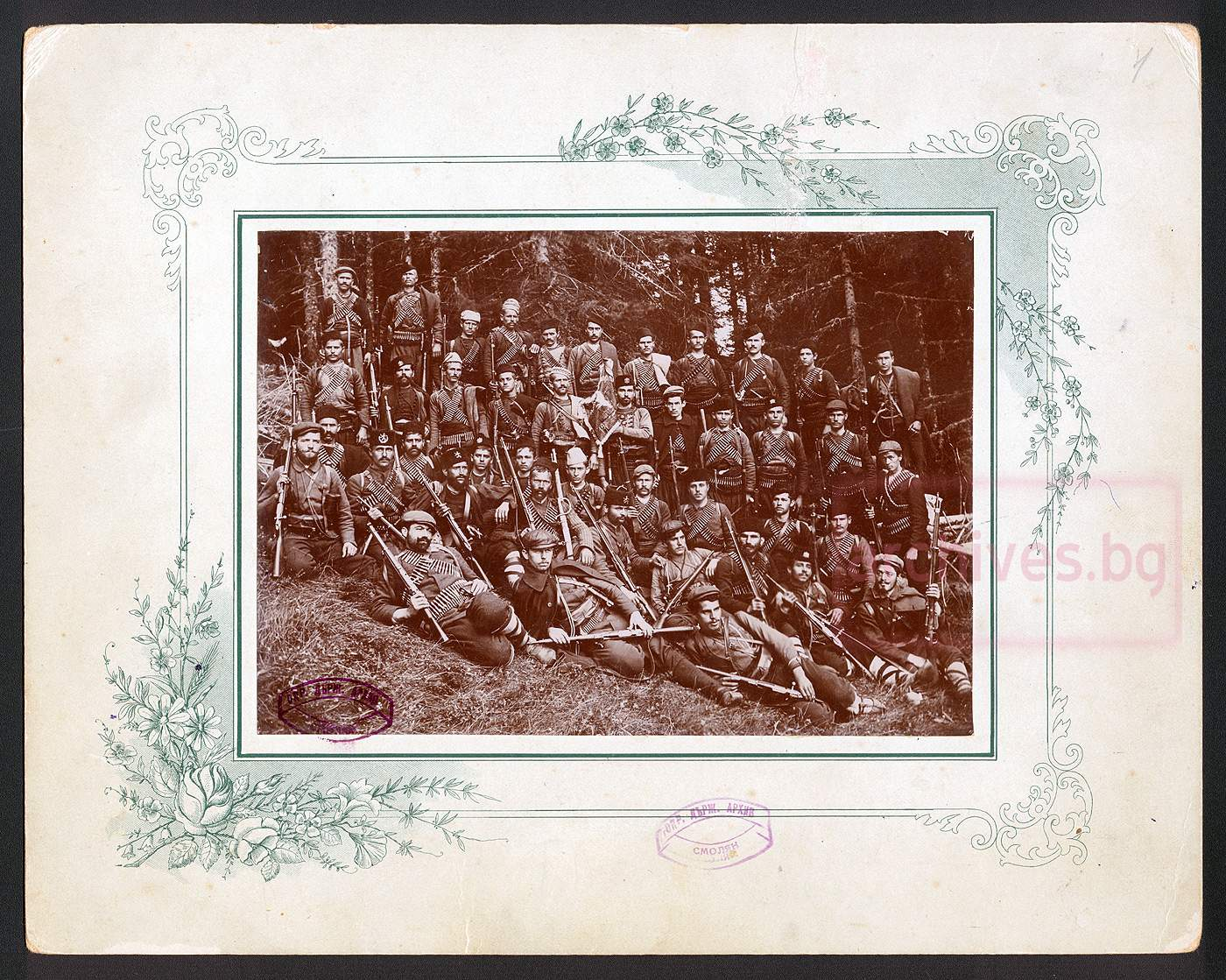
The delegates at Rhodope Mountains congress.

On August 19, a revolt by Bulgarians began in the Ottoman province of Adrianople. Mihail Gerdzhikov, Georgi Kondolov, Stamat Ikonomov, and Lazar Madzharov were the commanders in this district. The insurgents proclaimed a "Republic of Strandzha", which was named after the local mountain range.

According to Khadzhiev, the main goal of the uprising in Thrace was to give support to the uprisings further west, by engaging Ottoman troops and preventing them from moving into Macedonia. Many of the operations were diversionary, though several villages were taken, and a region in Strandzha was held for around twenty days. According to Khadzhiev, "there was never a question of state power in the Thrace region." It was decided to attack Malko Tarnovo, whose attack, however, failed. Despite this, many of the regional villages were captured, after which Tsarevo and Ahtopol fell into the hands of the insurgents. Subsequently, a strong army advanced into the region. Ottoman military units carried out a planned offensive against the insurgents, including a marine landing. Thus, the rebels were attacked from two sides and their units were defeated.

In the Rhodope Mountains, Western Thrace, the uprising was expressed only in some cheta's diversions in the regions of Smolyan and Dedeagach.

== Suppression ==
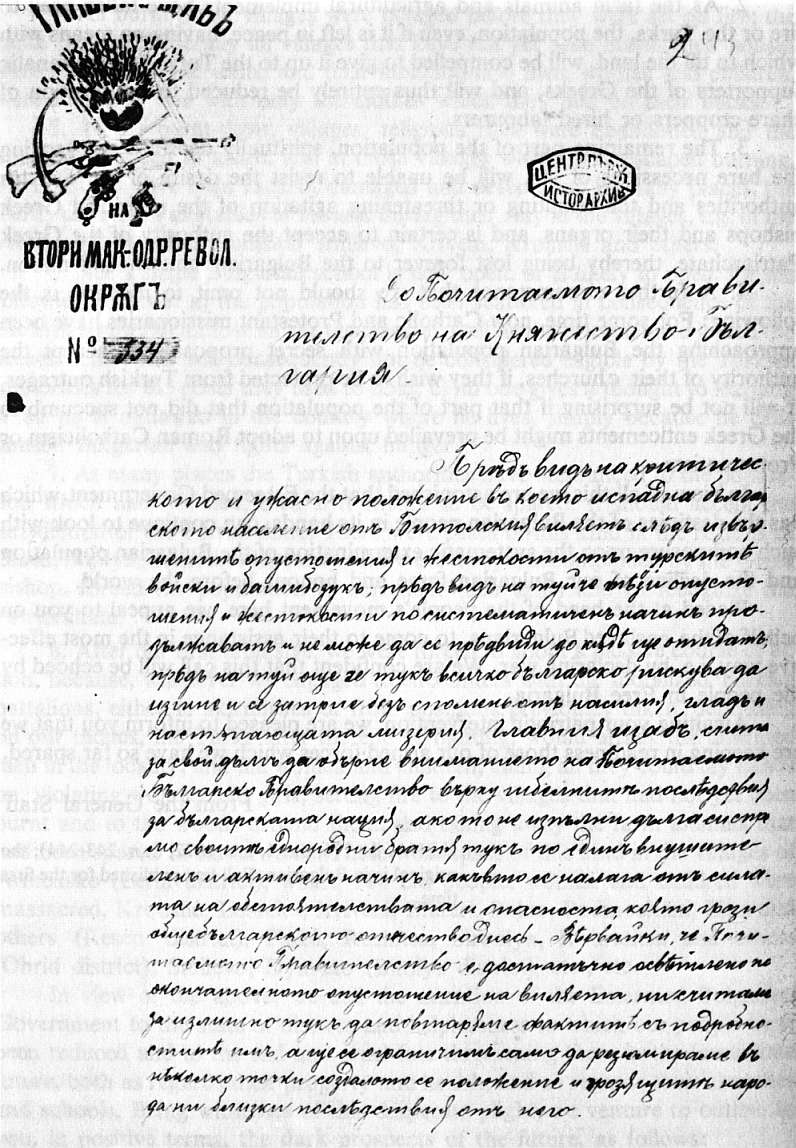
Letter from the General Staff of the Second Macedonian-Adrianople Revolutionary Region to the Bulgarian Government, requesting military intervention for the salvation of the local Bulgarians.

In mid-August, the Anatolian forces, from the vilayet of Kosovo, along with Albanian militia units as supporting forces, were sent to Macedonia to suppress the uprising. Around 40 battalions came to reinforce the troops. On August 24, Omer Ruschi Pasha was replaced by Nasir Pasha, who launched a massive offensive on the same day. He divided his army into five detachments. His soldiers surrounded every zone controlled by the insurgents. The soldiers systematically burned and destroyed Christian villages. The villages were usually burned by Albanian irregulars. They were burnt on Hilmi Pasha's order. At the end of August, two columns of troops recaptured Smilevo and Kleisoura.

In Sofia, Athens, and Belgrade, meetings were organized by writers, academics, and various Macedonian associations. These meetings condemned the "massacres of Christians" by Ottoman soldiers and the "timidity of European diplomacy", which was called to intervene against the Ottoman Empire. Some chetas crossed into Bulgaria, others surrendered to the Ottoman forces. After failing to attract the intervention of the Great Powers, on September 9, the General Staff of the Uprising sent a desperate letter to the Bulgarian government, appealing for immediate armed intervention:

"Due to the critical and frightening situation to which the population of Bitolia [Monastir] vilayet is subjected by the devastation and atrocities committed by the Turkish army and the Bashi-Bazouks... the staff feels obligated to attract the attention of the honorable Bulgarian government to the disastrous consequences to the Bulgarian nation if it does not accomplish its duty towards the blood brothers of in this region here.... Placed at the head of popular movement here, we address to you in the name of the Bulgarian Slavs, asking you to help us in the most efficient manner, by war."

In the beginning of October, SMAC sent bands into the northern parts of the Sanjak of Serres to relieve the insurgents, but failed. Many of the locals were hostile to these chetas. Bulgaria was unable to send troops to the rescue of the rebelling fellow Bulgarians in Macedonia and Adrianople (Thrace). When IMARO representatives met the Bulgarian Prime-Minister Racho Petrov, he showed them the ultimatums by Serbia, Greece and Romania, which he had just received and which informed him of those countries' support for the Ottoman Empire, in case Bulgaria intervened to support the rebels. The Great Powers also pressured Bulgaria to not intervene. At a meeting in early October, the general staff of the rebel forces decided to cease all revolutionary activities, and declared the forces, with the exception of regular militias, as disbanded. The peasants began to return home. Many surrendered to Ottoman authorities. During the first week of October, 1,700 rifles were returned to the vali of Manastir. The uprising was suppressed by the end of October.

== Aftermath ==
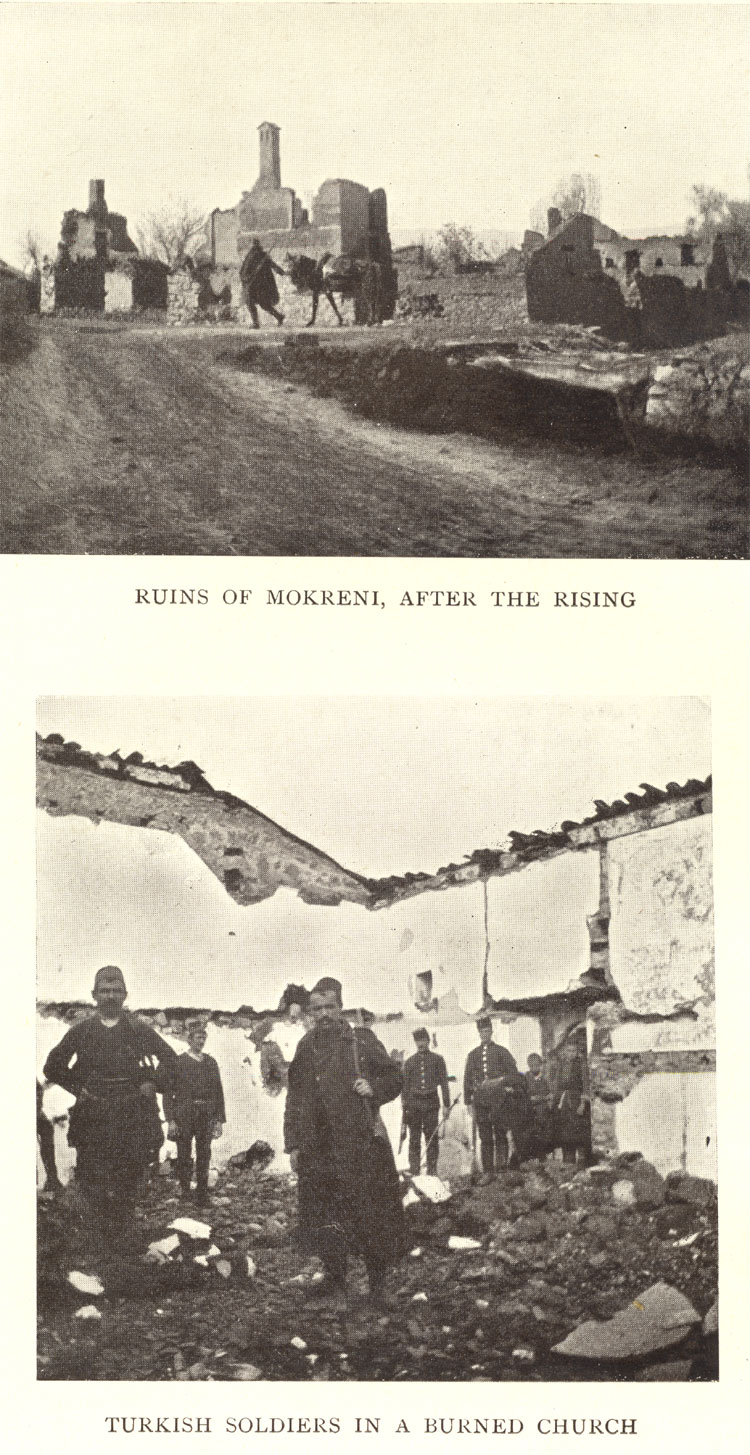
Ruins of the village of Mokreni after the uprising.

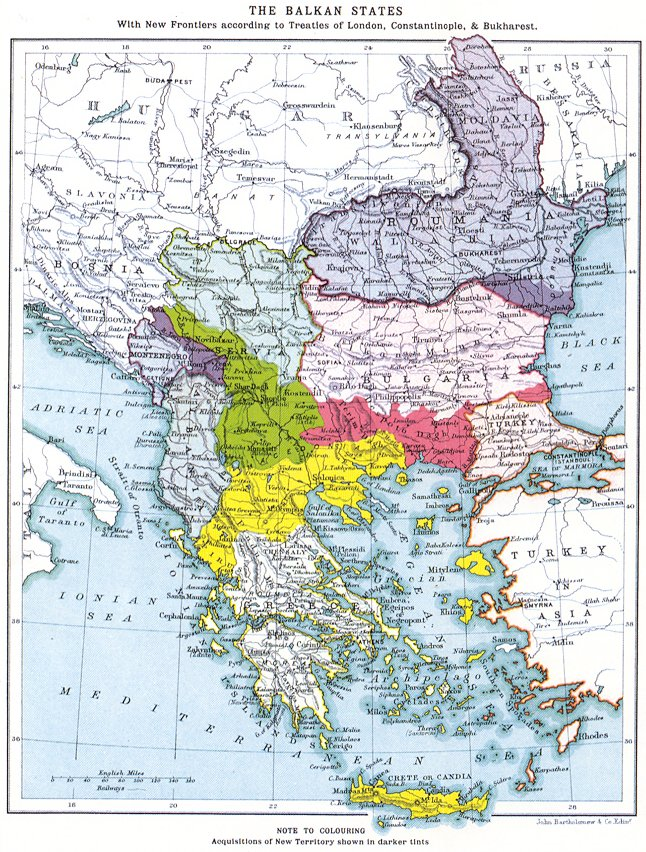
The partition of Macedonia and Thrace in 1913.

A reason for the failure of the uprising was the absence of outside support by the Great Powers and neighboring countries. Another reason was because they were insufficiently prepared in terms of preparation (training, strategy and planning) and the insufficient weapons they had. According to Bulgarian figures, 9,830 houses were burned down and 60,953 people were left homeless. After the suppression of the uprising, 30,000 Bulgarian Christians from Ottoman Macedonia and Thrace went to the Principality of Bulgaria. Half of these refugees came from Eastern Thrace. An IMARO memorandum issued in 1904 made the following estimates: 5,000 casualties, 205 villages burned down, 70,000 homeless, 30,000 refugees to Bulgaria and the United States. According to Georgi Khadzhiev, 201 villages and 12,400 houses were burned, 4,694 people killed, with some 30,000 refugees fleeing to Bulgaria. 2,500 people were killed in Thrace. In Bulgaria, the movement of refugees was taken care of by the government and Slavic charity societies. Relief missions were organized and sent to the affected villages. Around 1,000 insurgents were killed. Relief organizations estimated more than 4,500 dead, with 200 villages destroyed by Ottoman forces, during and after the uprising. At least 3,000 rapes were reported, and more than 100,000 people were left homeless for the winter.

The uprising did succeed in bringing the intervention of the Great Powers, to some extent. In October, Franz Joseph of Austria-Hungary and Nicholas II of Russia met at Mürzsteg and sponsored the Mürzsteg program of reforms, which provided for foreign policing of the Macedonia region, financial compensation for victims, and establishment of ethnic boundaries in the region. The Mürzsteg Agreement was reached on October 2, 1903, which was accepted reluctantly by Abdul Hamid on November 25. Writing after the uprising in 1903, Krste Misirkov called it a "complete fiasco" and argued that the main reason why the uprising failed was due to its "Bulgarian bias", although he also argued that it "prevented Macedonia from being partitioned" and it did signal the beginning of growing Macedonian Slav self-awareness. He also wrote: "The only Macedonian Slavs who played a leading part in the uprising were those who called themselves Bulgarians", while also expressing the sentiment that due to the uprising, "Macedonia has become lost to the Bulgarian nation". In 1904, Bulgaria signed a treaty with the Ottoman Empire. Both parties promised to police their common borders more effectively. It also enabled Bulgaria to secure the release of all political prisoners of the Ilinden uprising. All political prisoners, including participants and organizers of the Ilinden uprising, were released. However, Bulgaria covertly supported the former prisoners. Through the Bulgarian-Ottoman agreement, Bulgaria promised to refrain from helping the guerrilla units in Macedonia, while the Ottoman Empire promised to implement the Mürzsteg Reforms. Neither happened.

As soon as order appeared to be re-established, international aid was organized. France permitted the communities of Lazarites and the Daughters of Charity (already established in Macedonia) to help the victims of the uprising. In coordination with the English and American Protestant missions, French religious organizations distributed food supplies, blankets, and clothing in the Manastir vilayet. In 1904, Bulgarian women's organizations were appealing to the consulates of the Great Powers to secure the release of Bulgarian women who were arrested by the Ottoman authorities due to their participation in the Ilinden uprising. British anthropologist Edith Durham, who visited Macedonia after the Ilinden uprising as a member of the British Relief Mission, described the uprising as purely Bulgarian, while also claiming that the purpose of the uprising was "to make Big Bulgaria, not Great Serbia." A year after the uprising, many of the refugees had returned. The Ottoman inspectorate kept registers of Bulgarian teachers, including their names, places of birth, past appointments, and any information on their ties to the IMARO. If the administrative council of a village could not vouch for the character of a teacher and report their location, the teacher would be not allowed to work and remain in their place of birth.

In the beginning of 1904, the Bitola Regional Committee of IMARO ordered voivodes of southern Macedonia to forcibly convert the Patriarchist villages to the Exarchate. In a couple of weeks, around 40 villages had been forcibly converted. This policy was opposed by Gyorche Petrov, but the Regional Congress in Bitola in the summer of 1904 overruled objections. In 1904, the Bulgarian government used its control over the Supremists to assume authority over IMARO. However, this resulted in IMARO splitting into a right-wing headed by Ivan Garvanov and Boris Sarafov, which favored a pro-Bulgarian stance and a left-wing headed by Yane Sandanski, which favored an independent Macedonia as part of a future Balkan Federation. The Greek government decided to sponsor paramilitary activities in Ottoman Macedonia. Greek and Serbian bands used the weakening of Bulgarian activity to strengthen themselves and staged a series of attacks in Macedonia. The two wings engaged in outright conflict which meant mafia-style killings on a larger scale. In this style, Garvanov and Sarafov were assassinated in 1907 by Todor Panitsa on the order of Sandanski.

The Balkan Wars of 1912 and 1913 subsequently split up Macedonia and Thrace. Serbia took a portion of Macedonia in the north, which roughly corresponds to North Macedonia. Greece took south Macedonia, and Bulgaria was only able to obtain a small region in the northeast, Pirin Macedonia. The Ottomans managed to keep the Adrianople region, where the whole Thracian Bulgarian population was subjected to ethnic cleansing by the Ottoman Empire. The rest of Thrace was divided between Bulgaria, Greece and Turkey following World War I and the Greco-Turkish War. Most of the local Bulgarian political and cultural figures were persecuted or expelled from Serbian and Greek parts of Macedonia and Thrace, where all structures of the Bulgarian Exarchate were abolished. Thousands of Macedonian Slavs left for Bulgaria. Some fled after the Greeks burned Kilkis, during the Second Balkan War, and the Treaty of Neuilly population exchange between Greece and Bulgaria saw 92,000 Bulgarians exchanged with 46,000 Greeks from Bulgaria. Bulgarian (including the Macedonian dialects) was prohibited, and its surreptitious use, whenever detected, was ridiculed or punished.

== Legacy ==
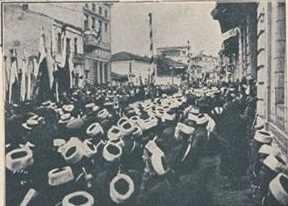
Celebration of the Ilinden Uprising in Bitola during WWI Bulgarian occupation of Southern Serbia.

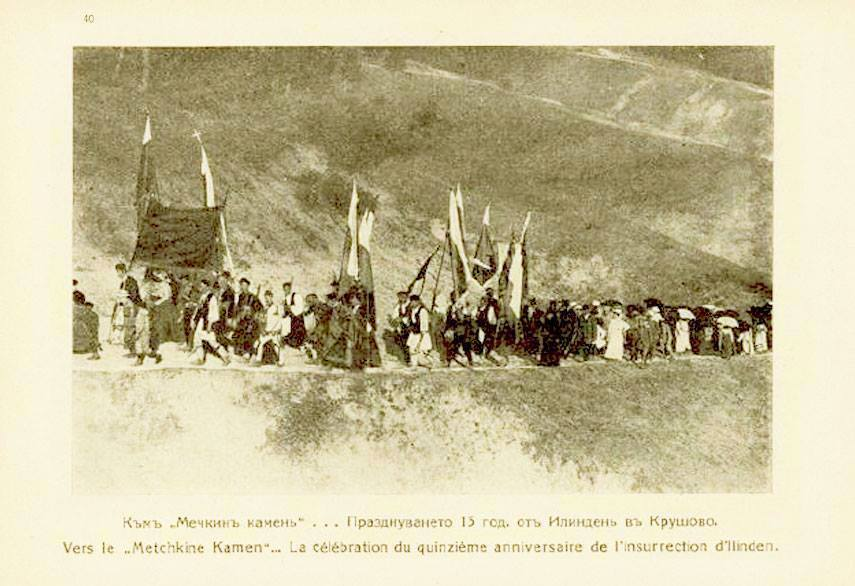
Procession organized by the mayor of Kruševo, the IMRO komitadji Naum Tomalevski, marking the anniversary of the Uprising in 1918

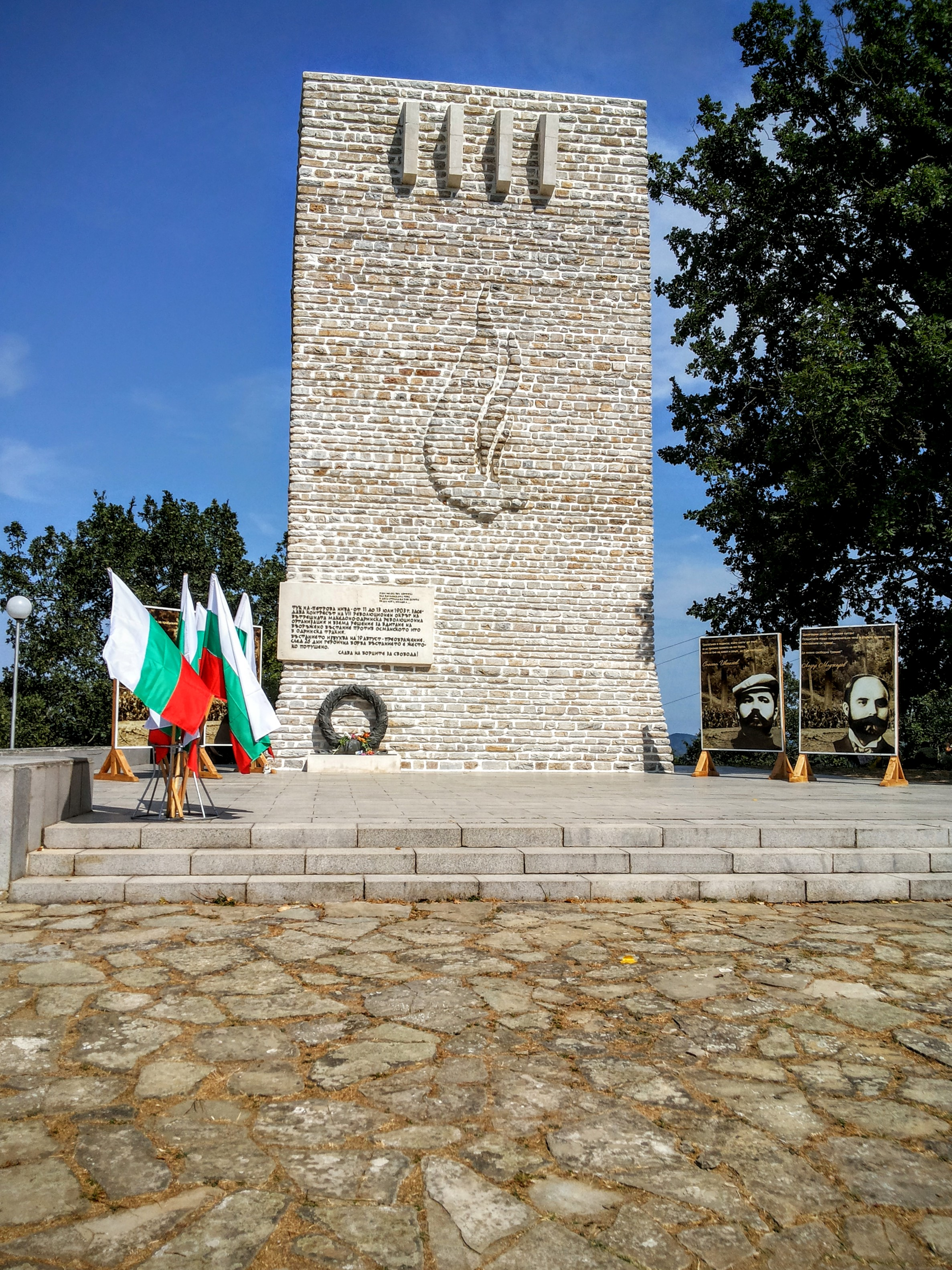
Petrova Niva monument, dedicated to the Preobrazhenie Uprising, near Malko Tarnovo, Bulgaria.

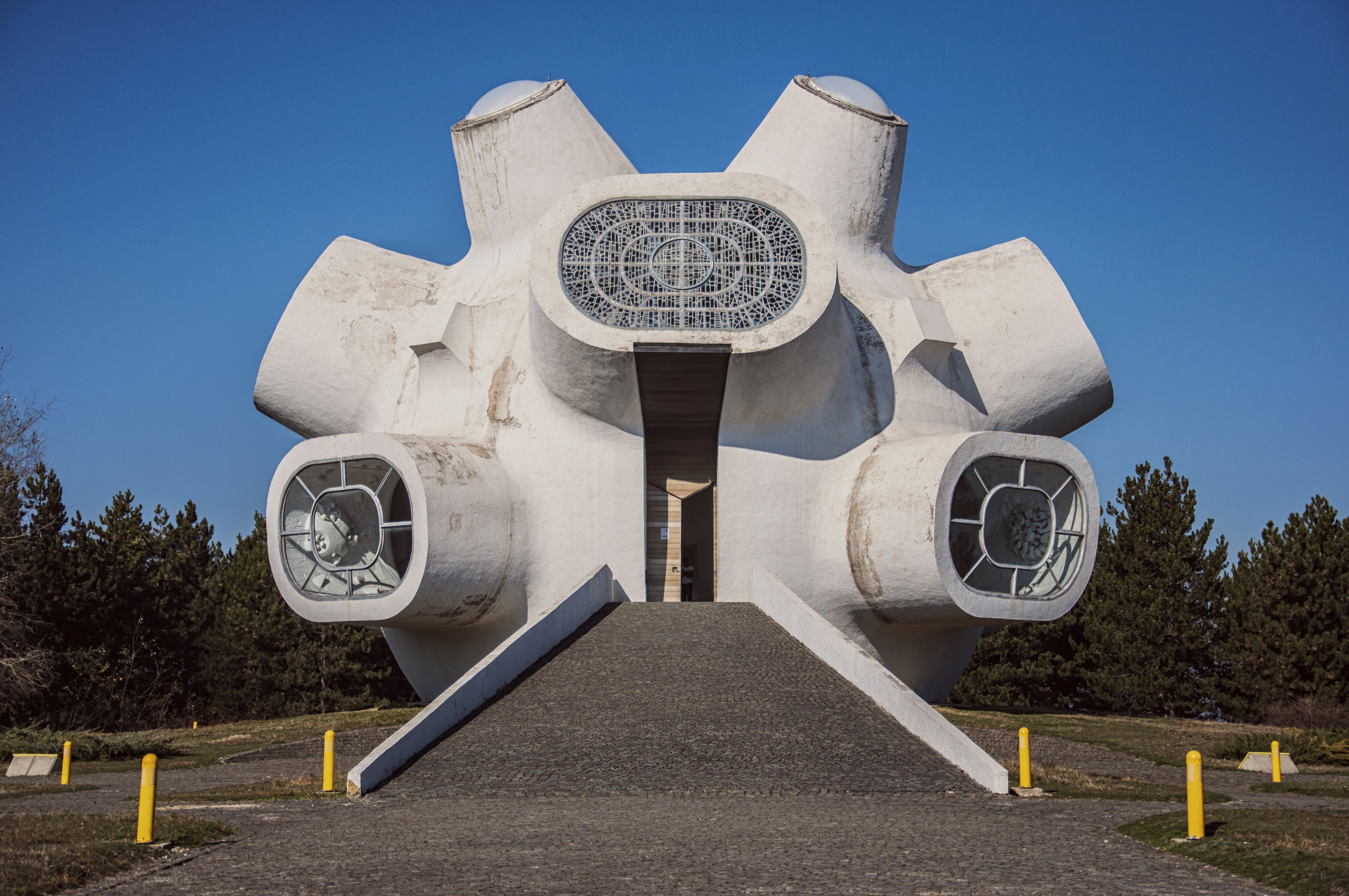
Makedonium monument, dedicated to the Ilinden Uprising, Kruševo, North Macedonia.

The uprising was commemorated by the Macedonian and Thracian diaspora in Bulgaria, and by all factions within the IMARO. It was commemorated officially in Macedonia under Bulgarian rule when it occupied then South Serbia during World War I. In the Kingdom of Yugoslavia during the interwar period, the local celebration of the event was passively ignored or actively repressed by Yugoslav officials. Celebrations occurred also in 1939 and 1940 in defiance of the ban by Serb authorities. The Bulgarian regime recognized the legacy of the event as its own during World War II and granted pensions to veterans, but excluded those who were perceived as engaging in "anti-Bulgarian or anti-state expression or activity." Celebrations of the event then were officially institutionalized. Before World War II, Serbian historiography claimed the uprising was Bulgarian and also attempted to downplay its significance for the locals in the Bitola region, who were subjected to Serbianization. After the creation of the Socialist Federal Republic of Yugoslavia, and the recognition of a Macedonian state and people within it, it changed its stance. According to historian Elisabeth Barker, there are accounts which claim that the uprising was imposed by the Bulgarian War Office (encouraged by Russia) on the reluctant leaders of IMARO, who thought that the time was not right for an uprising.

During World War II, Macedonian Partisans claimed to be the inheritors of the Ilinden Uprising and the Kruševo Republic. Ilinden veteran Panko Brashnarov spoke in the first session of Anti-fascist Assembly for the National Liberation of Macedonia (ASNOM) on August 2, 1944, emotionally declaring a "Second Ilinden" of the Macedonian people, which announced the establishment of the Socialist Republic of Macedonia. ASNOM president Metodija Andonov-Čento regarded the session as "the result of a rather long period of blood, battles and superhuman efforts of the Macedonian people, beginning with 1903". In the first session, the day of the Ilinden Uprising's anniversary was proclaimed as an official holiday, known as Day of the Republic. As a result, the uprising later became one of the most potent foundation myths of Macedonian nationalism. Some of the Macedonian communist leaders, such as Lazar Koliševski, initially questioned the Macedonian national character of the uprising and of the IMRO revolutionaries from that period. Per him, the meeting of the communists that took place on Ilinden 1944 had nothing to do with the Ilinden uprising of 1903. During the brief entente between Bulgaria and Yugoslavia from 1946 to 1948, Macedonian historians gained access to Sofia's archival materials and published accounts, on whose basis they claimed Ilinden as an early expression of Macedonian adherence to national liberation with ideals of brotherhood and unity. In 1948, the former IMRO revolutionaries Pavel Shatev and Panko Brashnarov wrote a statement to the Central Committee of the Communist Party of the Soviet Union on the situation in Yugoslav Macedonia, where they declared themselves against Communist Party of Yugoslavia's policy. They insisted that it was a mass practice to neglect everything Bulgarian, even though it was a historical fact the participants in the Ilinden Uprising saw themselves as Bulgarians. Afterwards they were persecuted. During the Greek Civil War, many of SNOF's leaders adopted noms de guerre, that had been used by participants in the Ilinden Uprising. SR Macedonia granted monthly pensions and commemorative medallions (Ilinden spomenica) to Ilinden veterans whose applications were successful. However, those who were prosecuted in a court for criminal acts against the people and the state were excluded. Extensive historical research was done to nationalize the Ilinden myth, which proved significant in the repelling of territorial and identity claims by the neighboring states. This process of nationalization caused tensions with Greece and Bulgaria.

Greek historiography has downplayed the uprising as the work of extremists. After the Tito–Stalin split, Bulgaria started firmly denying the existence of a Macedonian nation and language. Bulgarian historians began emphasizing the Bulgarian identity of the uprising's participants again. In response to Macedonian scholarship, the Bulgarian Academy of Sciences published works highlighting the Bulgarian aspects of the uprising. The uprising has been traditionally commemorated by Bulgarian Macedonians. A monument for the uprising was revealed in Petrova Niva in 1958.

The post-WWII Macedonian historiography has reappraised the Ilinden Uprising as an anti-Bulgarian revolt, with support for a distinct Macedonia. According to political scientist Alexis Heraclides, the Macedonian narrative considers the uprising as being of ethnic Macedonian or pan-Macedonian (multi-ethnic) character. Approximately 20% of the essays in the journal Macedonian Review between 1971 and 1989 mentioned the Ilinden Uprising. After the independence of the Republic of Macedonia (now North Macedonia) in 1991, the disputes with Bulgaria were further enhanced, with both sides claiming the uprising as their own. The uprising has been seen by the Macedonian historiography as exclusively Macedonian, although Ottoman and European sources usually called it "Bulgarian". Macedonian historians regard the qualification of the uprising as Bulgarian to be biased, with one historian asserting that it was a uprising of the Macedonian people regardless in which church they prayed, school they learned and which national name they carried. The leader of the IMARO and architect of the uprising Ivan Garvanov, is regarded there as a Greater Bulgarian agent who pushed the decision for a premature uprising. Bulgarian Army officers' participation is represented there as an alien element, while the fact the uprising's leaders were Bulgarian schoolmasters, is neglected. The leaders of the Ilinden Uprising are celebrated as national heroes in modern-day North Macedonia, and regarded as founders of the strive for Macedonian independence. The Kruševo Republic and the names of the IMARO revolutionaries like Gotse Delchev, Pitu Guli, Dame Gruev and Yane Sandanski are included into the lyrics of the Macedonian national anthem Denes nad Makedonija ("Today over Macedonia"). August 2 is a national holiday in North Macedonia, which considers it the date of the statehood in modern times. Since the day is also the symbolic date on which in 1944 the SR Macedonia was proclaimed at ASNOM's first session as a constituent republic of the Socialist Federal Republic of Yugoslavia, the ASNOM event is referred as the "Second Ilinden" in North Macedonia. Macedonian historians connected the uprising with the National Liberation Struggle during World War II, thus SR Macedonia was regarded as having fulfilled the goals of the uprising. September 8, 1991, the day when the Republic of Macedonia declared its independence from Yugoslavia, has been often referred to as the "third Ilinden" there. In the Macedonian narrative, there have been attempts to establish a continuity between Ilinden and other events such as the establishment of IMARO in 1893, Karposh's uprising and the battle of Chaeronea. This campaign was promoted by the Macedonian Academy of Sciences and Arts. Per political scientist Vemund Aarbakke, while the insurgents and the Principality of Bulgaria regarded the Ilinden Uprising and Preobrazhenie Uprising as part of the same revolutionary movement, Macedonian scholarship only refers to the Ilinden Uprising.

Starting from the communist period, Bulgarian academics began speaking about the Ilinden-Preobrazhenie Uprising, linking both uprisings. Regarding the term, Bulgarian historian Stefan Detchev stated: "The Ilinden-Preobrazhenie Uprising is a term imposed in Bulgarian historiography not even before World War II, but in the 1960s, in no small part precisely as a result of a strict nationalization of the historical narrative during the time of Todor Zhivkov." In Bulgaria, it is officially called by that term, considered as a joint struggle of the Bulgarians from Macedonia and Thrace. The dominant view in Bulgaria is that at that time the Macedonian and Thracian Bulgarians predominated in all regions of the uprisings and that Macedonian ethnicity did not exist yet. According to Heraclides, the Bulgarian historian Tchavdar Marinov explained to him that the Ilinden Uprising is the founding myth of the Macedonian identity in all its formulations, and the Bulgarian state has tried to appropriate the myth of the Ilinden Uprising and include it in the pan-Bulgarian narrative, since the uprising in Bulgaria does not have the same value as in North Macedonia and is much less popular compared to the April Uprising of 1876, which is the Bulgarian foundation myth. There are annual celebrations in Petrova Niva commemorating the uprising. Per historian Bernard Lory, in practice, the Ilinden Uprising was designed as a belated replica of the Bulgarian April Uprising of 1876, which finished disastrously, but which the national narrative had transformed into the culmination of the anti-Ottoman struggle. Attempts from Bulgarian officials for joint actions and celebration of the Ilinden uprising were rejected from the Macedonian side as unacceptable.

According to anthropologist Keith Brown, there is evidence in the historical record to confirm the narratives of the three historiographies (Macedonian, Bulgarian and Greek). On August 2, 2017, the Bulgarian Prime Minister Boyko Borisov and his Macedonian colleague Zoran Zaev placed wreaths at the grave of Gotse Delchev on the occasion of the 114th anniversary of the Ilinden Uprising, after the previous day, when both signed a treaty for friendship and cooperation between the neighboring states. The treaty also resulted in the creation of an intergovernmental historical commission to "objectively re-examine the common history" of Bulgaria and Macedonia and envisages both countries will celebrate together events from their shared history. In an interview on August 4, 2018, Zaev said that "the Ilinden uprising is Macedonian" and "if any citizen of Bulgaria wants to celebrate it, let them celebrate it." On October 9, 2019, the Bulgarian government issued its "Framework Position" on the enlargement of the European Union for North Macedonia and Albania, including a condition for the intergovernmental historical commission to reach an agreement about the uprising. In 2020, Bulgaria blocked the candidature of North Macedonia to the European Union over an 'ongoing nation-building process' based on historical negationism of the Bulgarian legacy in the broader region of Macedonia.

== Honors ==
=== In Bulgaria ===
- Ilindentsi village in Strumyani Municipality, in Blagoevgrad Province is named after the uprising
- Preobrazhentsi village in Ruen Municipality, in Burgas Province is named after the uprising
- Ilinden village in Hadzhidimovo Municipality, in Blagoevgrad Province is named after the uprising
- Ilinden, Sofia is a district of Sofia, located in the western parts of the city, named after the uprising
- OMO Ilinden-Pirin, ethnic Macedonian organization in Bulgaria
- Ilinden (organization) was a veteran nonpolitical organization set up by Bulgarian refugees from Macedonia.

=== In North Macedonia ===
- Ilinden Municipality, in the Skopje region
- Ilinden, the seat of Ilinden Municipality
- Ilinden is a peak on Baba Mountain in Pelister National Park
- FK Ilinden 1955 Bašino, football club near Veles
- FK Ilinden Skopje, football club in the village of Ilinden

=== Elsewhere ===
- Ilinden Peak on Greenwich Island in the South Shetland Islands, Antarctica, is named after the uprising
- Rockdale Ilinden FC football club in Sydney, Australia

== Gallery ==
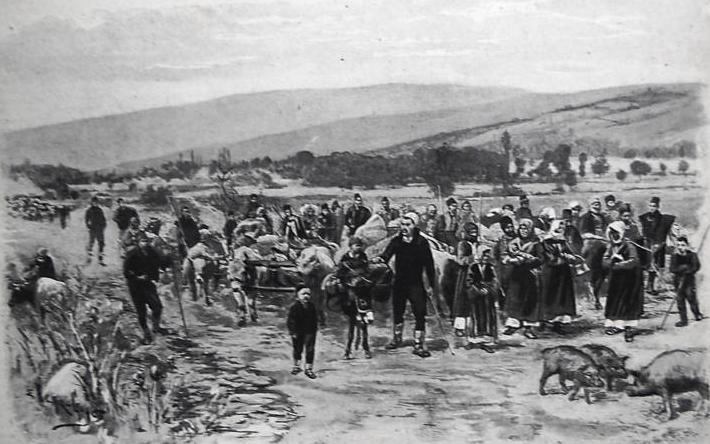
L'Illustration magazine depicting Macedonian Bulgarian refugees crossing the Ottoman - Bulgaria border after the Ilinden Uprising.

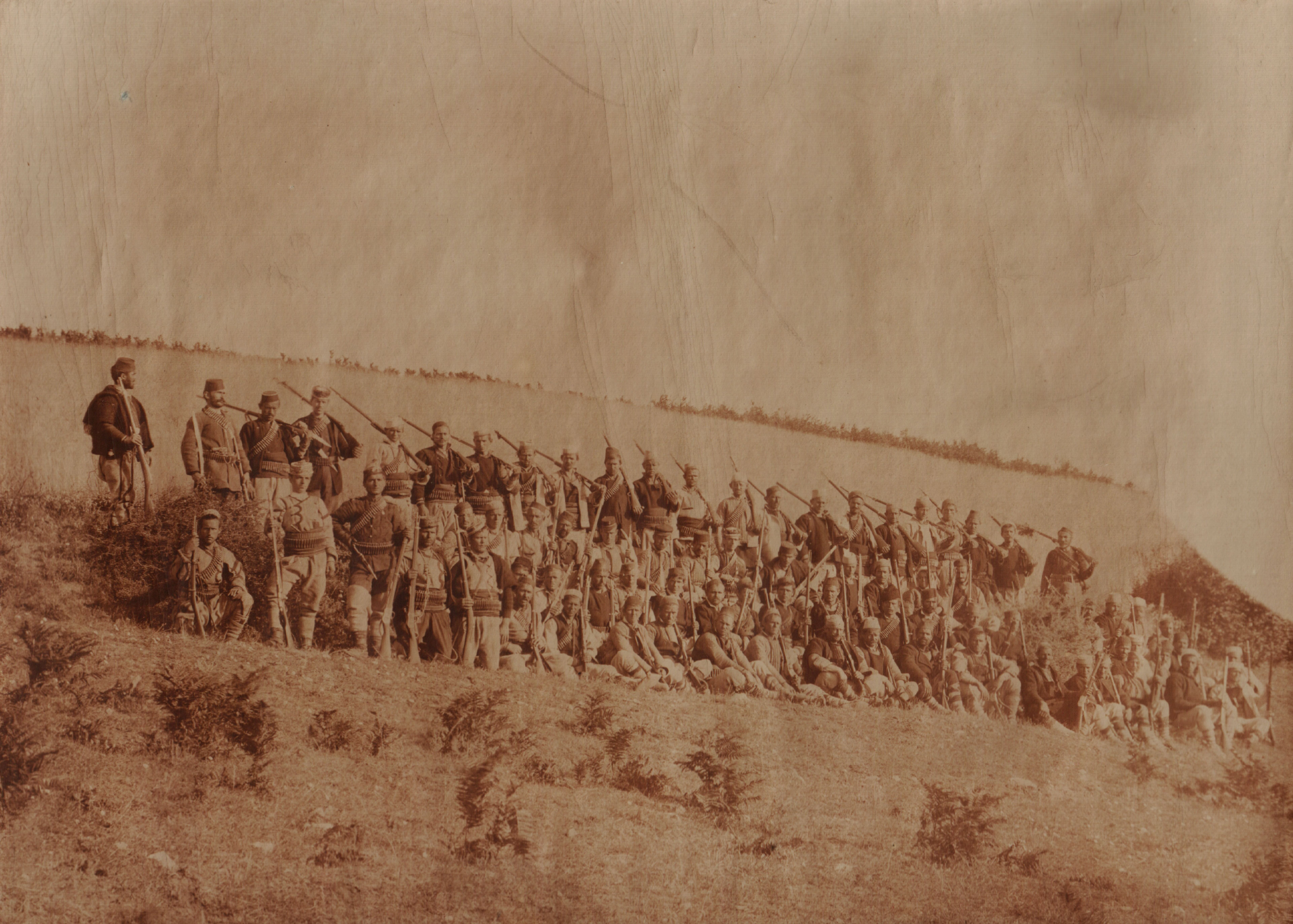
One of the Kruševo chetas during the uprising

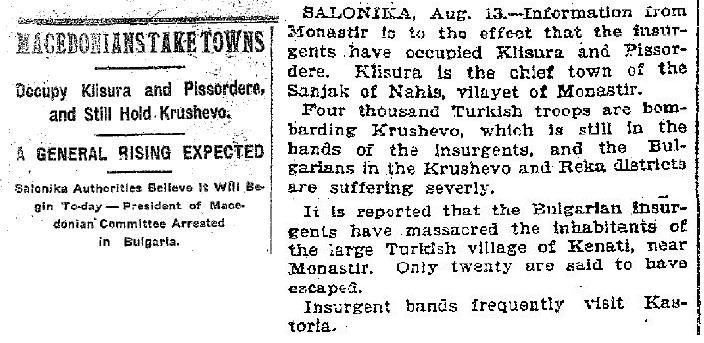
The events in the Ilinden Uprising as seen by the American New York Times; August 14, 1903.

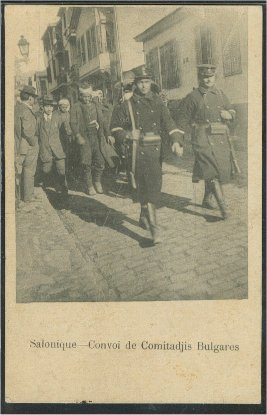
A convoy of captured Bulgarian IMRO activists

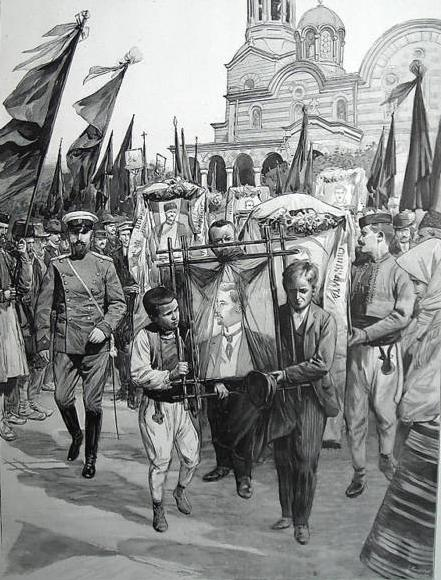
L'Illustration magazine depicting a refugee demonstration in Sofia, Bulgaria, after the crushing of the Uprising.

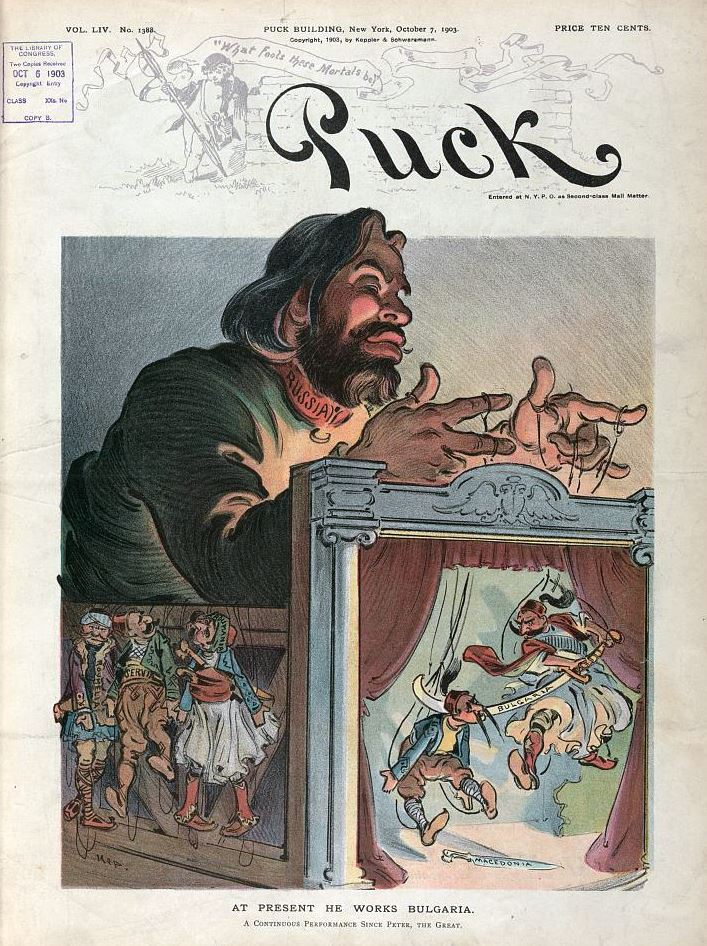
A Puck Magazine satirical illustration depicting Bulgaria and Macedonia as Russian puppets, sword fighting, with the Bulgarian one about to decapitate the Macedonian one, October 1903.

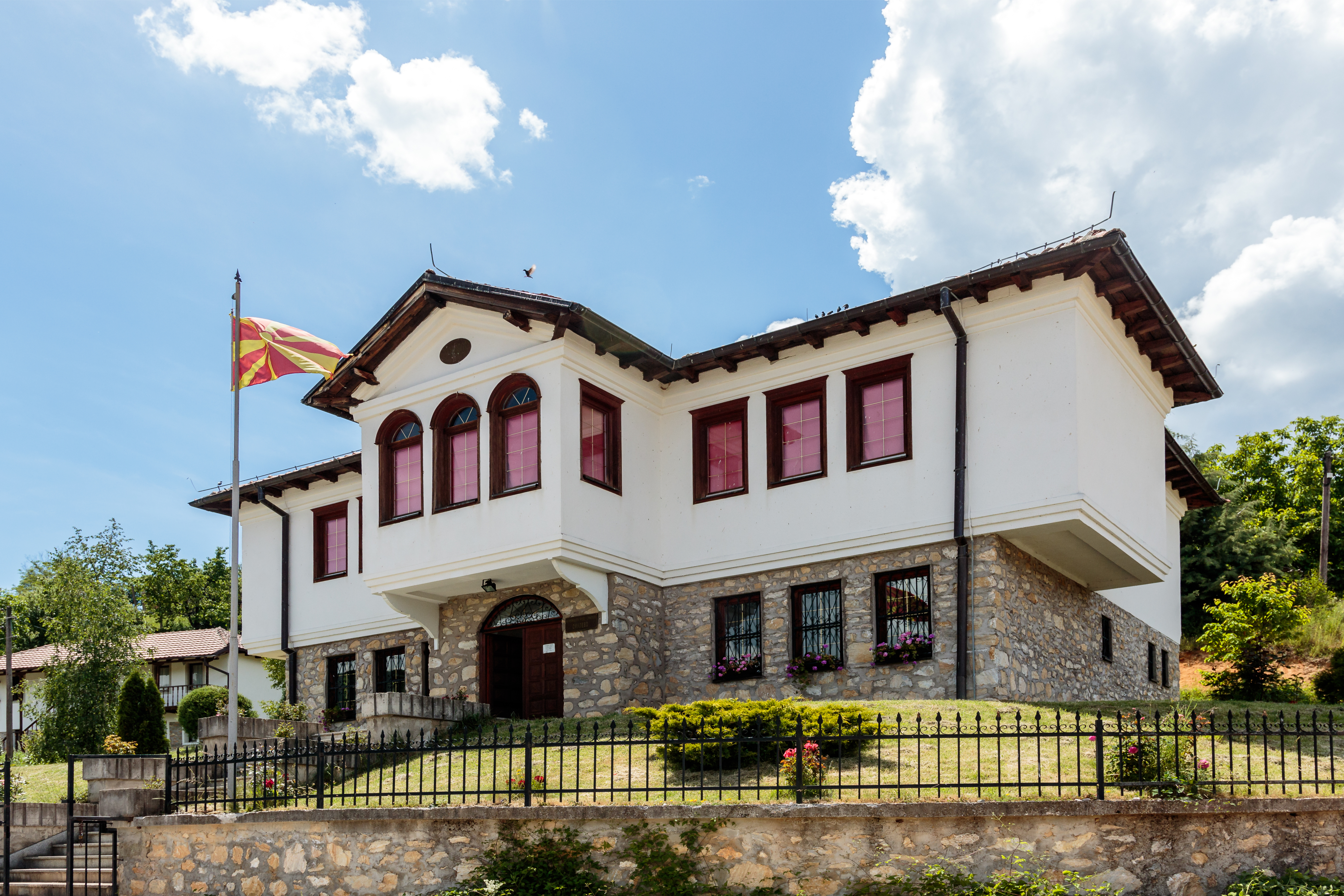
Museum in Smilevo dedicated to the Smilevo congress of May 1903, on which the decision for a uprising was confirmed and the date was chosen

== See also ==
- Razlovci uprising
- Ohrid-Debar Uprising
- Tikvesh Uprising
- Kresna-Razlog Uprising
