= Bulgarian Officers' Brotherhoods =

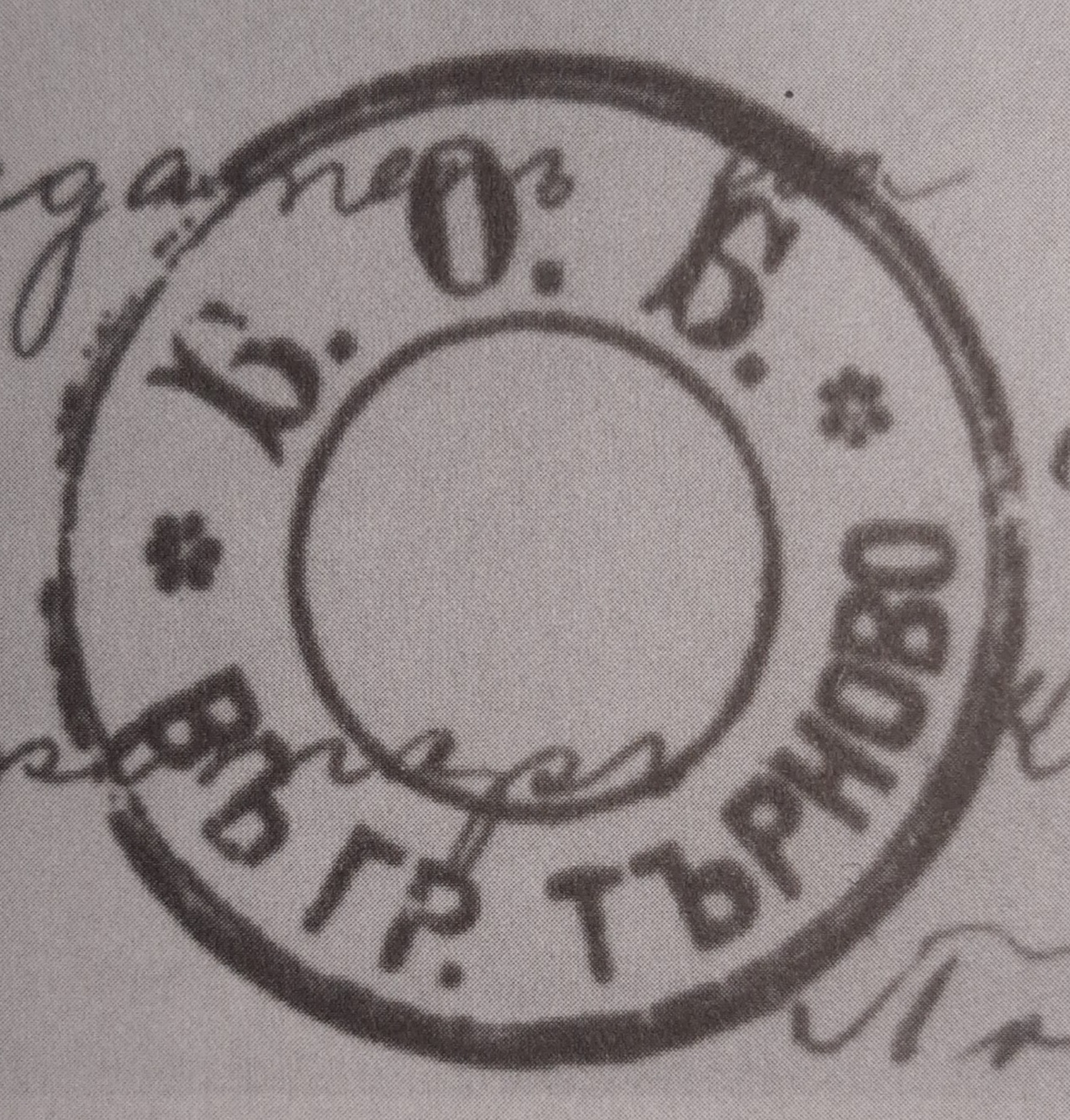
Stamp of the first Bulgarian liberation brotherhood in Tarnovo

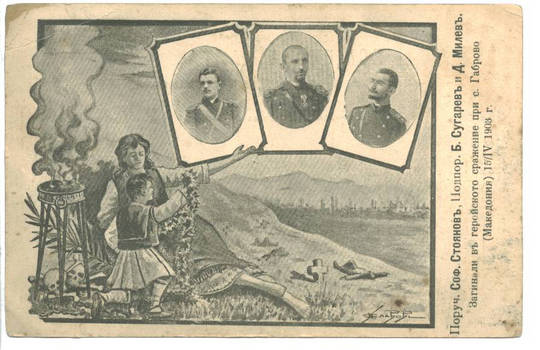
Commemorative postcard on the occasion of the death of the officers Stoyanov, Sugarev and Milev. They perished in a battle with Ottoman troops on April 28, 1903, near Gabrovo.

Bulgarian officers' brotherhoods, known also as Bulgarian liberation fraternities, was a clandestine military organization created at the end of the 19th century in Bulgarian army with the aim of drawing Bulgaria into a war with the Ottoman Empire. Their ultimate goal was the freedom of the territory of Macedonia and Adrianople Thrace. The brotherhoods played a significant role in the Macedonian-Adrianopolitan revolutionary movement until the beginning of the Balkan Wars.

The first clandestine society was established by Bulgarian army officers in Tarnovo in 1897. A second company appeared in Ruse, and then in Sliven, Razgrad, Vratsa, Dobrich, Varna and other places.The organization distributed a manifesto in which it invited all Bulgarian officers from Macedonia and Adrianople Thrace to join its ranks. The fraternities were led by the Sofia Society. By 1900, the members of the fraternities were ca. 1,000 people. These were about half of the then officer corps in the Bulgarian Army. In this period, they stood at the head of the Supreme Macedonian-Adrianople Committee (SMAC), with the companies themselves unofficially becoming part of these committees. Among the more famous figures of the brotherhoods were Boris Sarafov, Aleksandar Protogerov, Kliment Boyadzhiev, Stamat Ikonomov, Toma Davidov, Anastas Yankov and others. A large part of the activists of the brotherhoods participated also in the revolutionary activity of Internal Macedonian-Adrianople Revolutionary Organization (IMARO).

The main role in the creation in 1900 of the so-called rifle companies, associated with the Yunak Gymnastic Society, was played by the brotherhoods, which led to the formation of a set of a clandestine armed paramilitary groups as in Bulgaria, as well as on Ottoman territory. After the split of SMAC in 1901, the brotherhoods were confused and began to cease their activity. With a secret letter to the officers on actual service in Bulgarian army from December 1903, the new SMAC leadership restored the activity of the fraternities. As a result, many of its members organized themselves and participated in the Ilinden-Preobrazhenie uprising. After 1905, they accepted the official decision to closing down the activity of the SMAC with a great disappointment. Therefore, many of the officers then gave up with their revolutionary activity and returned to the army. Thus, the companies were depersonalized and gradually ceased their activities. Before the Balkan Wars, another attempt was made to restore this organization in June 1912 in Sofia. Thus, for a few months, the organization was activated, provoking the Bulgarian government to accept the idea about a war with the Ottoman Empire. The beginning of the Balkan Wars (1912-1913) finally put an end to the brotherhoods, whose members went back into the Bulgarian Army.

== See also ==
- Autonomy for Macedonia and Adrianople regions
- Bulgaria during World War I
