= Supreme Macedonian-Adrianople Committee =

Bulgarian revolutionary organization

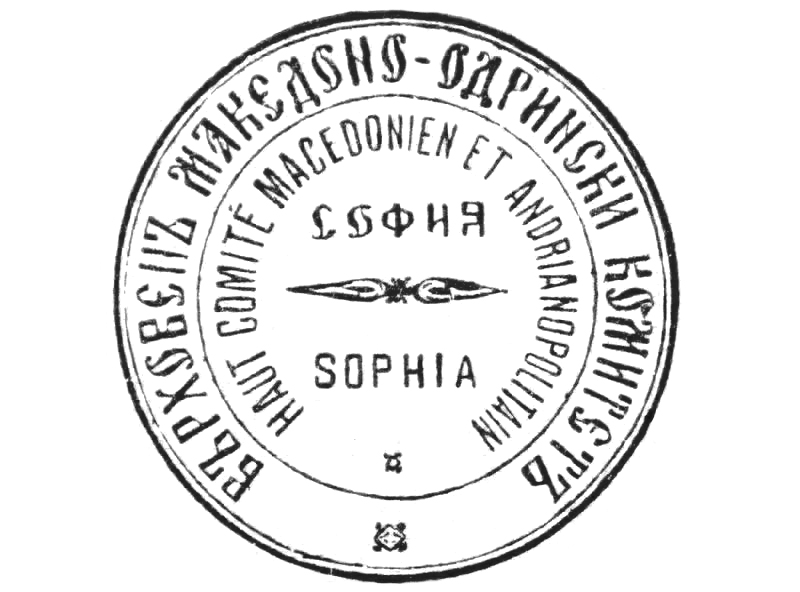
A seal of the organization

The Supreme Macedonian-Adrianople Committee (SMAC), (Bulgarian: Върховен македоно - одрински комитет, (ВМОК)), also known as the Supreme Macedonian Committee (SMC), was a Bulgarian paramilitary and political organization, active in Bulgaria as well as in Macedonia and Adrianople regions of the Ottoman Empire. It was based in Sofia from 1895 to 1905. This committee was the governing body of the Macedonian-Adrianopolitan refugees' societies in the country and of the corresponding fraternities. The main purpose of the Committee was the political autonomy of Macedonia and Adrianople regions, with their subsequent unification with Bulgaria. This was to be achieved through establishment of set of committees in Bulgaria, their arming and preparing for military intervention.

== History ==
=== Activity ===
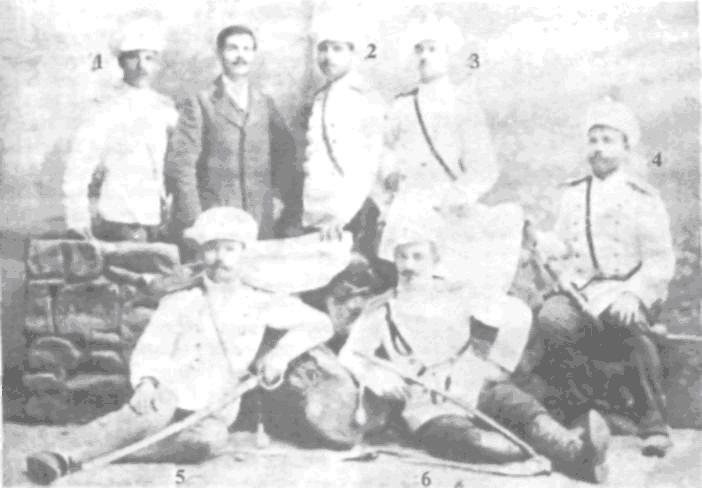
Bulgarian officers Venedikov, Nachev, Sarafov, Lukov, Mutafov and Garufalov, who participated in the chetas' action in 1895.

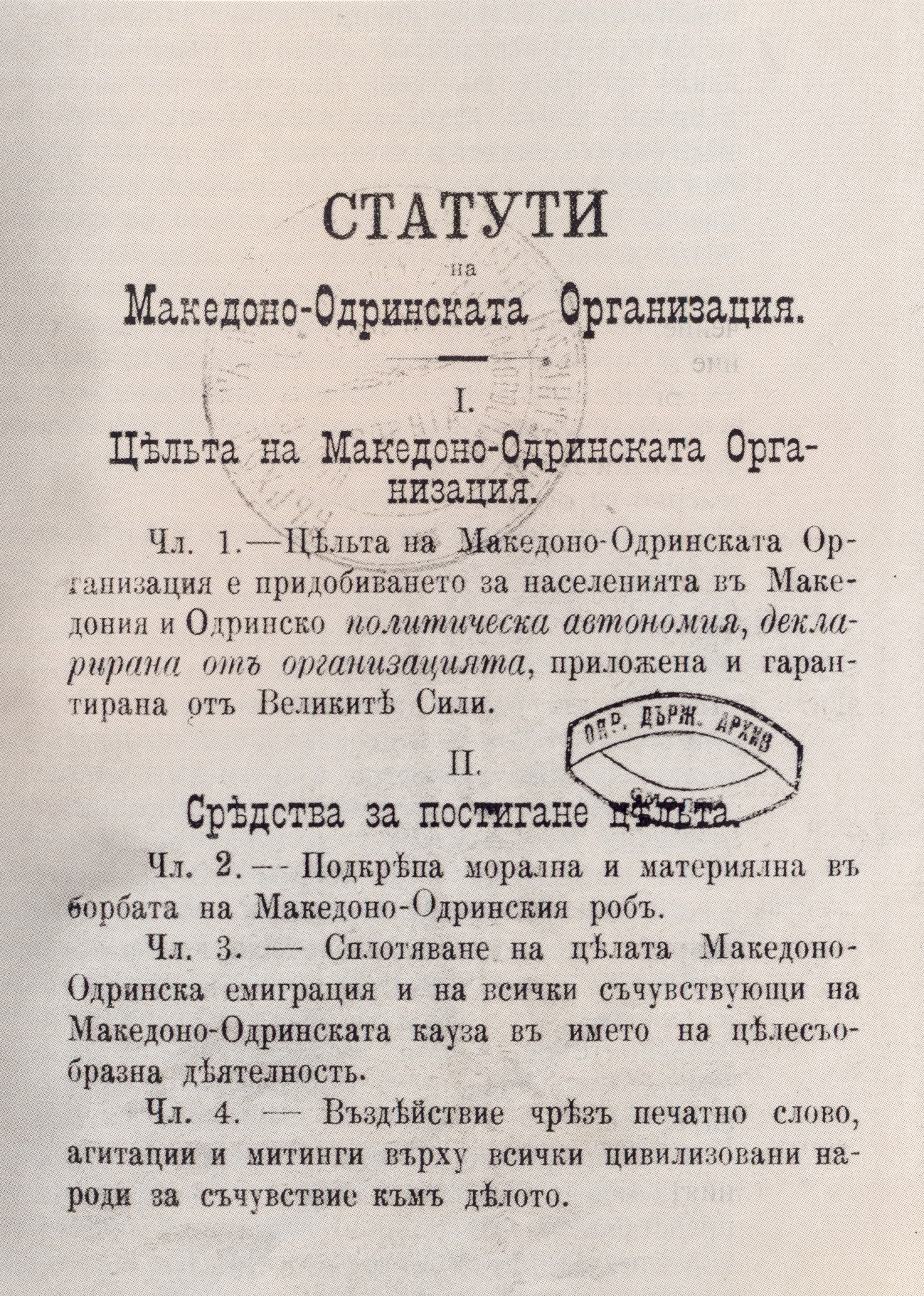
Statute of the Macedonian-Adrianople Organization, a general meeting of SMAC, 1900. Chapter I. - Goal Art. 1. The goal of MAO is to secure political autonomy for the Macedonia and Adrianople regions...

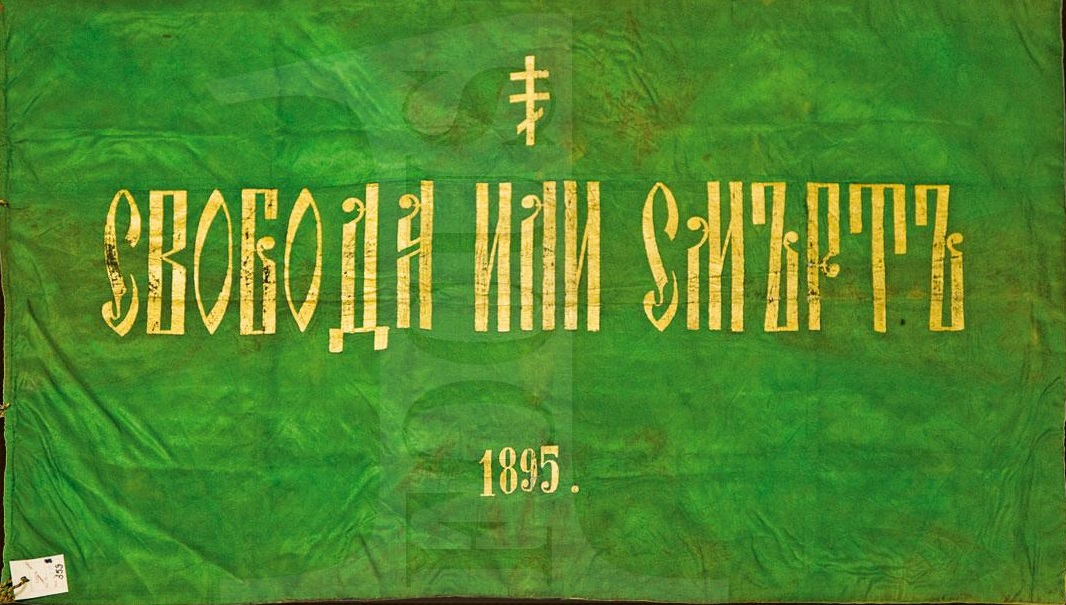
Supreme Committee's banner. The inscription reads: Svoboda ili smart.

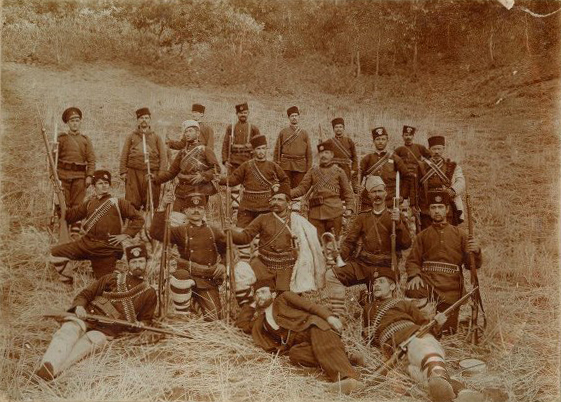
Supreme Committee's band during Gorna Dzhumaya Uprising.

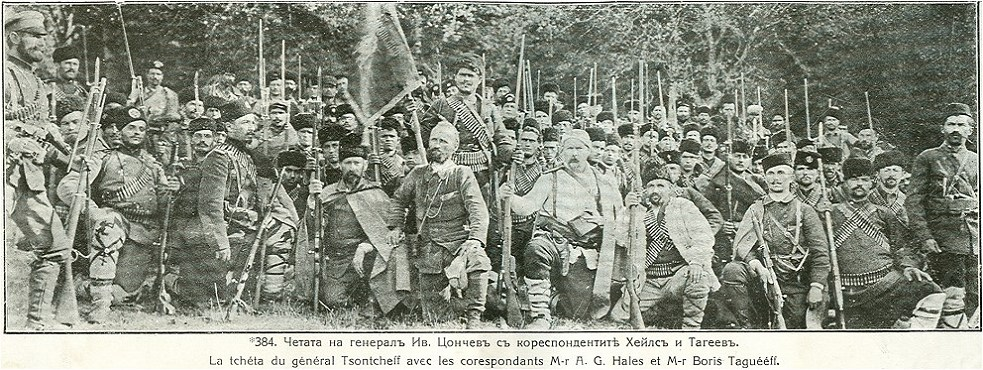
General Ivan Tsonchev's Supreme Committee's band during Ilinden Uprising.

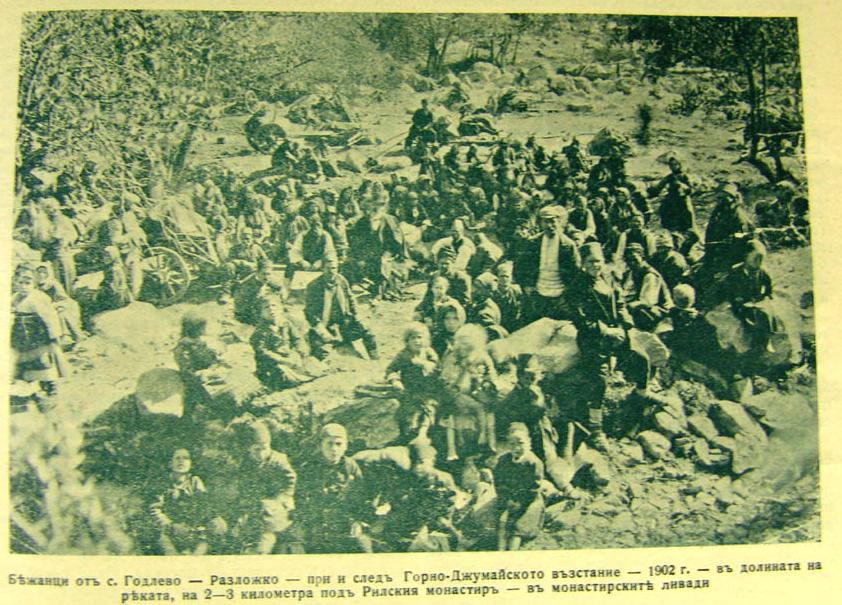
Macedonian Bulgarian refugees close to Rila Monastery after the Gorna Dzhumaya Uprising.

Macedonian Bulgarian emigrants in Bulgaria, led by Trayko Kitanchev, in March 1895, formed the Macedonian Organization, at the head of which was the Macedonian Committee. Kitanchev became SMAC's first president, while Naum Tyufekchiev was elected as the vice president. In its first congress on that year, it formulated its goals as "attainment for the populations of Macedonia and the Adrianople region of political autonomy, to be applied and guaranteed by the Great Powers." In the same year on December, it was renamed as Supreme Macedonian Committee. As a rule, its leaders were Bulgarian military officers, who maintained close relations with Bulgarian prince Ferdinand. It attempted to start an uprising in 1895 in the area of Melnik but it failed because the locals were not included. It plundered also the village Dospat and killed many of the local Pomaks. These acts resulted in reprisals against local Christians. The Macedonian autonomy for the Organization was a prelude for its unification with Bulgaria.

Simultaneously a revolutionary organization of Thracian Bulgarian immigrants was founded in 1896 in Varna led by Petko Kiryakov. Only two months later in December 1896 in Burgas was convened the Congress of the Thracian emigration in the country called Strandzha. To perform its task a secret revolutionary committee was founded with the task to support the organization and to send armed bands in Ottoman Thrace. Once, in the next few years it sent several detachments in Strandzha and the Rhodopes. In 1899 the Supreme Macedonian Committee made to "Strandzha" the proposal for unification. This act was realized on the seventh Congress of Supreme Macedonian Committee (30 July-5 August 1900). The combined organization was called Supreme Macedonian-Adrianople Committee. SMAC believed that liberation can be achieved with cooperation with Bulgaria and the Bulgarian army, and equated being Macedonian with being Bulgarian.

On 1 February 1900, in Bucharest, agents of SMAC killed Kiril Fitovski, who was sent by the Committee to buy weapons in Romania, but was subsequently suspected of spying on behalf of the Ottoman government. Romanian police captured the assassins, who made full confessions and revealed the involvement of the SMAC. Subsequently Ștefan Mihăileanu published a number of articles in which he branded SMAC as a criminal organization extorting wealthy people for money and revealed details of its preparations for armed struggle in Macedonia. SMAC's chairman Boris Sarafov reacted by ordering his assassination. On 22 July 1900, Mihăileanu was assassinated by Stoyan Dimitrov in Bucharest. His assassination created a serious diplomatic crisis between Romania and Bulgaria. As a result Sarafov was stripped of his chairmanship and was jailed for a month. After Sarafov's arrest, the Bulgarian government also succeeded in replacing him along with the entire leadership of the SMAC, helping General Ivan Tsonchev to take control of the Committee. A Romanian investigation also concluded that the Committee planned even an assassination of king Carol I of Romania, due to Romania's support for pan-Romanianism among the Aromanians.

In September 1902, SMAC launched an uprising known as the Gorna Dzhumaya Uprising in Pirin Macedonia. The uprising was promptly suppressed by Ottoman forces. After the failure of the uprising, the Bulgarian government dissolved the committee in February 1903. During the Ilinden Uprising, SMAC fought together with their former rivals the Internal Macedonian Revolutionary Organization (IMRO). It was officially disbanded in 1905, by its leaders at the insistence of IMRO. Nevertheless, the military wing of the Organization continued to engage in illegal revolutionary activity until 1912. Some of its members such as Sarafov and General Protogerov joined IMRO, and became the leaders of the pro-Bulgarian nationalist right-wing faction through which the Bulgarian government assumed control over IMRO.

=== Relationships with IMRO ===
With its creation, the revolutionary movement in Macedonia was split into two wings - external ("Supremists" or "Varhovists") and internal ("Centralists" or "Autonomists") - IMRO. The term "varhovist" (Supremist) was initially applied for SMAC's members but it was later applied for IMRO's pro-Bulgarian faction. The rival IMRO sought for an autonomous Macedonia as part of a Balkan Federation and preserving the territorial integrity and equality of the Macedonian population. The SMAC insisted on a major uprising, unlike the IMRO, which opposed an uprising because it thought the locals were still not ready. In the 1890s, IMRO's foreign representatives Gotse Delchev and Gyorche Petrov established contact with SMAC. While they were able to befriend some officers, they did not manage to develop good relations with SMAC's leaders. SMAC wanted IMRO to be subordinate to it. In the late 1890s, IMRO supported Boris Sarafov into becoming the leader of the Organization. As a result, IMRO took control of SMAC. SMAC supported IMRO with funds and arms. The cooperation between the two organizations lasted until 1901, when general Ivan Tsonchev organized a faction against Delchev and Petrov. Another faction led by Hristo Stanishev continued cooperating with IMRO, while many commanders continuously switched between the two organizations. In 1903, IMRO uneasily established cooperation again with the leaderships of the SMAC, which was the joint participation of their detachments in the Ilinden-Preobrazhenie Uprising in the Serres revolutionary district. The leader of the district Yane Sandanski had little choice but to agree because he was obtaining weapons from Bulgarian sources. Previously, SMAC's bands had confrontations with IMRO's bands led by Yane Sandanski, Hristo Chernopeev, Krastyo Asenov, and others in the same Serres revolutionary district. Interpreting such incidents as competition between two distinct national movements, ethnic Bulgarian and ethnic Macedonian, as it is viewed by Macedonian historians, is incorrect. In fact, some SMAC leaders came from the region of Macedonia, while a number of their IMRO-rival vojvodas, were natives of Bulgaria. Many commanders moved back and forth between both organizations as Toma Davidov, Boris Sarafov and Yane Sandanski. After 1903, Sandanski and Chernopeev became the leaders of the left-wing faction of IMRO, which was firmly hostile towards the right-wing and their conflict was characterized with mafia style assassinations. Thus, Sarafov was killed in this way in 1907 on the order of Sandanski.

=== Legacy ===
The Macedonian historiography has stigmatized the Supreme Committee as an instrument of Bulgaria's "Greater Bulgarian" policy. However, as the relations between the Bulgarian governments and the Supreme Committee, as well as these between the SMAC and the IMRO seemed more complex than such interpretation. Historians, such as Mark Biondich and Raymond Detrez, have also seen SMAC as an instrument of Bulgaria's policy. Actually, the two centers of Macedonian revolutionary movement initially cooperated well, especially during the time when the Bulgarian army officer Boris Sarafov was SMAC's leader. Contrary to the claims about very distinct agendas of both organizations, and that SMAC promoted "Greater-Bulgarianism", the Supreme Committee also declared as its aim the political autonomy of Macedonia. Some of SMAC leaders and members retained also pronounced local patriotism, espousing even ideas close to Macedonian nationalism. Such were the cases of the Bulgarian army colonel Anastas Yankov, Atanas Razdolov and Boris Sarafov declaring occasionally the Macedonians as a distinct nation. Also, members like Yane Sandanski and Vladislav Kovachev later became leaders of the left wing of IMRO and of the Macedonian Federative Organization, which were very anti-Greater Bulgaria oriented.

According to Bulgarian historiography, the concept of "supremism", imprinted during the 20th century mainly as a controversial term, has received its rehabilitation, as the Committee's significant contribution to the liberation struggles of the Macedonian and Thracian Bulgarians is currently recognized.

== Sources ==
- Върховният Македоно - Одрински комитет / 1895 - 1903 / Автор: Светлозар Елдъров, издател: Иврай ООД, Година на издаване: 2003 ISBN 954-91210-6-2
- Билярски, Цочо. Княжество България и македонският въпрос, т.1. Върховен македоно-одрински комитет 1895 - 1905 (Протоколи от конгресите), Българска историческа библиотека, 5, Иврай, София, 2002.
- Билярски, Цочо. Отношенията на Вътрешната македоно-одринска революционна организация и Върховния македоно-одрински комитет до 1902 г., ИДА, кн 59, 1990, стр. 233-291.
- Билярски, Цочо. Протоколите на Върховния македоно-одрински комитет между VII и VIII конгрес (1900-1901), ИДА, 1986.
- Билярски, Цочо. Статути на Върховния македоно-одрински комитет, в: „Военноисторически сборник“, 1984, №2.
- Билярски, Цочо, И. Бурилкова, Писма от дейци на Върховния македонски комитет и на Българските македоно-одрински революционни комитети в архива на д-р Константин Стоилов (1895-1898 г.), Македонски преглед, кн. 4, 1996, стр. 101-128.
- Георгиев, Георги. Македоно-одринското движение в Кюстендилски окръг (1895-1903), Македонски научен институт, София, 2008.
- Елдъров, Светлозар. Върховният македоно-одрински комитет и Македоно-одринската организация в България (1895 - 1903), Иврай, София, 2003.
- Елдъров, Светлозар. Кореспонденцията между генерал Иван Цончев и капитан Александър Протогеров за македоно-одринското революционно движение (октомври 1901 - юли 1903 г.), ИВИНД, 1991, кн. 52, стр. 118-143.
- Елдъров, Светлозар, Т. Петров. Офицерите от Българската армия на Княжество България в Илинденско-Преображенското въстание 1903 година, ВИС, 1988, кн. 4, стр. 137-146.
- Николов, Б. Протоколи от районните конгреси на Върховния македоно-одрински комитет през 1905 г., ВИС, 1984, кн. 3, стр. 164-179.
- Пандев, К. Вътрешната организация и Върховният комитет 1899-1901, Етюд историк, 1973.
- Sfetas, Spyridon (2001). "Το ιστορικό πλαίσιο των ελληνο-ρουμανικών πολιτικών σχέσεων (1866-1913)" [The Historical Context of Greco-Romanian political relations (1866–1913)]. Makedonika (in Greek). 33 (1). Society for Macedonian Studies: 23–48. doi:10.12681/makedonika.278. ISSN 0076-289X.

== See also ==
- Bulgarian Officers' Brotherhoods
