= Antinogen Hadzhov =

Antigon Hadzov
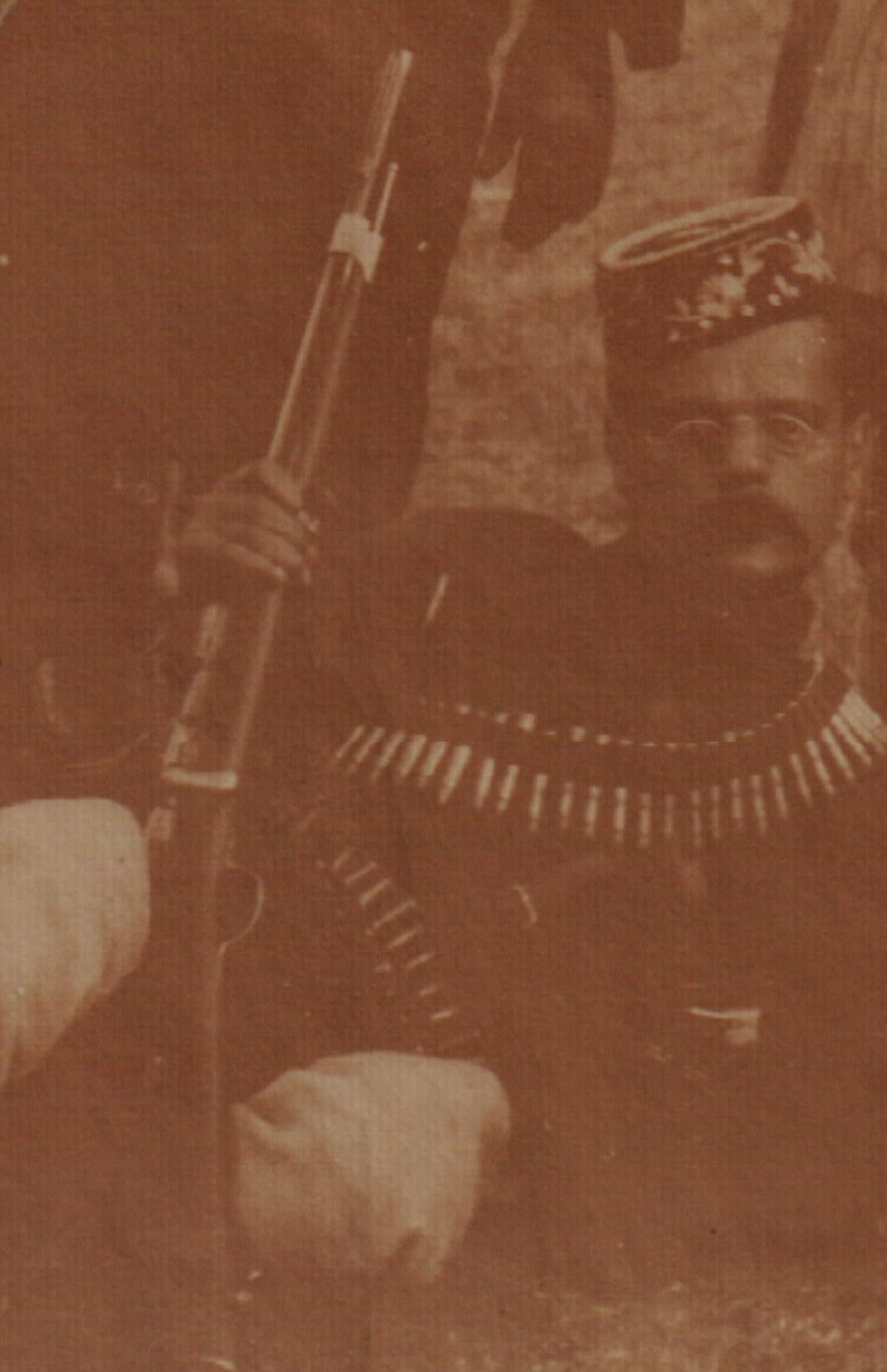
- Born: Struga, Ottoman Empire (today North Macedonia)
- Died: Struga, Ottoman Empire (today North Macedonia)
- Military career
- Allegiance: IMRO; Krushevo Republic
- Branch: Forest Staff of the Krushevo Revolutionary Region

Antinogen (Atinogen, Geni, Antigon) Dimitrov Hadzhov (1874 – July 21, 1912) was a Bulgarian teacher and revolutionary from the region of Macedonia. Hadzhov was a participant in the Macedonian Struggle, member of the Internal Macedonian Adrianople Revolutionary Organization, participant in the Ilinden Uprising and one of the members of the Forest Headquarters of the Krusevo Rebel District.

== Biography ==
Hadzhov was born in 1874 in the town of Struga, as an only child in a family of a teachers in the Bulgarian Exarchate school system. In 1892, he graduated from the Pedagogical Department for Teacher Training of the Bulgarian Men's High School of Thessaloniki and became a teacher in Struga. He joined the Internal Macedonian Adrianople Revolutionary Organization as a student, invited by Aleksandar Chakarov. In 1895, he was among the founders of the organization's first structure in Struga, at which time only Bulgarians were allowed to be members. In the beginning of 1903, he became the headmaster of the Bulgarian junior high school in Krushevo and took part in the preparations for the Ilinden–Preobrazhenie Uprising. During the Uprising, he was a member of the Forest Staff of the Krushevo Rebel District and participated in the defense of the Krushevo Republic. After the defeat of the uprising by the Ottomans, he became a Bulgarian teacher in Ohrid, where he was a member of the neighborhood revolutionary committee. According to Milan Matov in this period the greatest real benefit for the structure of the IMARO was from Hadzhov, because all the intelligentsia had emigrated to Bulgaria and only he remained together with Hristo Uzunov in the area. With that, he decisively helped to restore the revolutionary groups along the entire coast of the Lake Ohrid.

He died on July 21, 1912, in Struga.
