= Toma Davidov =

Bulgarian revolutionary (1868–1903)

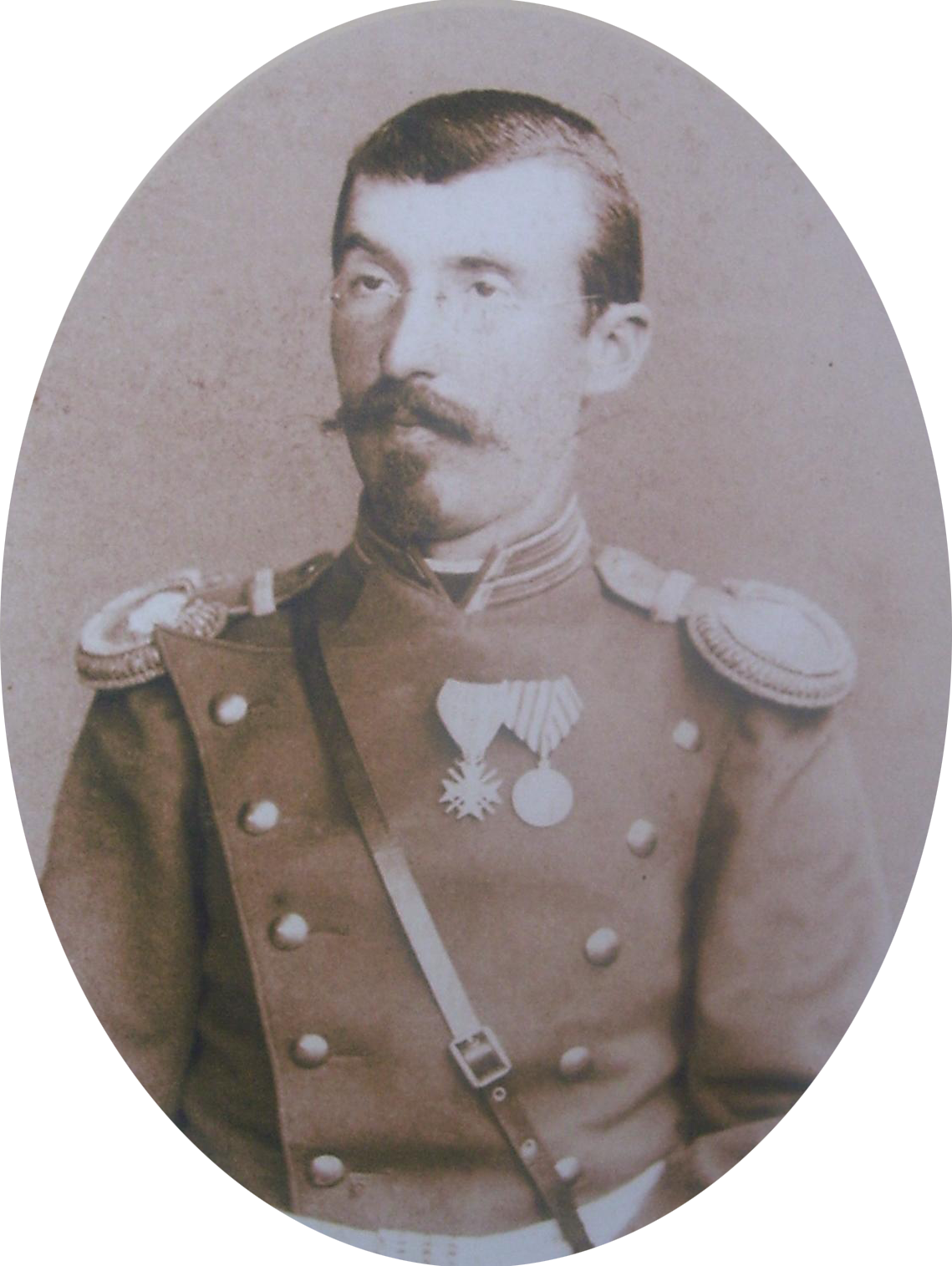
Toma Davidov in his officer's uniform.

Toma Kostov Davidov (2 May 1863 - 15 March 1903) was a Bulgarian Army officer and participant in the Macedonian Revolutionary Movement, a vojvode of the Macedonian Supreme Committee, later becoming a commander in the Internal Macedonian Revolutionary Organization.

== Biography ==
He was born in Lovech, then in the Ottoman Empire on 2 May 1863. He participated as a volunteer in the Serbo-Bulgarian War. Davidov graduated a military school in Sofia together with Gotse Delchev and Boris Sarafov. In the summer of 1895 Davidov participated in the Supreme Macedonian Committee chetas' action, which was organized by the Macedonian Supreme Committee. After this action, Davidov joined the Bulgarian Officers' Brotherhoods. At the VІ Macedonian Congress in 1899 he was elected a member of the leadership of the Supreme Macedonian Committee along with Boris Sarafov, Anton Bozukov, Slavcho Kovachev and Hristo Sarakinov. At the VІІ Macedonian Congress in Sofia in 1900 he was re-elected vice-president of the committee. Then, disappointed by the ideological contradictions between the Macedonian Bulgarian activists, in 1902 he left for Ottoman Macedonia as a vojvode of the Internal Macedonian Revolutionary Organization. His cheta (fighter group) was active in the areas of Bitola, Ohrid and Demir Hisar. Once he told Gotse Delchev:

I am not from Macedonia, but for its freedom I am ready to give my life in any moment.

He was killed by Turkish ambush near village Odzoleni, near Ohrid, on 15 March 1903. On March 15, 2020, a commemorative plaque was erected on its frontal lobe in North Macedonia from local Macedonian Bulgarian activists. A few days later, it was destroyed by Macedonists.
