= Anastas Yankov =

Bulgarian army officer and revolutionary

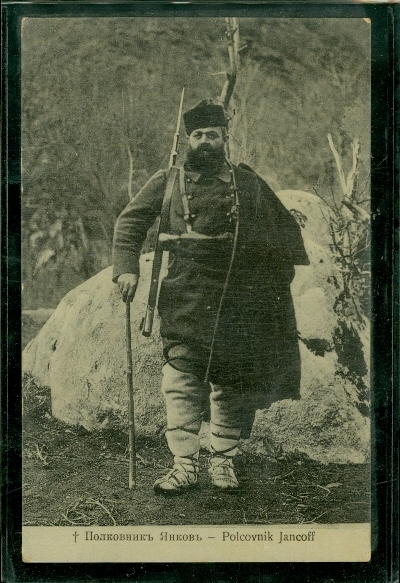
Colonel Yankov.

Anastas Yankov Dinkov was a Bulgarian army officer and revolutionary, a prominent voivode of the Supreme Macedonian-Adrianople Committee.

== Life ==
Anastas Yankov was born in 1857 in the Kastorian village of Zagorichani, then in the Ottoman Empire, today Vasiliada, Greece. Yankov studied in his native village, and later at the Bulgarian school in Constantinople, which he graduated with honors in 1875. He participated then as a volunteer in the Serbo-Turkish War (1876), in which he was awarded the Serbian Order and promoted to the rank of junior non-commissioned officer. During the Russo-Turkish War (1877-1878) he volunteered for the Bulgarian Opalchenie. He was then promoted again to the rank of non-commissioned officer. He was wounded and received the Russian St. George's Cross for his bravery. After the war he settled in the newly established Principality of Bulgaria, and in 1880 he graduated from the Military School in Sofia. He took part as an officer in the Serbo-Bulgarian War (1885). Yankov was awarded the Order of Courage for his bravery. In 1896 he left his military service and joined the ranks of the Supreme Macedonian-Adrianople Committee. He was touring Macedonia then to gather information on the readiness to revolt there. Yankov rejoined the army and served in the Ministry of War. On February 14, 1901, he was promoted to the rank of colonel.

In 1902, on the eve of the Gorna Dzhumaya Uprising, he went on regular leave, and after its expiration he applied for reserve and was discharged from the army. At the beginning of the Uprising, Yankov wrote to Prince Ferdinand that his recent journey through the country had become a triumph for the Bulgarian population. According to him, the people were very excited when saw him in an officer's uniform and the Supreme Macedonian Committee expected help from Bulgaria for the uprising. In June 1902 his detachment went to the Lerin region and his native Kastoria region. In a manifesto issued during the uprising he referred to Alexander the Great, Tsar Samuil, and other historical figures as Macedonians. In order to detach his native Zagorichani from IMRO influence, Yankov promulgated that it was high time that "Macedonians, like all other nations, Greeks, Serbs, Bulgarians and Cretans demand their rights and freedom arm-at-hand". Two years later, Pavlos Melas attested the effectiveness among the local Slavic speakers of Yankov's advocacy of the idea of the existence of a distinct Macedonian nation. Anastas Yankov's campaign created great problems for the rival revolutionary organization IMARO, which found it difficult to fend off his attempts to revolt.

In 1903 he took part in the Ilinden Uprising and led a detachment of 400 people, which operated in Pirin mountains, entered the headquarters of the uprising in Razlog and commanded the attack on Belitsa. After the uprising he returned to Bulgaria. On March 1, 1905, the Greek consul in Sofia reported in Athens that Yankov was crossing the border into Macedonia. Colonel Yankov died in a battle with Turkish troops on the way back to Bulgaria near the village of Vlahi in April 1906.

Colonel Yankov was married to Maria Popgeorgieva, sister of the Bulgarian revolutionary Rayna Knyaginya. Their son Kosta Yankov, was a major in the Bulgarian army, but became radicalized after the First World War. Kosta headed the military organization of the Bulgarian Communist Party and in 1925 organized the St Nedelya Church assault.
