= Ivan Tsonchev =

Bulgarian Army General and revolutionary

General Ivan Tsonchev
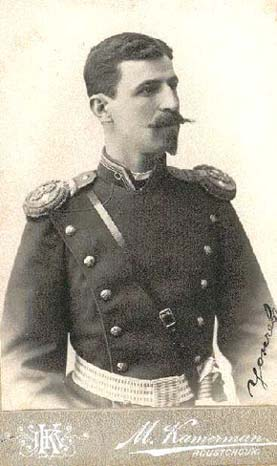
- Ivan Tsonchev in uniform.
- Born: 19 August 1859; Dryanovo, Ottoman Empire (now Bulgaria)
- Died: 16 December 1910 (aged 51); Sofia, Kingdom of Bulgaria
- Military career
- Allegiance: Russian Empire; Kingdom of Bulgaria
- Branch: Imperial Russian Army: Bulgarian Volunteer Corps; Bulgarian Army; IMRO
- Rank: General
- Conflicts: Russo-Turkish War (1877-1878); Bulgarian-Serbian War (1885); Gorna Dzhumaya Uprising; Ilinden-Preobrazhenie Uprising

Ivan Stefanov Tsonchev was a Bulgarian Army General and revolutionary (komitadji).

== Biography ==
Ivan Tsonchev was born on 19 August 1859 in Dryanovo, then in the Ottoman Empire. He became a volunteer and a participant in the Russo-Turkish War from 1877-1878. After the establishment of the Bulgarian Principality he became an officer and participated in the Serbian-Bulgarian War of 1885. Later he was the leader of the Supreme Macedonian-Adrianople Revolutionary Committee in the period 1901-1903. Tsonchev was the main organizer of the Gorna Dzhumaya Uprising in 1902 and a participant in the Ilinden-Preobrazhenie Uprising in 1903.

General Ivan Tsonchev died on 16 December 1910.
