= Krnka =

A Krnka may be referred to any variant of a pistol designed by Karel Krnka, a late 19th century designer from Bohemia, or the rifle designed by his father Sylvester Krnka for the Russian military.

== Rifle ==
- M1867 Russian Krnka - These were converted from the model 1857 muzzle loading rifles with a bronze receiver and steel lifting block much like the Snider. They were standard issue for Russia (during the Russo-Turkish War), Bulgaria, Serbia, & various balkan nations

== Variants ==
- Model 1895
- Model 1899
- Model 1904 - tested by the Austro-Hungarian Army. Not adopted, but influenced the eventual selection of the Roth–Steyr M1907 semi-automatic pistol.
