= Stamat Ikonomov =

Bulgarian revolutionary (1866–1912)

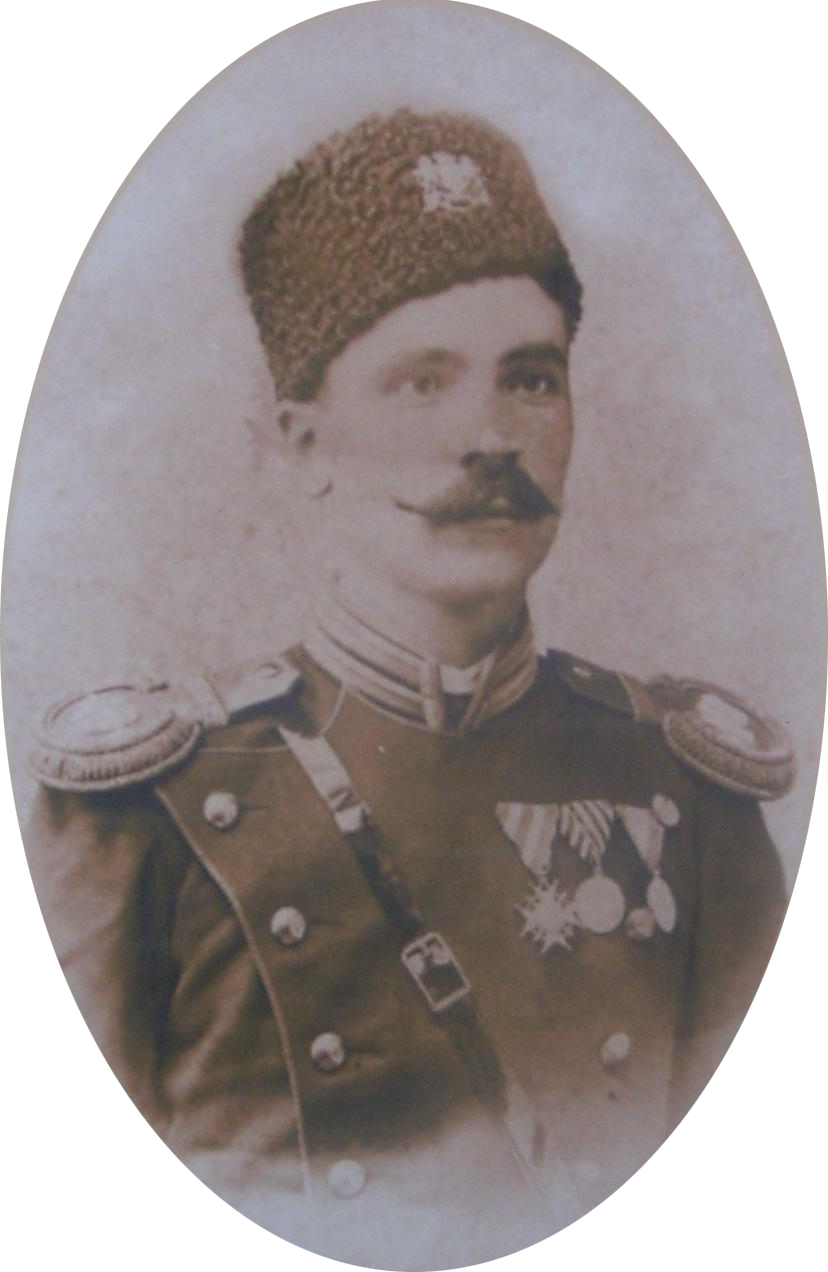
- Born: 18 June 1866; Malko Tarnovo, Ottoman Empire (modern Bulgaria)
- Died: 12 September 1912 (aged 46); Sofia, Bulgaria
- Other names: Stamo

Stamat Ikonomov (Bulgarian: Стамат Икономов) was a Bulgarian revolutionary, member of the Internal Macedonian Revolutionary Organization (IMRO) and military officer.

== Biography ==
Ikonomov was born in Malko Tarnovo, then in Ottoman Empire, where he first studied. He then graduated from high school in Varna, Bulgaria. In 1883 he joined the Military School in Sofia. During the Serbo-Bulgarian War (1885), Ikonomov was a volunteer. He graduated from the Military school in 1887 and served for 15 years as an officer in the Bulgarian Army and reached the rank of captain. In 1901 he was fired from office.

On the eve of the Ilinden-Preobrazhenie Uprising, Ikonomov was involved in the activities of the IMRO. He was a delegate is at the Petrova Niva Congress. Ikonomov teach military the rural militias. Despite his officers' rank, Ikonomov did not claim any post. During the revolt, he was head of a detachment of 100 insurgents operating in Bunarhisar.

After the uprising, in 1906 he entered again with a detachment in Ottoman Thrace, but due to illness he returned to Bulgaria. He was elected a delegate of the Kyustendil Congress of IMRO from 1908, but failed to attend. After the Young Turk Revolution, on December 31, 1908, a congress of the Edirne Revolutionary District was held in Edirne, where Stamat Ikonomov was presented as a delegate and included in the regional leadership. Ikonomov died in poverty in 1912 in Sofia.

In the birth house of Ikonomov in Malko Tarnovo is today an Ethnographic Museum.
