= Macedonian (obsolete terminology) =

Obsolete regional and ethnographic terminology with several meanings

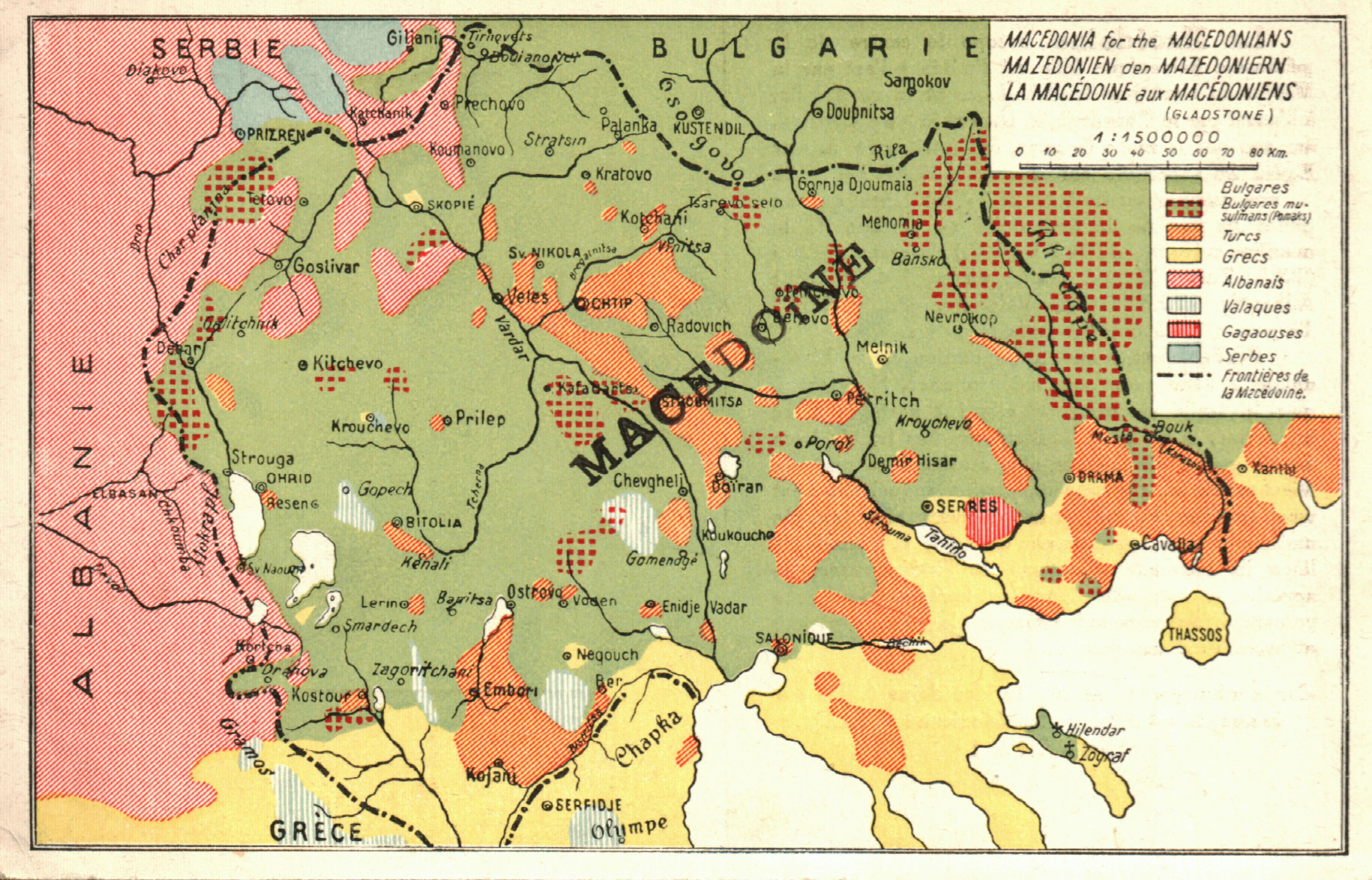
A postcard containing the motto "Macedonia for the Macedonians" with a demographic map of the region, issued by the Union of Macedonian Students in Vienna during the 1920s. According to the map, the ethnic composition of the population included Bulgarians, Bulgarian Muslims (Pomaks), Greeks, Albanians, Serbs, Turks, Gagauzes and "Vlachs" (Aromanians and Megleno-Romanians).

Macedonians as an obsolete terminology was used in regional and in ethnographic sense and had several meanings, different from these used mostly today. The name of Macedonia was revived in the Balkans during the early 19th century as a result of Western European philhellenism. The designation Macedonian arose at the eve of the 20th century and was used beyond but its meanings have changed during the time, and some of them are rarely used anymore.

== Meanings ==
=== Umbrella term ===
At first place it was an umbrella term to designate all the inhabitants of the region of Macedonia, regardless of their ethnic origin. "Macedonians" as an umbrella term covered Bulgarians, Turks, Greeks, Aromanians, Albanians, Jews, Serbs, and some saw themselves even as ethnic Macedonians. Simultaneously a political concept was created, to encompass all these "Macedonians" in the area, into a separate supranational entity, based on their collective Macedonian regional identity. The new state would to be cantonized, something as "Switzerland on the Balkans". An example is the bylaws of the Macedonian Patriotic Organization. As written originally during 1920s, the bylaws' concept of "Macedonians" had only geographic and not ethnographic meaning, and was equally valid for all ethnic groups in Macedonia. As a remnant from these times, even the latest version of this bylaws, from 2016, retains this very definition of the terms “Macedonians” and "Macedonian emigrants".

=== Slavic Macedonians ===
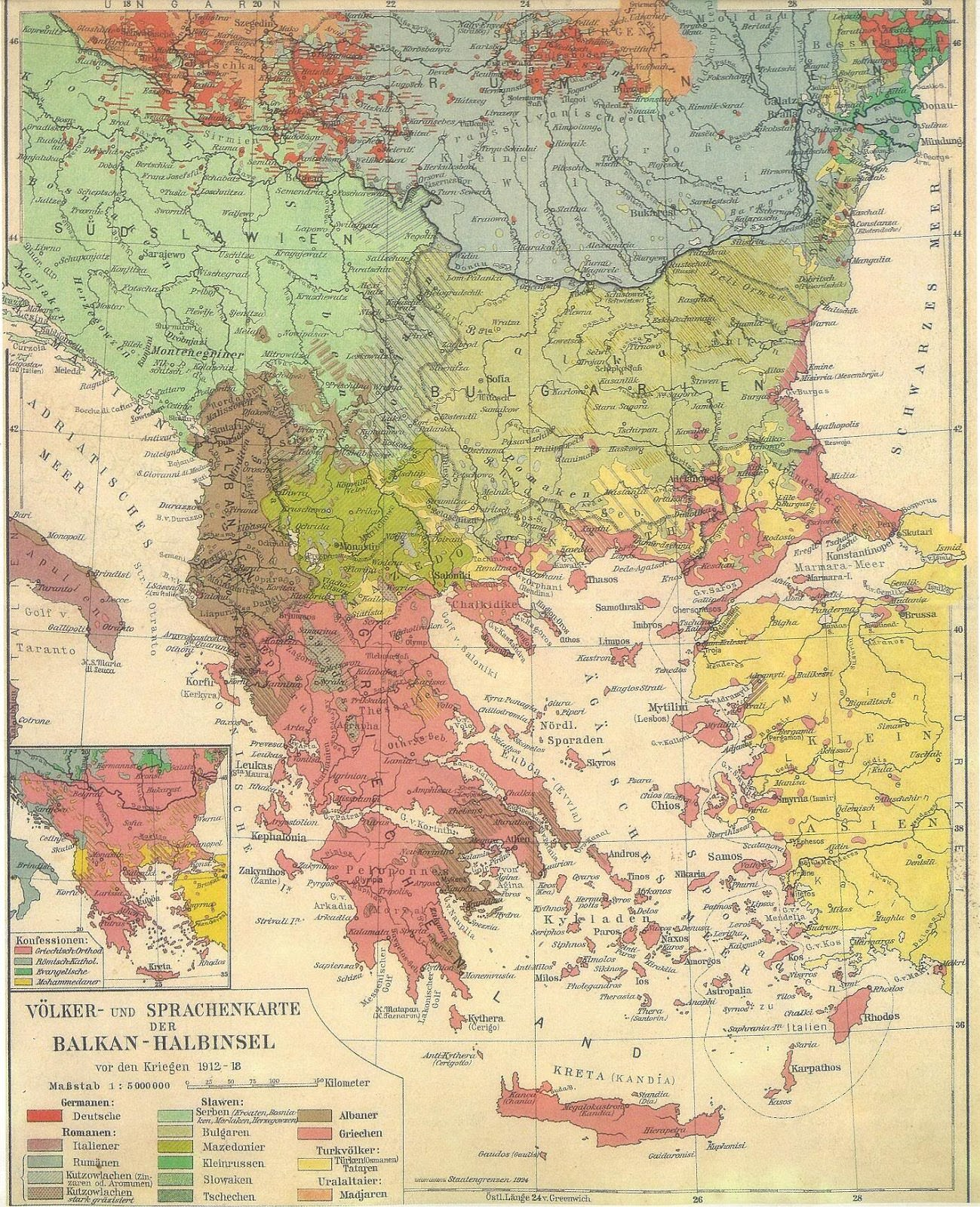
Peoples and languages map of the Balkan Peninsula before the wars 1912–18, in German (Historical Old Map Collection from 1924). Macedonian Slavs in Western Macedonia are depicted as separate ethnicity, while in Eastern part, as Bulgarians. After Bulgaria lost World War I, when it controlled most of Macedonia, the expansionist ideas of the Serb Jovan Cvijić, incl. on the distinctiveness of the Slavic Macedonians, became the point of reference for most Balkan ethnographic maps.

At that time, this designation was used also to describe the Slavic speakers in Ottoman Macedonia, but not as a separate ethnic group, because this population was defined then mostly as Bulgarians, while their association with Bulgaria was universally accepted. However, since the second half of the 19th century there were cases when Macedonian was used to define and express a separate ethnicity. The supranational autonomism and separatism of the Internal Macedonian Revolutionary Organization undoubtedly stimulated the development of Macedonian nationalism, particularly from the leftist activists. One such activist was Pavel Shatev, who described the first precursor of the process of an ethno-national differentiation between Bulgarian and Macedonian, while some people he met at the eve of the 20th century felt “only Bulgarians”, but others despite being "Bulgarians by nationality", felt themselves "Macedonians" above all. During the interbellum Macedonian national ideas were on the rise among the leftist diaspora in Bulgaria, and in Vardar Macedonia, then part of the Kingdom of Yugoslavia, especially during 1930s. Ultimately the designation Macedonian, changed its status in 1944, and went from being predominantly a regional ethnic denomination, to a national one within the framework of Democratic Federal Macedonia. Nevertheless, among the older Macedonian immigrant communities, as for example in the USA and Canada, the terms Macedonian, Bulgarian and Macedonian Bulgarian, kept their similar meanings in the first decades after the Second World War.

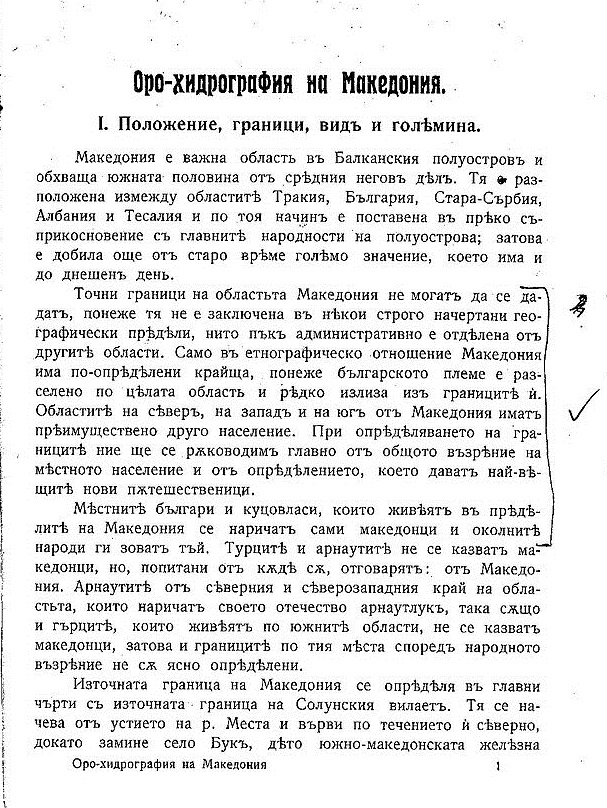
The first page of Orohydrography of Macedonia by Vasil Kanchov (1911). According to him, the local Bulgarians and Aromanians who lived in the area called themselves Macedonians, and the surrounding nations also called them so. He also added that the Turks, Albanians and Greeks don't call themselves Macedonians.

=== Macedo-Romanians ===
At the eve of the 20th century, the Bulgarian teacher Vasil Kanchov marked that the local Bulgarians and Aromanians called themselves "Macedonians", and that the surrounding people also called them in the same way. These "Vlachs" (Aromanians and Megleno-Romanians) tended to call themselves Macedonians after moving to urban areas. The urban Aromanians were usually pro-Greek. They also were called by the Romanians as "Macedo-Romanians" because some of them emigrated to Romania from Macedonia during the early 20th century. The designation "Macedonian" for them was also widespread in Romania. When the researcher Keith Brown visited North Macedonia on the eve of the 21st century, he realised that the local Aromanian dialect still had no way to distinguish "Macedonians" from "Bulgarians" and that the locals used the designation "Bulgarians" for both ethnic groups.

== See also ==
- Macedonian (disambiguation)
- Macedonia (terminology)
- Macedonian struggle
