= Kostadin =

Kostadin is a variant of Konstantin (Constantine). It may refer to:

- Kostadin Adzhov (born 1991), Bulgarian footballer
- Kostadin Alakushev, Bulgarian revolutionary in the Internal Macedonian-Adrianople Revolutionary Organization (IMARO)
- Kostadin Angelov (born 1973), Bulgarian coach
- Kostadin Bashov (born 1982), Bulgarian footballer
- Kostadin Dyakov (born 1985), Bulgarian footballer
- Kostadin Dzhambazov (born 1980), former Bulgarian footballer
- Kostadin Gadzhalov (born 1989), Bulgarian footballer
- Kostadin Georgiev (born 1986), Bulgarian footballer
- Kostadin Hazurov (born 1985), Bulgarian footballer
- Kostadin Kostadinov (born 1959), retired Bulgarian football player
- Kostadin Kostadinov (professor) (born 1955), Bulgarian scientist
- Kostadin Markov (born 1979), Bulgarian footballer
- Kostadin Stoyanov (born 1986), Bulgarian footballer
- Kostadin Varimezov (1918–2002), famous Bulgarian bagpiper (gaidar)
- Kostadin Velkov (born 1989), Bulgarian footballer
- Kostadin Vidolov (born 1970), Bulgarian former footballer
- Kostadin Yanchev (born 1963), Bulgarian former footballer

== See also ==
- Kostadinite
