= Serres revolutionary district =

19th-century Bulgarian revolutionary area

- Серски революционен окръг
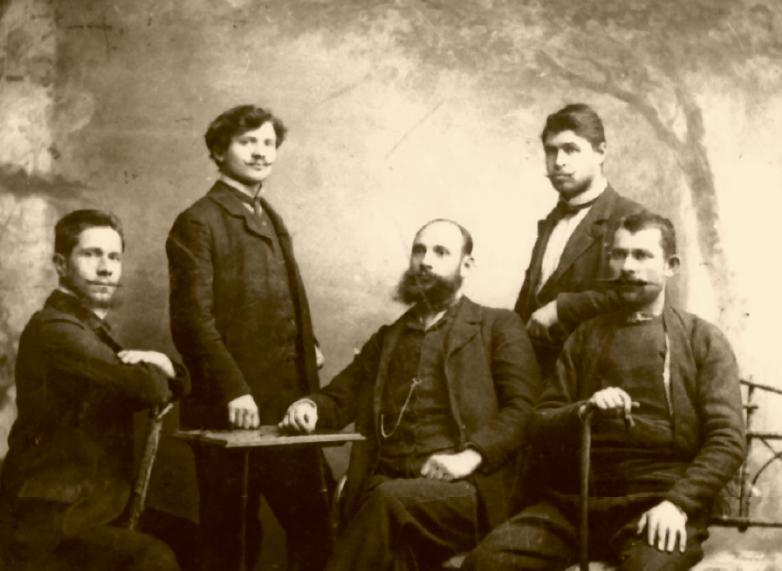
- Sandanski (middle) with part of the Sandanists (from left to right): Chudomir Kantardzhiev, Stoyo Hadziev and Georgi Skrizhovski
- Leader: Yane Sandanski
- Dates active: Established July 1894
- Headquarters: Serres
- Part of: Internal Macedonian Revolutionary Organization
- Wars: Ilinden-Preobrazhenie Uprising

The Serres revolutionary district (Bulgarian: Серски революционен окръг; Macedonian: Серски револуционерен округ) was an organizational grouping of the Internal Macedonian Revolutionary Organization in the Ottoman Empire.

== Activity ==
The most famous leader of the group was Yane Sandanski, thus his supporters were called the Serres group or Sandanists, they were one of the leading activists of the left-wing of IMRO. This rebel group had its headquarters in Serres and was active in eastern parts of the region of Macedonia. The district was the last to revolt in the Ilinden-Preobrazhenie Uprising on 27 September 1903 on the Feast of the Holy Cross (Krastovden Uprising ). After the uprising, the group blamed the leaders of the IMRO for its defeat and subsequently, the Sandanists published their own printed organ, the newspaper "Revolutionary Leaf" (Революционен лист) between 1904 and 1906.

In 1908 led to a disintegration of the organization - Yane Sandanski and Hristo Chernopeev contacted the Young Turks and started legal operation. After the disintegration of IMRO, the two first tried to set up the Macedonian-Adrianople Revolutionary Organization (MARO). Initially, the group developed only propaganda activities, until Sandanski was injured by Tane Nikolov on September 24, 1908, in an attempt for the former's life. Later, the congress for MARO's official inauguration failed. Sandanski and Hristo Chernopeev abandoned the idea of MARO, and they started to work towards a creation of the Peoples' Federative Party. On July 18, 1909, Sandanski proclaimed the "Manifesto to all peoples in the empire", a work written by Pavel Deliiradev. Another who was involved in the creation of PFP was Dimo Hadzhidimov, who emphasized that the answer is not in the dissolution of the Ottoman Empire, but rather in regional self-government within the empire. In 1909 the group around Sandanski and Chernopeev participated in the rally of the Young Turks to Istanbul that led to the deposition of sultan Abdul Hamid II from the throne. In January 1910, Hristo Chernopeev left the party and founded the Bulgarian People's Macedonian-Adrianople Revolutionary Organization. In April 1910 the central committee, led by Dimitar Vlahov, voted Yane Sandanski out of the organization. In August 1910 the party was banned by the Ottoman authorities.

Right before the Balkan Wars, Sandanski's group resisted against the Ottomans, as he anticipated that his region of influence was going to be occupied by Bulgaria, so it was sensible to be allied with them in hope of gaining some kind of autonomy of his rule. He put the Sandanists at the service of the Bulgarian army during the Balkan Wars. After these wars, most of Macedonia was ceded to Greece and Serbia, while Pirin Macedonia was ceded to Bulgaria, and the government forbade any influence of Sandanski despite his support for the Bulgarian army previously. Sandanski was assassinated in April 1915 by local right-wing IMRO rivaling faction activists. During First World War, the members of the group supported the Bulgarian army and joined Bulgarian war-time authorities when they took control over parts of Greek and Serbian Macedonia. Following Sandanski's assassination, the district was under the leadership of Dimo Hadzhidimov, Chudomir Kantardzhiev and Georgi Skrizhovski, who followed Sandanski's ideas. After World War I, the Serres faction, under Dimo Hadzhidimov's initiative, issued the Serres Declaration, and formed subsequently the Provisional representation of the former United Internal Revolutionary Organization. The declaration's goal was an autonomous Macedonia and Balkan Federation in which Macedonia would be a separate entity. Among the members of the district, there was a strong inclination toward left-wing ideas.

== See also ==
- Macedonian Federative Organisation
