= People's Federative Party (Bulgarian Section) =

Political party in the Ottoman Empire

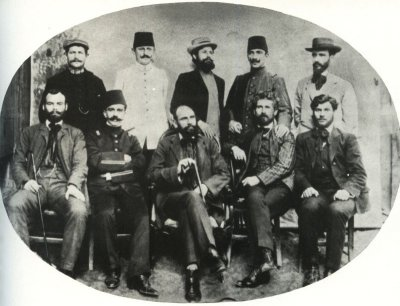
Dimo Hadzhidimov (standing first from right), Todor Panitsa and Yane Sandanski (sitting second and third from right) with the Young Turks.

The People's Federative Party (Bulgarian Section) (Bulgarian: Народна федеративна партия (българска секция)) or just People's Federative Party (PFP) (Macedonian: Народна федеративна партија (НФП)) was a Bulgarian political party in the Ottoman Empire, created after the Young Turk Revolution, by members of the left wing of the Internal Macedonian Adrianople Revolutionary Organization (IMARO). The Party decided to name itself Bulgarian Section, since it was hoped that other nationalities from European Turkey would adopt its program and form their own ethnic sections, but this didn't happen. Per its statute members of the Bulgarian Section could be Bulgarians, who are Ottoman citizens, at least 20 years old. It functioned for one year from August 1909 until August 1910. Their main political rival was the Union of the Bulgarian Constitutional Clubs.

== Origins ==
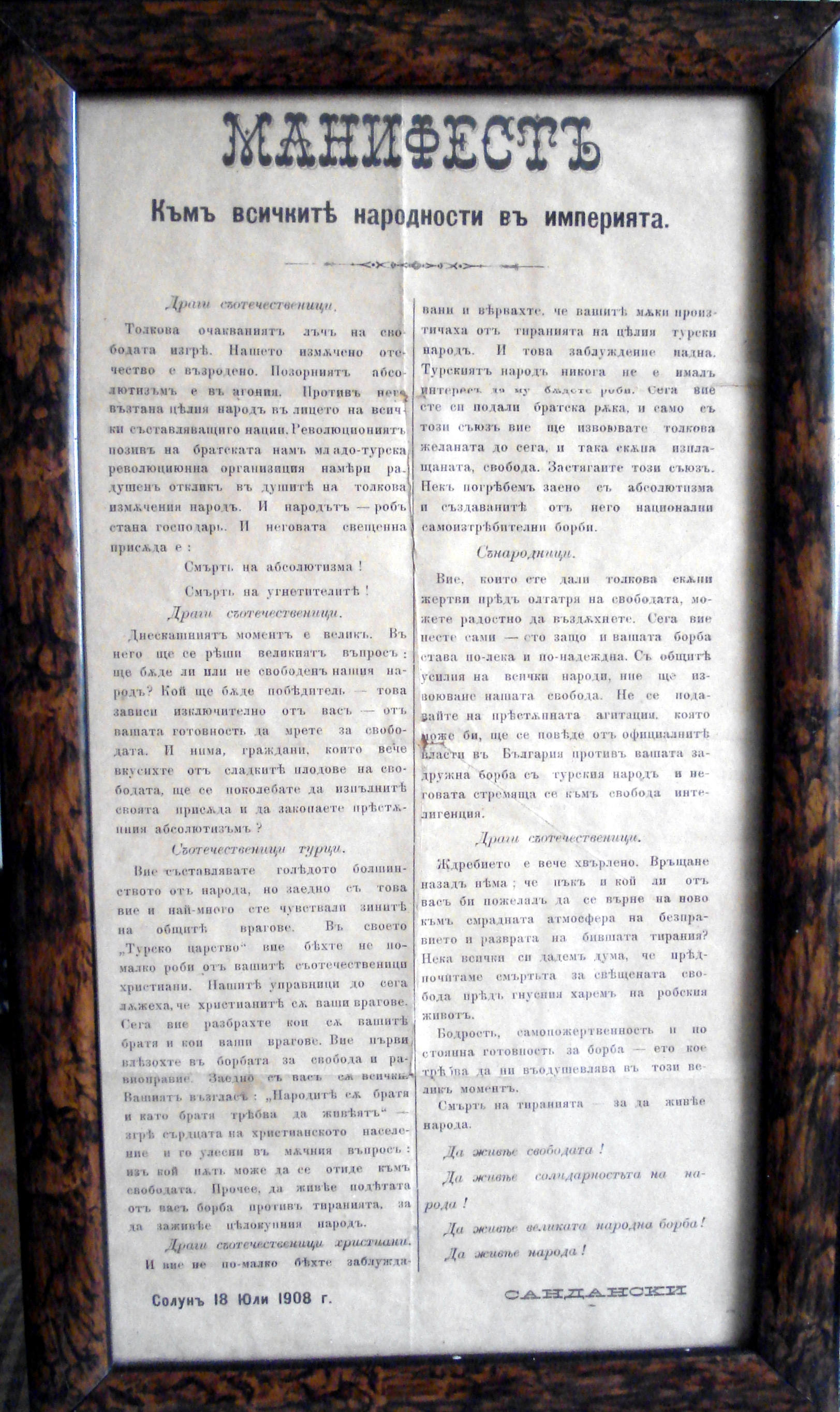
The manifesto proclaimed by Yane Sandanski at the beginning of the Young Turk Revolution.

The Kyustendil congress of IMARO in 1908 led to a disintegration of the organization - Yane Sandanski and Hristo Chernopeev contacted the Young Turks and started legal operation. After the disintegration of IMARO, the two first tried to set up the Macedonian-Adrianople Revolutionary Organization (MARO). Initially, the group developed only propaganda activities, until Sandanski was injured by Tane Nikolov on September 24, 1908, in an attempt for the former's life. Later, the congress for MARO's official inauguration failed. Sandanski and Chernopeev abandoned the idea of MARO, and they started to work towards a creation of the Peoples' Federative Party. On July 18, 1909, Sandanski proclaimed the "Manifesto to all peoples in the empire", a work written by Pavel Deliiradev, who subsequently drafted the statute of the PFP, as well as its program. Another who was involved in the creation of PFP was Dimo Hadzhidimov, who emphasized that the answer is not in the dissolution of the Ottoman Empire, but rather in regional self-government within the empire. In 1909 the group around Sandanski and Chernopeev participated in the rally of the Young Turks to Istanbul that led to the deposition of sultan Abdul Hamid II from the throne.

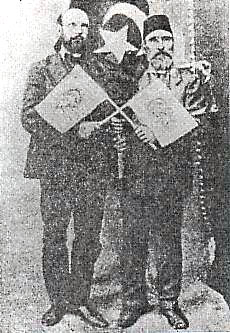
Yane Sandanski and Nuredin Beg.

== Inauguration ==
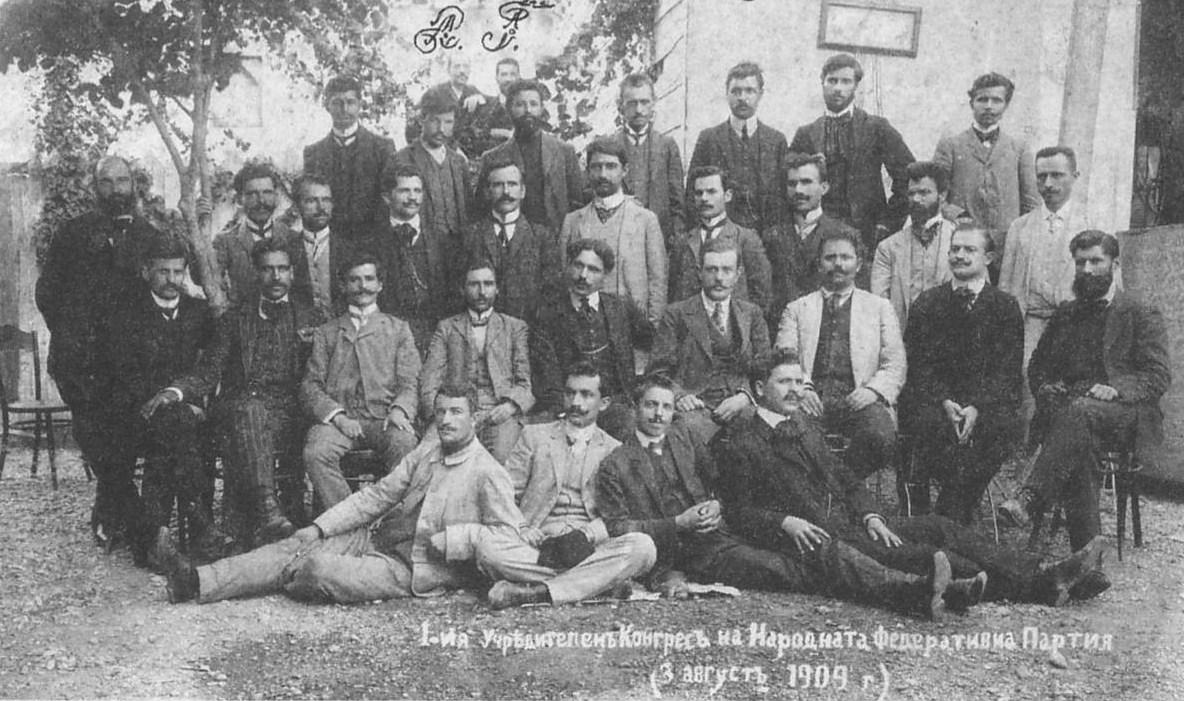
Delegates of the First Congress of the PFP on 10 August 1909.

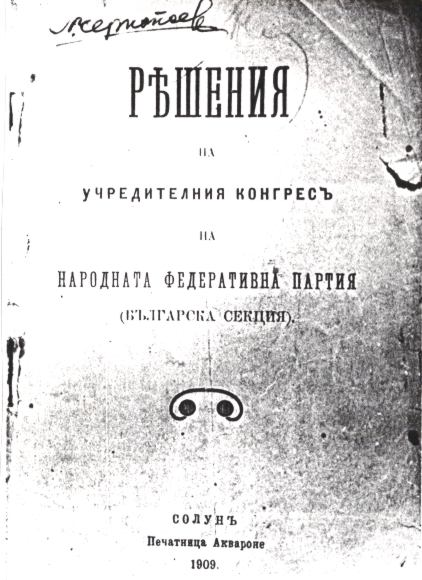
First page of the statute of the PFP (Bulgarian Section).

The inauguration meeting of the PFP was held from August 3 to August 10, 1909 in cafe "Splendid Palace" in Solun. The representatives of 15 local organization attended the congress - Hristo Yankov and Dimitar Vlahov - Solun, Hristo Mendikarov and T. Klifov - Gorni Poroy, Stoyo Hadzhiev and Iliya Bizhev - Valovishta, Yane Sandanski and Georgi Kazepov - Melnik, Stoyko Pashkulov and Aleksandar Bozhikov - Nevrokop, Dimitar Koshtanov and G. Zahariev - Gorna Dzhumaya, Gerasim Ognyanov - Maleshevsko, Kostadin Samardzhiev and Hristo Chernopeev - Strumitsa, Pando Popmanushev - Petrich, Metodi Popgoshev and Dimitar Miraschiev - Veles, Dobri Daskalov and Doncho Lazarov - Tikvesh, Ivan Ilyukliev and Nikola Petrov - Kukush, Ivan Manolev - Bitola, Yordan Shurkov and F. Bayraktarov - Skopje, Georgi Skrizhovski and Ivan Elezov - Razlog, Taskata Spasov-Serski and Hristo Stamboliev - Ser, Todor Panitsa - Drama, Angel Popkirov - the region around Adrianople, B. Hristov - Dolni Poroy and Anastas Mitrev - Ohrid. As it is described in some of the party's official documents, it stood behind "the interests of the majority of the Bulgarian population - land owners that do not get state support, small land owners, craftsmen and small merchants." A major goal of the organization was the reform of the Ottoman Empire into a federation, which included a creation of autonomous vilayets in Macedonia, Albania, Armenia. Six committees were organized throughout the party's existence. The party's agenda was maintained by a commission that included Sandanski, Dimitar Vlahov, Dimitar Koshtanov and Ivan Manolov. The party's central committee consisted of Anastas Matliev, Dimitar Vlahov and Hristo Yankov, and party advisors Aleksandar Buynov, Dobri Daskalov, Dimitar Koshtanov, Yane Sandanski, Hristo Chernopeev and Yordan Shurkov. Dimitar Vlahov and Hristo Dalchev were voted as deputies of the PFP (Bulgarian Section) in the Ottoman Parliament.

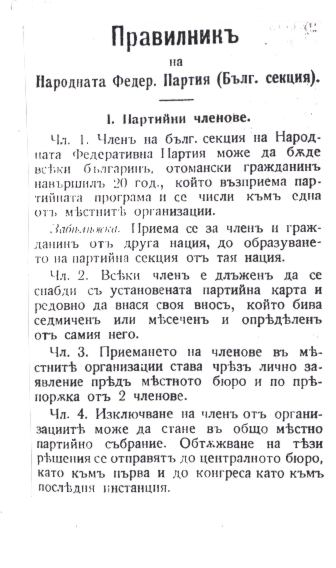
Statute of the PFP (Bulgarian Section): Sec. 1: A member of the Bulg. Section of the Peoples' Federative Party can be any Bulgarian that is Ottoman citizen of age over 20, who accepts the party's agenda and participates in one of its local organizations. NOTE: A citizen of another nationality is accepted as a member, until a party section for that nationаlity is established.

== Activity ==
At the Second Congress of PFP, which ended on 12 August 1909, two groups were formed - one extreme socialist around Angel Tomov and Dimitar Vlahov and the other moderate - around Sandanski, supported by the Ser revolutionaries. The newspaper "Narodna Volya" (Peoples' Will) was the official organ of PFP, and was redacted by Tomov and Vlahov. There was a rift within the party on the role of the Bulgarian Exarchate, because the Young Turks expressed desires for its abolition. Yane Sandanski was personally involved in the defense of the church. The newspaper "Rabotnicheska Iskra" (Worker's Spark), organized by Vasil Glavinov described the two rivaling ethnic Bulgarian parties in the Ottoman Empire at the time, the PFP (Bulgarian Section) and the Union of the Bulgarian Constitutional Clubs. According to the newspaper, both of the parties, the former a defender of the poorer Bourgeois (small merchants, artisans, peasant owners, the grocers and innkeepers), the latter - of the richer, were nationalist and were led by desires of unification with Bulgaria. However the PFP would only accept it on condition that there is no monarchism in Bulgaria anymore. The regions in which PFP (Bulgarian Section) was most popular were in and around Strumica, Ser and Drama.

== Dissolution ==
In January 1910, Hristo Chernopeev and some of his followers left the party and founded the Bulgarian People's Macedonian-Adrianople Revolutionary Organization. In April 1910 the central committee, led by Dimitar Vlahov, voted Yane Sandanski out of the organization. A new central committee was formed with Dr. Hristo Tenchev as its president and members Dimitar Miraschiev, Chudomir Kantardzhiev, Aleksandar Buynov and Taskata Spasov-Serski. In August 1910 the party was banned by the Ottoman authorities.

== See also ==
- Kostadin Alakushev

== Sources ==
- Стравот и желбите на македонизмот во карантин (The Complaints of Macedonism are in quarantine) (in Macedonian)
- Българското национално дело през време на Хуриета (The Bulgarian National Problem during the Second Constitutional Era (in Bulgarian)
- Димитър Влахов, Борбите на македонския народ за освобождение (Dimitar Vlahov, Struggle of the Macedonian peoples for liberation (in Bulgarian)
- "Димо Хаджидимов. Живот и дело", Боян Кастелов, София, 1985 (Dimo Hadzhidimov, Life and Deeds, Boyan Kastelov, Sofia, 1985) (in Bulgarian)
- Антони Гиза,Балканските държави и македонският въпрос (Antoni Giza, The Balkan Nations and the Macedonian Question) (in Bulgarian)
