= Strumica revolutionary district =

- Струмишки революционенъ окрѫгъ
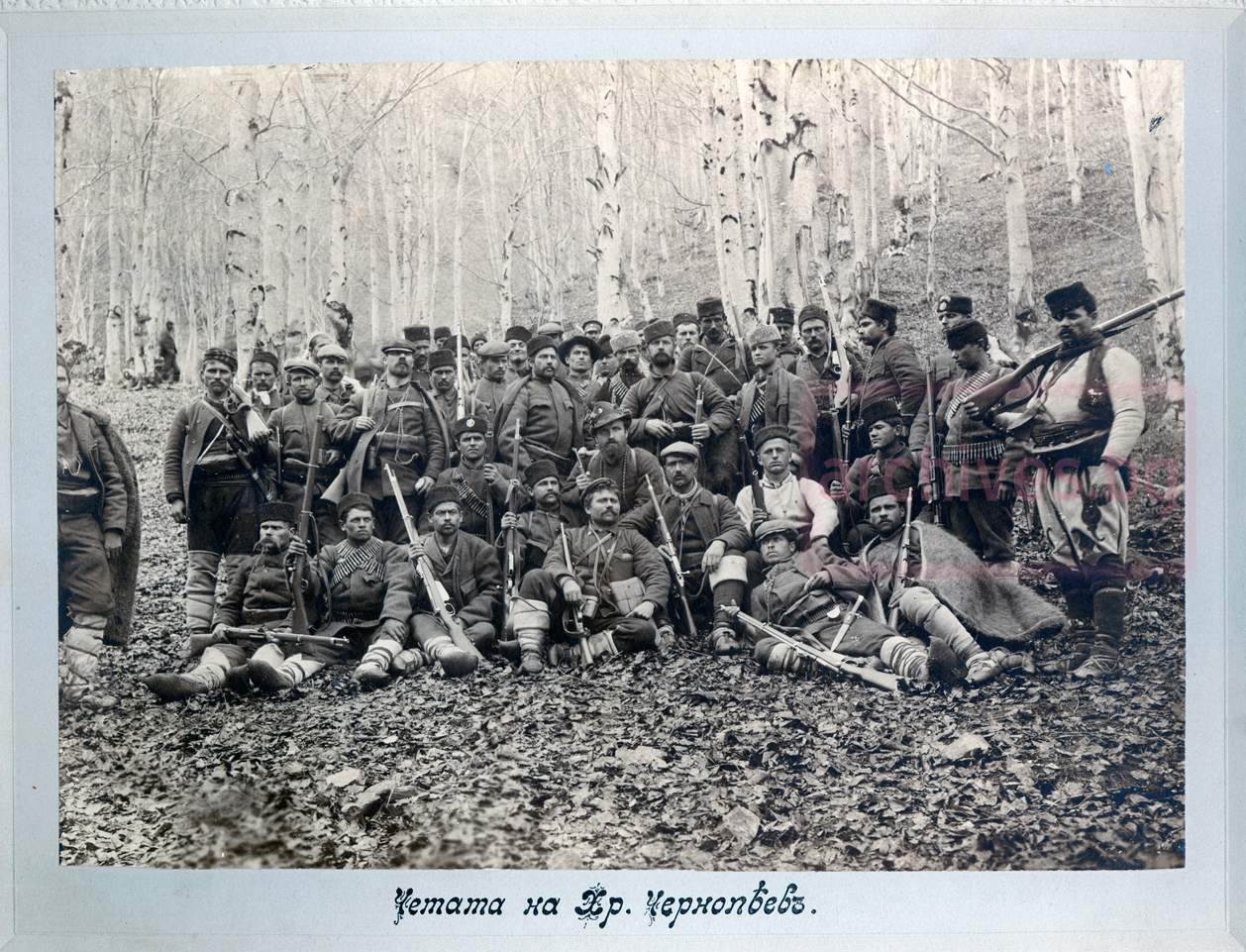
- Leader: Hristo Chernopeev
- Dates active: established July 1894
- Part of: Internal Macedonian-Adrianople Revolutionary Organization

The Strumica revolutionary district (Macedonian/Bulgarian: Струмички револуционерен округ/Струмишки революционен окръг) was an organizational grouping of the Internal Macedonian-Adrianople Revolutionary Organization. The most famous leader of the group was Hristo Chernopeev. This rebel group was active in eastern Vardar Macedonia and part of western Pirin Macedonia.
