= Yane Sandanski =

Macedonian Bulgarian revolutionary (1872–1915)

Voivode Yane Sandanski
- Яне Сандански
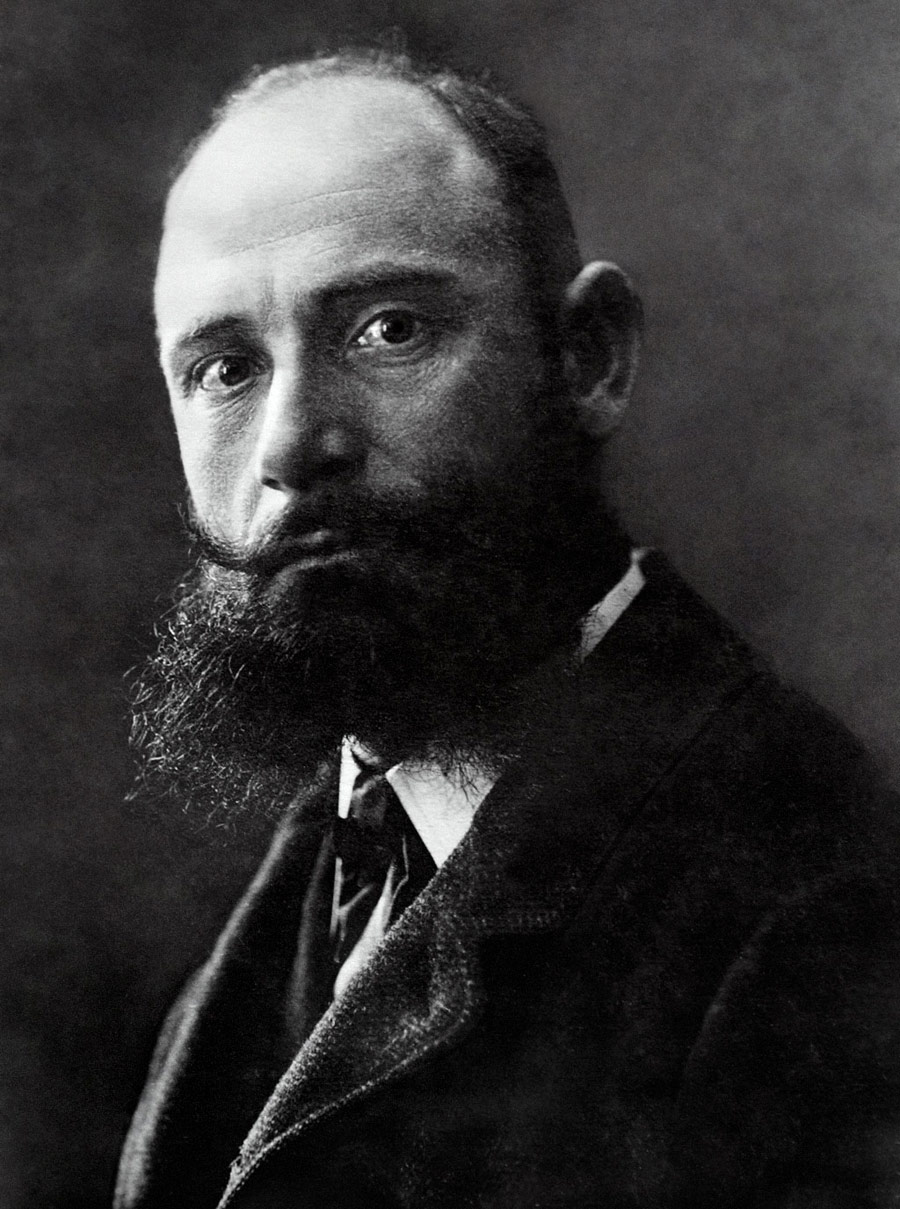
- Yane Sandanski c. 1900
- Born: Yane Ivanov Sandanski; 18 May 1872; Vlahi, Ottoman Empire
- Died: 22 April 1915 (aged 42) near Pirin, Tsardom of Bulgaria
- Burial place: Rozhen Monastery
- Military career
- Allegiance: SMAC; IMRO; Tsardom of Bulgaria
- Branch: Bulgarian Army
- Conflicts: Ilinden Uprising; Macedonian Struggle; Balkan Wars: First Balkan War; Second Balkan War

Yane Ivanov Sandanski (Bulgarian: Яне Иванов Сандански, Macedonian: Јане Иванов Сандански, romanized: Jane Ivanov Sandanski; Originally spelled in older Bulgarian orthography as Яне Ивановъ Сандански (Yane Ivanov Sandanski); 18 May 1872 – 22 April 1915) was a Macedonian Bulgarian revolutionary and leader of the left wing of the Internal Macedonian-Adrianople Revolutionary Organisation (IMARO).

In his youth Sandanski was involved in the anti-Ottoman struggle, joining initially the Supreme Macedonian-Adrianople Committee (SMAC). As an activist of the Liberal Party (Radoslavists), at that time he became the head of the local prison in Dupnitsa. Later Sandanski switched to the IMARO by pledging his loyalty to Gotse Delchev. He was the mastermind behind the abduction of American Protestant missionary Ellen Stone in order to secure funds for IMARO. After the Ilinden Uprising, Sandanski became the leader of the Serres revolutionary district and of the socialist inspired left-wing ("federalist") faction of IMARO. With his superior leadership he managed to establish a "state within the state" in northeastern Ottoman Macedonia. The left-wing advocated for autonomy for Macedonia and Adrianople regions, and the subsequent creation of a Balkan Federation, attaining equality for all its subjects and nationalities. Sandanski and the left-wing also vigorously resisted the idea of unification of Macedonia with Bulgaria. During the Second Constitutional Era he became an Ottoman politician, collaborating with the Young Turks and founding the People's Federative Party (Bulgarian Section). Sandanski took up arms on the side of Bulgaria during the Balkan Wars (1912–13). Afterwards, he became involved in Bulgarian public life again, supporting the Democratic Party, but began plotting to assassinate the Bulgarian Tsar Ferdinand I and was assassinated by the rivalling IMARO right-wing faction activists on the order of Todor Aleksandrov.

He is recognised as a national hero in both Bulgaria and North Macedonia, but his identity is also disputed between both countries. While People's Republic of Bulgaria honoured him, after the fall of communism he has been described by Bulgarian nationalist historians as a betrayer of the Bulgarians and collaborator with the Turks. On the contrary, in North Macedonia, the positive connotation of him, created in the times of Communist Yugoslavia is still alive, and he has been portrayed there as a fighter against the "Bulgarian aspirations in Macedonia" and the "Turkish yoke."

== Life ==
=== Early life and activity ===
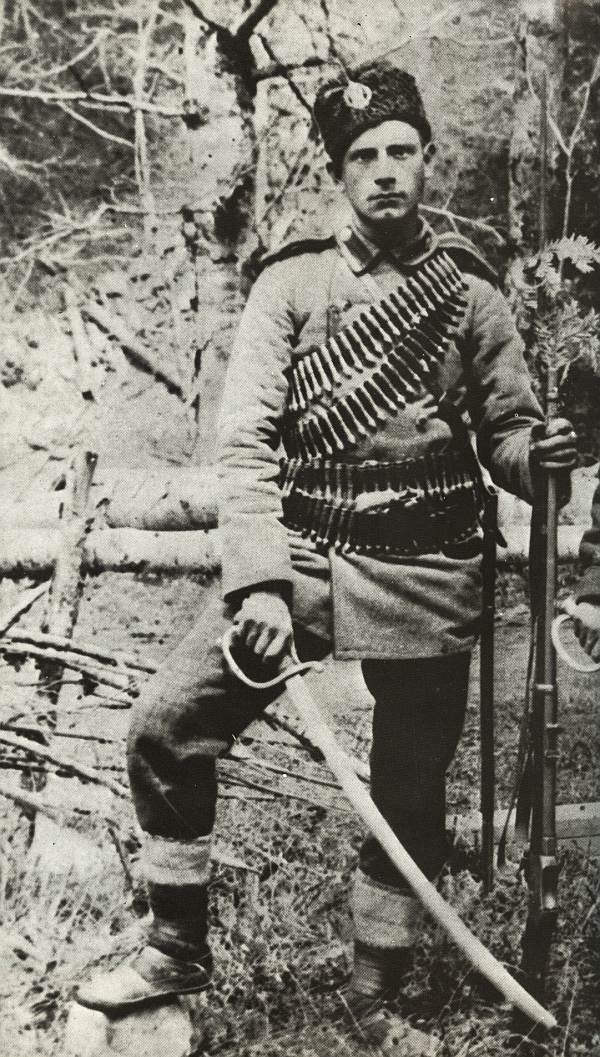
Yane Sandanski in the Bulgarian Army c. 1892

Sandanski was born on 18 May 1872 in the village of Vlahi near Kresna, then in the Ottoman Empire, now in Bulgaria. He was the third and last child of Ivan and Milka, after Todor and Sofia. His father Ivan participated in the Kresna-Razlog Uprising as a standard-bearer in a rebel detachment. In 1879, after the suppression of the uprising, his family moved to Dupnitsa, in the recently established Principality of Bulgaria, where Sandanski received his elementary education. He had to drop out of school after completing two years of post-elementary education due to poverty and became the apprentice of a shoemaker. From 1892 to 1894 he was subject to compulsory military service in the Bulgarian army, as part of the Thirteenth Regiment which was stationed in Kyustendil, and he was demobilized with the rank of corporal. He joined initially the Supreme Macedonian-Adrianople Committee (SMAC) in 1895 during the Committee's incursion into the Pomak-inhabited regions of the Western Rhodopes. In 1897 in Dupnitsa, a new detachment of the Supreme Committee was formed, under the leadership of Krastyo Zahariev, where Sandanski joined too. After the detachment entered Pirin Mountains, it encountered Ottoman troops. In one of the battles Sandanski was wounded and his detachment returned him to Bulgaria for treatment. In February 1899, he was appointed head of the Dupnitsa prison as result of his active support of the Radoslavov's wing of the Liberal Party which came to power in January. Later that year he switched to the IMARO after he was recruited by Nikola Maleshevski and the IMARO leader Gotse Delchev, whom he swore his loyalty after being strongly impressed by him and learned about the aims of their struggle. Sandanski built the organisation's network of committees in the districts of Serres and Gorna Dzhumaya. Due to the organisation's bad financial situation, he had to ponder different ways to earn money. He settled on kidnapping an American Protestant missionary for ransom. On 3 September 1901, a Protestant missionary named Ellen Stone along with her companions set out on horseback across the mountainous hinterlands of Macedonia and were ambushed by his detachment led by him and his friend Hristo Chernopeev. She was kidnapped along with her Bulgarian companion Katerina Tsilka. It resulted in the Miss Stone Affair - America's first modern hostage crisis. SMAC attempted to acquire both women but the attempt was foiled by Sandanski. The affair ended after the organisation received the ransom money (which was used to purchase weapons) and the women were released.

=== Activity in IMARO ===
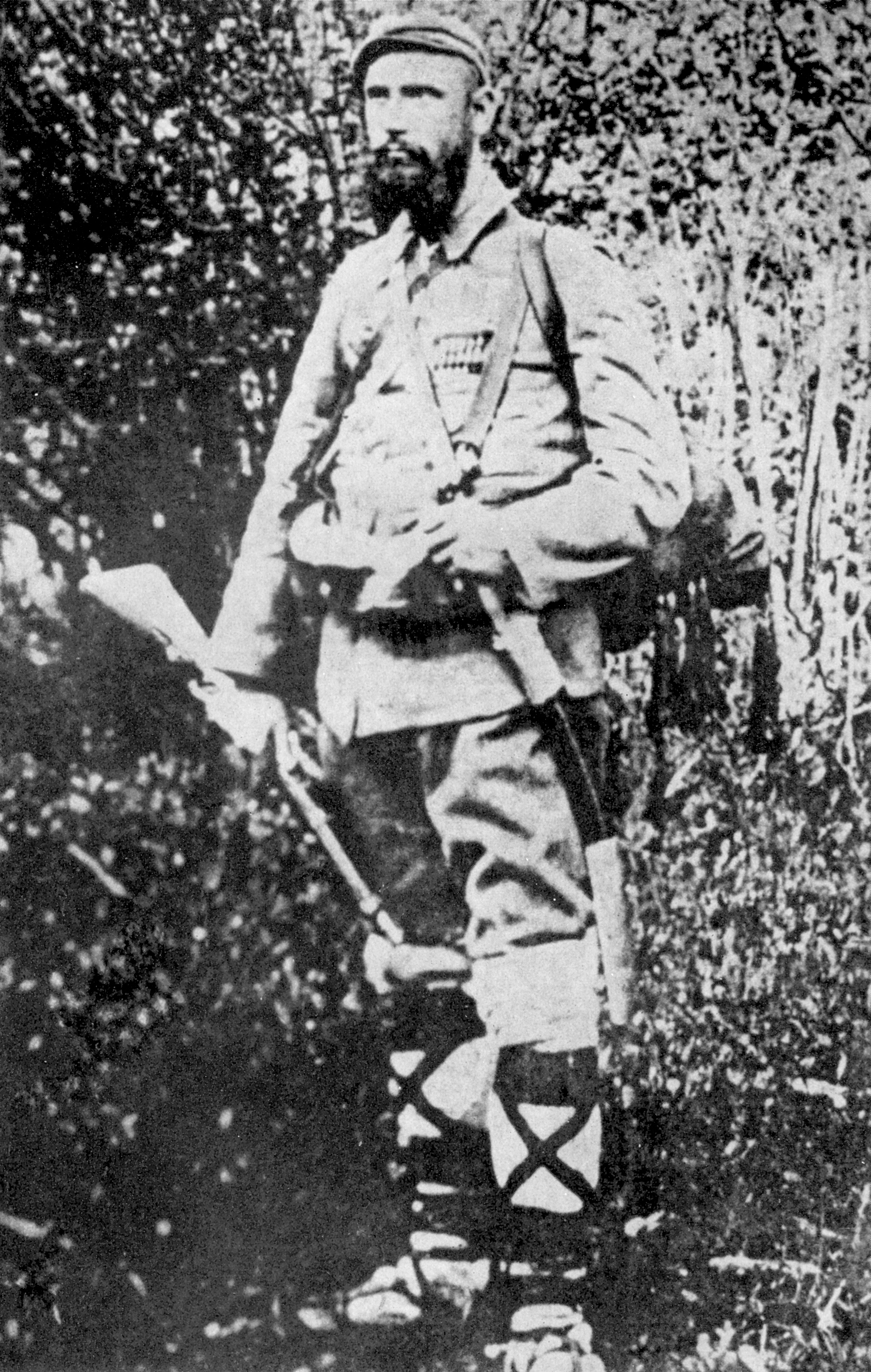
Yane Sandanski in a komitadji uniform.

In 1902, Sandanski persuaded the Aromanians (Vlachs) in the sanjak of Serres from Melnik, mostly shepherds, to join his Serres committee, in exchange for his protection against soldiers and detachments. He came to be known as the "Tsar of Pirin." Sandanski was opposed to the Ilinden Uprising, considering it premature, although he did participate in the military actions in the regions of Serres and Pirin Macedonia. The failure of the uprising resulted in the split of the IMRO into a left-wing (federalist) faction in the Serres, Strumica and Salonica districts and a right-wing (centralist) faction in the Bitola and Skopje districts. The left-wing maintained the autonomist tradition of Delchev and was correlated with Sandanski's close supporters which were called the Serres group or Sandanists. They urged not just for a fight against Ottoman rule but also against the irredentist craves from the nationalist Balkan states. Accordingly, Bulgaria was seen as a foreign hostile force, Sandanski condemned what he called "Bulgarian imperialism." It was considered that relations with capitalist Bulgaria would lead to infiltration of Bulgarian political propaganda and nationalist ideology, and subsequently their dominion over IMARO. Sandanski contemplated that Macedonians had to emancipate themselves as "self-determinig people." Following the principles of political separatism and of federalism, the left-wing supported the idea of a future Balkan Federation in which Macedonia would become a member as a separate polity after it becomes completely independent, and ultimately this would assure freedom and equality to all the nationalities in it, as well as favouring the decentralisation of IMARO. Contrary, the right-wing faction of IMARO aimed for the unification of Macedonia with Bulgaria and advocated for centralisation to counter the incursions of Serb and Greek bands into Macedonia.

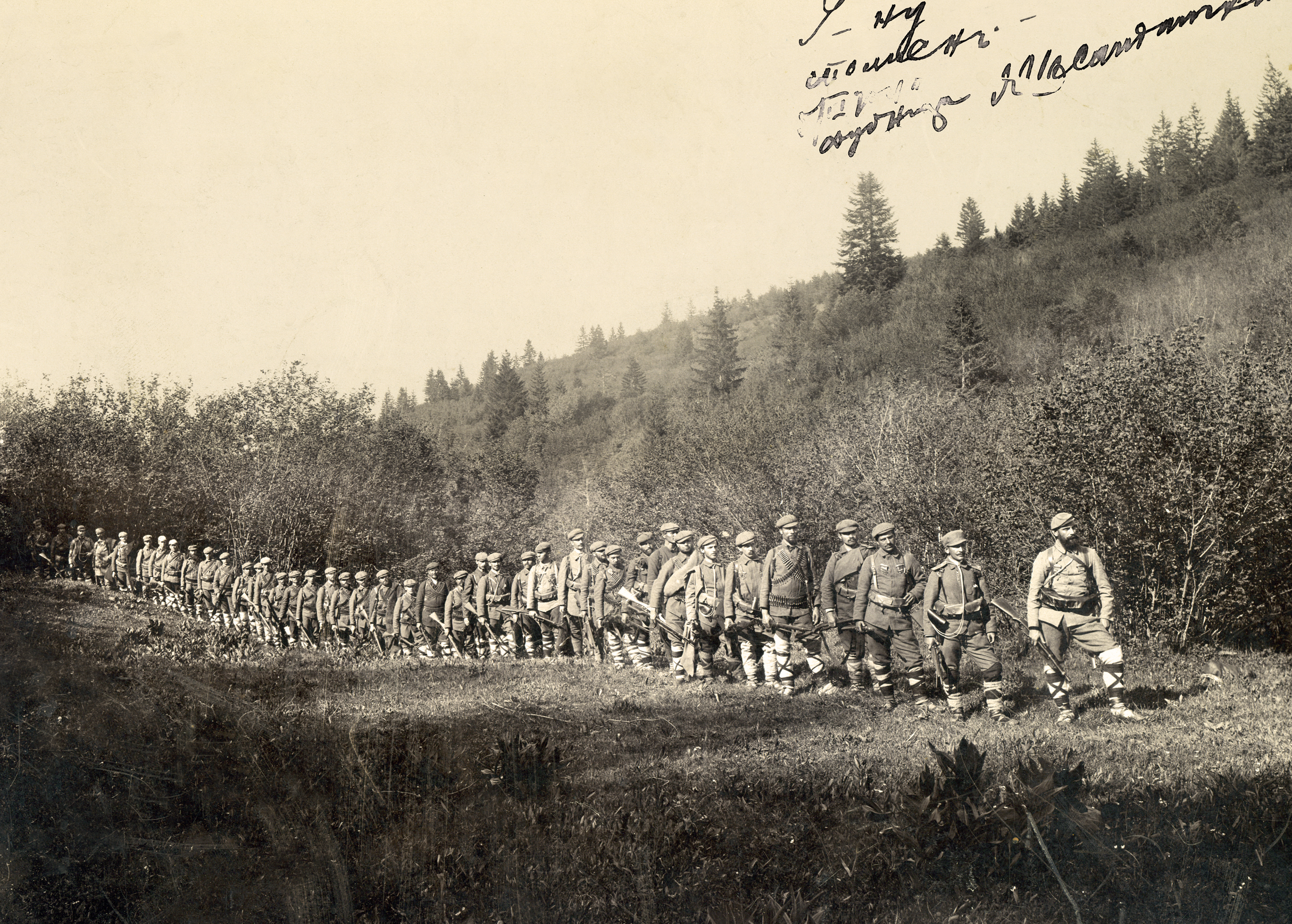
Yane Sandanski and his cheta.

The conflict between the two factions became irreversible and deadly, with the most severe one ensuing amongst Sandanski and the right-wing leader Boris Sarafov, who accused each other as traitors to the cause. Per Bulgarian historian and former IMARO member Hristo Silyanov, Sandanski's faction sentenced Sarafov to death in 1904. In October 1905, at the Rila Monastery congress, the organisation adopted the main ideas of the left-wing faction led by Sandanski and changed its name to IMARO (Internal Macedono-Adrianopolitan Revolutionary Organisation). It re-asserted the principles set by Delchev previously, which allowed membership for people from European Turkey independently of sex, religion, nationality and conviction, as well as the struggle for elimination of the chauvinistic propaganda dividing the population. Thus the ideology of political separatism was confirmed. Furthermore, it was proclaimed as an aim to oppose Bulgarian Exarchate's activities which are in the tone of Bulgarian state nationalism. At the end of the congress, Sandanski confronted Sarafov, accusing him of having accepted money from the Serbs, having facilitated the transit of Serbian detachments into Macedonia and organising his own armed groups in order to weaken the organisation and take the leadership. As well as for leading a luxurious life and misappropriating part of the funds he raised as support for the organisation during his trips through Europe. On the other hand, Sarafov, although admitting that he breached the rules, accused Sandanski of being a traitor due to his refusal to participate in the battles of the Ilinden Uprising. The personal confrontation reached a point of a nearly physical altercation between them, so the session had to be suspended. Sandanski was ready to kill Sarafov after the meeting, but he was appeased by Gyorche Petrov and convinced that this would affect the unity of IMARO leaders and weaken the struggle against the numerous enemies. Therefore, the congress ended with the delegates deciding not to examine the cases of the leaders who could have violated the rules in order to preserve the organisation's unity, but it proved short-lived.

In 1906, the left-wing faction controlled Serres and Strumica districts and for geographical reasons, as well as Sandanski's superior leadership, it rarely fought against Serbs or Greeks, but only against the Ottoman troops frequently. Sandanski created observation posts in his district order to watch for Turkish detachments, and the peasants were forced to warn or be killed. He also organised military training for all able men. Several people in his district were executed as collaborators. French consul Guillois described Sandanski as "a ferocious man, bloodthirsty...who enjoys an absolute authority over all Bulgarian villages to the northeast of Salonika." Sandanski justified the executions in an open letter to him and argued that the organisation had the right to ignore the law of the land and to punish as it saw fit. The main struggle of Sandanski was directed against the Bulgarian nationalists, IMARO right-wingers and the Bulgarian government. Therefore, the ongoing clash between the IMARO factions turned into mafia-style killings on a larger scale. The right-wing headed by Sarafov and Ivan Garvanov attempted several times to liquidate Sandanski. Sandanski blamed Sarafov of playing the Bulgarian state political game under the excuse of protecting the Macedonian communities from Greece and Serbia, while Sarafov blamed him for trying to create an utopia, coupled with anti-Bulgarian behavior, seeing it as harmful to the ultimate goal of the revolution in Macedonia. In September 1907, Mihail Daev, who was a member of the Serres revolutionary district, sent a letter to the right-wing faction, where he asserted that as long as Sandanski was alive, there was no question of uniting the organisation again. The letter was discovered by Todor Panitsa, an associate of Sandanski and on 10 October, the Serres committee sentenced Sarafov and Garvanov to death on the charge of representing the Bulgarian state with the intention to subdue the struggle for the integrity and independence of IMARO. Daev was sentenced to the same penalty as well and arrested at the end of October, upon which he killed himself. Later that year, Panitsa assassinated Sarafov and Garvanov on 10 December in Sofia. Afterwards, the Bulgarian authorities issued an arrest warrant against Sandanski. The Kyustendil congress of the right-wing faction of IMARO in 1908, sentenced him to death and ordered the assassins of Sarafov and Garvanov to be pursued and executed, which led to a final disintegration of the organisation.

=== Collaboration with the Young Turks ===
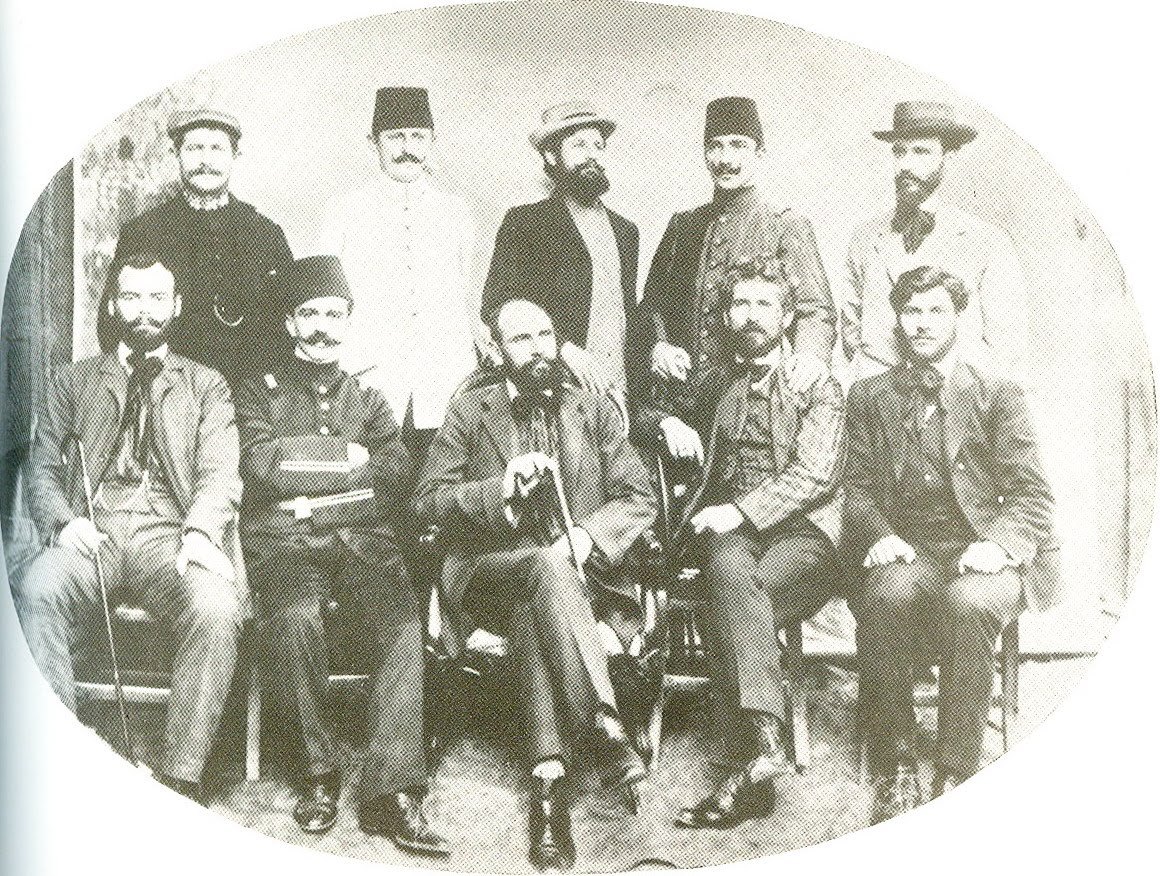
Sandanski, Dimo Hadzhidimov, Todor Panitsa and other Federalists with Young Turks

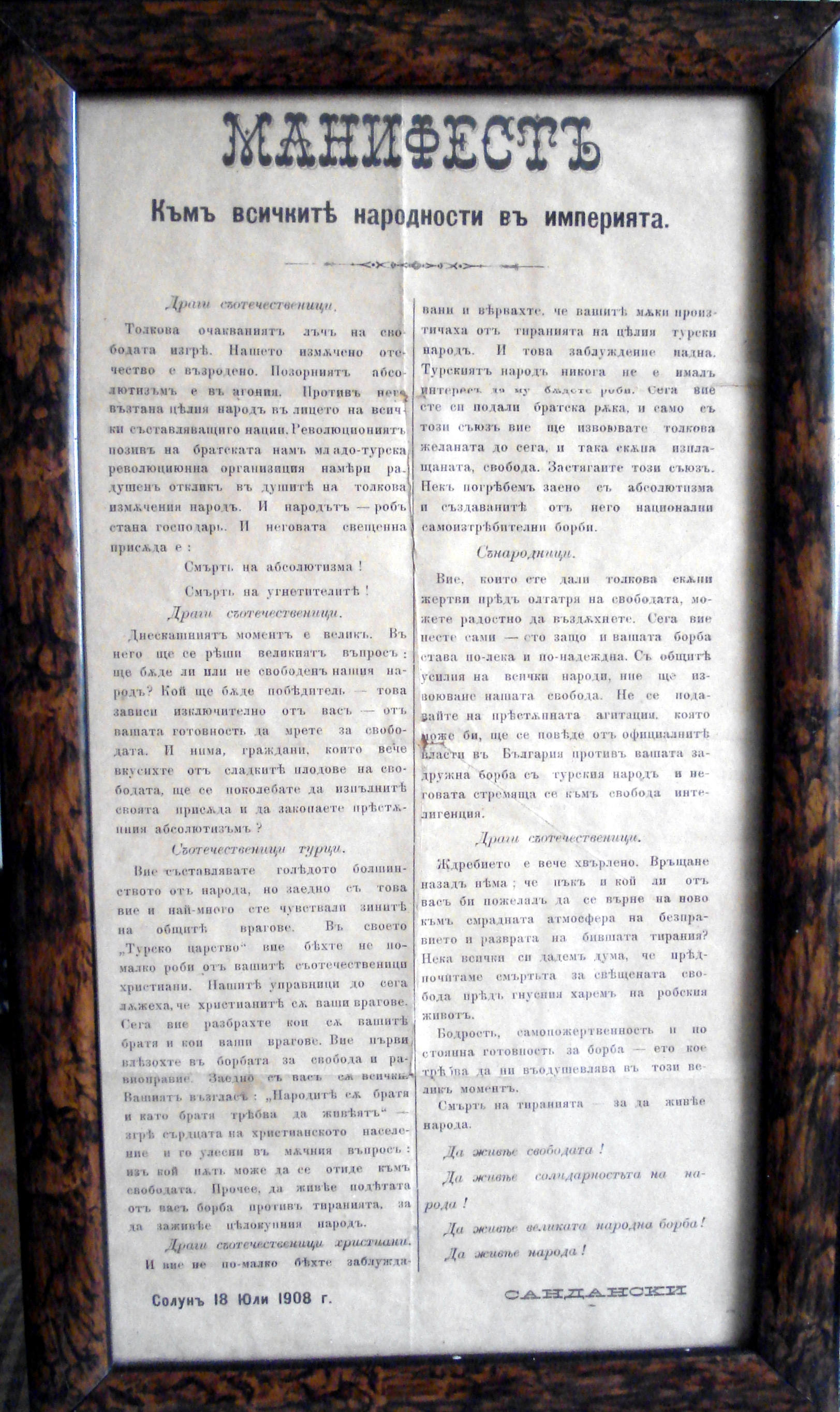
The manifesto proclaimed by Sandanski at the beginning of the Young Turk Revolution. The socialist views of its author Pavel Deliradev, who appealed to the Bulgarian-Macedonian compatriots "not to fall prey to the propaganda that might be launched by the authorities in Bulgaria against their joint struggle with the Turkish people", won the sympathies of the Young Turks.

The Young Turks movement was willing to cooperate with Macedonian revolutionary organisations since it considered that alliance with the Macedonian Christians or leastwise their good-natured neutrality was crucial for the success of their anti-Hamidian revolution. Sandanski and his faction decided to work with the Young Turks in 1907 in order to reinforce their positions against the rivaling right-wing faction and to promote their socialist ideology and political aspirations. From the beginning of 1908, the Serres group endorsed the Young Turk cause whose liberalism regarding inter-ethnic unity, equality, elimination of ethno-cultural divisions and the Hamidian despotism was perceived positively. This campaign by the Serres Regional Committee was impactful over the Slav Macedonian population, particularly concerning the pledge to settle the "agrarian question" and land distribution to the Slav peasantry, since most of them were landless. During the first days of Young Turk Revolution, the collaboration of the Macedonian leftists with the Ottoman activists was stated in a special Manifesto to all the nationalities of the Empire. Sandanski called his compatriots to discard the "propaganda" of Bulgaria in order to live together in a peaceful way with the Turkish people. The manifesto was authored by Bulgarian socialist Pavel Deliradev but signed by Sandanski, and with it they publicly announced their intent to resist the annexationist ambitions over Macedonia from the neighbouring nation-states. In early August 1908, the Serres group prepared a memorandum containing political and socio-economic proposals and submitted it to the Committee of Union and Progress (CUP) in Thessaloniki (Salonica). It suggested that the Ottoman Parliament should act as a superior legislative body with jurisdiction over the ministerial cabinet. Furthermore, loyal to the decentralisation principle, it advocated for autonomous communities and regions in which the central administration would assume authority over key civil sectors. The most progressive suggestions were general and secret voting with a new electoral system established on a proportional base, as well as ending the ethnic, religious and class privileges. For the purpose of the land distribution, the Sultan's land, vakufs and chifliks were to be expropriated. The Serres group condemned the Bulgarian, Greek and Serb separatist nationalism in Macedonia and called upon the Slav Macedonians to reject the Bulgarian national propaganda and its exponents such as the consular institutions, the Bulgarian Exarchate and the right wing of IMARO. Therefore, they also demanded the abolition of the religious and communal interference by the Bulgarian Exarchate and Greek Patriarchate. The loyalty to the Empire declared by Sandanski deliberately blurred the distinction between Macedonian and Ottoman political agenda. Among the Ottoman public, Sandanski was known as "King of the Mountains" or "Sandan Pasha" and was celebrated as one of the heroes of the revolution together with his supporters. However, despite their alliance with the Young Turks, the Serres group from the start did not have much trust in their political capacity and determination to reform and modernize the Ottoman sociopolitical system. Most likely as result of this reservations the Serres Committee kept their armed militia operational, thus resisting the Young Turks' order for complete disarmament of the Christian population.The doubts about the Young Turks soon proved right, but the cooperation continued for reasons of political expediency in relation with the struggle against the right-wing faction and the Bulgarian government with their ruler, Prince Ferdinand. Also for the reason of increasing the autonomous revolutionary activity of the left-wing faction and their political presence in the region. Sandanski acted as a regional leader of Serres, Drama, and Strumica and as advisor to the CUP, and through these roles he contributed to the appointment of local administrators and the affairs of school education.

In 1909, Sandanski and Chernopeev worked towards the creation of a left-wing political party called People's Federative Party (Bulgarian Section), whose headquarters were in Salonica. This federalist project was supposed to include different ethnic sections in itself, but this idea failed and the only section that was created was the faction of Sandanski, called Bulgarian section. In this way its activists only "revived" their Bulgarian national identification, as Sandanski's faction advocated the particular interests of the "Bulgarian nationality" in the Empire. On 12 April 1909, a counter-revolution took place in Istanbul and conservative Muslim forces were able to gain control. The Young Turks gathered their forces in Salonica and marched upon the capital. A detachment of 1,200 IMARO revolutionaries took part under the command of Sandanski, Todor Panitsa, and Hristo Chernopeev. The capital was captured by the Young Turks and Abdul Hamid II was deposed from the throne. Afterwards the Young Turk regime grew increasingly militant and nationalist, pursuing restrictive actions against national organizations and political parties, thus relations with the Serres group became more tense. Consequently, it affected the relations within the People's Federative Party too, leading to factionalism largely between Sandanski and Dimitar Vlahov. Namely, Sandanski wanted to end the collaboration with the Young Turks and return to the revolutionary tactics of preparing the population for a pan-Macedonian uprising and creating an independent Macedonian state, while Vlahov favoured further cooperation with the Young Turks, and most of the party members allied with him, which later resulted in the resignation of Sandanski. During this period the rivaling faction's activists of IMARO organised two unsuccessful assassination attempts against Sandanski in September 1908 and in August 1909. They came closest to achieving their goal in the first one conducted on 24 September 1908 in Thessaloniki by Tane Nikolov, who heavily wounded Sandanski and killed two of his comrades.

At the beginning of 1910, Chernopeev, who was the leader of the Strumica district, left politics and moved to Sofia. There, he founded a new organization, the Bulgarian People's Macedonian-Adrianople Revolutionary Organization. Chernopeev also invited Sandanski to join him, however he ignored his invitation. The Bulgarian press took advantage of this and launched a propaganda campaign against Sandanski. He was accused of betraying the Bulgarians in Macedonia, since he did not launch an armed resistance against the Ottoman government. The socialist groups in Bulgaria also criticised him as a collaborator of the Turks. Despite the pressure and critiques, Sandanski continued with his legitimate political activity. In 1910, the CUP launched an operation of general disarmament of the population in Macedonia. Sandanski rejected the attempt, resulting in tension between him and the CUP. In the process of negotiations, Sandanski ensured the CUP that in his region he was responsible for all illegal actions and that it was unnecessary to disarm the population. The CUP accepted his proposition and halted the disarmament of the Christian population in the area. His cooperation with the CUP concluded in early 1912, when on account of the alliance, fellow Sandanists Stoyu Hadzhiev and Aleksandar Buynov were elected to the Ottoman Parliament. Later that year the CUP government resigned.

=== Balkan Wars and aftermath ===
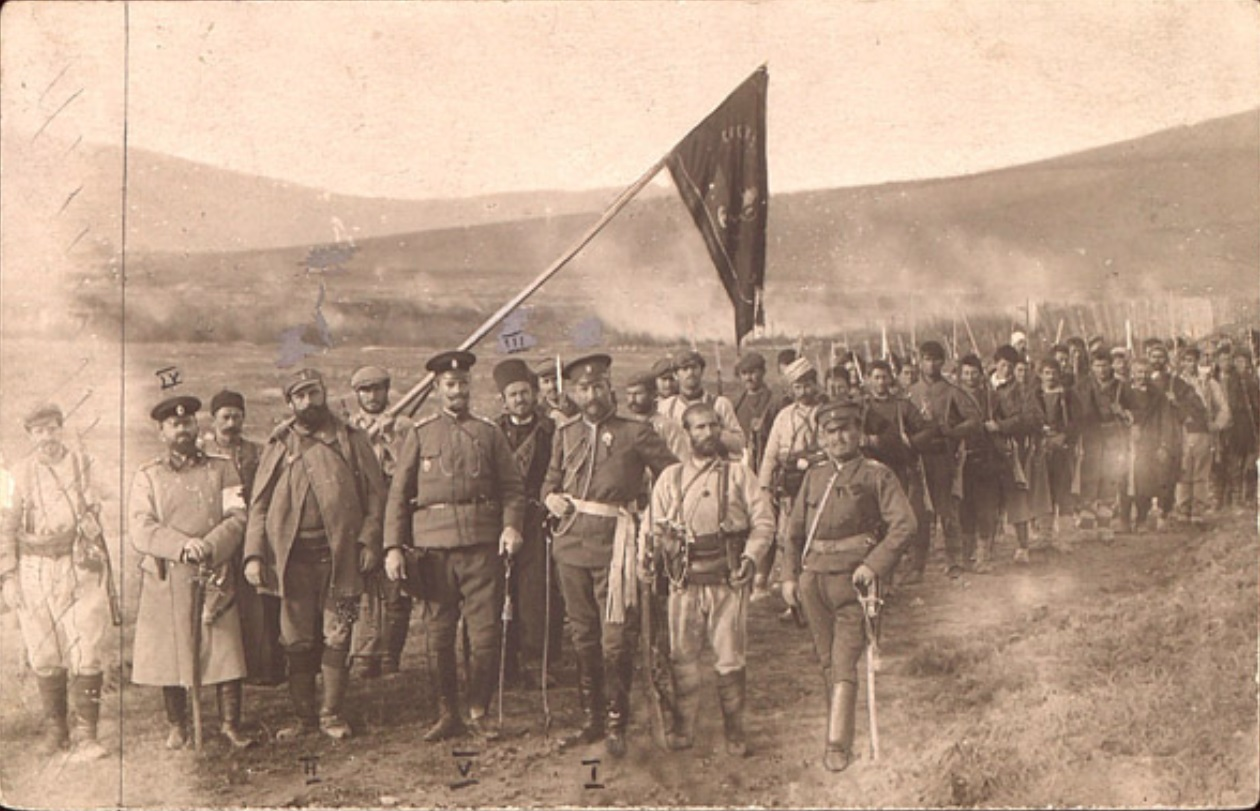
Sandanski (II) with IMARO members supporting Bulgarian troops during Balkan Wars.

Right before the Balkan Wars, Sandanski begun resisting against the Ottomans, as he anticipated that his region of influence was going to be occupied by Bulgaria, so it was sensible to be allied with them in hope of gaining some kind of autonomy or recognition of his rule in the area. He put himself at the service of the Bulgarian army during the Balkan Wars. In the First Balkan War, Sandanski helped the occupying forces with his komitadjis. He had a unit under his control fighting alongside the Bulgarians, but under independent command. It was located at the right flank of the Seventh Rila Division, numbered 2,000 men and was also the unit that captured Melnik. The Macedonian Bulgarian detachments burned Muslim villages and massacred Muslims and within his region, they were treated in the same manner. The Muslim men and women of the village Petrovo were burnt to death and only the children were left alive. Per Mercia MacDermott, Sandanski was not aware about the incident. He usually tried to prevent such massacres on the Muslims. When he learned about this massacre in Petrovo, he gave the children of killed Muslims to the Bulgarian villagers. In June 1913, the Bulgarian government sent a delegation headed by Sandanski to Albania for negotiations with the provisional Albanian government for joint action in the event of a war with Serbia and Greece. He gave an interview for the Italian newspaper "Il Secolo" in Tirana, where he said that he came to an agreement with the Albanians and that revolutionary activity would be renewed.

After the wars, most of Macedonia was ceded to Greece and Serbia, while Pirin Macedonia was ceded to Bulgaria, and the government forbade any influence of Sandanski despite his support for the Bulgarian army previously. Facing with the fact there is no other option than to accept the new conditions, Sandanski started working as a businessman in Pirin Macedonia. On July 1914, the Bulgarian assembly pardoned him for all offences. As result of this, the Macedonian nationalist Dimitrija Čupovski wrote in his newspaper that Sandanski was a Bulgarian agent, bodyguard of the Bulgarian Tsar Ferdinand I and an ordinary criminal. Per the memoirs of his friends, Sandanski continued to be very distrustful of the Bulgarian government and hateful towards Tsar Ferdinand I. He and his IMARO-wing officially supported at that time the Russophiles from the Democratic Party. However, the idea to join the anti-Serbian Central Powers, who fought against Russia, prevailed in Bulgaria, as well as among the rightists in the IMARO. Sandanski attempted to change this course and conspired to assassinate Bulgarian Tsar Ferdinand I. He proposed that Bulgaria be proclaimed as a republic and the foreign policy of the country to be changed. Sandanski sought support among the opposition parties, which were on the side of the Entente, but they refused to participate in the conspiracy, and it failed. As a result, he was assassinated near the Rozhen Monastery on 22 April 1915 while travelling from Melnik to Nevrokop, by local right-wing IMARO faction activists on the order of his archenemy Todor Aleksandrov. He was buried at the monastery. His famous words "To live means to struggle, the slave for freedom and the free man for perfection" are written on his grave.

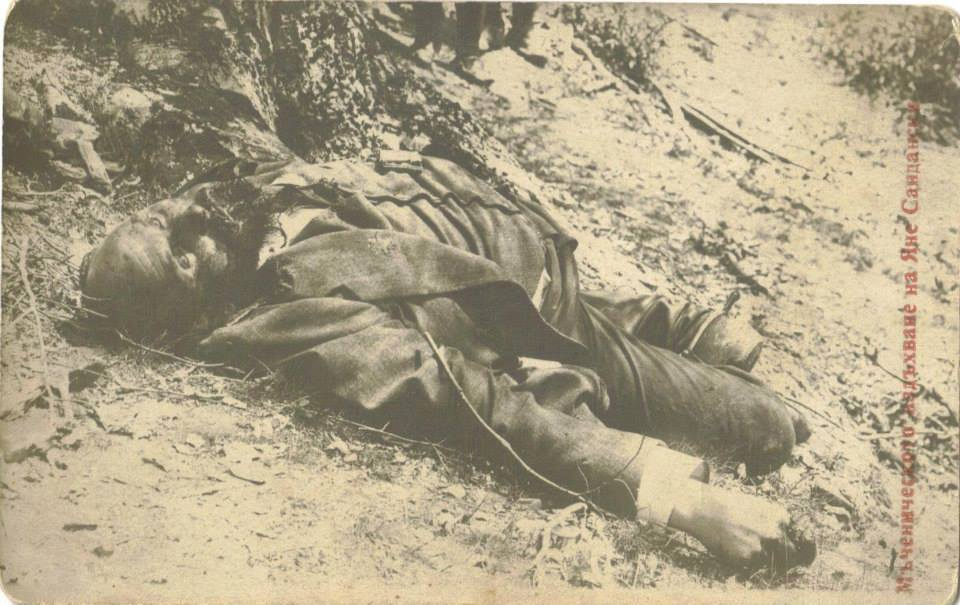
The dead body of Yane Sandanski.

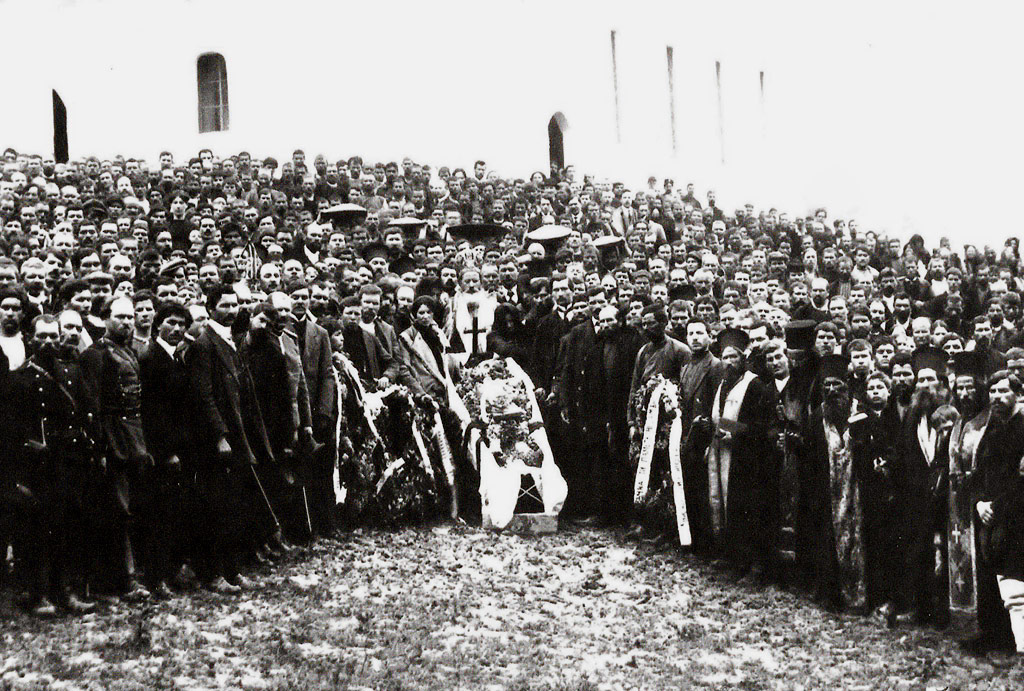
The funeral of Yane Sandanski, his grave is located next to the Rozhen Monastery.

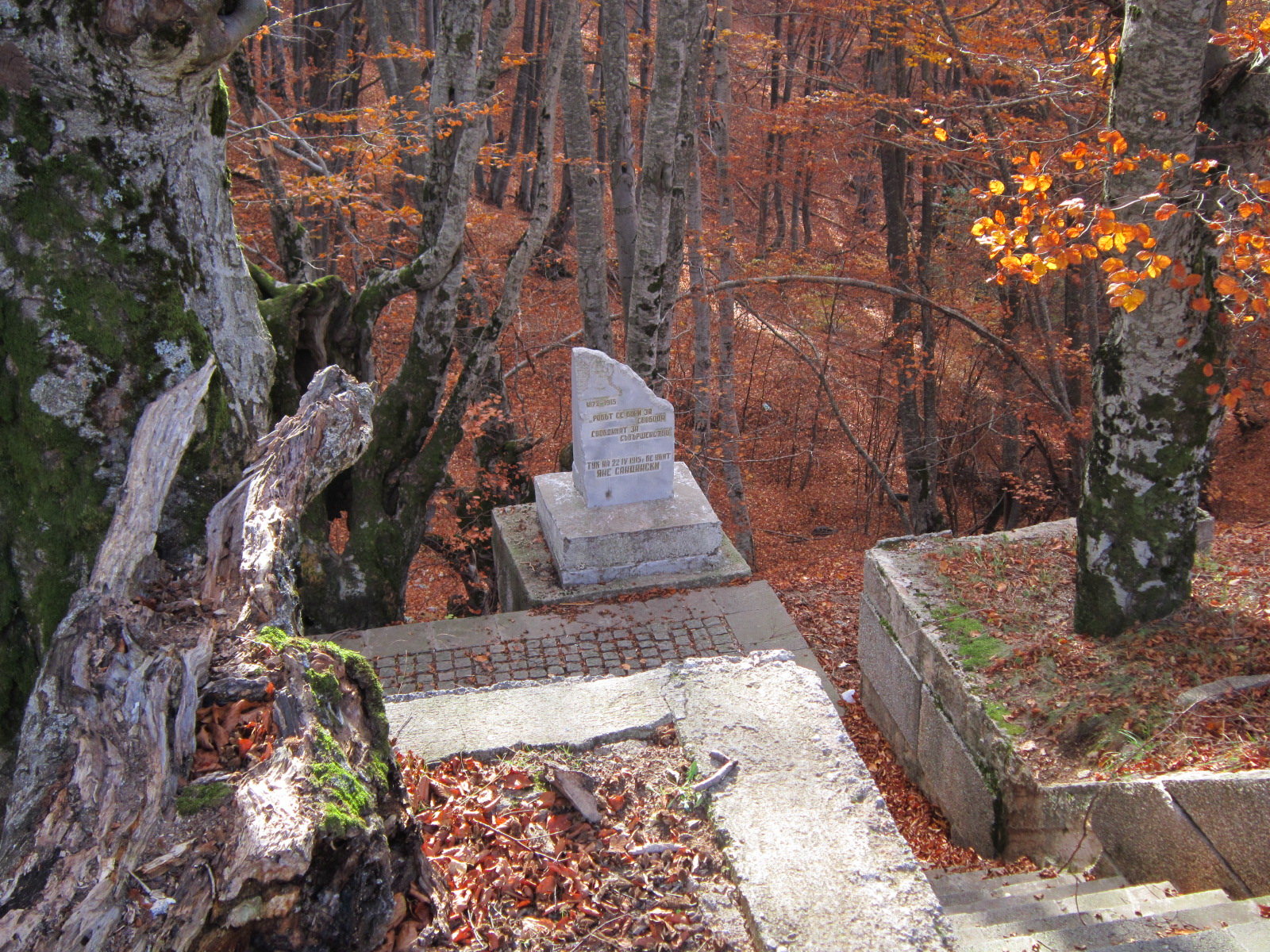
Place of Sandanski's death, near the village of Pirin.

== Views ==
As the leader of the left-wing (federalist) faction, he supported the full political independence of Macedonia and saw the solution of the Macedonian Question through the creation of a Balkan Federation, which would include Macedonia and Adrianople. He welcomed the 1908 Young Turk Revolution, hoping that it would bring equality to all peoples in the Ottoman Empire and political autonomy for Macedonia. Sandanski criticised the politics of both Serbia and Bulgaria and accused them of being more interested in the enlargement of their states than in the freedom of the people in Macedonia. After the Young Turk Revolution, he publicly disowned Bulgarian nationalism. As chairman of the newly established People's Federative Party, he demanded democratisation of the political system, administrative autonomy for the provinces, abolition of national, religious, and social privileges, separation of religious from state affairs, secular education in state schools, and universal conscription. On that basis, the CUP had reached an understanding with his wing. Afterwards, he became disappointed with the Turkish nationalist policy of the new government. Despite rejecting religion, he was deeply superstitious and remained as such throughout his life. He had never rejected the Bulgarian Exarchate as an institution, or denied that it had a role to play in the life of the Macedonian Bulgarians. Per a member of his cheta Atanas Yanev, Sandanski was saddened by internecine struggles. According to Pavel Deliradev, who was one of his closest associates, Sandanski agitated for a fight against the Turkish absolutism and Greater Bulgarian chauvinism and for a free, one, and independent Macedonia in brotherly relations with all free Balkan people.

== Legacy ==
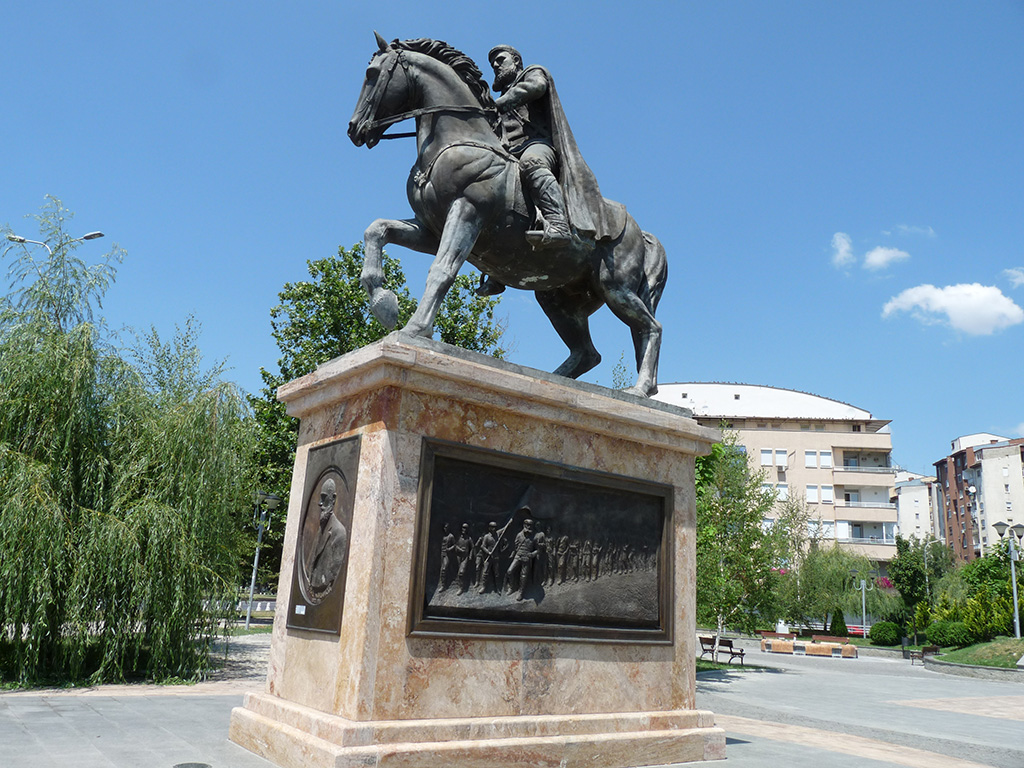
Monument of Sandanski in the suburb named after him in the Aerodrom Municipality of the Macedonian capital, Skopje.

During World War II, the Macedonian Partisans named units after him and other figures, with whom the Communist Party of Yugoslavia and its regional leaders identified themselves with. A partisan detachment, part of the Bulgarian resistance, was named after him on 1 May 1943. Due to indications of a socialist inclination, alongside Delchev, he was among the most glorified IMRO figures in Yugoslav Macedonia and proclaimed as a symbol of the republic. In People's Republic of Bulgaria, the regime appreciated Sandanski because of his socialist ideas and honoured him by renaming the town Sveti Vrach to Sandanski, in 1949. In November 1968, the historical institute of the Bulgarian Academy of Sciences confronted the Yugoslav Macedonian attempt to claim him as an ethnic Macedonian with a monograph. A statue of him was placed in the entrance of Melnik in 1972, where he has been seen as a national hero. In 1981, Bulgarian communist politician Lyudmila Zhivkova listed him and Delchev as among the "national heroes who fought for the freedom of the Bulgarian nation." English historian Mercia MacDermott published a biographical book called For Freedom and Perfection: The Life of Yane Sandansky in 1988. MacDermott admitted that she had a "real battle" over him since he remained a controversial figure even between Bulgarians, and some of the living relatives of Sandanski's enemies were known to be passionately wishful for her blood.

After the fall of communism, nationalist Bulgarian historians have depicted him as a traitor to the Bulgarians, a collaborator of the Turks (seen as Bulgarian enemies) and a robber who was only motivated by money. VMRO-Union of Macedonian Associations' president Stoyan Boyadziev described Sandanski as an extremely controversial Bulgarian revolutionary, whose separatist асtivitу however produced as a whole Macedonian nationalism. Bulgarian president Georgi Parvanov placed a wreath on his monument in Melnik together with his Macedonian counterpart Branko Crvenkovski in March 2008. Parvanov, who is a professional historian, said that earlier he was critical to Sandanski's activities, but from the distance of time, he thinks that Sandanski cannot be reproached for having a self-consciousness different from the Bulgarian one. Sandanski Point on the E coast of Ioannes Paulus II Peninsula, Livingston Island, Antarctica, was named after him by the Bulgarian Antarctic Expedition.

In North Macedonia, Sandanski is considered a national hero. His name is mentioned in the national anthem of North Macedonia, Denes nad Makedonija (Today over Macedonia). A monument commemorating him was placed in Skopje as part of the Skopje 2014 project. A wax figure of Sandanski is in the Museum of the Macedonian Struggle in Skopje. The Macedonian historiography has emphasised the particularity of the IMARO's left-wing and Macedonian historians refer to his actions in an attempt to demonstrate the existence of Macedonian nationalism or at least proto-nationalism within a part of the local revolutionary movement at his time. They also depict him as a fighter against the "Bulgarian aspirations in Macedonia" and the "Turkish yoke". Sandanski's grave has been a place for commemoration and gatherings by Macedonian nationalists, ethnic Macedonians from Bulgaria and North Macedonia. In response, Bulgarian nationalists set up a second gravestone next to the original, inscribing an alleged statement by Sandanski in a Bulgarian patriotic tone.

The identity of Sandanski has been disputed between Bulgaria and North Macedonia. According to the Turkish professor of history Mehmet Hacısalihoğlu, who is interested in nation-building in the late Ottoman Empire, it is very difficult to find a definitive answer to some questions regarding Sandanski's biography. Answering the question "Was Sandanski a betrayer of national Bulgarian interests in Macedonia?", Hacısalihoğlu suggested certainly yes, but also pointed out that the region under his influence was not subject much to the oppressive measures of the CUP government due to his good relations with the CUP. He supported an autonomous Macedonia because it would permit him to expand his role as a political leader and ideology had only a secondary role in his political activities. However, this does not mean, he regarded the Bulgarian Macedonian population as a separate Macedonian nation. Per Bulgarian historian Tchavdar Marinov, during the cooperation with the Young Turks, the internationalist ideas of Bulgarian socialist activists influenced Sandanski's agenda: what was seen as national interests had to be subdued to the pan-Ottoman ones in order to achieve a "supra-national union" of all the nationalities within a reformed Empire. According to him, due to his "anti-Bulgarian" statements, Macedonian historians refer to him and the left-wing to prove the existence of Macedonian nationalism within IMARO, although it is questionable that he strictly espoused Macedonian nationalism. Per historian James Frusetta, during the time of the People's Republic of Bulgaria and Yugoslav Macedonia, the vague left-wing populism and anarcho-socialism espoused by Sandanski, were converted into overt socialism. MacDermott has described him as a Bulgarian revolutionary, who under the influence of socialist ideas, tried to solve the Macedonian Question by uniting all the Balkan peoples.
