= Provisional representation of the former United Internal Revolutionary Organization =

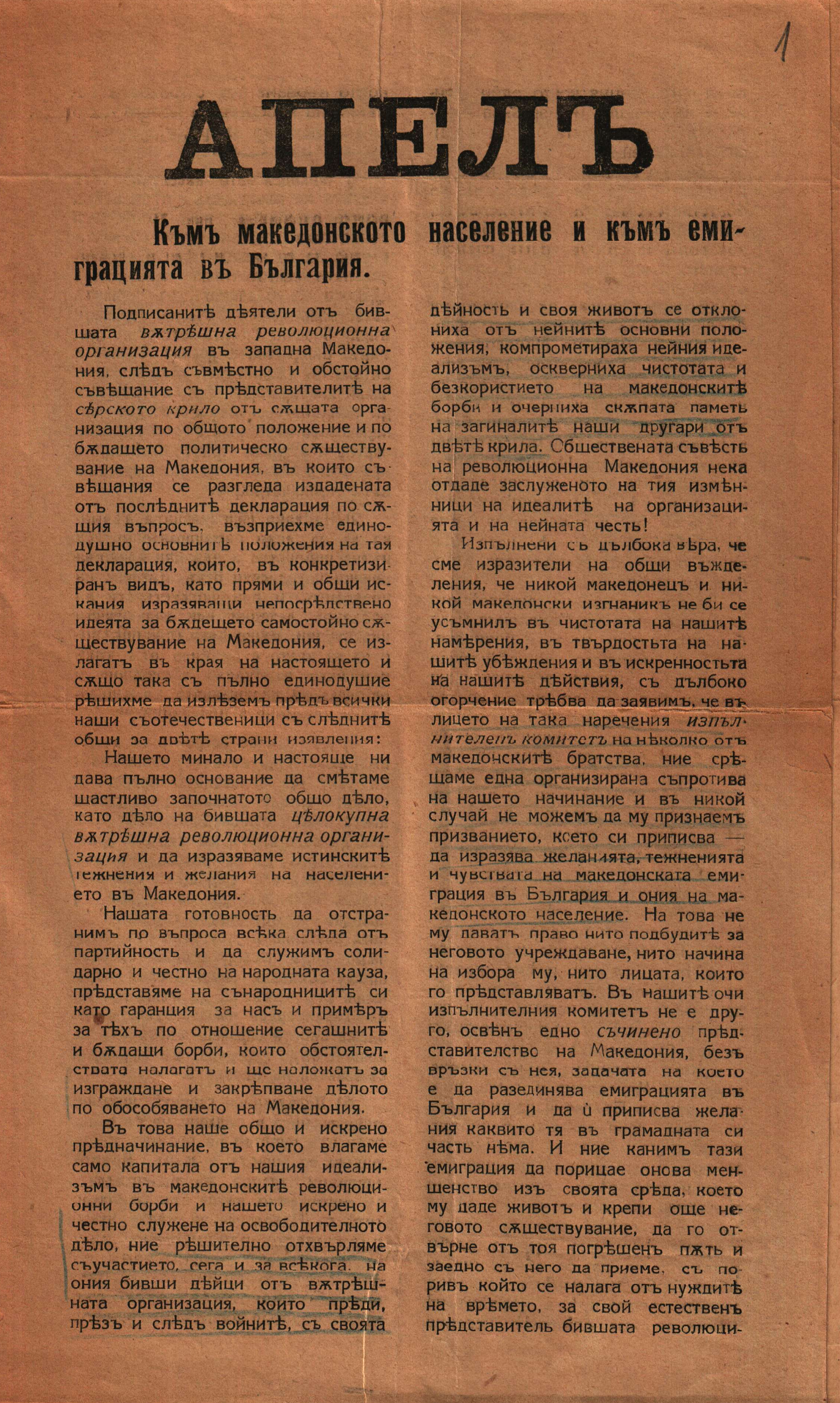
The front page of the Appeal issued by the Organization in March 1919.

The Temporary representation of the former United Internal Revolutionary Organization (Bulgarian:Временно представителство на бившата Обединена Вътрешна Революционна Организация) was a short-lasted organization founded by former members of the Internal Macedonian-Adrianople Revolutionary Organization in 1919 in Sofia, on the wake of the Paris Peace Conference after the World War I. The left-wing of IMARO, disturbed by the organization's increasing domination by the pro-Greater Bulgaria Vrhovists, based on the declaration issued by the Sandanists in 1918, founded this Organization, aimed to avoid the partitition of the region of Macedonia. It included Gyorche Petrov, Dimo Hadzhidimov, Petar Atsev, Hristo Tatartchev, Petar Pop Arsov, Mihail Gerdzhikov, Tushe Deliivanov, Nikola Pushkarov, Rizo Rizov, Anastas Lozanchev, Taskata Spasov-Serski, etc. The Organization issued an "Appeal to the Macedonian population and to the émigré population in Bulgaria" and send it to the representatives of the Great Powers on the Peace conference in Paris. There the Temporary representation advocated for autonomy of Macedonia as a part of a future Balkan Federation. It threatened the autonomous Macedonia as state populated by different people as Bulgarians, Greeks, Serbs, Turks, Vlahs, etc. In the parliamentary and local elections of 1919, the Temporary representation supported the candidates of the Bulgarian Communist Party (BCP). The BCP sought to take the Organization over, in fact to transform it into its own section. Following the signing of the Treaty of Neuilly and the partition of Macedonia, the activity of the Temporary representation faded. In 1920 it was dissolved and most from its members joined the Bulgarian Emigrant Communist Union as part of BCP. Other members joined a number of different leftist organizations such as the Macedonian Federative Organization. They all were opposed to the restoration of IMARO as a Bulgarian nationalist organization under the name IMRO, headed by Todor Alexandrov. Subsequently, most of them were killed in the strife among the Macedonian revolutionaries. At least until the middle of the 1920s, the former IMRO-left was not a united movement, unlike the right wing. In 1925 the most of its survivors joined the Internal Macedonian Revolutionary Organization (United).

== Sources ==
- Гребенаров, Александър, Легални и тайни организации на македонските бежанци в България (1918–1947), МНИ, София, 2006 г.,470 с.
- The Communist party of Bulgaria: origins and development, 1883–1936, Joseph Rothschild, AMS Press, 1972, ISBN 0-404-07164-3, p. 117.
- „Националноосвободителната борба в Македония, 1919 - 1941 г.“, Колектив, Македонски Научен Институт.

== See also ==
- Foreign Representation of the Internal Macedonian Revolutionary Organization
