= Kostadin Alakushev =

Voivode Kostadin Alakushev
- Костадин Алакушев
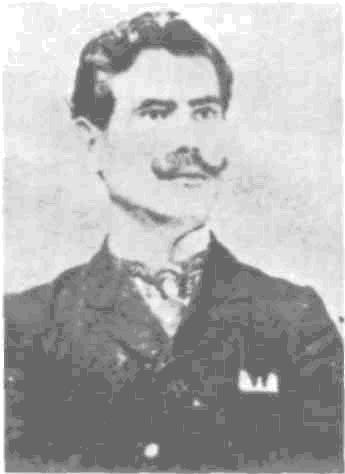
- A portrait of Kostadin Alakushev.
- Born: c. 1875; Tarlis, Salonika Vilayet, Ottoman Empire (now Vathytopos, Greece)
- Died: 1912; Fotovishta, Tsardom of Bulgaria (now Ognyanovo)
- Education: Bulgarian Men's High School of Thessaloniki
- Military career
- Allegiance: IMRO
- Unit: Cheta of Yane Sandanski
- Conflicts: Macedonian Struggle †; Ilinden Uprising
- Other work: One of the founders of the Teachers' Association in Nevrokop; Delegate at the 5th congress of the Union of Bulgarian Teachers

Kostadin Alakushev (Bulgarian and Macedonian: Костадин Алакушев ; c. 1875–1912) was a Macedonian Bulgarian revolutionary of the Internal Macedonian-Adrianople Revolutionary Organization (IMARO).

== Biography ==
Kostadin Alakushev was born in the village of Tarlis, in the Ottoman Empire, that is now in Greece known today as Vathytopos, Kato Nevrokopi municipality, Drama regional unit. He graduated from the Bulgarian Men's High School of Thessaloniki and afterwards worked as a teacher in different villages in the region of Nevrokop and Ser. He became a member of the IMARO and participated in the Ilinden-Preobrazhenie Uprising in the revolutionary band of Stoyan Malchankov. In 1907 he became a member of the regional committee of the IMARO in Nevrokop. In 1909 he was a member of Yane Sandanski's party, whose aim was to protect the Young Turk Revolution. In 1909 he participated in the foundation of a chapter of the People's Federative Party (Bulgarian Section) in Nevrokop. In 1908 Alakushev was among the founders of the Teachers' Association in Nevrokop, in 1911 he became a member of its executive committee and in 1912 he was a delegate at the 5th congress of the Union of Bulgarian Teachers in the Ottoman Empire.

In 1912, Alakushev was kidnapped together with Stoyko Pashkulev and Blagoy Meterov by the rivalling rightist faction of IMARO and killed in the vicinity of the village of Fotovishta (today known as Ognyanovo).
