= Mercia MacDermott =

English writer and historian (1927–2023)

- Born: Mercia Adshead; 7 April 1927; Plymouth, Devon, England
- Died: 28 March 2023 (aged 95); Worthing, West Sussex, England
- Education: St Anne's College, University of Oxford; London School of Slavonic and East European Studies
- Occupations: Historian, educator
- Employers: First English Language School in Sofia; Sofia University
- Spouse: James Macdermott (m. 1948; div. 1964)
- Children: Alexandra MacDermott, D.Phil.
- Parent(s): Geoffrey Palmer Adshead (father); Olive May (née Orme) Adshead (mother)
- Relatives: Samuel Adrian Miles Adshead (brother); Gwen Adshead (niece); Laura Adshead (niece); Thomas Adshead (nephew)

Mercia MacDermott (née Adshead; Bulgarian: Мерсия Макдермот; 7 April 1927 – 28 March 2023) was an English writer and historian. She was known for her books on Bulgarian history.

== Early life ==
Mercia was born on 7 April 1927 in Plymouth, Devon, United Kingdom. Her father was Geoffrey Palmer Adshead, a Royal Navy surgeon captain, and her mother was Olive May (née Orme) Adshead, a teacher. Due to her father's work in the navy, she spent some of her early years in Weihai, China, where Mercia learned Mandarin Chinese. She grew up in Ditchling and later was educated at Westonbirt School, Gloucestershire and St Anne's College, Oxford University where she read Russian Literature. In the summer of 1947, while participating in a youth brigade in Yugoslavia with other English students, she first met with Bulgarians, among whom was the poet Pavel Matev.

In 1948, she graduated with an MA degree from Oxford and visited Bulgaria to participate in the international youth brigade building the Koprinka Reservoir. As a foreign udarnik, Mercia was invited along with other international participants to meet Georgi Dimitrov in the Euxinograd palace on the Bulgarian Black Sea Coast. While working at the Koprinka reservoir, Mercia met her future husband James MacDermott. Returning to the United Kingdom in 1948, MacDermott enrolled in a Bulgarian language course at the University of London's School of Slavonic and East European Studies.

== Career ==
Mercia MacDermott visited and lived in Bulgaria from 1957 to 1989. From 1963 to 1964 and from 1973 to 1979 she was a teacher at the English Language High School in Sofia. MacDermott subsequently lectured on the Bulgarian national liberation movement in the region of Macedonia at Sofia University's Faculty of History. She was elected a foreign member of the Bulgarian Academy of Sciences in 1987. In 2007, Sofia University awarded her an Honorary Doctorate.

MacDermott's activity is described by Waller, Diane in Allcock, John B.; Young, Antonia, eds. (2000). "Mercia MacDermott: A Woman of the Frontier". Black Lambs and Grey Falcons (2nd ed.). Oxford: Berghahn Books. pp. 166–186 – via Internet Archive.

== Positions and awards ==
From 1958 to 1973, Mercia MacDermott was the chairwoman of the London-based British–Bulgarian Friendship Society. An honorary citizen of Karlovo and Blagoevgrad, she was also the bearer of a number of Bulgarian state decorations.

== Personal life and death ==
The MacDermotts divorced in 1964. Their daughter Alexandra (born 1952) has been a professor in physical chemistry at the University of Houston-Clear Lake in Texas. Mercia's brother, Samuel Adrian Miles Adshead (1932–2009), was a distinguished sinologist and former professor of history at the University of Canterbury in New Zealand.

MacDermott died on 28 March 2023, at the age of 95.

== Bibliography ==
- A History of Bulgaria 1393–1885. London: Allen and Unwin. 1962 – via Internet Archive. OCLC 279468
- The Apostle of Freedom: A portrait of Vasil Levski against a background of nineteenth-century Bulgaria. London: Allen and Unwin. 1967. OCLC 957800 – via internet Archive.
- Freedom or Death (the life of Gotsé Delchev), Journeyman Press, 1978, ISBN 978-0-904526-32-5
- For Freedom and Perfection (the life of Yané Sandansky), Journeyman Press, 1988, ISBN 978-1-85172-014-9
- Bulgarian Folk Customs. London and Philadelphia: Jessica Kingsley Publishers. 1998. ISBN 978-1-85302-486-3 – via Internet Archive.
- Explore Green Men, Heart of Albion Press, 2006, ISBN 978-1-872883-94-6
- Lone red poppy, Manifesto Press, 2014, ISBN 978-1-907464-10-2
- Once upon a time in Bulgaria, Manifesto Press, 2016, ISBN 978-1-907464-16-4
