= Hristo Chernopeev =

Voivode Hristo Chernopeev
- Христо Чернопеев
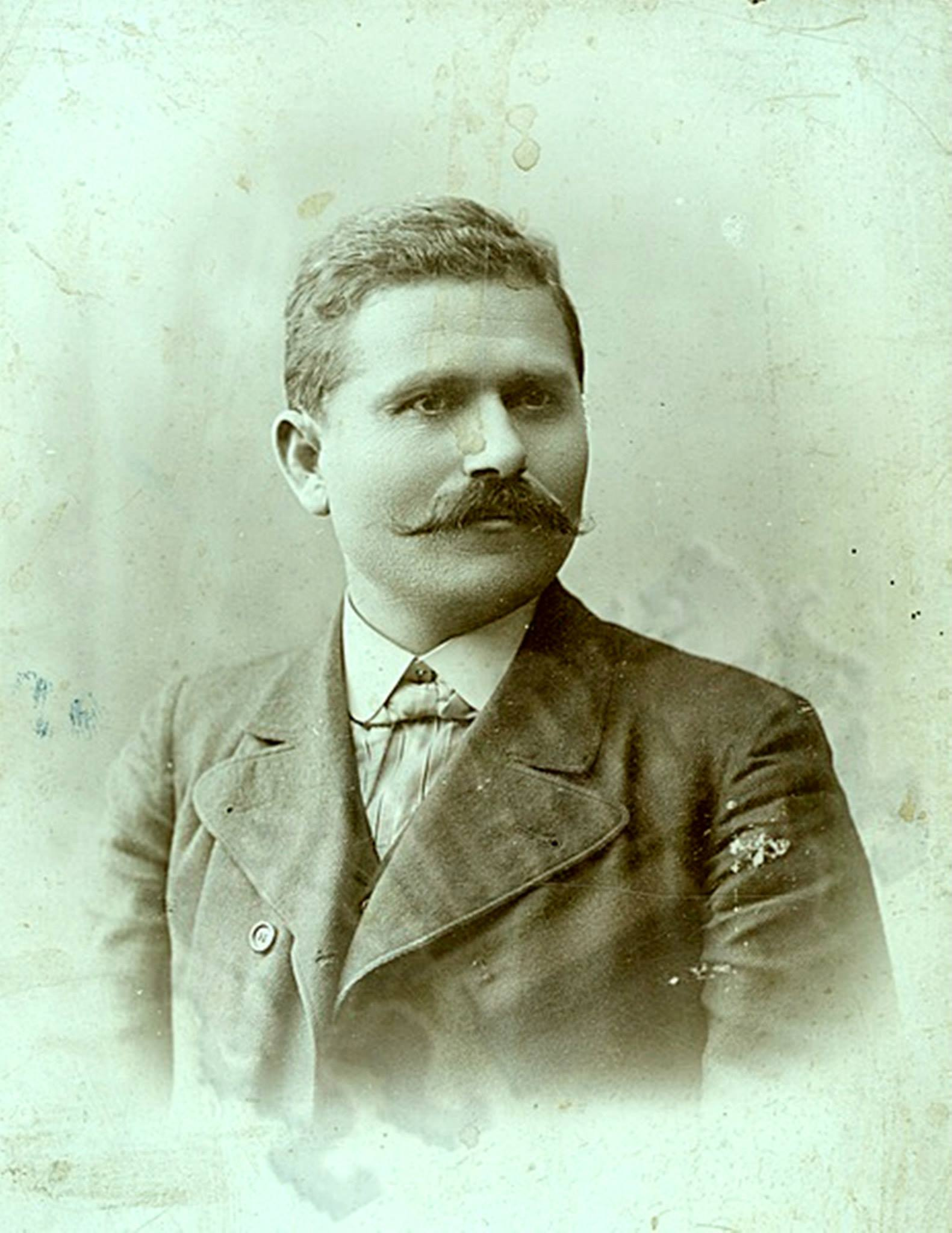
- A portrait of Hristo Chernopeev by Dimitar Karastoyanov.
- Born: c. 1868; Dermantsi, Danube Vilayet, Ottoman Empire (now Bulgaria)
- Died: 6 November 1915 (aged 46–47); Krivolak, Kingdom of Serbia (now North Macedonia)
- Burial place: Novo Selo (exhumed)
- Military career
- Allegiance: Principality of Bulgaria; Tsardom of Bulgaria
- Branch: Bulgarian Army; IMRO
- Conflicts: Ilinden Uprising; Macedonian Struggle; Balkan Wars; First Balkan War; Bulgarian front; Second Balkan War; World War I; Macedonian front; Battle of Krivolak †
- Other work: Involved in the Miss Stone Affair; One of the founders of the People's Federative Party (Bulgarian Section)

Hristo Chernopeev (Bulgarian: Христо Чернопеев) (c. 1868, Dermantsi – 6 November 1915, Krivolak) was a Bulgarian Army officer and member of the revolutionary movement in Macedonia. He was among the leaders of the Bulgarian People's Macedonian-Adrianople Revolutionary Organization.

== Biography ==
Chernopeev worked as sergeant in the Bulgarian Army from 1889 to 1899. Afterwards he became an active member of the Macedonian liberation movement and took part in the Miss Stone Affair in 1901 in Pirin Mountain. After the suppression of the Ilinden-Preobrazhenie Uprising in 1903 together with Yane Sandanski and Dimo Hadjidimov, he set the base of the left wing of IMRO. During this period he led a band in Kilkis' region and worked as a military instructor in IMRO. After the Young Turks revolution in 1908, Chernopeev was one of the founders of the People's Federative Party (Bulgarian Section). From 1911, he became member of the Central Committee of IMRO. During 1912, he was the leader of a volunteer regiment in the First Balkan War. In 1913, Chernopeev was elected as deputy in the Bulgarian parliament. During the First World War in 1915, he left the parliament and went at the front as a reserve officer. Chernopeev was killed on 6 November 1915 in the battle of Krivolak with French troops. He was buried in the courtyard of the church in Novo Selo, now a quarter of Štip.

After the communists seized power in Yugoslavia in 1945, the nameplate on his grave was destroyed.

In November 2010 his mortal remains and the remains of ten other Bulgarian officers were еxhumed for unknown circumstances. Later, the authorities in North Macedonia obliterated the graves and a playground was built in their place.

== Legacy ==
Chernopeev Peak on Trinity Peninsula in Antarctica is named after Hristo Chernopeev.
