= Foreign Representation of the Internal Macedonian Revolutionary Organization =

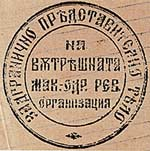
The stamp of the Foreign Representation.

The Foreign Representation was an organizational institution of the Internal Macedonian Revolutionary Organization (IMRO). It was established in Ottoman Thessaloniki at the Congress of the IMRO in 1896 but was set up in Sofia in 1897. Its aim was to keep in touch the Central Committee in Thessaloniki with the foreign representatives in Sofia, through who to inform the Bulgarian authorities about the situation in the region of Macedonia and Adrianople Thrace. Gotse Delchev and Dame Gruev, two of the most significant figures in the organization, both served as key members of this Sofia-based representation. The office was responsible to build and manage the illegal border crossings from Bulgaria to the Ottoman Empire for the transfer of weapons, munitions, money and literature. Its task was also to maintain contacts with the Supreme Macedonian Committee and with the Bulgarian society, and to seek support for the Liberation movement. In addition to this activity, the foreign representatives were obliged to maintain contacts with the diplomatic representatives in Bulgaria and to inform them about the situation in Macedonia and Adrianople areas. This Institution was set up in Sofia, and acted in parallel with the Central Committee until 1924. The representatives were appointed by the CC. This institution was closed at the IMRO Congress in Simitli in 1928.

== See also ==
- Provisional representation of the former United Internal Revolutionary Organization
