= Kostadin Varimezov =

Bulgarian bagpiper

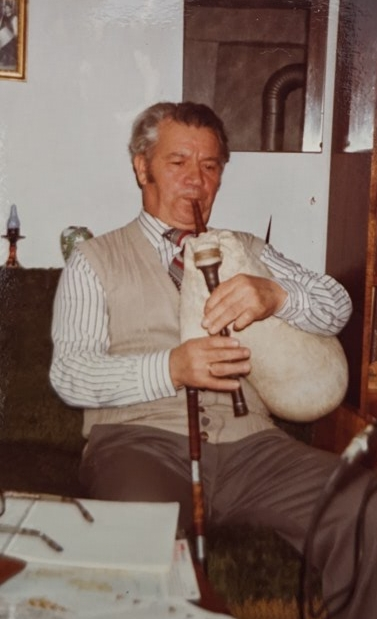
Kostadin Varimezov playing the gaida (Bulgarian bagpipe)

Kostadin Varimezov (Bulgarian: Костадин Варимезов) (1918–2002) was among the best-known Bulgarian bagpipers (gaidari). He was born in the village of Rosenovo, Burgas Province. In 1954, he was appointed to the Folk Song Ensemble of Radio Bulgaria. He retired from the ensemble in 1978, and with his wife Todora, established a rural residence where they entertained friends and family with music as a central feature. He toured with the band Balkana, composed of the singers of Trio Bulgarka and several other musicians, in more than 30 countries.
