= Dimo Hadzhidimov =

Bulgarian teacher, politician, and revolutionary

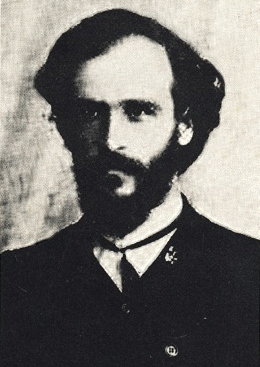
- Hadzhidimov, c. 1908
- Born: 19 February 1875; Gorno Brodi, Salonica Vilayet, Ottoman Empire
- Died: 13 September 1924 (aged 49); Sofia, Bulgaria
- Occupations: Educator; Politician
- Organization: Internal Macedonian Revolutionary Organization
- Political party: People's Federative Party (Bulgarian Section); Bulgarian Communist Party

Dimo Hadzhidimov or Dimo Hadži Dimov (Bulgarian: Димо Хаджидимов, Macedonian: Димо Хаџи Димов; 19 February 1875 – 13 September 1924) was a Macedonian Bulgarian teacher, revolutionary and politician who was among the leaders and main ideologist of the left wing of the Internal Macedonian Revolutionary Organization (IMRO). He was also member of the Bulgarian Workers' Social Democratic Party, and later the Bulgarian Communist Party, from which he became a deputy in the Bulgarian Parliament.

== Life ==
Dimo Hadzhidimov was born on 19 February 1875 in Gorno Brodi, Ottoman Empire (now Ano Vrontou, Serres regional unit, Greece). His father Dimko had led the national movement for the religious rights of Bulgarians there for 25 years. After the failure of the Kresna-Razlog Uprising in 1879, the family moved to Dupnitsa in the Principality of Bulgaria in 1880. The family had a good economic status until the move to Bulgaria, where they experienced a downward economic spiral like other refugee families during that period. Due to this, Hadzhidimov came under the influence of socialist ideas early on. He studied pedagogy from 1891 until 1894 in Kyustendil. While he was studying in Kyustendil, he became familiar with the works of German left-wingers Clara Zetkin and August Bebel. From 1894, he began spreading socialist views among Macedonian activists in Bulgaria. Hadzhidimov had also cooperated with the Bulgarian foreign ministry briefly. In 1895, together with Vasil Glavinov, he started publishing a short-lived newspaper Revolution (Bulgarian: Революция), consisting of 10 issues, in Sofia. He studied law at Sofia University in 1898, but was expelled due to his political views. Hadzhidimov later became a member of the Macedonian-Adrianople Social Democratic Group and of IMRO. During this period he worked as a teacher in the Bulgarian schools in Dupnitsa and later in Samokov. He became a member of the Bulgarian Workers' Social Democratic Party in 1901.

In May 1903 Hadzhidimov arrived in the village of Banitsa for a meeting with Gotse Delchev, after which the skirmish with Ottoman troops happened in which Delchev got killed, while Hadzhidimov managed to escape with other komitadjis. Later that year he participated in the Ilinden-Preobrazhenie Uprising. After the uprising, he suggested decentralizing IMARO into a federation of revolutionary districts, each running its own affairs. This program influenced Yane Sandanski and was featured in IMRO's Rila congress in October 1905, which appointed him as editor-in-chief of the newspaper Revolutionary Sheet. The following years he was involved with the Serres group of Sandanski and became the main ideologist of the left-wing (federalist) faction of IMRO. Their main goal was Macedonian autonomy evolving in a full political independence and later joining a future Balkan Federation as a separate polity, which would assure freedom and equality of its nationalities by the example of Switzerland. The federalists were firmly hostile towards the idea of Greater Bulgaria and the "national unification." In an article from 1904 in the newspaper Revolutionary Sheet, which was the unofficial organ of the Serres group, Hadzhidimov stated that each of the small neighbor states has militant aspirations towards Macedonia and Adrianople region but IMRO was opposed to them with its motto: Macedonia and the Adrianopole area to the Macedonians and Adranopolitans. After the Young Turk Revolution in 1908, he returned to Ottoman Macedonia and became a member of the People's Federative Party (Bulgarian Section). From August 1908 until January 1909, Hadzhidimov and Pere Toshev redacted the newspaper Konstitutsionna Zarya (Constitutional Reveille), which was the organ of Sandanski's Serres group, and was issued in Turkish, French and Bulgarian in Thessaloniki.

After 1909, he joined the Bulgarian Social Democratic Workers' Party (Narrow Socialists). During the Balkan Wars, Hadzhidimov was a Bulgarian sergeant. He was captured in Thessaloniki during the Second Balkan War and was exiled by the Greek authorities to the island of Paleo Trikeri. During the First World War, he served as a non-combatant. After the First World War, in 1918, on his initiative, the Serres group issued the Serres Declaration in which they sought restoration of Macedonia in its geographical boundaries within a Balkan Federation. The same aims applied to the Provisional representation of the former United Internal Revolutionary Organization, of which Hadzhidimov was among the founders in 1919. The same year he published his brochure called Back To Autonomy, in which he considered IMRO as Bulgarian in respect of its members and the idea of autonomy was launched by the "Bulgarian element" in Macedonia. Furthermore, he was assured that Macedonian Bulgarians should exist politically outside Bulgaria, jointly with the other Macedonian "nationalities", a view which stimulated an increasingly "Macedonian" identity. He also criticized the Macedonians in Bulgaria and their leaders who sabotaged the idea of a Balkan Federation with Macedonia as its focal point. In 1919, he joined the Bulgarian Communist Party (BCP) and was elected as a deputy in the Bulgarian Parliament as a member of the party in 1923. In 1924 he joined BCP's Central Committee. Hadzhidimov was chosen as the first secretary and editor-in-chief of the official newspaper Liberation by BCP. After the murder of IMRO leader Todor Aleksandrov there were series of assassinations conducted as a revenge against left-wing activists, thus Hadzidimov was assassinated by the right-wing IMRO activist Vlado Chernozemski in Sofia on 13 September 1924. His surname was given to Zhostovo village (now a town since 1996) in Blagoevgrad Province in 1951; It was renamed as Hadzhidimovo.

== Views ==
For him, Macedonia's liberation was the first objective to be achieved for social transformation and believed that economic slavery could be abolished after the achievement of national political freedom. He stated that struggles for political freedom must be aligned with efforts to raise the political and revolutionary consciousness among the people. Hadzhidimov also thought that Bulgaria's big military spendings exhausted its resources. He did not believe that the state could solve the national questions of the people in the Balkans. As a result, he had a critical view of the national states in the Balkans, but mostly Bulgaria. He considered the Bulgarian foreign policy as inconsistent and weak, and blamed the country for excessively depending on the Great Powers. He believed that Macedonia's autonomy would not satisfy Bulgaria as the interests of the merchants, the factory owners and the landowners would result in its incorporation into the country. For him, the Greater Bulgaria of the San Stefano treaty was unrealistic because no country would support it. He also had advocated for regional self-government in the Ottoman Empire, specifically self-government for districts.

From 1900, Hadzhidimov opposed the partition of the Macedonian region between the countries of the Balkans due to the region's mixed population, suggesting the establishment of an independent and autonomous state instead. He maintained that the slogan Macedonia for the Macedonians should be a strong principle. In 1904, he imagined Macedonia as an independent entity to be incorporated into a future Balkan Federation, including all communities in the region. He proposed a federative-republican government. Hadzhidimov came up with the principles of revolution and people's self-governance, which became pillars of IMRO's left-wing political program. He associated the former principle with the idea of fighting the "national chauvinism, religious fanaticism and the nationalist propagandas". The principle of self-governance was seen as guaranteeing equality before the law as well as the religious, national, political and economic freedom of the people. Hadzhidimov believed that revolutionary organizations, not individuals, shape social movements and include all Balkan representatives. In his writings, he often described Macedonia as his homeland, IMRO as a "Macedonian organization" and the followers as "Macedonians". However, in 1906, he stated that the Bulgarians are dominant numerically in the Macedonian region and thought that they could lose their national consciousness only through extinction. After the Young Turk Revolution, he identified himself as one of the "Bulgarians in the Empire", repeatedly insisting on the term "Macedonian Bulgarians" for self-identification.

== Gallery ==
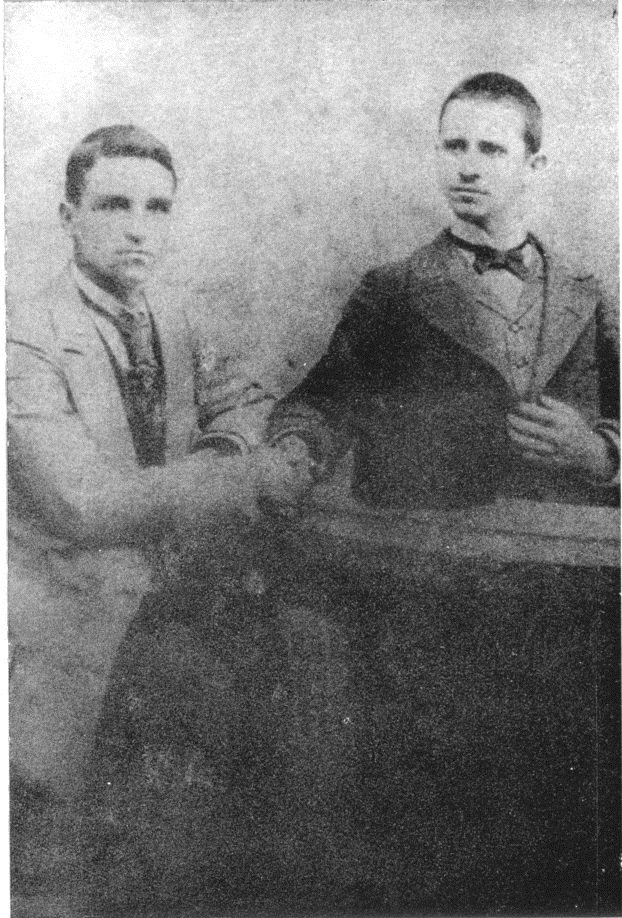
Hadzhidimov (left) as a student in the Kyustendil Pedagogical School in 1892

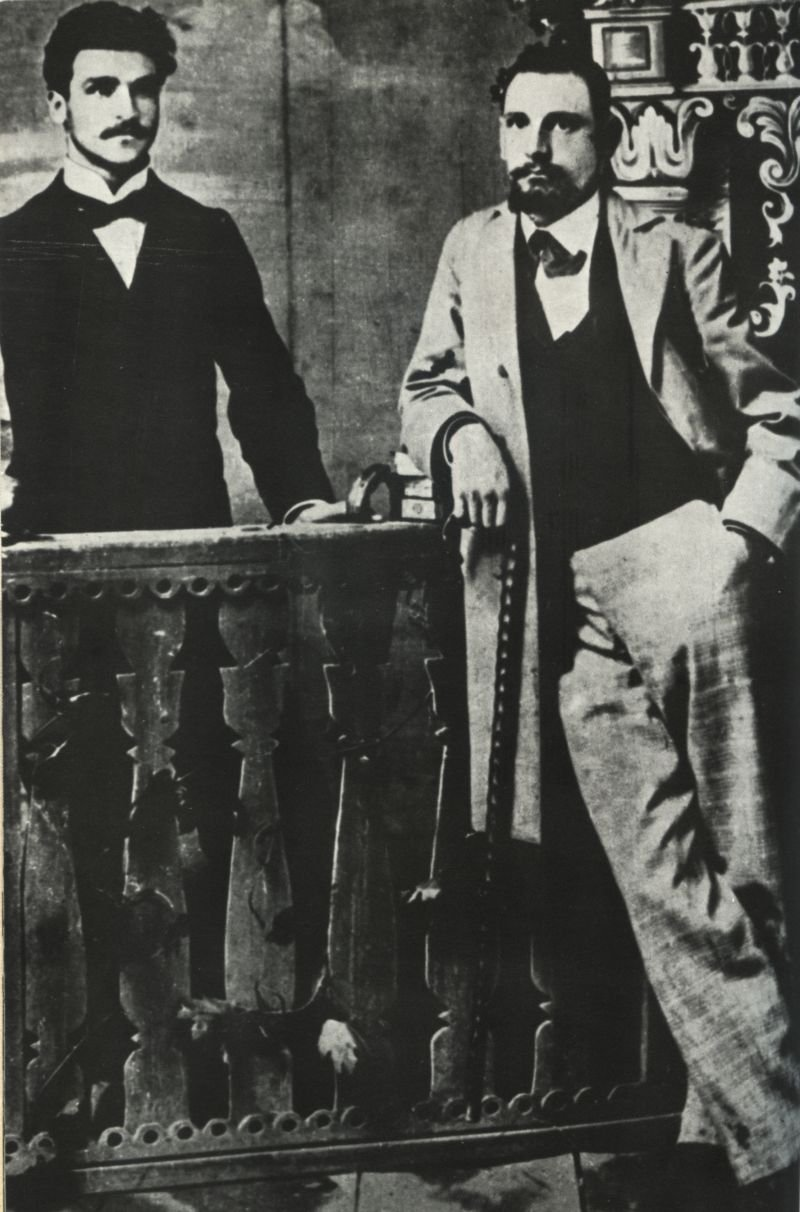
Hadzhidimov with Yane Sandanski

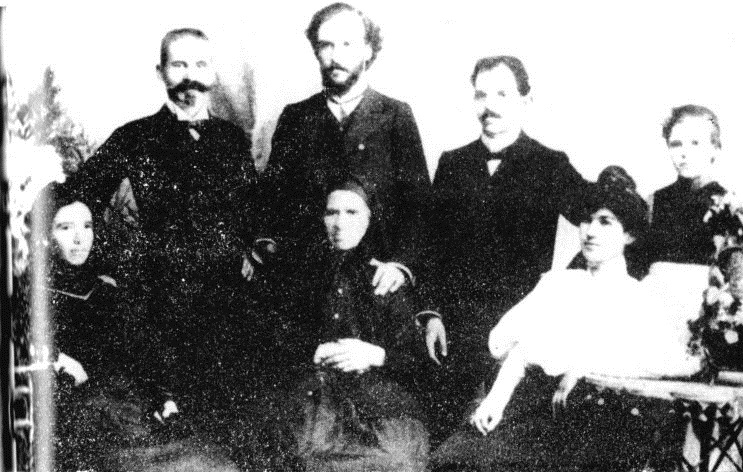
Hadzhidimov with his family c. 1900

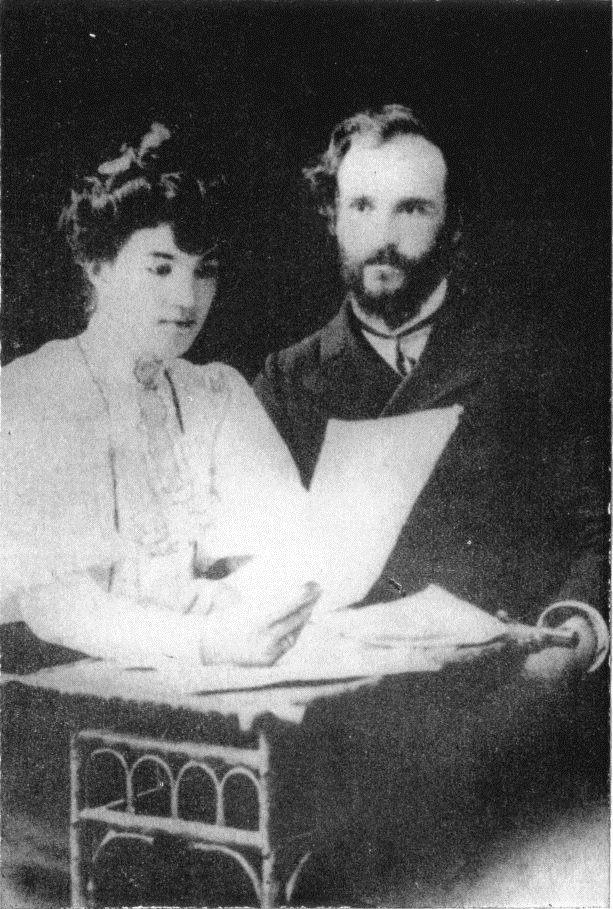
Hadzhidimov and his wife Alexandra in 1905

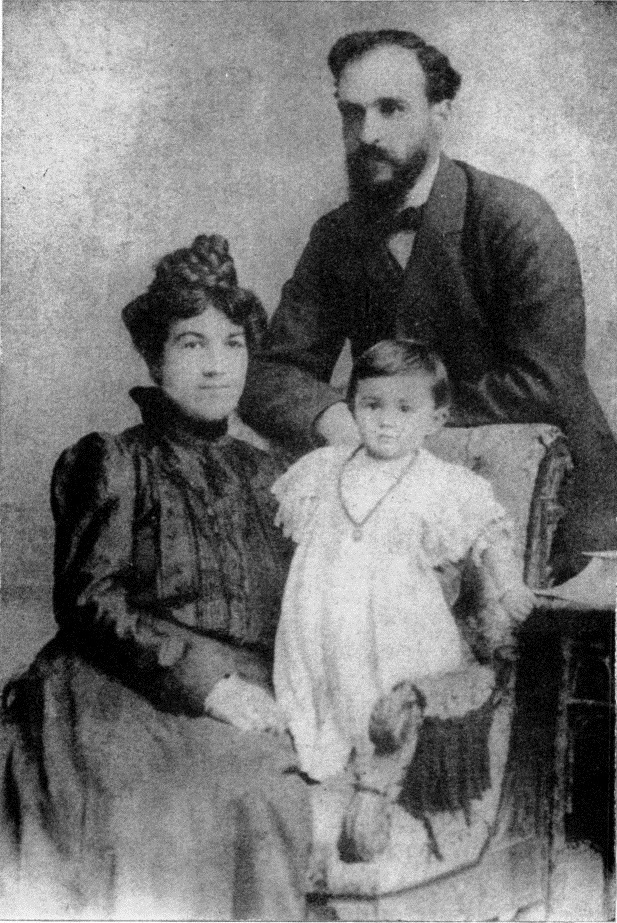
Hadzhidimov with his wife and daughter c. 1907

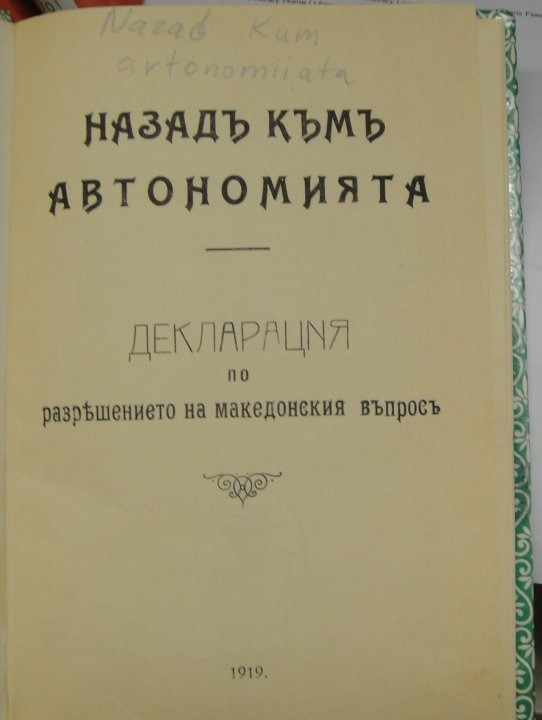
Front page of the "Back to Autonomy" brochure

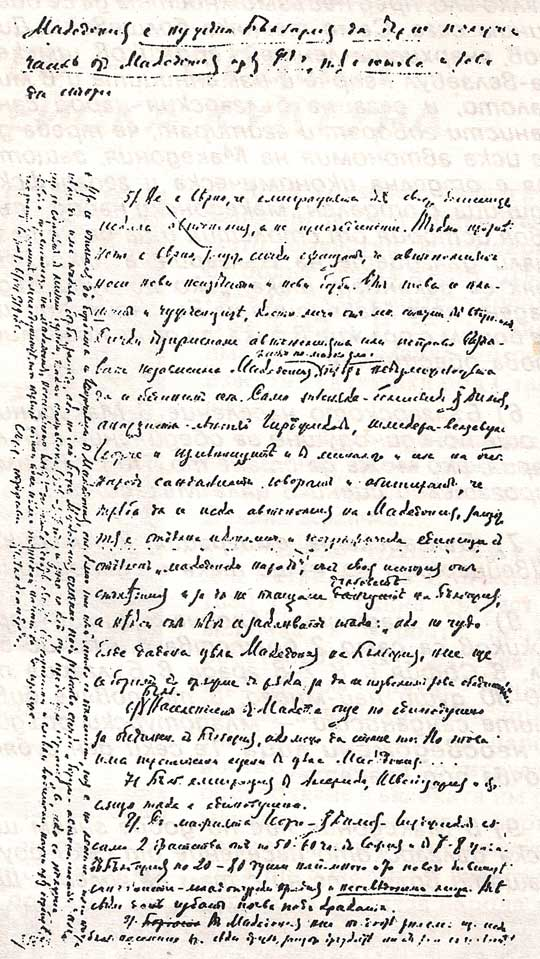
Letter from Aleksandrov in which he accuses Hadzhidimov as a traitor of Bulgarian people because of his separatist ideas. (Note: "Only the narrow-minded bolshevik Hadzhidimov, the lazy anarchist Gerdzhikov, the scheming-beelzebub Gyorche and the traitors of the Bulgarian people, both in the past and now, the Sandanists, speak and agitate that autonomy should be demanded for Macedonia, because it is a separate economic and geographical unit with a separate "Macedonian people", with its own history spanning centuries, and so that they would not have to pay Bulgaria's debts, and some of them threaten as follows: "If by some miracle all of Macedonia is given to Bulgaria, we will fight with arms in hand to prevent this unification.")

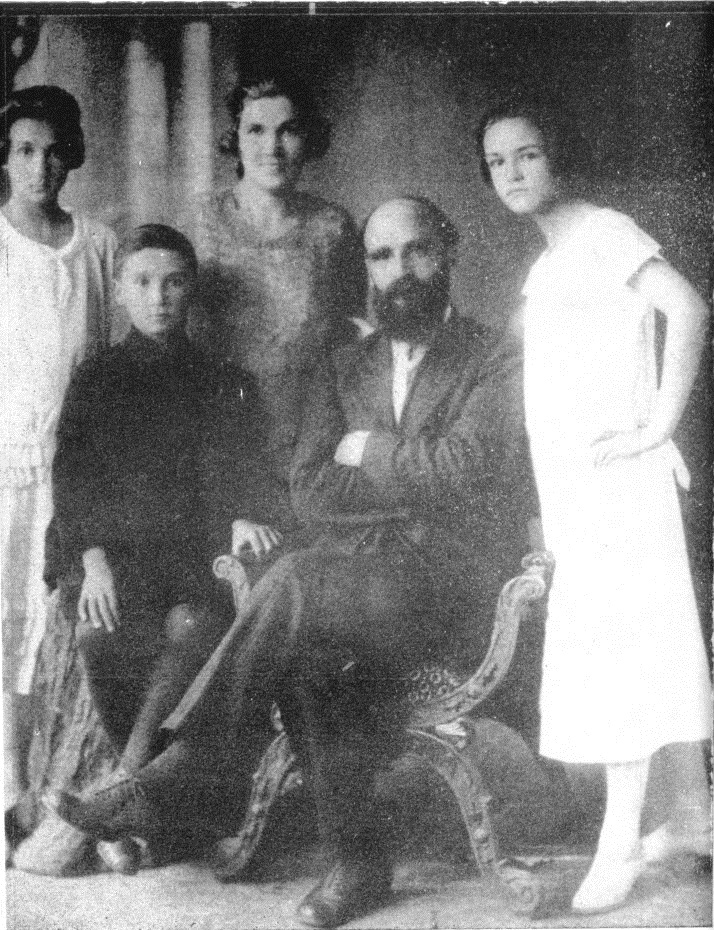
Dimo Hadzhidimov with his family three days prior to his death in 1924
