= Bulgarian People's Macedonian-Adrianople Revolutionary Organization =

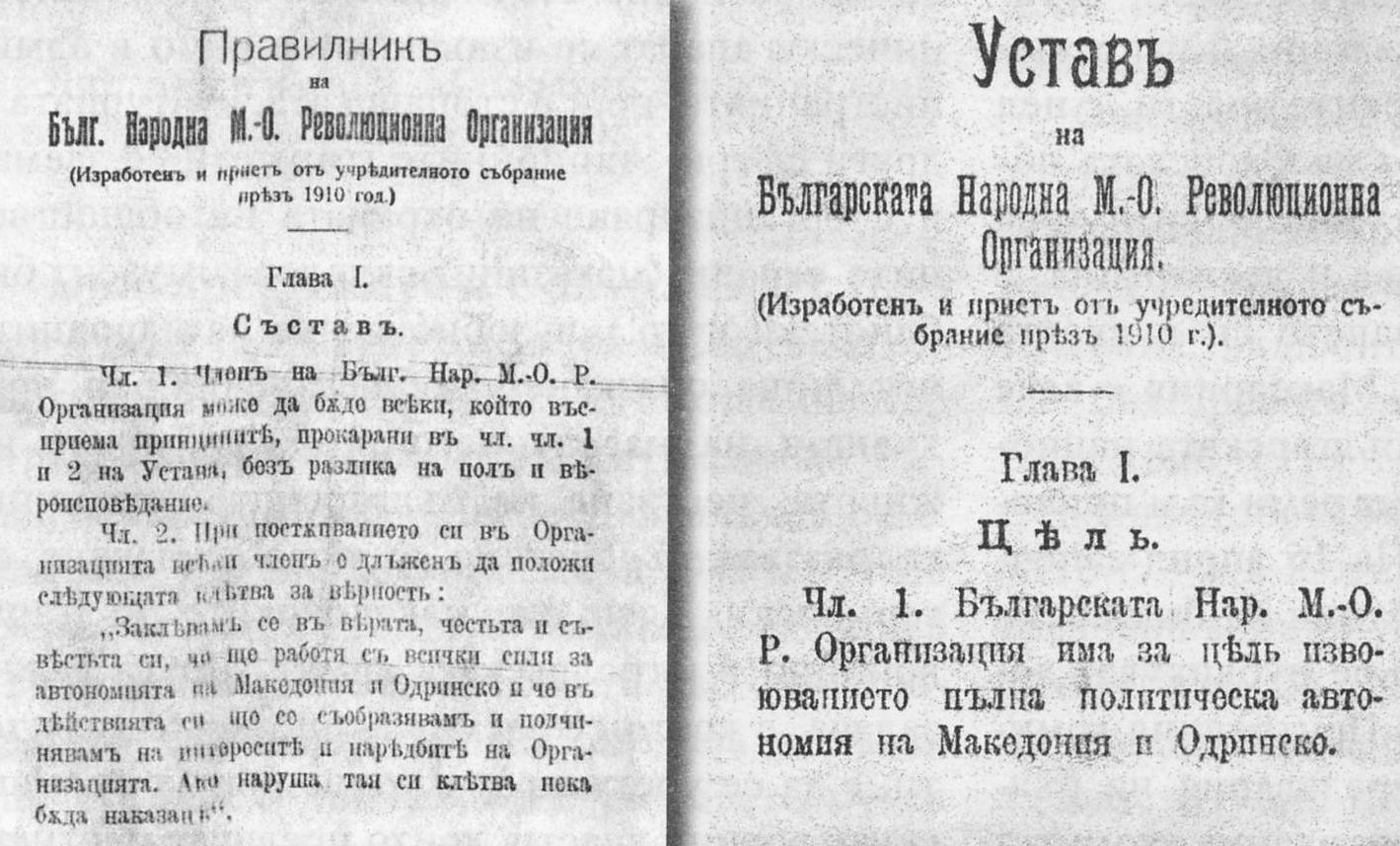
Statute and regulations of the BNMORO

The Bulgarian People's Macedonian-Adrianople Revolutionary Organization (Bulgarian: Българска народна македоно-одринска революционна организация) was a short-lived Bulgarian revolutionary organization from the region of Macedonia. It was created on May 4, 1910 by members of Secret Macedonian-Adrianople Revolutionary Organization's (SMARO) Solun, Strumica and Ser revolutionary regions, excluding the supporters of Yane Sandanski. A statute and a central committee, led by Hristo Chernopeev and Anton Bozukov, were created shortly after. Some of the other more renowned members of the organization were Tane Nikolov, Apostol Petkov, Georgi Zankov and Dimitar Lyapov. After negotiations in Sofia in 1911, BPMARO united with SMARO.

== See also ==
- Internal Macedonian Revolutionary Organisation
