= Andon Dimitrov =

Macedonian Bulgarian revolutionary (1867–1933)

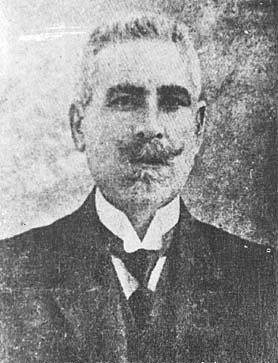
- Born: 1867; Ayvatovo, Ottoman Empire
- Died: 13 March 1933 (aged 65–66); Sofia, Bulgaria
- Citizenship: Ottoman/Bulgarian
- Occupations: Teacher, lawyer and judge

Andon (Anton) Dimitrov (Bulgarian and Macedonian: Андон (Антон) Димитров; 1867 – 13 March 1933) was a Macedonian Bulgarian revolutionary, teacher, and lawyer. He was among the founders of the Internal Macedonian Revolutionary Organization (IMRO).

== Biography ==
Dimitrov was born in 1867 in the village of Ayvatovo (now a part of the municipality of Mygdonia, Greece), at the time in the Ottoman Empire. He graduated from the Bulgarian Men's High School of Thessaloniki in 1889. He returned to Thessaloniki, teaching Turkish at the gymnasium he once attended himself. On 23 October 1893, Dimitrov, together with Hristo Tatarchev, Dame Gruev, Ivan Hadzhinikolov, Petar Poparsov and Hristo Batandzhiev founded what is commonly known as the Internal Macedonian Revolutionary Organization (IMRO). He was a member of the Central Committee from 1894 to 1896, as well as a participant in the Thessaloniki Congress of IMRO in 1896. From 1897 to 1899, he was a teacher in Bitola. Afterwards, he studied law in Istanbul and Liege in Belgium until 1903. Later he worked as a lawyer in Prilep and Bitola. After the Young Turk Revolution, he worked as a judge in Istanbul.

He participated in the creation of the Bulgarian Constitutional Clubs. After the Balkan Wars, he emigrated to Bulgaria in 1913. In Sofia, he was active among the Macedonian emigration. Dimitrov started to work in the Ministry of Justice, and later in the Ministry of Foreign Affairs and Religious Denominations. Dimitrov was one of the founders of the Temporary Commission of the Macedonian Brotherhoods in Bulgaria, which was the predecessor of the Macedonian Federative Organization (MFO). However, Dimitrov did not participate in the MFO because of the growing tensions and hostility with the right-wing IMRO. Later, he taught Turkish at the Bulgarian Commerce school in Istanbul. Dimitrov, suffering from a serious illness, died by suicide on 13 March 1933, in Sofia.
