= Ivan Garvanov =

Bulgarian revolutionary (1869–1907)

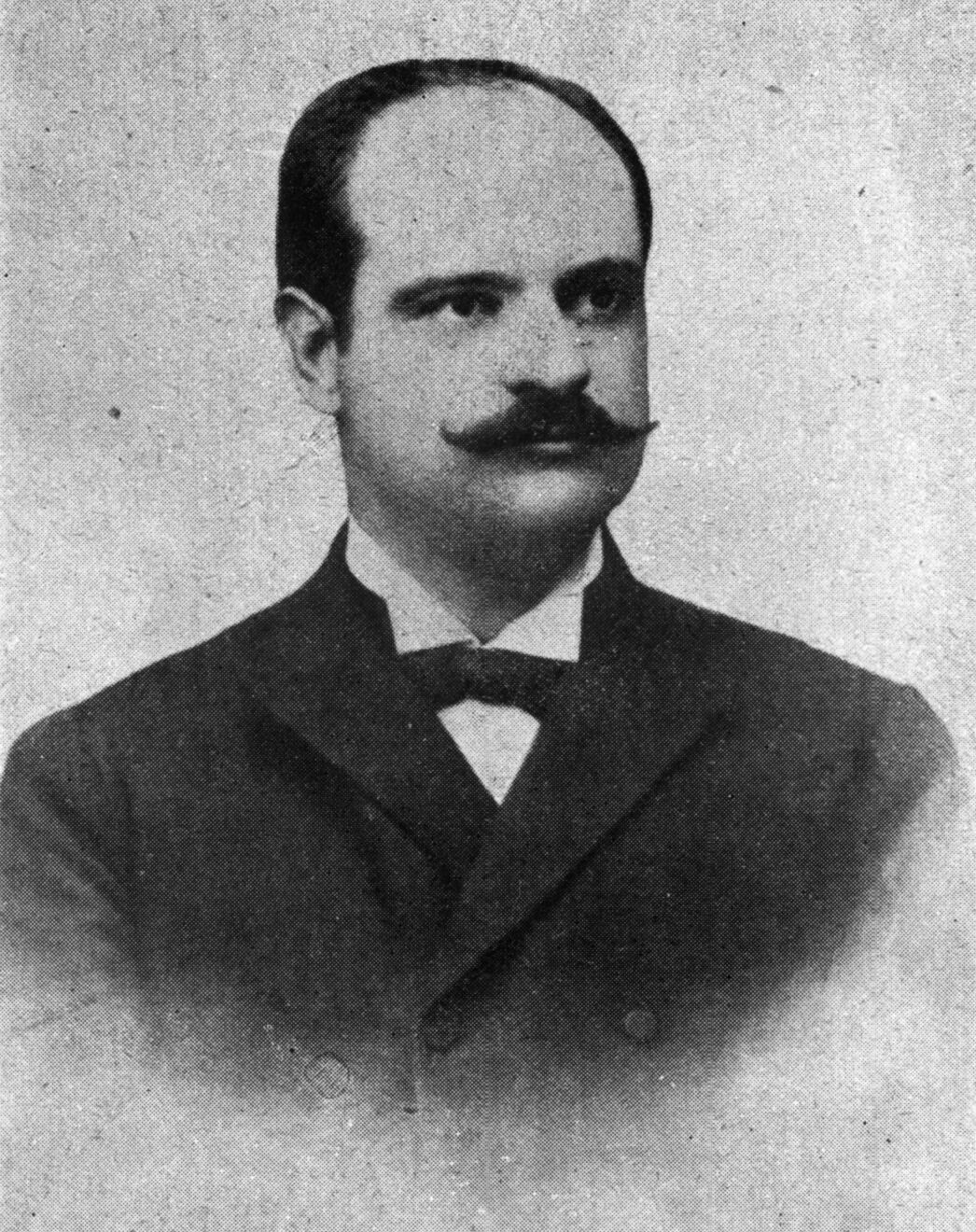
- Born: December 23, 1869; Stara Zagora, Ottoman Empire (modern Bulgaria)
- Died: November 23, 1907 (aged 37); Sofia, Bulgaria

Ivan Garvanov (Bulgarian: Иван Гарванов; December 23, 1869 – November 28, 1907) was a Bulgarian teacher, revolutionary and leader of the Internal Macedonian Revolutionary Organization. He was the main proponent of the Ilinden-Preobrazhenie uprising.

== Biography ==
Ivan Georgiev Garvanov was born on December 23, 1869, in Stara Zagora, Ottoman Empire, into a rich family. His father was the wealthy merchant Georgi Ivanov, who was killed during the Russo-Turkish War (1877–1878), along with his grandfather and uncle. He received his primary education in his hometown and graduated from high school in Plovdiv in 1888. Garvanov worked as a teacher in Stara Zagora from 1888 to 1889, after which he attended and graduated from the physics and mathematics department of the Higher School (modern Sofia University) in 1892. In 1893/1894, he specialized in physics at the University of Vienna and in July 1894, he defended his doctoral dissertation. From 1894 to 1903, he was a teacher of physics and mathematics at the Bulgarian Men's High School of Thessaloniki.

As a moderate, Garvanov initially believed that the Bulgarian cause in Macedonia could be advanced through education, that liberation would be achieved through intervention by the Principality of Bulgaria and that revolutionary activity would only bring unnecessary suffering to the locals. He established and led the anti-Internal Macedonian Revolutionary Organization (IMRO) Bulgarian Secret Revolutionary Brotherhood in 1897, as it was suggested to him by the Bulgarian Exarchate. It was planned that the new organization would oppose IMRO and its revolutionary activities, and replace it. In that period, he advocated against a premature uprising. Due to factional violence with IMRO, he became a supporter of the Supreme Macedonian-Adrianople Committee (SMAC). In 1899, Garvanov developed close ties with Boris Sarafov, who had become the leader of SMAC. Sarafov managed to achieve a reconciliation between the Brotherhood and IMRO. In September 1899, the Brotherhood was disbanded and its members joined IMRO. Garvanov became a member of IMRO in September 1900, when he was also elected as a member of its Thessaloniki District Committee, with Sarafov's help.

At the beginning of 1901, an IMRO activist was arrested in Thessaloniki by the Ottomans and was tortured to reveal the names of other IMRO activists, resulting in the arrests of members of IMRO's Central Committee. Ivan Hadzhinikolov, anticipating his arrest, gave IMRO's archives to Garvanov. IMRO leaders Gotse Delchev and Gyorche Petrov took refuge in Bulgaria. Garvanov sent five stamped blank warrants to SMAC to enable Bulgarian officers to enter Ottoman Macedonia as “instructors”. In February 1901, he became the leader of IMRO's new Central Committee in Thessaloniki. Garvanov was accepted as the new leader to prevent the disbandment of the whole organization. As Garvanov possessed the seals and codes of IMRO's Central Committee, Petrov and Delchev advised all local committees to assist only detachments or individuals with a certificate signed by the two of them, seeking to challenge Garvanov's bureaucratic power. He called for an uprising, arguing that the failed Gorna Dzhumaya uprising, which SMAC organized in 1902, had caused a chain of events which could overcome IMRO. His fellow citizen Atanas Iliev recounted his meeting with Garvanov in 1902, asserting that he spoke with enthusiasm about the patriotic mood of the Bulgarians in Macedonia: "They deserve a man who to work for their holy cause," Garvanov asserted. In January 1903, he led a congress to decide on an uprising. Delegates were carefully selected so that the uprising would get approved. A number of leaders were absent, such as Gotse Delchev and Dame Gruev (who was imprisoned). He scheduled the uprising for the spring, but did not set a date.

Duncan M. Perry described him as the "architect of Ilinden". After the Thessaloniki bombings of 1903, he was arrested, sentenced to life imprisonment and exiled to the Kastello fortress in Rhodes, but in 1904 he was amnestied in accordance to the Bulgarian-Ottoman agreement of 1904, that settled the consequences of the Ilinden Preobrazhenie Uprising. He settled in Sofia, where he was a teacher at the Second Boys' High School. The failure of the Ilinden uprising split IMRO into factions. The left-wing (federalist) faction opposed Bulgarian nationalism but the right-wing (centralist) faction of the IMRO, drifted more and more towards it. After the uprising, he became a leader of the right-wing faction. He also became a representative of the Skopje revolutionary district. Garvanov and Sarafov planned to kill IMRO's left-wing leader Yane Sandanski and his associates. However, Michail Daev, an associate of Sandanski, who switched sides, failed in this task, as his best man, Todor Panitsa betrayed him. As a consequence, the leaders of the Centralist's faction were sentenced to death by the Serres Regional Committee on the charge that they were acting on behalf of the Bulgarian state to subordinate the Serres activists who were struggling for the organization's independence and integrity. Garvanov, along with Sarafov, was assassinated by Todor Panitsa at Sarafov's home in Sofia, on the orders of Sandanski, on November 28, 1907. State funerals were held for him and Sarafov.

== Legacy ==
Streets in Sofia, Plovdiv and Blagoevgrad in Bulgaria are named after Garvanov. A commemorative plaque has been placed on the site of the house where Ivan Garvanov was born in Stara Zagora.

The historiography in North Macedonia has given a negative connotation to Garvanov, explicitly pointing out that he was a "pronounced Vrhovist" (Supremist) and a "Bulgarian from Bulgaria". It is claimed there that allegedly the IMRO leaders were betrayed by Garvanov in order for him to seize control over the Organization, transforming it into a tool of the "Vrhovists".
