= Bulgarian Secret Revolutionary Brotherhood =

Statute of the Brotherhood (1897).

The Bulgarian Secret Revolutionary Brotherhood (Bulgarian: :Българско тайно революционно братство) was organized by a small group of Bulgarian conservatives, adherents of evolutionary methods of struggle, in Salonica, then in the Ottoman Empire.

In 1897, in the face of the growing power of Internal Macedonian Revolutionary Organization (IMRO), these moderates, led by Ivan Garvanov, who was then a teacher at the Bulgarian Men's High School of Thessaloniki, set up a rival organization, called Revolutionary Brotherhood, which entered into friendly relations with the Macedonian Supreme Committee and began setting up branches in various towns throughout Macedonia and Southern Thrace. Inevitably, the Brotherhood clashed with the IMRO, and there were even mutual attempts at assassination, although nobody was actually killed. When Boris Sarafov was elected to the leadership of the Macedonian Supreme Committee, with the help of Bulgarian Exarchate he managed to effect a reconciliation, and in 1899, the Brotherhood was dissolved and its members joined the IMRO. Its members as Ivan Garvanov, were to exert a significant influence on the Internal Organization. They were to push for the Ilinden-Preobrazhenie Uprising and later became the core of IMRO right-wing faction.

== See also ==
- Macedonian Question
- Ilinden–Preobrazhenie Uprising
