= Kosta Shahov =

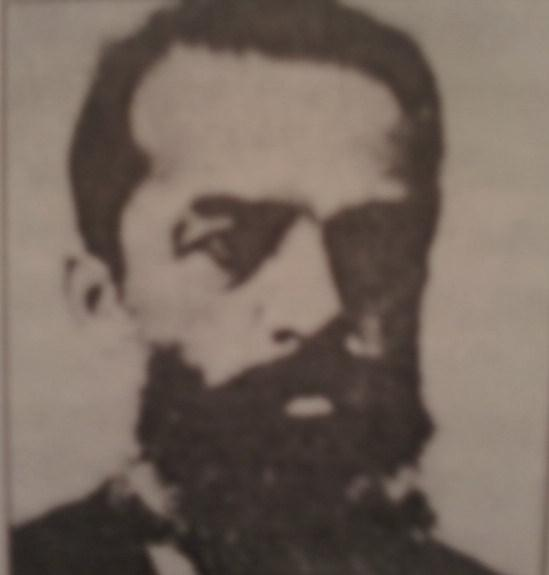
Kosta Shahov

Kosta S. Shahov (Bulgarian and Macedonian: Коста С. Шахов) was a Macedonian Bulgarian public figure, journalist, activist of the Young Macedonian Literary Society and the Supreme Macedonian-Adrianople Committee.

Shahov was born on April 14, 1862, in Ohrid, Ottoman Macedonia. He graduated law at Sofia University in 1894 and worked in Ruse in the municipality government, and later in the Court of Appeal. Shahov was among the founders of the Young Macedonian Literary Society, the author of its Statute and Rules and an active contributor to the magazine Loza. He published the newspaper "Macedonia" (1888 - 1912 with some interruptions), "Strannik", "Glas Makedonski" (1893 - 1898), "Borba za svobodata na Makedonia i Odrinsko", "Borba" (1905) and others. In 1892 Shahov met with Ivan Hadzhinikolov and Gotse Delchev and facilitates the establishment of the future Internal Macedonian Revolutionary Organization (IMRO). Shahov was among the founders of the Supreme Macedonian-Adrianople Committee in 1894. He worked as the director of the district prison in Sofia. After the Bulgarian army occupied a large part of then Eastern Serbia in 1915, Shakhov returned to his hometown and was appointed chairman of the Bulgarian regional commission. He died in Ohrid on August 15, 1917.
