= Anastasov =

Anastasov or Anastassov is a patronym and surname.

== Surname ==
Notable people with the surname include:

- Ivan Anastasov (died 1904), Greek revolutionary
- Nikola Anastasov (1932–2016), Bulgarian actor
- Vladimir Anastasov (born 1963), 1988 Ordzhonikidze bus hijacker
- Orlin Anastassov (born 1976), Bulgarian opera singer
- Stanislav Anastasov (born 1983), Bulgarian politician

== Patronym ==
Notable people with the patronym include:

- Kuzman Anastasov Shapkarev (1834–1909), Bulgarian folklorist and ethnographer
- Veselin Anastasov Stoyanov (1902–1969), Bulgarian composer
- Aleks Anastasov Bozhev (born 2005), Bulgarian footballer
