= Velin Alaykov =

- Born: 1882; Bogoslov, Bulgaria
- Died: November 17, 1922
- Organization(s): IMARO, IMRO

Velin Alaykov (Bulgarian: Велин Алайков) was a Bulgarian revolutionary, a worker of the Internal Macedonian-Adrianople Revolutionary Organization (IMARO) and the Internal Macedonian Revolutionary Organization (IMRO).

== Biography ==
Alaykov was born in 1882 in the village of Bogoslov, Kyustendil district. He studied in his village and then in the smithery school in Samokov, where he participated in the secret revolutionary section “Trayko Kitanchev”, under the supervision of Nikola Dechev. Before he finished his schooling, in 1900 Alaykov entered the revolutionary band of Argir Manasiev operating in the area of Gevgelija. During 1902 Alaykov was a freedom fighter in the area of Kratovo with the revolutionary band of Dime Berbercheto, and in the period 1904-1905 he operated in Kochansko with the revolutionary band of Krastyo Balgariyata.

At the end of 1906 Alaykov returned in Bulgaria and enrolled the Bulgarian army. He finished the Military school in Sofia and was promoted to senior sergeant. He participated in the wars for Bulgarian national unification during the period 1912-1918 and was rewarded two medals for bravery “Za hrabrost”. After the First World War he settled in Kyustendil when he took part in the activity of IMRO, that was reorganized by Todor Aleksandrov, and became a local chief of the organization in Kyustendil. He was responsible for the supply of weapons and logistics for the revolutionary bands on their way to Vardar Macedonia.

In 1920 Alaykov was chosen president of the Union of Reserve Sergeants in Kyustendil. He participated in the negotiations between the IMRO and the hostile government of Aleksandar Stamboliyski, but during the negotiations he was killed by a member of the federalist organization Grigor Tsiklev. As a result of this murder, IMRO conducted what is known as the Kyustendil action.
