= Bulgarian Constitutional Clubs =

Bulgarian Constitutional Clubs Съюз на българските конституционни клубове
- Leader: Toma Karayovov; Vladimir Rumenov; Todor Lazarov
- Founded: 7 September 1908
- Dissolved: 18 November 1909
- Split from: IMORO
- Headquarters: Salonica
- Ideology: Bulgarian interests

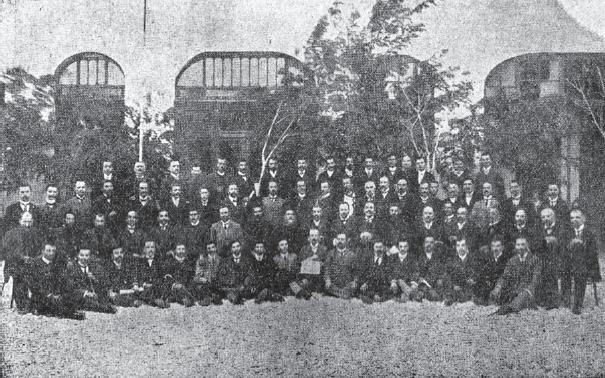
Constituent Assembly of UBCC in September 1908.

Bulgarian Constitutional Clubs, also known as Union of the Bulgarian Constitutional Clubs (Bulgarian: Съюз на българските конституционни клубове), was an ethnic Bulgarian political party in the Ottoman Empire, created after the Young Turk Revolution, by members of the Internal Macedonian Adrianople Revolutionary Organization. The party functioned for a little over a year - from September 1908 until November 1909. Its main political rival was the Peoples' Federative Party (Bulgarian Section).

== Inauguration, ideas and goals ==
The Constituent assembly of the party was held between 7 and 13 September 1908 in Solun. Attending the congress were 72 representatives of the Macedonian-Bulgarian middle class, but only two farmers, one craftsman and one worker. A statute and an agenda of the organization were soon established:

"The Bulgarian Constitutional Club has as its aim:

a) to give civic and political education of the Bulgarian people in the spirit of the constitutional freedoms in autonomous Macedonia and Adrianople;

b) to preserve and develop Bulgarian culture."

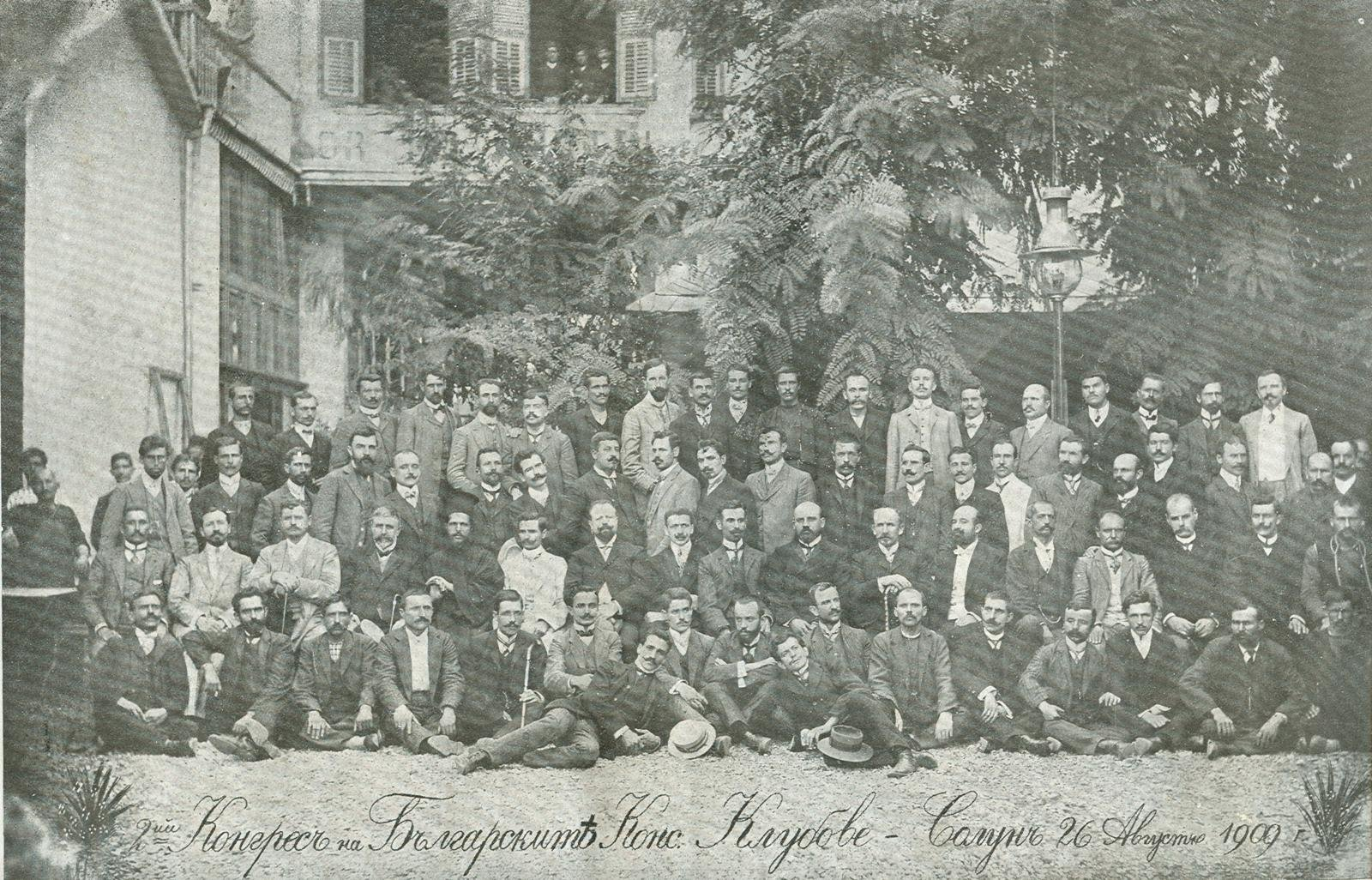
First Regular Congress of UBCC, Solun, 1909

Toma Karayovov, Vladimir Rumenov, Todor Lazarov were voted members of the Central Committee. Among the founders of the party were also Georgi Kulishev, Georgi Bazhdarov, Kiril Parlichev, Andon Dimitrov, Hristo Batandzhiev, Simeon Radev and others. Hristo Tatarchev openly supported UBCC, although he never participated in the organization's affairs.

Otechestvo (Fatherland in Bulgarian) served as the party's newspaper. An article, dedicated to the Ilinden-Preobrazhenie Uprising and published in issue 43 of the newspaper from 18 July 1909, reads:

"The tenth of July (Huriet), is an epilogue of Ilinden: Ilinden is the most solemn act of the great Macedonian revolutionary struggle. Without Ilinden there would be no 10 July. The latter date is all-Ottoman. Ilinden belongs to us, the Bulgarians."

The Union of the Bulgarian Constitutional Clubs put emphasis on the collective rights of the non-Turkish peoples in the Ottoman Empire; agricultural and social reforms, aiming an improvement of the lives of Christians. The party concentrated efforts on the subject of autonomy for Macedonia and the region of Adrianople. It also believed in the important role of the Bulgarian Exarchate in unifying Bulgarians from those regions. The organization was a strong opponent to the colonization of the Macedonian land by Muslim settlers.

On 23 August 1909, the Ottoman parliament accepted a law banning national political organizations and parties, and the Bulgarian Constitutional Clubs was dissolved.
