= Aleksandar Andreev =

Bulgarian revolutionary (1883–1928)

Voivode Aleksandar Andreev
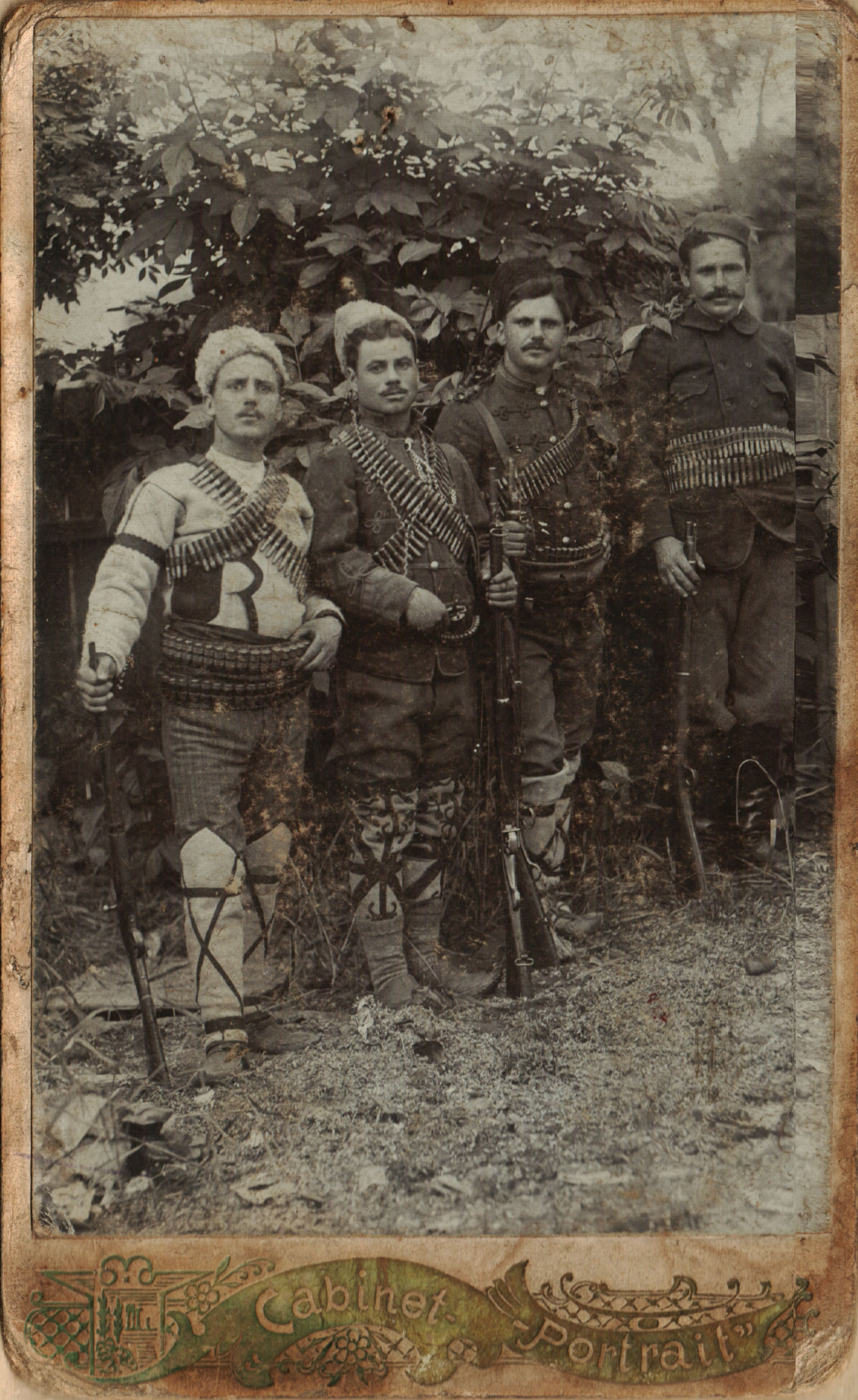
- Aleksandar Adreev (far right).
- Native name: Александър Андреев
- Birth name: Aleksandar Ivanov Andreev; Александър Иванов Андреев
- Nickname: Chapata
- Born: 20 July 1883 Sofia, Tsardom of Bulgaria
- Died: 1928 (aged 44–45) Sofia, Tsardom of Bulgaria
- Allegiance: IMRO; Kingdom of Bulgaria
- Conflicts: Macedonian Struggle; Ilinden Uprising; Balkan Wars; First Balkan War; Second Balkan War; World War I; Macedonian front

Aleksandar Ivanov Andreev (Bulgarian: Александър Иванов Андреев) (20 July 1883 – 1928), nicknamed Chapata, was a Bulgarian revolutionary, a leader of an Internal Macedonian-Adrianople Revolutionary Organization (IMARO) revolutionary band.

== Biography ==
Aleksandar Andreev was born in 1883 in Sofia. After he finished high school in Sofia, he became a revolutionary in the armed band of Krastyo Asenov in Gevgeliya. Later, he was a member of the revolutionary bands of Hristo Chernopeev and Ivan Naumov Alyabaka, with whom he operated in the regions of Kichevo and Veles. In August 1907, he became a leader for the region of Veles.

After the Young Turk Revolution, in July 1908, he returned in Sofia, but the next year, when the IMARO was restored by Todor Aleksandrov, Hristo Chernopeev and other eminent members of the organization, he took an active involvement in the revolutionary movement. In May 1911, he again became a leader of a revolutionary band in the region of Veles, and in 1912 he operated with the band of Tane Nikolov in the regions of Thessaloniki and Enidzhe Vardar.

He participated in the Balkan Wars and the First World War, in the guerrilla bands, organized and led by the IMARO.

In 1918, he retired from revolutionary activity and settled in Sofia, where he died in 1928.
