= Ivan Hadzhinikolov =

Bulgarian revolutionary (1861–1934)

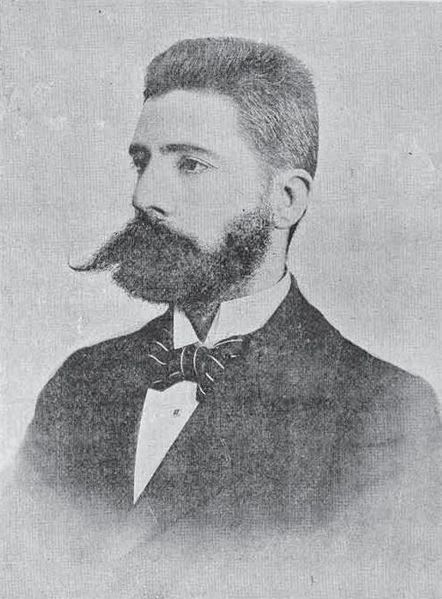
Ivan Hadzhinikolov

Ivan Atanasov Hadzhinikolov (Bulgarian: Иван Атанасов Хаджиниколов, Macedonian: Иван Атанасов Хаџи Николов, romanized: Ivan Atanasov Hadži Nikolov; December 24, 1861 – July 9, 1934) was a Macedonian Bulgarian revolutionary, teacher and bookseller. He was among the founders of the Internal Macedonian Revolutionary Organization (IMRO) on October 23, 1893.

== Biography ==
Ivan Hadzhinikolov was born in Kukush, Ottoman Empire, on December 24, 1861. He received elementary and secondary education in Kukush, Plovdiv and Svishtov. Then Hadzhinikolov graduated in higher education at commerce in Linz. After that he worked as a Bulgarian teacher in Kostenets, Edessa, Kukush and Thessaloniki. In 1876, he created a revolutionary youth group. From 1888 to 1892, he taught arithmetic and bookkeeping at the Bulgarian Men's High School of Thessaloniki. Hadzhinikolov was a member of the Young Macedonian Literary Society. In June 1892, he met with Kosta Shahov and Gotse Delchev in Sofia and discussed with them his idea of founding a revolutionary organization in Ottoman Macedonia.

With his return to Thessaloniki in 1893, he became involved in the book trade, opening his own bookstore in the city. On October 23, 1893, he was one of the founders of the Internal Macedonian Revolutionary Organization (IMRO) in Thessaloniki. The meeting occurred in his house. He claimed that he was the first person to have considered an organization like IMRO, writing that it was established to "neutralize the foreign propaganda in Macedonia", especially the "activities of the Serbian agitators" (Serbian propaganda), and preserve the "Bulgarian national feeling in Macedonia". According to historian Mercia MacDermott, leading members of IMRO, such as him and Dame Gruev, were initially perceived by the Exarchists as "vagabonds", however as the Organization increasingly attracted youths, the Exarchists changed their policy and attempted to seize control of the Organization. Hadzhinikolov was a member of the Central Committee of IMRO from 1894 to 1901. Anticipating his arrest in 1901 after an affair because an IMRO activist gave the Ottomans information under torture and the arrests of the other members of the Central Committee, he promptly handed over the IMARO archives (containing codes, seals, lists of networks, addresses, ciphers, etc.) to Ivan Garvanov, who became the new leader of the Organization. Subsequently, he was arrested by the Ottomans and sent into exile in Bodrum Castle in Asia Minor. After the Ottoman amnesty in 1903, he settled in Sofia. He supported the decision to start an uprising in 1903. During the Balkan Wars (1912–1913), Hadzinikolov was a volunteer in the Macedonian-Adrianopolitan Volunteer Corps in the Bulgarian army.

After the wars, he was a representative of the Thessaloniki Brotherhood at the Constituent Assembly of the Union of Macedonian Emigrant Organizations, held in Sofia from November 22 to 25, 1918. On July 9, 1934, he committed suicide in Sofia.

His grandson is the Bulgarian sculptor Alexandar Dyakov (1932–2018). He is considered a Macedonian by the historiography in North Macedonia.
