= Ivan Katardžiev =

Macedonian historian (1926–2018)

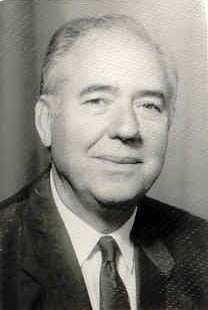
Ivan Katardžiev

Ivan Katardžiev (Macedonian: Иван Катарџиев; Bulgarian: Иван Катарджиев; January 6, 1926 – December 1, 2018) was a Macedonian historian. He was regarded as the country's most important expert on the Internal Macedonian Revolutionary Organization (IMRO) and the Macedonian history under Yugoslavia as well as the early years of independence. He was also director of the Macedonian Institute for National History.

== Biography ==
Katardžiev was born in 1926 in Ploski, Bulgaria, in the region also known as Pirin Macedonia. He graduated from high school in Sveti Vrach, Bulgaria and during the "cultural autonomy" of Pirin Macedonia in 1946, he was sent by the Bulgarian communist authorities to study history in the capital of the newly proclaimed SR Macedonia, Skopje. In 1948, he was among the 13 students from Pirin Macedonia in Skopje, out of a total of about 140 there, who signed a declaration against the new decisions of the Central Committee of the Bulgarian Communist Party. With them, the "cultural autonomy" practically stopped and a return to the party's position from before 1934, of denying the Macedonian identity, began. Thus, in practice, Katardžiev remained living in Yugoslavia.

In the 1950s he was head of the University Library of Skopje, the Diaspora Office and served as secretary of the Institute for National History of Macedonia. In 1961 he promoted the thesis the first official name of the IMRO was Bulgarian Macedonian-Adrianopolitan Revolutionary Committees.

In recent years Katardžiev criticized the then Macedonian ruling party, the VMRO – DPMNE, for rehabilitating several IMRO revolutionaries, who had previously been blacklisted during Yugoslav rule for being Bulgarophiles. However, Bulgarian researchers maintain that Katardžiev himself had some manifestations when he publicly claimed the IMRO revolutionaries had Bulgarian self-awareness.

In October 2014 the Lustration Commission of Macedonia named Katardžiev as an informer of the Communist Yugoslavia's UDBA during the 1950s. They accused him of spying on history students who originated from Bulgarian Macedonia. Katardžiev at the time was head of the University Library in Skopje as well as the Diaspora Office. Katardžiev denied the claims, and said he was pressured himself by the police between 1955 and 1960.

On December 1, 2018, Katadžiev died in Skopje at age 92.

== Works ==
- The Serres District from the Kresna Uprising to the Young Turks Revolution (1968)
- Time of the Maturation: The Macedonian National Question between the Two World Wars, 1919–1930 (1977)
- The Struggle for the Development and Affirmation of the Macedonian Nation (1981)
