= Internal Macedonian Revolutionary Organization =

Secret revolutionary society (1893–1934)

- Вътрешна македонска революционна организация (Bulgarian)
- Emblem of the IMRO
- Founders: Hristo Tatarchev, Petar Poparsov, Hristo Batandzhiev, Dame Gruev, Ivan Hadzhinikolov, Andon Dimitrov
- Leaders: Gotse Delchev, Dame Gruev, Hristo Matov, Gyorche Petrov, Ivan Garvanov, Yane Sandanski, Boris Sarafov, Todor Aleksandrov, Aleksandar Protogerov, Ivan Mihailov
- Founded: 23 October 1893 (4 November N.S.); Thessaloniki, Salonika Vilayet, Ottoman Empire (now Greece)
- Dissolved: 14 June 1934
- Groups: BPMARO, MFO, ITRO, Ilinden; BSRB, IMRO (U), MSRC, SMAC, IDRO, Boatmen of Thessaloniki
- Anthem: March of the Macedonian Revolutionaries
- Status: Revolutionary Organisation
- Flag

The Internal Macedonian Revolutionary Organization (IMRO; Cyrillic: ВМРО (VMRO); Bulgarian: Вътрешна македонска революционна организация, romanized: Vatreshna Makedonska Revolyutsionna Organizatsiya; Macedonian: Внатрешна македонска револуционерна организација, romanized: Vnatrešna Makedonska Revolucionerna Organizacija) was a secret revolutionary society founded in the Ottoman territories in Europe that operated in the late 19th and early 20th centuries.

It was founded in 1893 in Salonica and initially aimed to secure autonomy for Macedonia and Adrianople regions in the Ottoman Empire. However, it later became an agent serving Bulgarian interests in Balkan politics. IMRO modeled itself after the earlier Bulgarian Internal Revolutionary Organization of Vasil Levski and accepted its motto "Freedom or Death" (Свобода или смърть). According to the Organization's earliest statute from 1894, the membership was reserved exclusively for Bulgarians. This was later changed on the initiative of Gotse Delchev, who wanted IMRO to depart from its exclusively Bulgarian nature, so he opened the membership for all inhabitants of European Turkey, and the organization began to acquire a more separatist stance. Delchev sought autonomy for Macedonia under the slogan Macedonia for the Macedonians. However, these new formulas as a whole failed to attract other ethnic groups, as they generally perceived it as "the Bulgarian Committee"; eventually, IMRO's base remained only among Bulgarian millet-affiliated Slavic speakers in Ottoman Macedonia and in Adrianople vilayet. It used the Bulgarian language in all its documents and in its correspondence. The Organisation established its Foreign Representation in 1896 in Sofia. Starting in the same year, it fought the Ottomans using guerrilla tactics, and in this, they were successful, even establishing a state within a state in some regions, including their tax collectors. This struggle escalated in 1903 with the Ilinden–Preobrazhenie Uprising. The fighting involved about 15,000 IMRO irregulars and 40,000 Ottoman soldiers, lasting for over seven weeks. After the uprising failed, and the Ottomans destroyed some 100 villages, the IMRO resorted to more systematic forms of terrorism targeting civilians. More importantly, the Ilinden disaster splintered IMRO and signalled the beginning of a fratricidal conflict between the left-wing faction ("federalists") who continued to favor autonomy as a step towards independent Macedonia and its inclusion into a future Balkan Federation, and the right-wing faction ("centralists") which favored unification with Bulgaria. In fact, the division was a culmination of a conflict which existed within IMRO since its formation. It was based partially on ideology, and partly in terms of personality and locality, and it would plague the Macedonian revolutionary movement over the next decades.

During the Balkan Wars and the First World War, the organization supported the Bulgarian army and joined Bulgarian wartime authorities when they temporarily took control over parts of Thrace and Macedonia. IMRO's adherents regarded the division of the area among the Balkan states in the Balkan Wars not as "liberation", but as entailing the partition of Macedonia. Retaining the unity of Macedonia seemed crucial for IMRO in this period; autonomism as a political tactic was abandoned, and annexationist positions were supported, aiming eventual incorporation of occupied areas into Bulgaria. The desire to incorporate most of Macedonia and Thrace within a Bulgarian state lay behind the Bulgarian decision to enter each of these three wars. The Bulgarian government first attached the IMRO chetas as auxiliaries of its army in the Balkan wars and then drafted the former paramilitaries directly into it, as Bulgarian military personnel during the First World War. Under the right-wing leadership, IMRO arose then from a clandestine organization into an important factor of the Greater Bulgarian policy, supporting the Bulgarisation of the area. Additionally, some guerrilla companies formed by IMRO-irregulars participated in several massacres of accused Serbomans in the areas of Azot, Skopska Crna Gora and Poreče. Regular Bulgarian troops took control of the region while komitadjis were appointed mayors or prefects and served as gendarmerie corps. IMRO detachments participated in the suppression of the Serbian Toplica uprising. Nevertheless, the division within IMRO during this period continued to exist, and the wars reinforced the rival federalist and unionist tendencies in the IMRO factions. These two tendencies were consequently adopted in the interwar period, the first one by the "federalist" wing and the latter by the "centralist" wing.

After World War I, the combined Macedonian-Thracian revolutionary movement separated into two detached organizations, IMRO and ITRO. Simultaneously, the "federalists" split up and formed the Macedonian Federative Organization and later IMRO (United). After this, the IMRO earned a reputation as an ultimate terror network, seeking to change state frontiers in the Macedonian regions of Greece and Serbia (later Yugoslavia). They contested the partitioning of Macedonia and launched raids from their Petrich stronghold into Greek and Yugoslav territory. Their base of operation in Bulgaria was jeopardized by the Treaty of Niš, and the IMRO reacted by assassinating Bulgarian prime minister Aleksandar Stamboliyski in 1923, with cooperation of other Bulgarian elements who organised a coup d'état. In 1925, the Greek army launched a cross-border operation to reduce the IMRO base area, but it was ultimately stopped by the League of Nations, and IMRO attacks resumed. A conflict over the leadership arose and Ivan Mihailov ordered the assassination of Aleksandar Protogerov, which sparked a fratricidal war between the so called "Mihailovists" and "Protogerovists". By 1928, after the assassination of Protogerov, Mihailov proposed a new plan calling for unification of a pre-1913 Macedonia region into a single state, that would be independent from Bulgaria. In the interwar period the IMRO also cooperated with the Croatian Ustaše, and their ultimate victim was Alexander I of Yugoslavia, assassinated in France in 1934. After the 1934 Bulgarian coup d'état, their Petrich stronghold was subjected to a military crackdown by the Bulgarian army, and the IMRO was reduced to a marginal phenomenon. According to Ivan Katardžiev, practically, neither the left nor the right wing of the IMRO questioned their Bulgarian provenance and Dimitar Vlahov would do so only in 1948 at a Politburo's session of the Macedonian Communist Party.

The organization changed its name on several occasions, but the name VMRO (IMRO) remained most noted. After the fall of communism in the region, numerous parties claimed the IMRO name and lineage to legitimize themselves. Among them, the right-wing parties established in the 1990s, "VMRO-BND" in Bulgaria and "VMRO-DPMNE" in then Republic of Macedonia.

== Ottoman era ==
=== Origins and goals ===
The organization was a secret revolutionary society operating in the late 19th and early 20th centuries with the goal of autonomous Macedonia and Adrianople regions. It was founded in 1893 in Ottoman Thessaloniki by a small band of anti-Ottoman Macedono-Bulgarian revolutionaries, who considered Macedonia an indivisible territory and all of its inhabitants "Macedonians", no matter their religion or ethnicity, thus signaling the emergence of a new, firmly Macedonian national movement. In practice, IMRO was established by Bulgarians in Macedonia and the vast majority of their followers were Slavic speakers in Ottoman Macedonia, of whom primarily Bulgarian Exarchists. At that time IMRO was often called "the Bulgarian Committee", while its members were designated as Comitadjis, i.e. "committee men". Initially, it was against the irredentist aspirations of neighboring states in the area. From its foundation, IMRO was evidently torn apart by political and ideological factionalism, members shared significantly conflicting views concerning Macedonia, Macedonians, and their relation with Bulgaria. Some of them saw the autonomy evolving into independent Macedonia, that would become a member of a future Balkans federal state. Others saw the outcome of the autonomy as unification of Macedonia and Adrianople with Bulgaria. The idea of autonomy was strictly political and did not imply a secession from Bulgarian ethnicity. Even those, who advocated for independent Macedonia and opposed Greater Bulgaria, never doubted the predominantly Bulgarian character of the Macedonian Slavs. The organization was founded by Hristo Tatarchev, Dame Gruev, Petar Pop-Arsov, Andon Dimitrov, Hristo Batandzhiev and Ivan Hadzhinikolov. All of them were closely connected with the Bulgarian Men's High School of Thessaloniki.

According to Hristo Tatarchev's "Memoirs", IMRO was first called simply the Macedonian Revolutionary Organization (MRO), but he noted that he didn't remember it very clearly, clarifying the word "Bulgarian" was later dropped from its name. (Note: In his memoirs from 1928 Tatarchev, when mentioning its first name and structure, noted that he does not remember it very clearly, making the remark: "as far as I can remember." So far, no statutes or other basic documents with a similar name have been discovered from this period. According to Macedonian specialist Ivan Katardziev, the Organization never bore an official name MRO. In Tatarchev's own recollections from 1934 he maintains that in the first statute, the membership was allowed for every Bulgarian, from any region and that the possibility for membership of other nationalities was open in 1896 in a new statute. It seems he had mix up in his different memoires the circumstances from the first and from the second congresses of IMRO, hold in 1894 and 1896 respectively, when a different statutes were adopted. In 2026 in the Turkish Directorate of State Archives a previously unknown handwritten statute was discovered The document dates from 1898, when they fell into the hands of the Ottomans. It is stored in an electronic folder described as: "Regarding the harmful instructions prepared by the Bulgarian Committee for the Bulgarians in the Adrianople Vilayet and Macedonia, and their translations." The statute itself bears the name: "Statute of the Bulgarian Revolutionary Committee in European Turkey".) However neither statutes nor regulations, or other basic documents with such names have not yet been found. Thus, according to the Macedonian historian Ivan Katardžiev, the organization never bore as an official name the designation "Macedonian Revolutionary Organisation". It is believed by the historians that in 1894 or 1896, this probably unofficial name, was changed to Bulgarian Macedonian-Adrianople Revolutionary Committees (BMARC); and the organisation existed under this name until 1896 or 1902, when it was changed to Secret Macedonian-Adrianople Revolutionary Organization (SMARO). Some Macedonian historians also acknowledge the existence of the name "ВMARC" in the very early period of the Organisation (1894–1896), while others dispute it. Thus, in North Macedonia it is generally assumed that in the period 1896–1902, the name of the organization was "SMARO". It is not disputed that the organization changed its name to Internal Macedonian-Adrianople Revolutionary Organization (IMARO) in 1905 and it is under this name referred to in Bulgarian historiography. After disbanding itself during the first Bulgarian annexation of Macedonia (1915–1918), the organization was revived in 1919 under the name Internal Macedonian Revolutionary Organization (IMRO), under which it is generally known today.

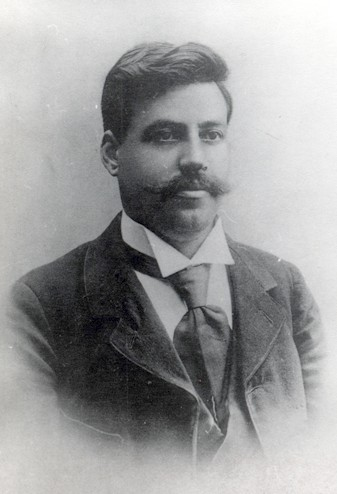
Gotse Delchev

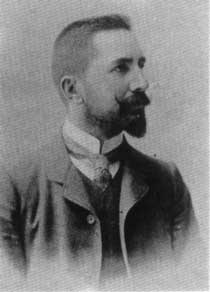
Hristo Tatarchev

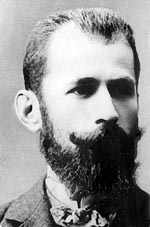
Dame Gruev

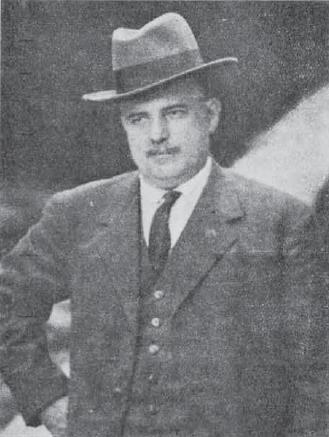
Petar Pop Arsov

The Adrianople Region was the general name given by the Organization to those areas of Thrace which, like Macedonia, had been left under Turkish rule i.e. most of it, where the Bulgarian element predominated in the mixed population, too. The organized revolutionary movement in Thrace dates from 1895, when Dame Gruev recruited Hristo Kotsev, born in Shtip, who was then a teacher in the Bulgarian Men's High School of Adrianople. Acting in the name of the Central Committee, Kotsev set up a regional committee in Adrianople, and gradually committees were established in a large area.

The stated goal of the origanization was to unite all elements dissatisfied with the Ottoman oppression in Macedonia and the Adrianople Vilayet, eventually obtaining full political autonomy for the two regions. In this task, it hoped to enlist the support of the local Aromanians and Megleno-Romanians, Greeks and even Turks. Efforts were concentrated on moral propaganda and the prospect of rebellion and terrorist actions seemed distant. The organization developed quickly, only in a matter of a few years it managed to well-establish itself with a wide network of local committees across Macedonia and the Adrianople Vilayet. This was achieved through the exploitation of the extensive school network of the Bulgarian Exarchate since teachers constituted the basis of IMRO. Although within IMRO there were Bulgarian sympathies, they coexisted with the desire for multi-ethnic autonomous Macedonia. Thus, IMRO preferred to disassociate itself from the official Bulgarian policy and not to be under Bulgarian governmental control, despite that it was receiving arms and financial support from them. The leadership thought that it was using Bulgaria as a source of funds and the Exarchate for its own gain while "working under a Bulgarian mask" and establishing its own non-Bulgarian agenda.

Some of the leaders espoused radical socialist and anarchist ideas and saw as their goal the establishment of an independent Macedonian state rather than unification with Bulgaria. Moreover, they started encouraging a separate "Macedonian" political loyalty and became hostile towards the Exarchate, which was a proponent of Bulgarian nationalism. The leader of this leftist faction was Goce Delchev. Under the motto Macedonia for the Macedonians, Delchev headed the struggle for an independent Macedonia which he imagined as a multi-ethnic region. Delchev's views were emphasized in the statute of SMARO from 1896 or 1902, which he co-wrote with Gyorche Petrov. Accordingly, the organization changed the exclusively Bulgarian character and began to accept all Macedonians and Adrianopolitans regardless of ethnicity or creed, and also called for elimination of chauvinist propaganda and nationalistic disputes in attempt to unite the divided population. However, besides some Aromanian members, its membership remained overwhelmingly Slavic, based among Bulgarian Exarchists.

=== Armed struggle against the Ottomans ===
The initial period of idealism for SMARO ended, however, with the Vinitsa Affair and the discovery by the Ottoman police of a secret depot of ammunition near the Bulgarian border in 1897. The wide-scale repressions against the activists of the organization led to its transformation into a militant guerilla organization, which engaged into attacks against Ottoman officials and punitive actions against suspected traitors. The guerilla groups of SMARO, known as "chetas" (чети) later (after 1903) also waged a war against the pro-Serbian and pro-Greek armed groups during the Greek Struggle for Macedonia.

SMARO's leadership of the revolutionary movement was challenged by two other factions: the Supreme Macedonian-Adrianople Committee (SMAC) in Sofia (Vurhoven makedono-оdrinski komitet – Върховен македоно-одрински комитет) and a smaller group of conservatives in Salonica – Bulgarian Secret Revolutionary Brotherhood (Balgarsko Tayno Revolyutsionno Bratstvo). The latter was incorporated in SMARO by 1899, its members as Ivan Garvanov, were to exert a significant influence on the organization. They were to push for the Ilinden-Preobrazhenie Uprising and later became the core of IMRO right-wing faction.

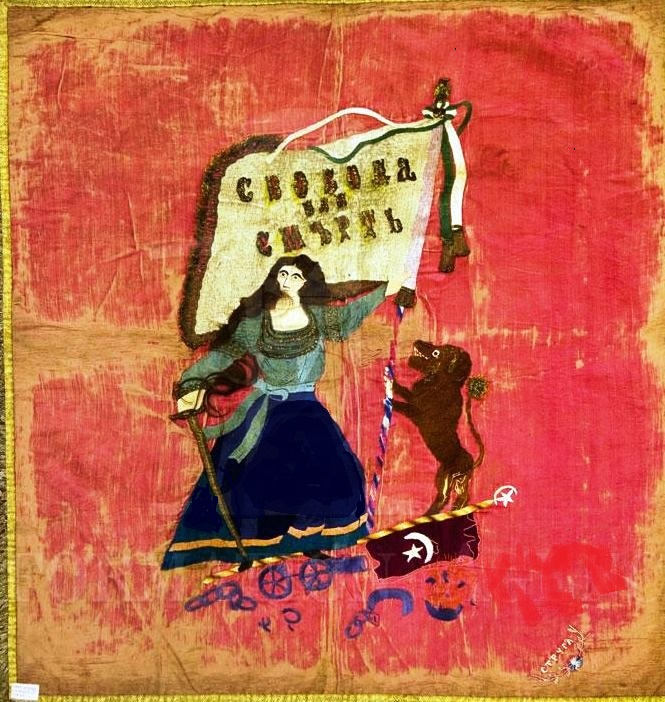
The battle flag of the Struga insurgent detachment during the Ilinden uprising with the motto Свобода или смърть

Although SMARO and SMAC shared the goal of autonomy there were several critical differences between them. The SMARO thought that autonomy can be achieved by waging an insurgency campaign that would allure the attention and intervention of the Great Powers, as it was the case previously in other Balkan examples. While for the SMAC the liberation was achievable only by cooperation with Bulgaria and especially the Bulgarian army. Furthermore, the SMARO preferred an independent Macedonia as part of a future Balkan Federation, on the other hand for the SMAC the autonomy was a first step to unification with Bulgaria. Finally, and probably most critically, the SMARO was much more ambiguous to the term Macedonian, for them being the regions inhabitant was more important than ethnicity, while for the SMAC being Macedonian was equivalent to being Bulgarian. SMAC became known earlier than SMARO, after the 1895 raids into Turkish territory it organised from Bulgaria. Its founders were Macedonian immigrants in Bulgaria as well as Bulgarian army officers. They became known as the "supremists" or "externals" since they were based outside of Macedonia. The supremists resorted to terrorism against the Ottomans in the hope of provoking a war and thus Bulgarian annexation of Macedonia. SMAC maintained close relations with the political establishment in Bulgaria and wanted IMRO to be subordinated to them, and Bulgarian army officers to dominate their activity, while IMRO wanted to remain independent of governmental control. For a time between 1899-1901, SMARO and SMAC cooperated, however, disagreements continued in this period and after 1901 their relations became increasingly hostile and violent. SMAC split into two factions: one loyal to the SMARO and one led by some officers close to the Bulgarian prince. The second one staged an ill-fated uprising in Eastern Macedonia in 1902, where they were opposed militarily by local SMARO bands led by Yane Sandanski and Hristo Chernopeev, who were later to become the new leaders of the IMARO left-wing.

In April 1903, a group of young anarchists connected with SMARO, called Gemidžiite – graduates from the Bulgarian secondary school in Thessaloniki – launched a campaign of terror bombing in Thessaloniki with the aim to attract the attention of the Great Powers to Ottoman oppression in Macedonia and Eastern Thrace.

In May 1903 the undisputed leader of the organization, Goce Delchev, was killed in a skirmish with Turkish forces. Although Delchev had opposed the ideas for an uprising as premature, he finally had no choice but agree to that course of action but at least managed to delay its start from May to August. In August 1903 SMARO organised the Ilinden-Preobrazhenie Uprising against the Ottomans in Macedonia and the Adrianople Vilayet, which after the initial successes including the forming of the Krushevo Republic, was crushed with much loss of life.

=== After Ilinden ===
The failure of the 1903 insurrection resulted in the eventual split of the IMARO into a left-wing (federalist) faction in the Serres, Strumica and Salonica districts, and a right-wing faction (centralists) in the Bitola and Skopje districts. Among the socialist inspired leaders of the left-wing were Yane Sandanski, Hristo Chernopeev, Dimo Hadzhidimov, Petar Pop Arsov, Gyorche Petrov and Pere Toshev. While in the right-wing the leaders were Ivan Garvanov, Boris Sarafov, Hristo Matov and Hristo Tatarchev. The autonomist tradition of Goce Delchev was preserved by the federalists who were correlated with Sandanski's close supporters which were known as the Serres group or Sandanists. They strictly opposed Bulgarian nationalism and advocated for full political independence of Macedonia and joining a future Balkan Federation as a separate polity with equality and freedom for all its subjects and nationalities. Furthermore, the federalists were determined to withstand the irredentist aspirations of capitalist Bulgaria and their bourgeois political order whose ruler, Prince Ferdinand, considered Macedonia a future Bulgarian province. Accordingly, it was presumed that growing relations with the Bulgarian government and reliance would lead to infiltration of Bulgarian political propaganda and nationalist ideology, and subsequently to their dominion over IMARO. The Supreme Macedonian Committee was disbanded in 1905, but the centralist faction practically took over his role and they were more agreeable of a close collaboration with the Bulgarian government, as they considered that IMARO without Bulgarian political support and military intervention was unable to defeat the Ottomans. Through them the Bulgarian government assumed authority of IMARO, which drifted more and more towards Bulgarian nationalism as its regions became increasingly exposed to the incursions of Serb and Greek armed bands, which started infiltrating Macedonia after 1903. The years 1904–1908 saw much fighting between IMARO and Turkish forces, as well as between IMARO and Greek and Serb bands. During this period the armed Albanian bands of Çerçiz Topulli cooperated and were on good terms with armed groups of Bulgarian-Macedonian revolutionaries operating in the Lake Prespa region and Kastoria area, a bond formed due to their hostility toward Greeks. Meanwhile, the clash between the IMARO factions was characterized with mafia style killings on a larger scale, and culminated when in 1907 upon Sandanski's instructions, Todor Panitsa assassinated the right-wing leaders Boris Sarafov and Ivan Garvanov.

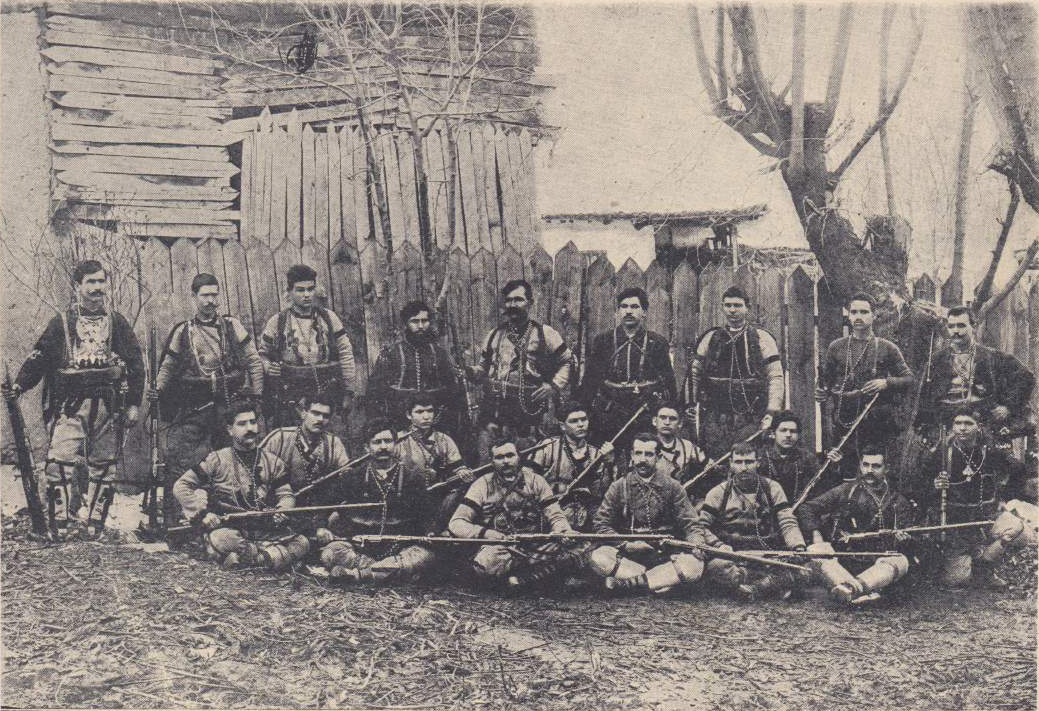
Apostol Petkov (far left) and his band.

After the Young Turk Revolution of 1908 both factions laid down their arms and joined the legal struggle. Yane Sandanski and Hristo Chernopeev contacted the Young Turks and started legal operation. They tried to set up the Macedonian-Adrianople Revolutionary Organization (MARO). Initially, the group developed only propaganda activities. Later, the congress for MARO's official inauguration failed and federalist wing joined mainstream political life as the Peoples' Federative Party (PFP), in the hope of gaining equality within the Ottoman state and aspiring to unite all nationalities of Macedonia. Some of its leaders like Sandanski and Chernopeev participated in the march on Istanbul to depose the counter-revolutionaries. The former centralists formed the Union of the Bulgarian Constitutional Clubs and like the PFP participated in Ottoman elections. Soon, however, the Young Turk regime turned increasingly nationalist and sought to suppress the national aspirations of the various minorities in Macedonia and Thrace. This prompted most right-wing and some left-wing IMARO leaders such as Chernopeev to resume the armed fight in 1909. In January 1910 Hristo Chernopeev and some of his followers founded a Bulgarian People's Macedonian-Adrianople Revolutionary Organization which merged with IMARO in 1911 and a new Central Committee of IMARO was formed consisting of Todor Aleksandrov, Hristo Chernopeev and Petar Chaulev. Its aim was to restore unity to the Organisation and direct the new armed struggle against the Turks more efficiently. After Chernopeev was killed in action in 1915 as a Bulgarian officer in World War I, he was replaced by the former supremist leader General Alexander Protogerov.

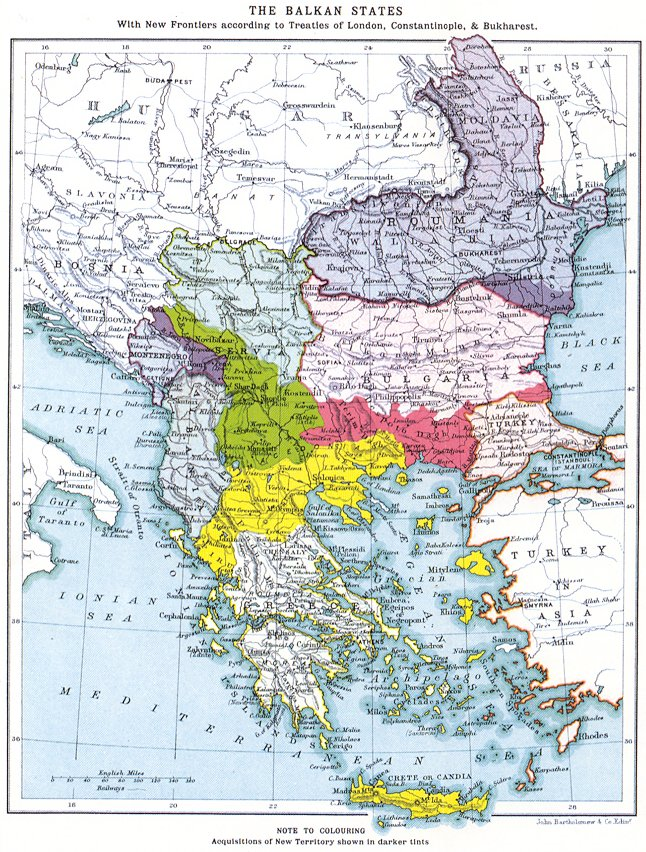
The partition of Macedonia and Adrianople Thrace in 1913

=== Balkan Wars and World War I ===
During the Balkan Wars former IMARO leaders of both the left and the right joined the Macedonian-Adrianopolitan Volunteer Corps and fought with the Bulgarian Army. Others like Sandanski with their bands assisted the Bulgarian army with its advance and still others penetrated as far as the region of Kastoria southwestern Macedonia. In the Second Balkan War IMORO bands fought the Greeks and Serbs behind the front lines but were subsequently routed and driven out. Notably, Petar Chaulev was one of the leaders of the Ohrid-Debar Uprising organised jointly by IMORO and the Albanians of Western Macedonia.

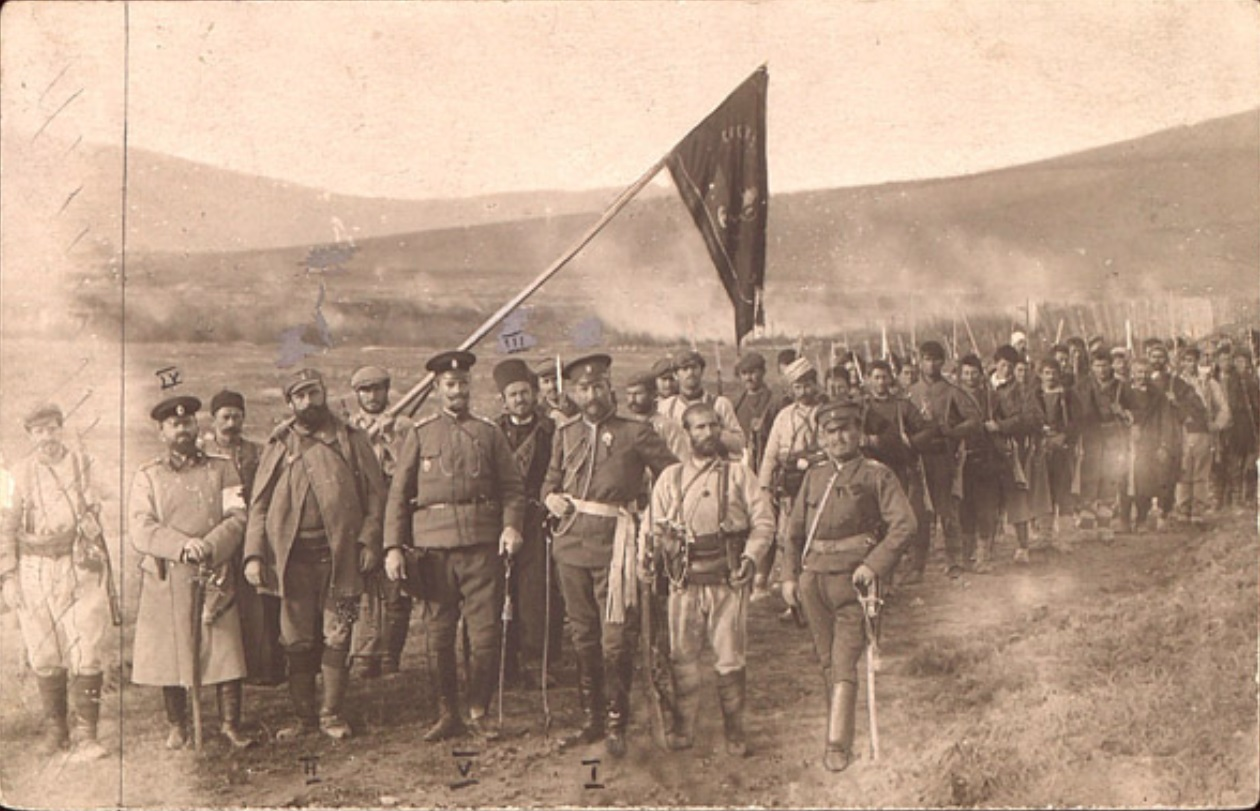
Sandanski (left in front of flag) with his IMARO members unit, under independent command, supporting Bulgarian troops during the Balkan Wars

The Tikvesh Uprising was another uprising in late June 1913, organized by the Internal Macedonian Revolutionary Organization against the Serbian occupation of Vardar Macedonia and took place behind the Serbian lines during the Second Balkan War.

The result of the Balkan Wars was that the Macedonian region and Adrianople Thrace was partitioned between Bulgaria, Greece, Serbia and the Ottoman Empire (the new state of Yugoslavia was created as after 1918 and started its existence as Kingdom of the Serbs, Croats and Slovenians "SHS"), with Bulgaria getting the smallest share. In 1913 the whole Thracian Bulgarian population from the Ottoman part of Eastern Thrace was forcibly expelled to Bulgaria. IMARO, now led by Todor Aleksandrov, maintained its existence in Bulgaria, where it played a role in politics by playing upon Bulgarian irredentism and urging a renewed war to liberate Macedonia. This was one factor in Bulgaria allying itself with Germany and Austria-Hungary in World War I. During the First World War in Macedonia (1915–1918) the organization supported Bulgarian army and joined to Bulgarian war-time authorities when they took control over Vardar Macedonia temporarily until the end of war. In this period the autonomism as political tactics was abandoned from all internal IMARO streams and all of them shared annexationist positions, supporting eventual incorporation of Macedonia in Bulgaria. IMARO organised the Valandovo action of 1915, which was an attack on a large Serbian force. Bulgarian army, supported by the organization's forces, was successful in the first stages of this conflict, managed to drive out the Serbian forces from Vardar Macedonia and came into positions on the line of the pre-war Greek-Serbian border, which was stabilized as a firm front until end of 1918.

After 1917 the Bulgarian government started using paramilitary groups to gain control over the internal situation in both Pomoravlje and Macedonia. Aleksandar Protogerov who headed the Bulgarian occupation troops in Morava region crushed the uprising in the Toplica district with the help of IMRO irregulars. Bulgarians paramilitary groups were responsible for multiple instances of war crimes committing during the war in the parts of the Kingdom of Serbia under Bulgarian occupation.

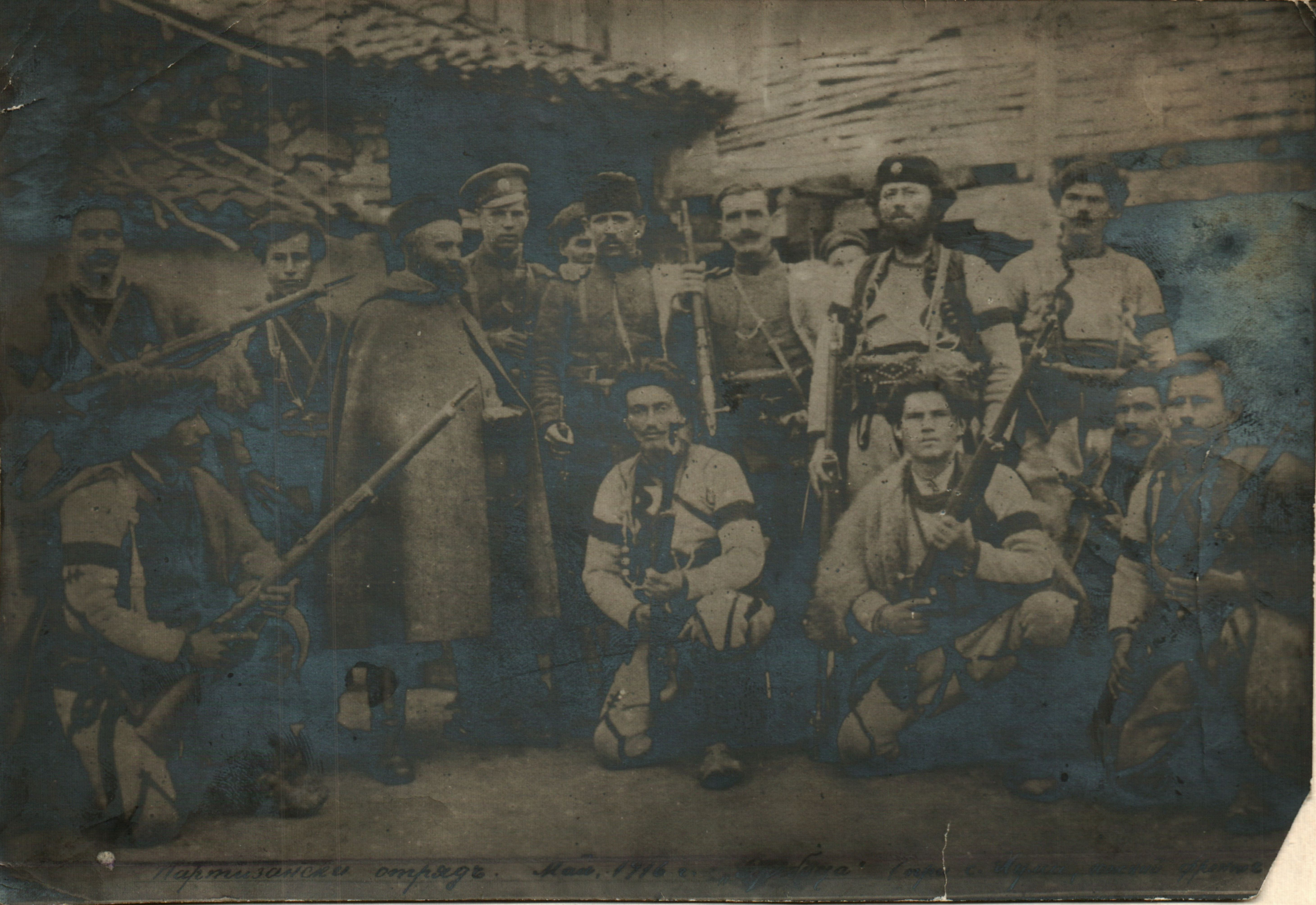
Guerilla company of the 11th Macedonian Infantry Division composed of IMRO paramilitaries during WWI

On the eve of outbreak of World War I, IMRO paramilitary activity in Serbia aimed to provoke a war with Bulgaria. At that time Serbia implemented in Macedonia a program of forced Serbianization. In an incident during 1914, when Bulgaria was still neutral, ca. 2,000 strong IMRO-cheta attacked a railway bridge over the Vardar River, massacring 477 men. In another incident in the same year, the first Macedonian recruits mobilized into the Serbian army demonstratively refused to take the military oath in Kragujevac, and were subjected to repression. As result IMRO set up a secret committee in Veles, which aim was to coordinate the transfer to Bulgaria of thousands of Macedonian deserters by the Serbian army. Later its comitadjis were incorporated into the regular Bulgarian Army and its power grew in significance. The fact that these paramilitary companies joined the Bulgarian Army marked a significant change in the way they were conducting war. At the beginning it formed the 11th Macedonian Infantry Division, and later other units, as for example guerilla companies. Its entrance into the war towards the end of 1915 contributed to the defeat and occupation of Serbia, and the unification of Macedonia with Bulgaria. In Serbia the IMRO activity was identical with the Bulgarian policy, supporting the Bulgarisation of the area. At the end of 1915 and the beginning of 1916 several massacres of (sic) Serbomans were conducted in Vardar Macedonia in the areas of Azot, Skopska Crna Gora and Poreče by IMRO-irregulars, aided by the guerrilla companies of the 11th Macedonian Infantry Division. The police chief of the Military Inspection Area of Macedonia reported to the interior minister that he cannot deal with the lawlessness of the paramilitaries. In fact 1917 was the turning point when IMRO became the instrument used by the Bulgarian government to gain control over the internal situation in the Pomoravlje and most from the region of Macedonia. At that time the IMRO leaders as general Aleksandar Protogerov headed the Bulgarian occupation troops in Morava region and crushed the uprising in the Toplica district with the help by IMRO irregulars. Their methods caused death of thousand people, destruction of their property, looting and other war crimes committed during the war in the parts of the Kingdom of Serbia under Bulgarian control.

== Interwar period ==
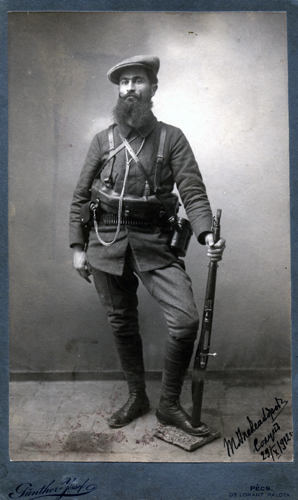
Todor Aleksandrov

The post-war Treaty of Neuilly again denied Bulgaria what it felt was its share of Macedonia and Thrace. After this moment the combined Macedonian-Adrianopolitan revolutionary movement separated into two detached organizations: Internal Thracian Revolutionary Organisation (bulg. Вътрешна тракийска революционна организация) and Internal Macedonian Revolutionary Organisation. ITRO was a revolutionary organisation active in the Greek regions of Thrace and Macedonia to the river Strymon and Rhodope Mountains between 1922 and 1934. The reason for the establishment of ITRO was the transfer of the region from Bulgaria to Greece in May 1920. ITRO proclaimed its goal as the "unification of all the disgruntled elements in Thrace regardless of their nationality", and to win full political independence for the region. Later IMRO created as a satellite organisation the Internal Western Outland Revolutionary Organisation, which operated in the areas of Tsaribrod and Bosilegrad, ceded to Yugoslavia. IMRO concentrated in Pirin Macedonia began sending armed bands called cheti into Aegean Macedonia and Vardar Macedonia and Thrace to assassinate officials and stir up the spirit of the oppressed population. The Bulgarian Prime Minister Aleksandar Stamboliyski favoured a détente with Greece and Yugoslavia, so that Bulgaria could concentrate on its internal problems, and preferred the creation of a Balkan Federation. In 1921 by the former left-wing of IMARO the Macedonian Federative Organization was formed, they were supported by Stamboliyski and had a hostile rivalry with Todor Aleksandrov's IMRO. Among the creators of this organization was one of the leaders of the former IMARO, Gyorche Petrov who was killed on the order of Aleksandrov in Sofia in June 1921.

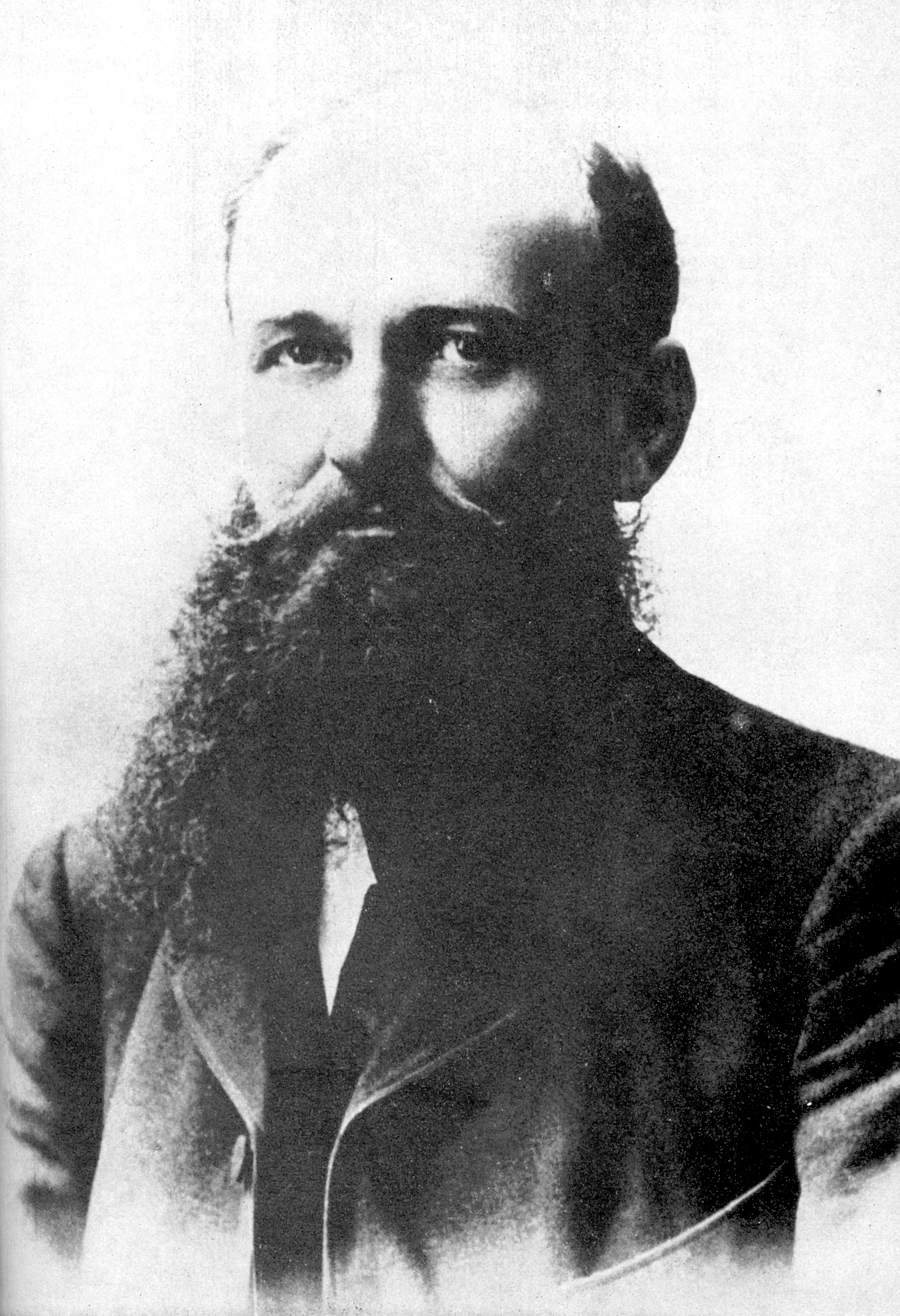
Gyorche Petrov

On 23 March 1923 Stamboliyski signed the Treaty of Niš with the Kingdom of Serbs, Croats and Slovenes and undertook the obligation to suppress the operations of the IMRO carried out from Bulgarian territory. However, in the same year IMRO agents assassinated him. IMRO had de facto full control of Pirin Macedonia (the Petrich District of the time) and acted as a "state within a state", which it used as a base for hit and run attacks against Yugoslavia with the unofficial support of the right-wing Bulgarian government and later Fascist Italy. Because of this, contemporary observers described the Yugoslav-Bulgarian frontier as the most fortified in Europe. In 1923 and 1924 during the apogee of interwar military activity according to IMRO statistics in the region of Yugoslav (Vardar) Macedonia operated 53 chetas (armed bands), 36 of which penetrated from Bulgaria, 12 were local and 5 entered from Albania. The aggregate membership of the bands was 3245 komitas (guerilla rebels) led by 79 voivodas (commanders), 54 subcommanders, 41 secretaries and 193 couriers. 119 fights and 73 terroristic acts were documented. Serbian casualties were 304 army and gendarmery officers, soldiers and paramilitary fighters, more than 1300 were wounded. IMRO lost 68 voivodas and komitas, hundreds were wounded. In the region of Greek (Aegean) Macedonia 24 chetas and 10 local reconnaissance detachments were active. The aggregate membership of the bands was 380 komitas led by 18 voivodas, 22 subcommanders, 11 secretaries and 25 couriers. 42 battles and 27 terrorist acts were performed. Greek casualties were 83 army officers, soldiers and paramilitary fighters, over 230 were wounded. IMRO lost 22 voivodas and komitas, 48 were wounded. Thousands of locals were repressed by the Yugoslav and Greek authorities on suspicions of contacts with the revolutionary movement. At the same time, a youth's extension of IMRO, the Macedonian Youth Secret Revolutionary Organization was created. The statute of MYSRO was approved personally from IMRO's leader Todor Aleksandrov. The aim of MYSRO was in concordance with the statute of IMRO – unification of all of Macedonia in an autonomous unit, within a future Balkan Federative Republic.

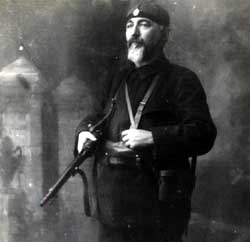
General Aleksandar Protogerov

The Sixth Congress of the Balkan Communist Federation under the leadership of the Bulgarian communist Vasil Kolarov and the Fifth Congress of the Comintern, an adjunct of the Soviet foreign policy, held concurrently in Moscow in 1923, voted for the formation of an "Autonomous and Independent Macedonia and Thrace." In 1924 IMRO entered negotiations with the Macedonian Federative Organization and the Comintern about collaboration between the communists and the Macedonian movement and the creation of a united Macedonian movement. The idea for a new unified organization was supported by the Soviet Union, which saw a chance for using this well-developed revolutionary movement to spread revolution in the Balkans and destabilize the Balkan monarchies. Aleksandrov defended IMRO's independence and refused to concede on practically all points requested by the Communists. No agreement was reached except for a paper "Manifesto" (the so-called May Manifesto of 6 May 1924), in which the objectives of the unified Macedonian liberation movement were presented: independence and unification of partitioned Macedonia, fighting all the neighbouring Balkan monarchies, forming a Balkan Communist Federation and cooperation with the Soviet Union. Failing to secure Aleksandrov's cooperation, the Comintern decided to discredit him and published the contents of the Manifesto on 28 July 1924 in the "Balkan Federation" newspaper. VMRO's leaders Todor Aleksandrov and Aleksandar Protogerov promptly denied through the Bulgarian press that they've ever signed any agreements, claiming that the May Manifesto was a communist forgery.

Shortly after the publication, Todor Aleksandrov was assassinated on 31 August, and IMRO came under the leadership of Ivan Mihailov, who became a powerful figure in Bulgarian politics. While IMRO's leadership was quick to ascribe Aleksandrov's murder to the communists and even quicker to organise a revenge action against the immediate perpetrators, there is some doubt that Mihailov himself might have been responsible for the murder. Some Bulgarian and Macedonian historians like Zoran Todorovski speculate that it might have been the circle around Mihailov who organised the assassination on inspiration by the Bulgarian government, which was afraid of united IMRO-Communist action against it. However, neither version is corroborated by conclusive historical evidence. The result of the murder was further strife within the organisation and several high-profile murders, including that of Petar Chaulev (who led the Ohrid-Debar Uprising against the Serbian occupation) in Milan and ultimately Protogetov himself.

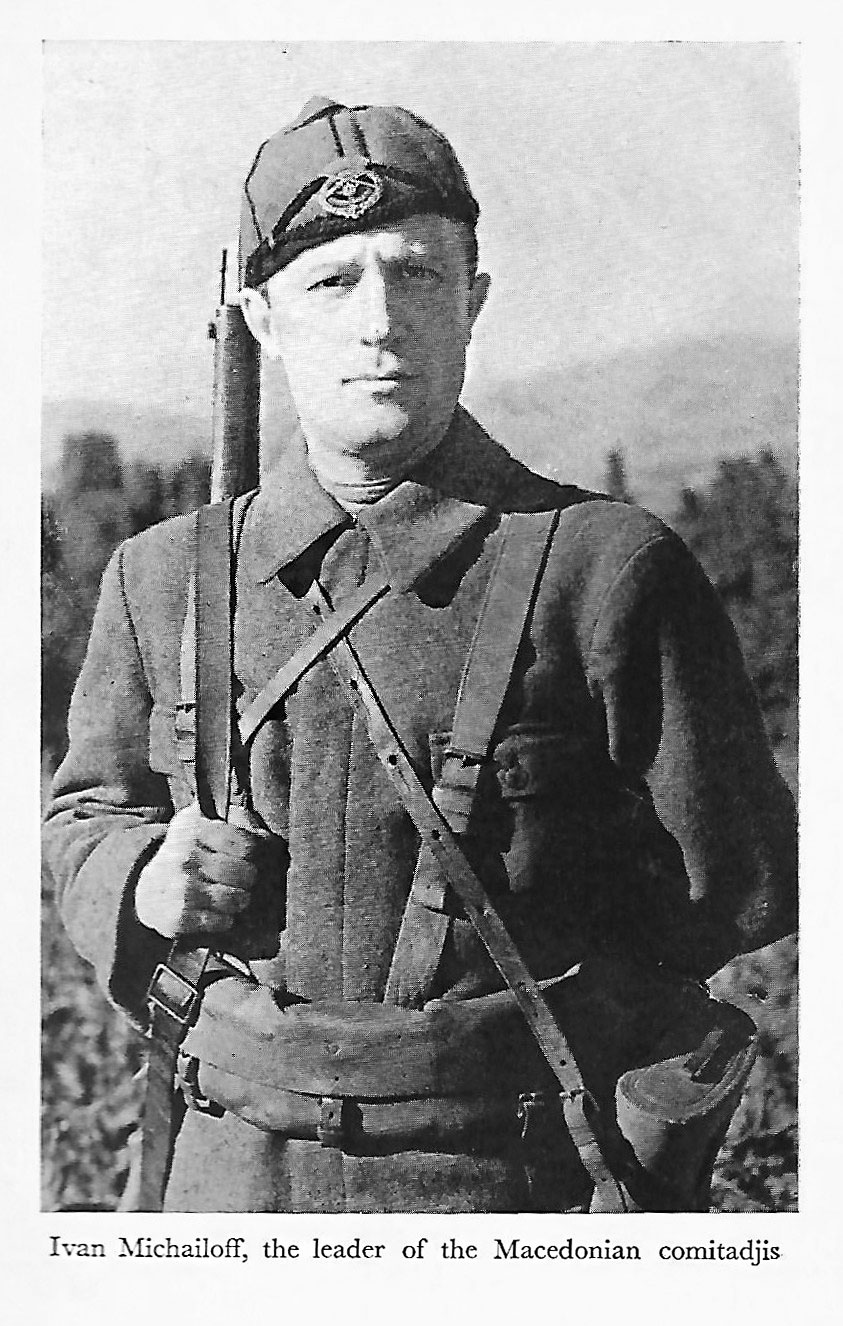
Ivan Mihailov

In this interwar period IMRO led by Aleksandrov and later by Mihailov took actions against the former left-wing assassinating several former members of IMARO's Sandanist faction, who meanwhile had gravitated towards the Bulgarian Communist Party and the Macedonian Federative Organization. In the aftermath of the May Manifesto, one of the creators of it and leaders of the left-wing, Todor Panitsa (who previously killed the right-wing oriented Boris Sarafov and Ivan Garvanov) was assassinated in Vienna in 1925 by Mihailov's future wife Mencha Karnichiu. Furthermore, Dimo Hadzhidimov, Arseni Yovkov, Vladislav Kovachev, Aleksandar Buynov, Chudomir Kantardzhiev, Stoyo Hadzhiev, Georgi Skrizhovski and many others were killed as consequence of the May Manifesto. Afterwards, the left-wing formed a new organisation based on the principles previously presented in the May Manifesto. The new organization which was an opponent to Mihailov's IMRO was called IMRO (United) and was founded in 1925 in Vienna. However, it did not have real popular support and remained based abroad with no revolutionary activities in Macedonia.

The population in Pirin Macedonia was organized in a mass people's home guard. This militia was the only force, which resisted the Greek army when the Greek dictator, General Pangalos launched a military campaign against Petrich District in 1925. Mihailov's group of young IMRO cadres soon got into conflict with the older guard of the organization. The latter were in favour of the old tactic of incursions by armed bands, whereas the former favoured more flexible tactics with smaller terrorist groups carrying selective assassinations. The conflict grew into a leadership struggle and Mihailov soon, in turn, ordered the assassination in 1928 of a rival leader, General Aleksandar Protogerov, which sparked a fratricidal war between "Mihailovists" and "Protogerovists". The less numerous Protogerovists soon became allied with Yugoslavia and certain Bulgarian military circles with fascist leanings and who favoured rapprochement with Yugoslavia. The policy of assassinations was effective in making Serbian rule in Vardar Macedonia feel insecure but in turn provoked brutal reprisals on the local peasant population. Having lost a lot of popular support in Vardar Macedonia due to his policies, Mihailov favoured the "internationalization" of the Macedonian question.

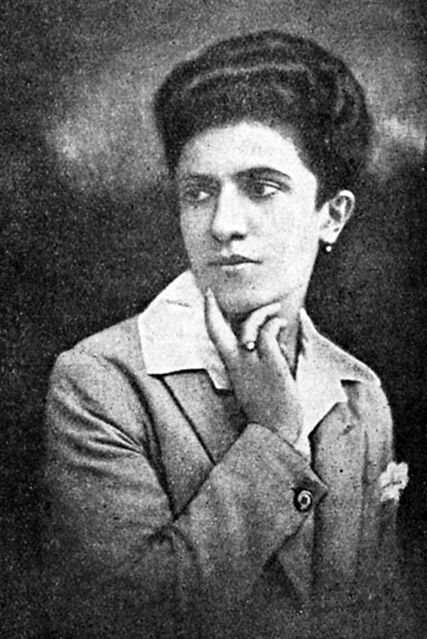
Mara Buneva assassinated Velimir Prelić, the Serb legal official of the Skopje County in 1928

Mihailov established close links with the Croatian Ustashi and Italy. Numerous assassinations were carried out by IMRO agents in many countries, the majority in Yugoslavia. The most spectacular of these was the assassination of King Alexander I of Yugoslavia and the French Foreign Minister Louis Barthou in Marseille in 1934 in collaboration with the Croatian Ustashi. The killing was carried out by the VMRO assassin Vlado Chernozemski and happened after the suppression of IMRO following the 19 May 1934 military coup in Bulgaria. IMRO's constant fratricidal killings and assassinations abroad provoked some within Bulgarian military after the coup of 19 May 1934 to take control and break the power of the organization, which had come to be seen as a gangster organization inside Bulgaria and a band of assassins outside it. Mihailov was forced to escape to Turkey and ordered to his supporters not to resist to the Bulgarian army and to accept the disarmament peacefully, thus avoiding fratricides, destabilization of Bulgaria, civil war or external invasion. In 1934 the Bulgarian army confiscated 10,938 rifles, 637 pistols, 47 machine-guns, 7 mortars and 701,388 cartridges only in the Petrich and Kyustendil Districts. Many inhabitants of Pirin Macedonia met this disbandment with satisfaction because it was perceived as relief from an unlawful and quite often brutal parallel authority. IMRO kept its organization alive in exile in various countries but ceased to be an active force in Macedonian politics except for brief moments during World War II. Meanwhile, in January 1934 a resolution of the Comintern for recognition of a distinct ethnic Macedonian ethnicity was prepared in cooperation with IMRO (United), and published in April 1934. IMRO (United) remained active until 1936 when it was absorbed into the Balkan Communist Federation.

IMRO used at that time, what the American journalist H. R. Knickerbocker described as: "the only system I ever heard of to guarantee that their members carry out assigned assassinations, no matter what the police terror might be".

== Second World War period ==
Metodi Shatorov

As the Bulgarian army entered Yugoslav Vardar Macedonia in 1941, it was greeted by most of the population as liberators from the previous oppressive and despised Serbian rule and former IMRO members were active in organising Bulgarian Action Committees, charged with taking over the local authorities. Some former IMRO (United) members, such as Metodi Shatorov, who was the regional leader of the Yugoslav Communist Party (YCP), also refused to define the Bulgarian forces as occupiers. Contrary to instructions from Belgrade and called for the incorporation of the local Macedonian Communist organisations within the Bulgarian Communist Party, who was supportive of the idea of an independent and unified Macedonia. Many former right-wing IMRO members were organized in counter-chetas and assisted the authorities in fighting Macedonian Partisans. The anti-Yugoslav policy of the Macedonian Partisans changed towards 1943 with the arrival of the Montenegrin Svetozar Vukmanović-Tempo, who began in earnest to organise armed resistance to the Bulgarian occupation. The former IMRO member Dimitar Vlahov was elected as a representative in the Presidium of AVNOJ at the end of 1943.

In Greece the Bulgarian troops, following on the heels of the German invasion of the country, occupied the whole of Eastern Macedonia and Western Thrace. In eastern and central Macedonia, some of the local Slavic-speaking minority greeted the Bulgarian troops as liberators, and efforts were undertaken by the Bulgarian authorities to "instill in them a Bulgarian national identity". Bulgaria officially annexed the occupied territories in Yugoslavia and Greece, which had long been a target of Bulgarian irredentism. The IMRO was also active in organising Bulgarian militias in Italian and German occupation zones against Greek nationalist and communist groups as EAM-ELAS and EDES. With the help of Mihailov and Macedonian emigres in Sofia, several pro-Bulgarian armed detachments "Ohrana" were organised in the Kastoria, Florina and Edessa districts. These were led by Bulgarian officers originally from Greek Macedonia – Andon Kalchev and Georgi Dimchev. It was apparent that Mihailov had broader plans which envisaged the creation of a Macedonian state under a German control. It was also anticipated that the IMRO volunteers would form the core of the armed forces of a future Independent Macedonia in addition to providing administration and education in the Florina, Kastoria and Edessa districts.

On 2 August 1944 (in what in the North Macedonia is referred to as the Second Ilinden) in the St. Prohor Pčinjski monastery at the Antifascist assembly of the national liberation of Macedonia (ASNOM) with the vice-president of the Presidium Panko Brashnarov (the former IMRO revolutionary from the Ilinden period and the IMRO United) as a first speaker, the SR Macedonia was officially proclaimed, as a federal state within SFR Yugoslavia, receiving recognition from the Allies. After the declaration of war by Bulgaria on Germany, in September 1944 Mihailov arrived in German-occupied Skopje, where the Germans hoped that he could form a pro-German Independent State of Macedonia with their support. Seeing that the war is lost to Germany and to avoid further bloodshed, he refused. Mihailov eventually ended up in Rome where he published numerous articles, books and pamphlets on the Macedonian Question.

== Post-war period ==
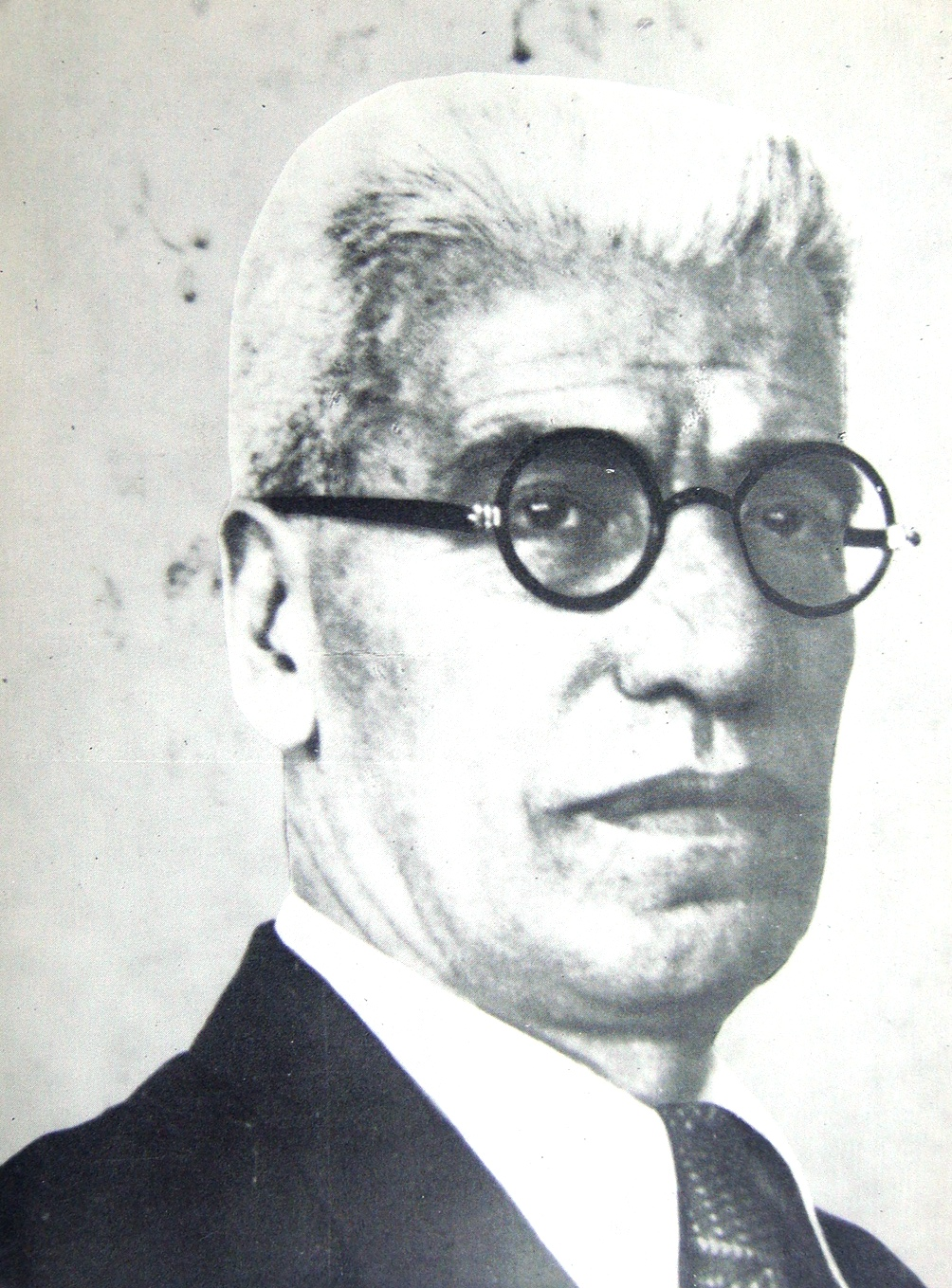
Dimitar Vlahov

Members of the IMRO (United) participated in the forming of SR Macedonia a federal state of Socialist Federal Republic of Yugoslavia and some of the leading members entered the government: Dimitar Vlahov, Panko Brashnarov, Pavel Shatev (the latter was the last surviving member of "Gemidzhii", the group that executed the Thessaloniki bombings of 1903). However, they were quickly ousted by cadres loyal to the Yugoslav Communist Party in Belgrade, who had had pro-Serbian leanings before the war. According to Macedonian historian Ivan Katardžiev such Macedonian activists who came from IMRO (United) and the Bulgarian Communist Party never managed to get rid of their pro-Bulgarian bias and on many issues opposed the Yugoslavism-educated and anti-Bulgarian oriented Macedonian communist leaders, who held most of the political power.

From the start, the Yugoslav authorities organised frequent purges and trials of Macedonian communists and non-party people charged as independence oriented. One of the victims of these campaigns was Metodija Andonov-Čento, a wartime partisan leader and president of ASNOM, who was convicted of having worked for a "completely independent Macedonia" as an IMRO member. Pavel Shatev and Panko Brashnarov went as far as to send a petition to the Bulgarian legation in Belgrade protesting the anti-Bulgarian policies of the Yugoslav leadership and the Serbianisation of the Macedonian language. Shatev later tried to negotiate with the Bulgarian authorities the frontiers of SR Macedonia, independently from Belgrade. After the Tito–Stalin split in 1948, many of the left-wing IMRO government officials, including Shatev and Brashnarov, were purged from their positions, too, then isolated, arrested, imprisoned or executed by the Yugoslav federal authorities on various (in many cases fabricated) charges including: pro-Bulgarian leanings, demands for greater or complete independence of Yugoslav Macedonia, collaboration with the Cominform, forming of conspirative political groups or organisations, demands for greater democracy, etc. A survivor among the communists associated with the idea of Macedonian independence was Dimitar Vlahov, who was pushed out of his power positions from the pro-Yugoslav circle and was used "solely for window dressing".

On the other hand, former Mihailovists were also persecuted by the Belgrade-controlled authorities on accusations of collaboration with the Bulgarian occupation, Bulgarian nationalism, anti-communist and anti-Yugoslav activities, etc. Notable victims included Spiro Kitinchev, mayor of Skopje, Ilija Kocarev, mayor of Ohrid and Georgi Karev, the mayor of Krushevo during the Bulgarian occupation and brother of Ilinden revolutionary Nikola Karev. Another IMRO activist, Sterio Guli, son of Pitu Guli, reportedly shot himself upon the arrival of Tito's partisans in Krushevo in despair over what he saw as a second period of Serbian dominance in Macedonia.

IMRO's supporters in Bulgarian Pirin Macedonia fared no better. With the help of some former Protogerovists, their main activists were hunted by the Communist police and many of them killed or imprisoned. Because some IMRO supporters openly opposed the then official policy of Communist Bulgaria to promote Macedonian ethnic consciousness in Pirin Macedonia they were repressed or exiled to the interior of Bulgaria. Many from this persecuted people emigrated through Greece and Turkey to Western countries. At this period the American and Greek intelligence services recruited some of them, trained them and later used this so-called "Goryani" as spies and saboteurs, smuggling them back to Communist Bulgaria and Yugoslavia.

Despite the fact that Yugoslav Macedonian historical scholarship reluctantly acknowledged the Bulgarian ethnic self-identification of the Ilinden IMRO leaders, they were adopted in the national pantheon of Yugoslav Macedonia as ethnic Macedonians. The Yugoslav historiography asserted a continuity between the Ilinden of 1903 and the Ilinden of ASNOM in 1944, although in the first one, the uprising in the Adrianople part of Thrace region was included as well, which Macedonian historians see as a separate uprising not related to the Ilinden one. The names of the IMRO revolutionaries were Gotse Delchev, Pitu Guli, Dame Gruev and Yane Sandanski were included in the lyrics of the anthem of the Socialist Republic of Macedonia Denes nad Makedonija ("Today over Macedonia").

== Legacy ==
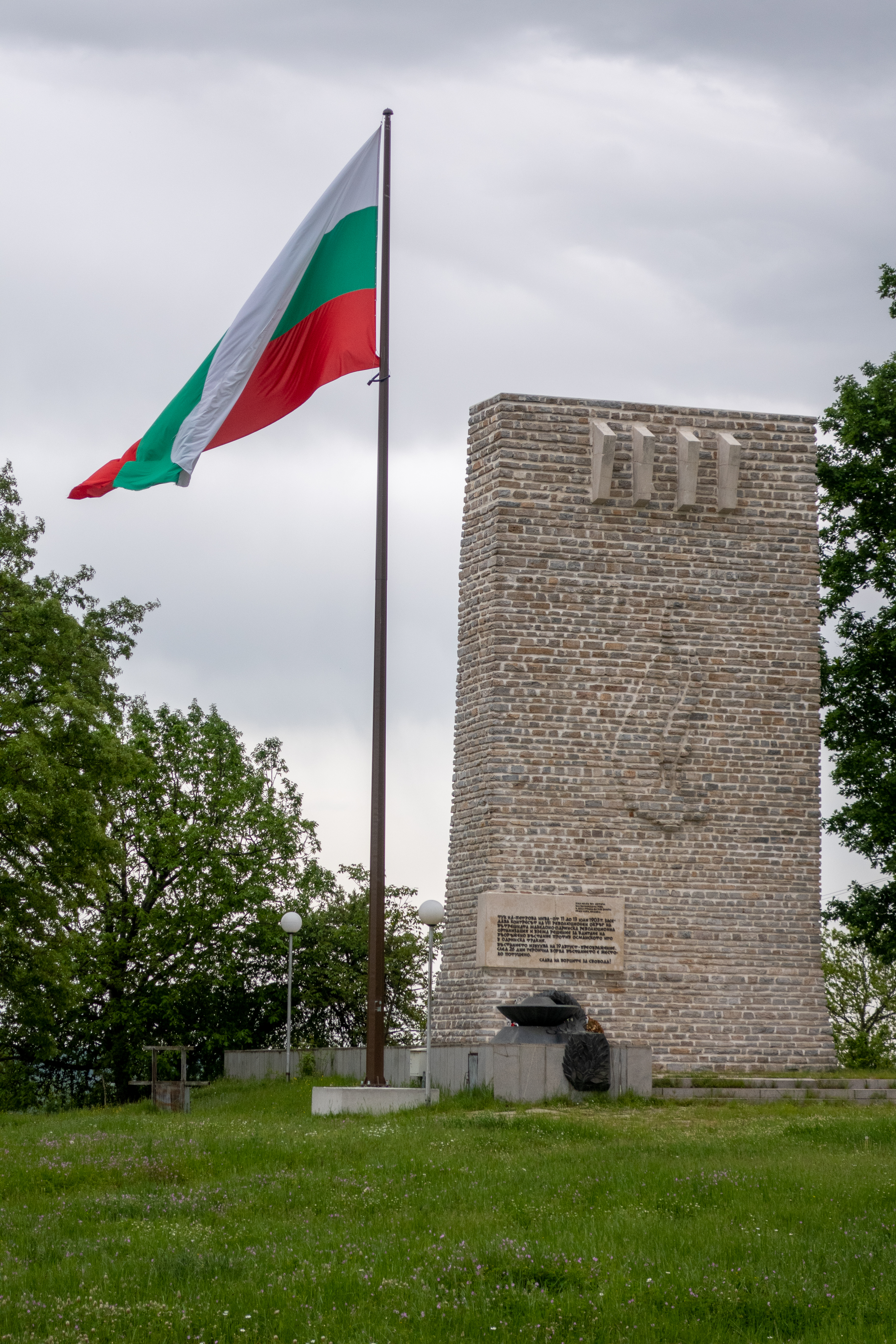
Petrova Niva monument, dedicated to the Preobrazhenie Uprising, near Malko Tarnovo, Bulgaria

Initially Lazar Koliševski, the leader of the new Yugoslav Republic—SR Macedonia, proclaimed that the Ilinden Uprising and the IMRO were Bulgarian conspiracies, but he changed his views after he faced criticism. After the Tito–Stalin split, the Bulgarian government reverted their old positions and began fiercely denying the legitimacy of the existence of a Macedonian nation. From 1948 to 1989, disputes over Macedonian history between Bulgaria and Yugoslavia had implicit political connotation and were influenced by the status of the countries relations. The historical studies in the Socialist Republic of Macedonia were expanded under direct political instructions from Belgrade. It was advanced as a key principle of the Macedonian historiography to enforce the Macedonian nation-building, and to sever any historical ties to Bulgaria, thus weakening Bulgarian irredentism. The heroes of 19th century left-wing IMRO, especially Delchev and Sandanski, were claimed by both Bulgaria and Yugoslavia, both internally and in a tactical game of international diplomacy. Both states recognized the policies of the interwar leaders of the organization Todor Aleksandrov and Ivan Mihailov as "fascist."

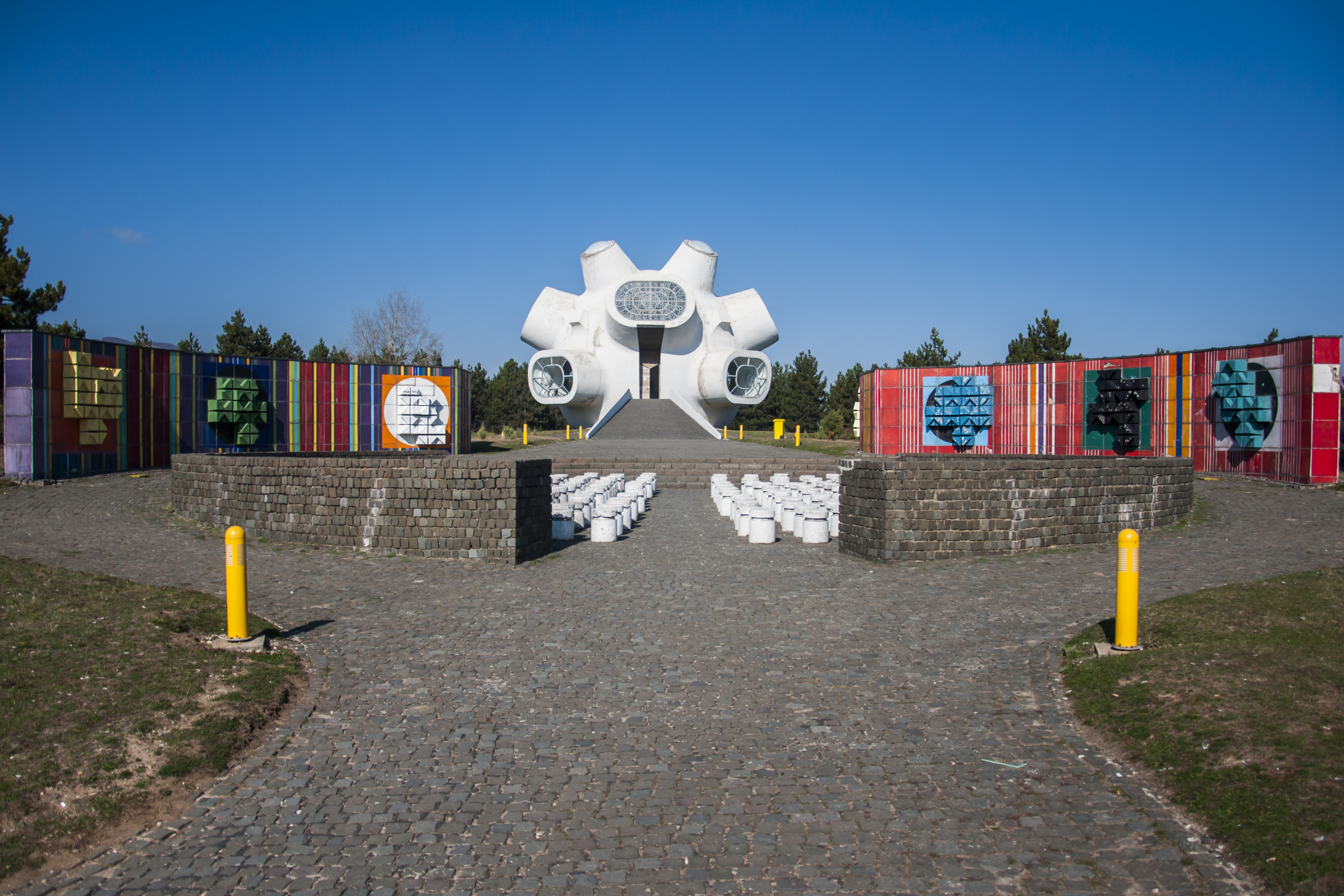
The Makedonium, a Ilinden Uprising memorial in Kruševo, built in 1974

In this race, the Socialist Republic of Macedonia was the first to incorporate the IMRO figures in its national pantheon, although some careful exceptions were made. The 1903 Ilinden Uprising was presented as a direct precursor of the 1944 events, which were termed a "Second Ilinden", in an effort to prove the continuity of the struggle for independence of the Macedonian nation. Consequently, it became necessary for the socialist authorities to show that 19th century IMRO figures, particularly Delchev and Sandanski, had been consciously Macedonian in identity. Delchev and Sandanski were adopted as symbols of the republic, had numerous monuments built in their honor, and they were often the topic of articles in the academic journal Macedonian Review, as was the Ilinden Uprising. In contrast, Todor Aleksandrov was labeled a Bulgarian bourgeois chauvinist. The asserted Macedonian identity and legacy of Sandanski was used to bolster SR Macedonia's claim to Pirin Macedonia.

In the People's Republic of Bulgaria the situation was more complex, because the IMRO was associated with the 1923–34 anti-communist regime. Before 1960, although the subject was not taboo, few articles on the topic appeared in Bulgarian academic venues, and the IMRO figures were given mostly regional recognition in the Pirin region. After 1960, orders from the highest level of the Bulgarian Communist Party were given to reincorporate the Macedonian revolutionary movement in the Bulgarian history, and to prove the Bulgarian credentials of their historical leaders. This trend reached its peak in 1981 (the 1300 year anniversary of Bulgarian state), when Delchev and Sandanski were openly made historical symbols of the Bulgarian state in a proclamation of Lyudmila Zhivkova. There were also attempts to rehabilitate Todor Aleksandrov because of his Bulgarian nationalism, but these remained controversial due to his role in suppressing the left wing, a role for which he had been declared a fascist. After the fall of Communism the approach to the history of Macedonia and the Macedonian revolutionary movement were changed significantly. Bulgarian historians sought to confirm the Bulgarian identity of the Macedonian revolutionary movement and Macedonian population as a whole. This continued even more aggressively afterwards, especially reinforced in the context of the relations with the new Republic of Macedonia. Accordingly, the great deal of the debate tended to focus on broad issues of the asserted "Bulgarian character" of the Macedonians, since Bulgaria did not recognized the Macedonian national identity necessarily even though it recognized the state. However, the legacy of IMRO remains a matter of debate and significance primarily among Bulgarians of Macedonian origin. On the other hand, for the majority of Bulgarians the significance of IMRO is marginal, due to the unfinished assimilation of Macedonian heroes into the Bulgarian national pantheon, which leads to the absence of close identification with them.

According to historian James Frusetta, one thing that two countries had in common during the communist period was that the vague populism and anarchism of these historical figures was interpreted as a definite socialist program. The conceptions about IMRO heroes have been important in the creation of a Macedonian national ideology, and in both Bulgaria and North Macedonia the historiographies thrive on proving that their version of history is wrong in turn making historical objectivity not important. According to Macedonian historian Ivan Katardžiev, practically, neither the left nor the right wing of the IMRO questioned their Bulgarian provenance. Per historian Denis Ljuljanović, both Macedonian and Bulgarian historiographies study IMRO revolutionaries through the perspective of ethno-national vacuum, providing them fixed identity in order for them to fit in their resprective nation building narratives. According to sociologist Victor Roudomentof, the IMRO concept of autonomous or independent Macedonia stimulated the growth of a distinct ethnic Macedonian identity, but widespread expansion of it was prohibited by the multi-ethnic nature of Macedonia, the partial appeal of IMRO and the propaganda efforts of Greece, Bulgaria and Serbia. Similar views have been expressed by Alexis Heraclides, in accordance with the historian Tchavdar Marinov, namely that the autonomist tradition of IMRO has contributed to the subsequent development of Macedonian nationalism.

== Political parties ==
=== North Macedonia ===
After the fall of Communism in 1989 Yugoslavia began promptly to disintegrate and multi-partyism to emerge. Many exiles returned to Macedonia from abroad, and a new generation of young Macedonian intellectuals rediscovered the history of Macedonian nationalism. In these circumstances, it was not surprising that the IMRO name was revived. A new IMRO was founded on 17 June 1990 in Skopje. Although IMRO claims a line descent from the old IMRO, there is no real connection between the old IMRO and the new one. The party is called the Internal Macedonian Revolutionary Organization-Democratic Party for Macedonian National Unity (In Macedonian: Vnatrešno-Makedonska Revolucionerna Organizacija-Demokratska Partija za Makedonsko Nacionalno Edinstvo, or VMRO-DPMNE) describes itself as a Christian Democratic party which supports the admission of Macedonia to NATO and the European Union.

A minor political party carrying the name IMRO is the Internal Macedonian Revolutionary Organization–People's Party (VMRO-NP). Although a separate structure since the split in 2004, the political line of VMRO-NP is reminiscent of VMRO-DPMNE's and its members maintain close ties with the latter's party structure.

=== Bulgaria ===
A distinct IMRO-related organization was also revived in Bulgaria after 1989, first under the name VMRO-SMD (ВМРО-СМД), commonly known as VMRO, in the form of a cultural organisation. In 1996, the leaders of the organisation registered it as a political party in Bulgaria under the name VMRO – Bulgarian National Movement (ВМРО – Българско национално движение), or ВМРО–БНД (VMRO-BNM). This group continues to maintain that ethnic Macedonians are in fact Bulgarians.

A small spin-off from VMRO-BNM existed between 2010 and 2014, named VMRO – National Ideal for Unity (ВМРО – Национален идеал за единство), or ВМРО–НИЕ (VMRO-NIU), which used VMRO-BND's flag. In 2014, NIU merged into the National Front for the Salvation of Bulgaria.

== See also ==
- Velin Alaykov
- Ivan Anastasov
- Dimitar Andonov
- Aleksandar Andreev
- Ivan Angov
- Bulgarian People's Macedonian-Adrianople Revolutionary Organization
- Internal Revolutionary Organisation
- Macedonian Question
- Thracian Bulgarians
- United Macedonia
- March of the Macedonian Revolutionaries
- Flags of Internal Macedonian-Adrianople Revolutionary Organization

== Notes ==
- "Illustration Ilinden", Sofia, 1936, b. I, p. 4–5
- "The first central committee of IMRO. Memoirs of d-r Hristo Tatarchev", Materials for the Macedonian liberation movement, book IX (series of the Macedonian scientific institute of IMRO, led by Bulgarian academician prof. Lyubomir Miletich), Sofia, 1928, p. 102, поредица "Материяли за историята на македонското освободително движение" на Македонския научен институт на ВМРО, воден от българския академик проф. Любомир Милетич, книга IX, София, 1928; contemporary Macedonian translation: Tatarchev).
- Materials about the History of the Macedonian Liberation Movement, Book V, Memoirs of Damjan Gruev, Boris Sarafov and Ivan Garvanov, Sofia 1927, pp. 8 – 11; the original in Bulgarian.
- Gyorche Petrov in his memoirs speaking about the Salonica congress of 1896 writes: "There was pointed out the need for a statute and official rules. Until then we had a very short list of rules in force, drafted by Dame (with the oath). That little list was unsystematic, lytographed. It was decided to come up with a full list of rules, a statute. When I came to Sofia, I compiled it there (with Delchev).".
- Пейо Яворов, "Събрани съчинения", Том втори, "Гоце Делчев", Издателство "Български писател", София, 1977, стр. 27: "Тоя събор утвърждава един устав на революционната организация, почти копие на стария български, твърде оригинален с положението, че само еkзархисти българи се приемат за членове на комитетите." (in Bulgarian) In English: Peyo Yavorov, "Complete Works", Volume 2, biography "Gotse Delchev", Publishing house "Bulgarian writer", Sofia, 1977, p. 27: "This meeting sanctioned a statute of the revolutionary organisation, almost a copy of the old Bulgarian, rather original because of the condition that only Bulgarians Exarchists would be admitted to membership in the committees."
- Пандев, К. "Устави и правилници на ВМОРО преди Илинденско-Преображенското въстание", Исторически преглед, 1969, кн. I, стр. 68–80. (in Bulgarian)
- Пандев, К. "Устави и правилници на ВМОРО преди Илинденско-Преображенското въстание", Извeстия на Института за история, т. 21, 1970, стр. 250–257. (in Bulgarian)
- Константин Пандев, Национално-освободителното движение в Македония и Одринско, София, 1979, с. 129–130. (Konstantin Pandev, The National Liberation Movement in Macedonia and the Odrin Region, Sofia 1979, pp. 129–130.)
- Duncan Perry The Politics of Terror: The Macedonian Liberation Movements, 1893–1903 , Durham, Duke University Press, 1988. pp. 40–41, 210 n. 10.
- Fikret Adanir, Die Makedonische Frage: ihre entestehung und etwicklung bis 1908., Wiessbaden 1979, p. 112.
- Академик Иван Катарџиев, "Верувам во националниот имунитет на македонецот", интервју, "Форум". (Academician Ivan Katardžiev, "I believe in Macedonian national immunity", interview, "Forum" magazine.)
- Битоски, Крсте, сп. "Македонско Време", Скопје – март 1997
- Public Record Office – Foreign Office 78/4951 Turkey (Bulgaria). From Elliot. 1898; УСТАВ НА ТМОРО. S. 1. published in Документи за борбата на македонскиот народ за самостојност и за национална држава, Скопје, Универзитет "Кирил и Методиј":Факултет за филозофско-историски науки, 1981, page 331 – 333.
- Prior to the publication of Pandev's article Bulgarian historiography seemed to agree that the name SMARO dates back to 1896/7 (e.g. Silyanov 1933, vol. 1, p. 46). Contemporary Macedonian historians accuse Pandev of a nationalist bias.
- Ivo Banac, The Macedoine (pp. 307–328 in of "The National Question in Yugoslavia. Origins, History, Politics", Cornell University Press, 1984)
- Ivo Banac, The Macedoine (pp. 307–328 in of "The National Question in Yugoslavia. Origins, History, Politics", Cornell University Press, 1984)
- H. N. Brailsford, Macedonia: Its races and their future, Methuen & Co., London, 1906.
- Хр. Силянов, "Освободителнитe борби на Македония, том I", изд. на Илинденската Орг., София, 1933; (Hristo Silyanov, The Liberational Struggles of Macedonia, vol. 1, The Ilinden Organisation, Sofia, 1933.)
- Albert Sonnichsen: Confessions of a Macedonian Bandit: A Californian in the Balkan Wars, Narrative Press, ISBN 1-58976-237-1.
- A letter from the headquarters of the Second Macedonian-Adrianople revolutionary district, centered around Monastir (present-day Bitola), represented by Dame Gruev and Boris Sarafov, to Bulgarian government from 9. IX. 1903. Macedonian translation.
- Krste Misirkov, On Macedonian Matters, Sofia, 1933 misirkov.org
- Krste Misirkov, On Macedonian Matters, Sofia, 1933 misirkov.org
- Георги Баждаров, "Моите спомени", издание на Институт "България – Македония", София, 2001, стр. 78–81. (In Bulgarian, In English: Georgi Bazhdarov, "My memoirs", published by the Institute "Bulgaria-Macedonia", Sofia, 2001, pp. 78–81.)
- "ДВИЖЕНИЕТО ОТСАМЪ ВАРДАРА И БОРБАТА СЪ ВЪРХОВИСТИТE по спомени на Яне Сандански, Черньо Пeевъ, Сава Михайловъ, Хр. Куслевъ, Ив. Анастасовъ Гърчето, Петъръ Хр. Юруковъ и Никола Пушкаровъ", съобщава Л. Милетичъ (София, Печатница П. Глушковъ, 1927); Материяли за историята на македонското освободително движение. Издава "Македонскиятъ Наученъ Институтъ". Книга VII. (L. Miletich, ed. Materials on the History of the Macedonian Liberation Movement, Macedonian Scientific Institute, Sofia, 1927 – "The Movement on this Side of the Vardar and the Struggle with the Supremists according to the memories of Jane Sandanski, Chernjo Peev, Sava Mihajlov, Hr. Kuslev, Iv. Anastasov – Grcheto, Petar Hr. Jurukov and Nikola Pushkarov")
- Хр. Силянов, "Освободителнитe борби на Македония, том II", изд. на Илинденската Орг., София, 1933; Silyanov (Hristo Silyanov, The Liberational Struggles of Macedonia, vol. 2, The Ilinden Organisation, Sofia, 1933.)
- Carnegie Endowment for International Peace, Report of the International Commission to Inquire into the causes and Conduct of the Balkan Wars, Published by the Endowment Washington, D.C. 1914.
- Хр. Силянов От Витоша до Грамос, Походът на една чета през Освободителната война – 1912 г., Издание на Костурското благотворително братство, София, 1920. From Vitosha to Gramos (Hr. Silyanov, From Vitosha to Gramos, published by the Kostur charitable society, Sofia, 1920)
- Любомиръ Милетичъ, "Разорението на тракийските българи презъ 1913 година", Българска Академия на Науките, София, Държавна Печатница 1918 г. Miletich] (L. Miletich, The Destruction of Thracian Bulgarians in 1913, Bulgarian Academy of Sciences, Sofia, 1918)
- Circular letter No9 issued by a secret meeting of former IMARO activists and members of its Central committee, held on 20 December 1919, cited in a collective research of the Macedonian Scientific Institute, "Освободителните борби на Македония", part 4, Sofia, 2002, retrieved on 26 October 2007: "Поради изменилите се условия в Македония и Тракия от Балканските войни насам, организацията се преименува от ВМОРО на ВМРО, като нейната цел си остава извоюване на автономия и обединение на разпокъсаните части на Македония." (in Bulgarian)
- "Македония. История и политическа съдба", колектив на МНИ под редакцията на проф. Петър Петров, том II, Издателство "Знание", София, 1998, pp. 140–141. (In Bulgarian. In English: P. Petrov, ed. Macedonia. History and Political Fate, vol. 2, Macedonian Scientific Institute, Sofia, 1998, pp. 140–141.)
- "Македония. История и политическа съдба", колектив на МНИ под редакцията на проф. Петър Петров, том II, Издателство "Знание", София, 1998, p. 206. (In Bulgarian. In English: P. Petrov, ed. Macedonia. History and Political Fate, vol. 2, Macedonian Scientific Institute, Sofia, 1998, p. 206.)
- Р.П. Гришина, "ФОРМИРОВАНИЕ ВЗГЛЯДА НА МАКЕДОНСКИЙ ВОПРОС В БОЛЬШЕВИСТСКОЙ МОСКВЕ 1922–1924 гг." in МАКЕДОНИЯ – ПРОБЛЕМЫ ИСТОРИИ И КУЛЬТУРЫ, Институт славяноведения, Российская Академия Наук, Москва, 1999. (R. P. Grishina "Formation of a View on the Macedonian Question in Bolshevik Moscow 1922–1924" in Macedonia. Problems of History and Culture, Institute of Slavistics, Russian Academy of Sciences, Moscow, 1999.)
- Р.П. Гришина, "ФОРМИРОВАНИЕ ВЗГЛЯДА НА МАКЕДОНСКИЙ ВОПРОС В БОЛЬШЕВИСТСКОЙ МОСКВЕ 1922–1924 гг." in МАКЕДОНИЯ – ПРОБЛЕМЫ ИСТОРИИ И КУЛЬТУРЫ, Институт славяноведения, Российская Академия Наук, Москва, 1999. (R. P. Grishina "Formation of a View on the Macedonian Question in Bolshevik Moscow 1922–1924" in Macedonia. Problems of History and Culture, Institute of Slavistics, Russian Academy of Sciences, Moscow, 1999.)
- Р.П. Гришина, "ФОРМИРОВАНИЕ ВЗГЛЯДА НА МАКЕДОНСКИЙ ВОПРОС В БОЛЬШЕВИСТСКОЙ МОСКВЕ 1922–1924 гг." in МАКЕДОНИЯ – ПРОБЛЕМЫ ИСТОРИИ И КУЛЬТУРЫ, Институт славяноведения, Российская Академия Наук, Москва, 1999. (R. P. Grishina "Formation of a View on the Macedonian Question in Bolshevik Moscow 1922–1924" in Macedonia. Problems of History and Culture, Institute of Slavistics, Russian Academy of Sciences, Moscow, 1999.)
- Ivo Banac, The Macedoine (pp. 307–328 in of "The National Question in Yugoslavia. Origins, History, Politics", Cornell University Press, 1984)
- "Македония. История и политическа съдба", колектив на МНИ под редакцията на проф. Петър Петров, том II, Издателство "Знание", София, 1998, pp. 205–206. (In Bulgarian. In English: P. Petrov, ed. Macedonia. History and Political Fate, vol. 2, Macedonian Scientific Institute, Sofia, 1998, pp. 205–206.)
- Palmer, S. and R. King Yugoslav Communism and the Macedonian Question, Archon Books (June 1971), pp. 65–67.
- Добрин Мичев. БЪЛГАРСКОТО НАЦИОНАЛНО ДЕЛО В ЮГОЗАПАДНА МАКЕДОНИЯ (1941–1944 г.), Македонски Преглед, 1, 1998.(Dobrin Michev, "Bulgarian National Activity in Southwest Macedonia 1941–1944", Macedonian Review, 1, 1998.)
- Palmer, S. and R. King Yugoslav Communism and the Macedonian Question, Archon Books (June 1971), pp. 112–113.
- Palmer, S. and R. King Yugoslav Communism and the Macedonian Question, Archon Books (June 1971), p. 137.
- Katardjiev's foreword to Васил Ивановски. Зошто ние, Македонците, сме одделна нација?, Скопје, 1995, pp. 49–56. (Vasil Ivanovski, Why We Macedonians Are a Separate Nation?, Skopje, 1995)
- Palmer, S. and R. King Yugoslav Communism and the Macedonian Question, Archon Books (June 1971), p. 137.
- Димитър Гоцев. НОВАТА НАЦИОНАЛНО-ОСВОБОДИТЕЛНА БОРБА ВЪВ ВАРДАРСКА МАКЕДОНИЯ. Македонски научен институт, София, 1998.
- Keith Brown. The Past in Question: Modern Macedonia and the Uncertainties of Nation, Princeton University Press (2003)

== Sources ==
- Пандев, К. "Устави и правилници на ВМОРО преди Илинденско-Преображенското въстание", Исторически преглед, 1969, кн. I, стр. 68–80. (in Bulgarian)
- Пандев, К. "Устави и правилници на ВМОРО преди Илинденско-Преображенското въстание", Извeстия на Института за история, т. 21, 1970, стр. 249–257. (in Bulgarian)
- Битоски, Крсте, сп. "Македонско Време", Скопје – март 1997, quoting: Quoting: Public Record Office – Foreign Office 78/4951 Turkey (Bulgaria), From Elliot, 1898, Устав на ТМОРО. S. 1. published in Документи за борбата на македонскиот народ за самостојност и за национална држава, Скопје, Универзитет "Кирил и Методиј": Факултет за филозофско-историски науки, 1981, pp 331 – 333. (in Macedonian)
- Hugh Pouton Who Are the Macedonians?, C. Hurst & Co, 2000. p. 53. ISBN 1-85065-534-0
- Fikret Adanir, Die Makedonische Frage: ihre entestehung und etwicklung bis 1908., Wiessbaden 1979, p. 112.
- Duncan Perry The Politics of Terror: The Macedonian Liberation Movements, 1893–1903 , Durham, Duke University Press, 1988. pp. 40–41, 210 n. 10.
- Христо Татарчев, "Вътрешната македоно-одринска революционна организация като митологична и реална същност", София, 1995. (in Bulgarian)
- Dimitar Vlahov, Memoirs, 2nd edition, Slovo publishing, Skopje, 2003, ISBN 9989-103-22-4. (in Macedonian)
- Series of memoirs, published by Macedonian Scientific Institute in Sofia during the interwar period in several volumes: Slaveiko Arsov, Pando Klyashev, Ivan Popov, Smile Voidanov, Deyan Dimitrov, Nikola Mitrev, Luka Dzherov, Georgi Pop Hristov, Angel Andreev, Georgi Papanchev, Lazar Dimitrov, Damyan Gruev, Boris Sarafov, Ivan Garvanov, Yane Sandanski, Chernyo Peev, Sava Mihailov, Hristo Kuslev, Ivan Anastasov Gyrcheto, Petyr Hr. Yurukov, Nikola Pushkarov], Macedonian translations, published by Kultura, Skopje, in 2 volumes, ISBN 9989-32-022-5 and ISBN 9989-32-077-2
- Георги Баждаров, "Моите спомени", издание на Институт "България – Македония", София, 2001. In English: Georgi Bazhdarov, My memoirs, published by Institute Bulgaria-Macedonia, Sofia, 2001.
- Nikola Kirov Majski, Pages from my life, Kultura, Skopje. (in Macedonian)
- Albert Londres, Les Comitadjis (Le terrorisme dans les Balkans), Kultura, Skopje, ISBN 9989-32-067-5 (original edition: Arlea, Paris, 1992).
- Albert Sonnichsen, Confessions of a Macedonian Bandit: A Californian in the Balkan Wars, The Narrative Press, ISBN 1-58976-237-1. Also here Confessions, Ch. XXIV (in English), and Macedonian translation.
- Fikret Adanir, Die Makedonische Frage, Wiesbaden, 1979.
- Константин Пандев, "Национално-освободителното движение в Македония и Одринско", София, 1979.
- Ivo Banac, "The Macedoine", pp. 307–328 in of The National Question in Yugoslavia. Origins, History, Politics, Cornell University Press, 1984.
- H. N. Brailsford, Macedonia: its races and their future, Methuen & Co., London, 1906 (Brailsford's photos)
- Христо Силянов, "Освободителнитe борби на Македония", том I и II, изд. на Илинденската Организация, София, 1933 и 1943, also volume I
- Любомиръ Милетичъ, "Разорението на тракийските българи презъ 1913 година", Българска Академия на Науките, София, Държавна Печатница, 1918 г.,
- "Македония. История и политическа съдба", колектив на МНИ под редакцията на проф. Петър Петров, том I, II и III, издателство "Знание", София, 1998.
- "Македония – проблемы истории и культуры", Институт славяноведения, Российская Академия Наук, Москва, 1999 (includes Р. П. Гришина, "Формирование взгляда на македонский вопрос в большевистской Москве 1922–1924 гг."), the complete symposium
- Никола Петров, "Кои беа партизаните во Македонија", Скопje, 1998. (in Macedonian)
- Palmer, S. and R. King, Yugoslav Communism and the Macedonian Question, Archon Books, 1971.
- Добрин Мичев, "Българското нацинално дело в югозападна Македония (1941–1944 г.)", "Македонски Преглед", 1, 1998. (in Bulgarian)
- Keith Brown, The Past in Question: Modern Macedonia and the Uncertainties of Nation, Princeton University Press, 2003.
- Pisarri (2011). "Suppressing Toplica Uprising: VMRO as Leading Force of Repression". Vojnoistorijski Glasnik (in Serbian) (2). Institut za strategijska istraživanja: 28–49.
