= Ivan Angov =

Bulgarian teacher and revolutionary

- Born: 12 February 1882; Petrich, Ottoman Empire (now Bulgaria)
- Died: 30 December 1937 (aged 55); Sofia, Bulgaria
- Organization: IMARO

Ivan Todorov Angov was a Bulgarian teacher and a revolutionary, a worker of the Internal Macedonian-Adrianople Revolutionary Organization (IMARO).

Ivan Angov was born in Petrich in 1882. After he finished the Bulgarian Pedagogical School in Serres in 1900, he founded a school in the village of Smolari in which he worked as a teacher. He was imprisoned because he got into a conflict with the authorities of the Constantinople Patriarchate. His father and brother were already members of the IMARO when he joined the revolutionary organization in 1901. He was appointed a courier by the organization. From 1905 to 1908 he was imprisoned in Edikule, a prison in Thessaloniki.

In October 1912 he became a member of the regional management body of the liberated Petrich and in 1914 he became a secretary and tax-collector of the Petrich municipality. He was elected a member of the city’s municipality council a number of times. In 1924, Angov was among the founders of the tobacco cooperation “Fortress of Samoil”, together with Iliya Bizhev and others. In 1925 he participated in the foundation of the water syndicate “Strumeshnitsa”. After 1925, he worked as a teacher in Dolene and Baskaltsi.

Angov died in Sofia in 1937.
