= Bogoslov =

Village in Kyustendil, Bulgaria; notable for Velin Alaykov

Coordinates: 42°15′N 22°41′E

Bogoslov is a village in Kyustendil Municipality, Kyustendil Province, Bulgaria. Notable people include Velin Alaykov.
