= Ivan Anastasov =

Voivode Ivan Anastasov
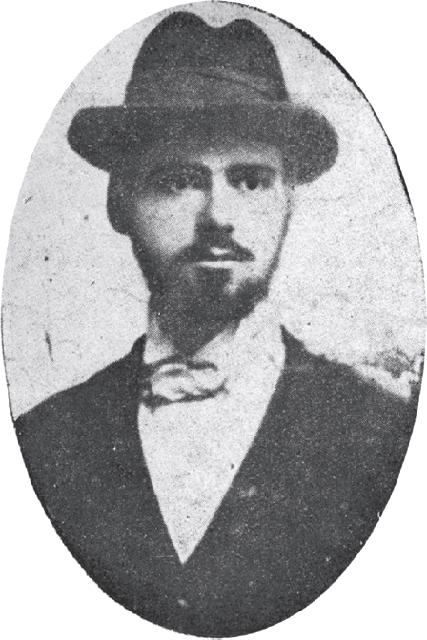
- A portrait of Ivan Anastasov
- Native name: Иван Анастасов; Ιωάννης Αναστασόπουλος
- Nicknames: Yianko; Янко; The little Greek; Гърчето
- Born: c. 1880; Melnik, Salonika Vilayet, Ottoman Empire (now Bulgaria)
- Died: 1904 Sanjak of Drama, Ottoman Empire (now Greece)
- Allegiance: IMRO
- Conflicts: Macedonian Struggle †; Ilinden-Preobrazhenie Uprising
- Education: Bulgarian Pedagogical School of Serres
- Other work: Teacher

Ivan Anastasov (Bulgarian: Иван Анастасов) was a Greek revolutionary, a worker of the Internal Macedonian-Adrianople Revolutionary Organization (IMARO). He was nicknamed Grcheto (the little Greek), because of his ethnic Greek heritage.

== Biography ==
Ivan Anastasov was born in 1880 in town of Melnik, in today's Blagoevgrad Province, Bulgaria (then part of the Ottoman Empire). He studied in the Greek and Bulgarian schools in his town and also in the Bulgarian Pedagogical School in Serres, where he finished two years of schooling. In 1899 he became a teacher of the Bulgarian Exarchate in the village of Igumenets, Petrich region.

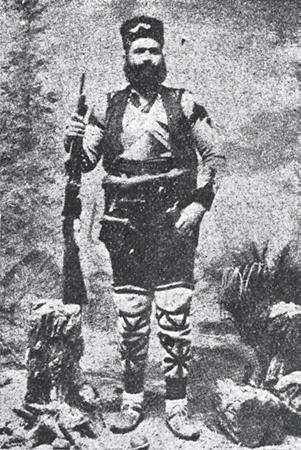
Ivan Anastasov c. 1903

He joined the revolutionary organisation IMARO in 1900. At first, he was a member of the revolutionary band of Kostadin Zelnikov. In November 1900 he met Gotse Delchev in the village of Monospitovo. Anastasov accompanied Delchev during his tours in Eastern Macedonia. He worked as a revolutionary agitator in the regions of Petrich, Poroy (Poroia), Demir Hisar and Strumica. He was a fighter in the bands of Mihail Poroyliyata and Iliya Karchovaliyata as well as a secretary in the band of Georgi Radev. He escaped to Bulgaria for nine months and afterwards he again entered Macedonia and joined the band of Gotse Delchev. During the Ilinden-Preobrazhenie Uprising he led a group of fighters in the region of Drama, which was destroyed in a battle near the village of Kalapot (today Panorama). He then again escaped to Bulgaria, where the biographer Lyubomir Miletich recorded his memoirs.

At the beginning of 1904, he headed to the region of Drama with a band of 14 fighters, but he was ambushed on the Bulgarian-Turkish border and was killed together with all other members of the band.
