= Hristo Batandzhiev =

Bulgarian revolutionary

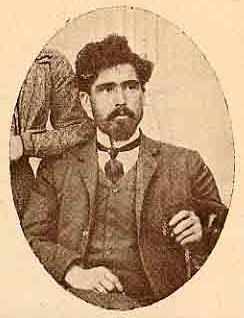
- Born: 1869; Gyumendzhe, Ottoman Empire
- Died: 18 June 1913 (aged 43–44); Aegean Sea

Hristo Batandzhiev (Bulgarian: Христо Батанджиев, Macedonian: Христо Батанџиев; 1869 – 18 June 1913) was a Bulgarian teacher, revolutionary, and one of the founders of the Internal Macedonian Revolutionary Organization.

== Life ==
Batandzhiev was born in Gyumendzhe, Ottoman Empire (present-day Goumenissa, Greece). He studied in Gyumendzhe and Thessaloniki. Batandzhiev was a teacher in the Bulgarian Exarchate school in Thessaloniki and secretary of the Bulgarian Bishopric in the city. On 23 October 1893, he was one of the founders of the Internal Macedonian Revolutionary Organization (IMRO). Batandzhiev became a member of the Central Committee of IMRO without portfolio. After the Young Turk Revolution from 1908, he was an active member of the Bulgarian Constitutional Clubs Party. In 1909, he married Ekaterina Periklieva, a teacher at the Bulgarian Girls' High School of Thessaloniki. After the outbreak of the Second Balkan War, Greek soldiers arrested him in Thessaloniki. He was drowned by Greek soldiers on 18 June 1913 in Aegean Sea, being killed together with Archimandrite Eulogius, a leader of the Bulgarian Exarchist community in Thessaloniki.

His son, Ivan Batandzhiev, was a Bulgarian sports figure, one of the founders of the Bulgarian Football Championship, chairman of the Bulgarian Football Union and trainer of the Bulgaria national football team. His grandson with the same name was a Bulgarian geologist.

== Sources ==
- Encyclopedia "Bulgaria", vol. 1, Publishing House of the Bulgarian Academy of Sciences, Sofia, 1978 (in Bulgarian): Енциклопедия България, том 1, Издателство на БАН, София, 1978).
