= Bulgarian Men's High School of Thessaloniki =

Coordinates: 40.6367°N 22.9492°E

- Bulgarian: Солунска българска мъжка гимназия „Св. св. Кирил и Методий“
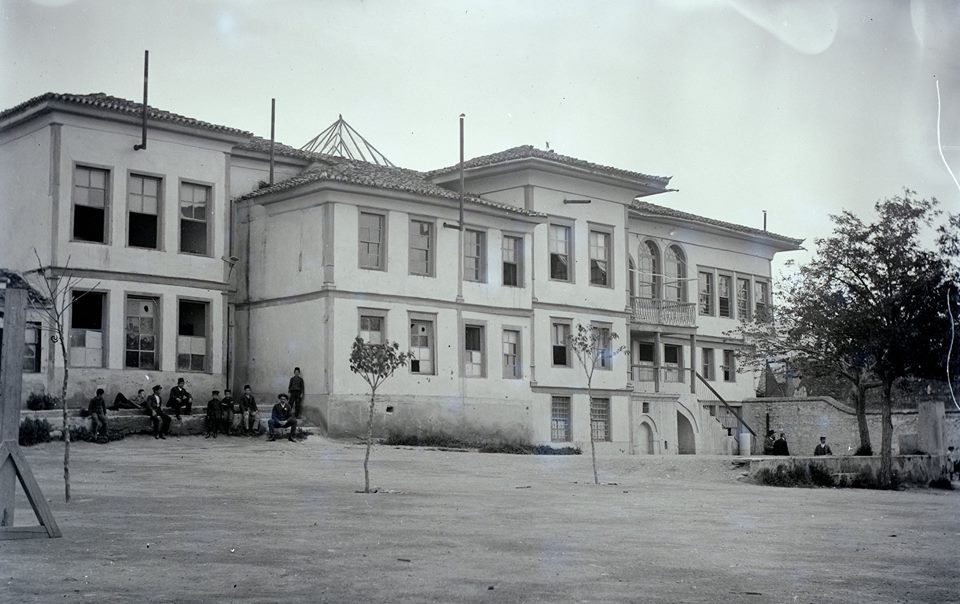

Information
- Established: 1880
- Closed: 1913

The Sts. Cyril and Methodius Bulgarian Men's High School of Thessaloniki (Bulgarian: Солунска българска мъжка гимназия „Св. св. Кирил и Методий“, Solunska balgarska mazhka gimnazia „Sv. sv. Kiril i Metodiy“) was the first Bulgarian high school in Macedonia. One of the most influential Bulgarian educational centres in Macedonia, it was founded in autumn 1880 in Ottoman Thessaloniki (today in Greece) and existed until 1913.

== Foundation ==
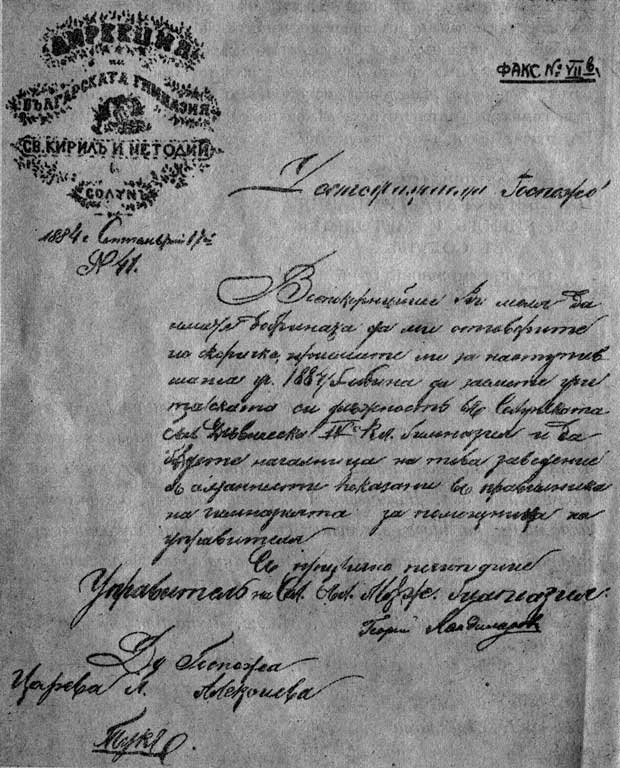
Document issued by the administration of the school in 1884. The logo of the school and its name are visible as written: Bulgarian school "Sts. Cyril and Methodius" - Thessaloniki.

The first Bulgarian school in Thessaloniki was founded in 1871 next to the church of Agios Athanasios. Following the April Uprising of 1876, the Russo-Turkish War (1877–1878), the Kresna–Razlog uprising and other events, the Bulgarian educational cause in Macedonia had to live through a number of blows. Exploiting anti-Bulgarian sentiment among government officials, Greek bishops succeeded in shutting down a lot of Bulgarian schools and in re-introducing the Greek language to Bulgarian churches in the region. As a result, part of the Bulgarian intelligentsia emigrated to the Principality of Bulgaria and the province of Eastern Rumelia. They did, however, manage to continue their work, supported by local municipalities, the Bulgarian Exarchate, and the newly created Bulgarian state. The situation in Thessaloniki remained relatively calm, given the hard situation elsewhere. The presence of foreign consuls and representations was putting some limitations on the Turkish regime. This fact is asserted by some scholars as the main reason behind the opening of a Bulgarian secondary school in Macedonia resembling the ones in Sofia and Plovdiv. In 1880 the Ottoman Empire adopted an Act on Vilaets which limited Greek bishops’ control over Bulgarian churches. Taking advantage of these developments, revivalist Kuzman Shapkarev prepared a whole plan for Bulgarian education in Macedonia, centred on the region's capital – Thessaloniki. The city ought to host one men's and one girls’ gymnasium with boarding schools attached to each. Prior to their opening, there was a total of 667 Bulgarian basic schools in Macedonia with 949 teachers and 36,623 students. The main obstacle before Shapkarev's plan was the Exarchate's objection to Thessaloniki hosting the gymnasiums. Dragan Tsankov, who favored the idea in principle, proposed another town situated in Central Macedonia and inhabited by a purely Bulgarian population to host the schools. Despite these differences, the Exarchate backed up the initiative and the Sts. Cyril and Methodius Bulgarian Men's High School of Thessaloniki officially opened doors in the autumn of 1880 with the support of the local Bulgarian community and the Exarchate.

== Further development ==
The high school began holding classes in 1880 in a building in the same neighborhood. In 1910, the school had eight classrooms, twelve teachers, and 133 students. Following the Balkan Wars, in 1913 the high school was moved to the town Gorna Dzhumaya in Pirin Macedonia, then ceded to Bulgaria, where it exists today as "Sts. Cyril and Methodius National Humanitarian High School".

Among the initiators, principals and teachers at the high school were noted Bulgarian intellectuals, scientists, and public figures such as Kuzman Shapkarev, Vasil Kanchov, Grigor Parlichev, and Konstantin Velichkov. The school's graduates include Gotse Delchev, Dame Gruev, Todor Aleksandrov, Andrey Lyapchev, Ivan Mihaylov, Petar Darvingov, Anton Ketskarov and other key figures of the Bulgarian revolutionary movement and politics of the early 20th century.

== Honours ==
Solun Glacier on Loubet Coast in Graham Land, Antarctica is named "after the Bulgarian High School of Solun (Thessaloniki), a major Bulgarian education centre during the late 19th and early 20th century; presently located in Blagoevgrad, Southwestern Bulgaria".

On 5 March 2014 the Thessaloniki Mayor Yiannis Boutaris unveiled a commemorative plaque at the site of the high school, 99 Olymbou St., together with Petar Stoyanovich, Bulgarian Minister of Culture.

== See also ==
- Bulgarian Men's High School of Adrianople
- Education in the Ottoman Empire
- Bulgarian High School of Bolgrad
- Bulgarian Girls' High School of Thessaloniki
