= Bitola revolutionary district =

- Битолски революционен окръг
- Leaders: Pere Toshev; Dame Gruev; Anastas Lozanchev; Gyorche Petrov; Boris Sarafov
- Dates active: Established 1894
- Headquarters: Bitola
- Part of: Internal Macedonian-Adrianople Revolutionary Organization

The Bitola revolutionary district (Bulgarian: Битолски революционен окръг; Macedonian: Битолски револуционерен округ) was an organizational grouping of the Internal Macedonian-Adrianople Revolutionary Organization. Leaders of the group were Pere Toshev, Dame Gruev, Anastas Lozanchev, Gyorche Petrov and Boris Sarafov. This rebel group was active in western parts of Greek Macedonia and Vardar Macedonia with headquarters in Bitola.

== History ==
The district was established in 1894 in the congress of the Internal Macedonian-Adrianople Revolutionary Organization (IMARO) in Resen, along with the Skopje revolutionary district and the Salonica revolutionary district. Among the leaders of the district were Pere Toshev, Dame Gruev, Anastas Lozanchev, Gyorche Petrov and Boris Sarafov.

The Smilevo congress took place in the district between 2 and 7 May 1903, where it was agreed to start an uprising during the summer. The district was the first to revolt in the Ilinden Uprising in 1903. In the beginning of 1904, the Bitola regional committee ordered voivodes of southern Macedonia to forcibly convert the Patriarchist villages to the Bulgarian Exarchate. Around 40 villages were forcibly converted. This measure was opposed by Petrov, but the opposition was overruled. Along with the Skopje district, it pursued a closer cooperation with the Bulgarian government.
