= Skopje revolutionary district =

- Скопски революционен окръг
- Leaders: Petar Poparsov; Nikola Pushkarov
- Dates active: Established 1894
- Headquarters: Skopje
- Part of: Internal Macedonian Revolutionary Organization

The Skopje revolutionary district (Bulgarian: Скопски революционен окръг; Macedonian: Скопски револуционерен округ) was an organizational grouping of the Internal Macedonian Revolutionary Organization. Among the leaders of the group were Petar Poparsov and Nikola Pushkarov. This rebel group was active in northern Vardar Macedonia with headquarters in Skopje.

== History ==
The district was established in 1894 in the congress of the Internal Macedonian Revolutionary Organization (IMRO) in Resen, along with the Bitola revolutionary district and the Salonica revolutionary district. Leaders of the district were Petar Poparsov and Nikola Pushkarov. In January 1903, the district sent a delegate to oppose an early uprising, instead advocating for a postponement of one year. However, the delegate ended up signing the decision to start an uprising, along with the rest of the delegates. The district was unprepared for the uprising. After the decision to start an uprising, Pushkarov and his associates sent a response to the Central Committee in Salonica, expressing their unhappiness with the decision because they were unready. Central Committee member Ivan Garvanov answered that they were aware that a mass uprising could not take place in the district, but they believed that terrorist actions could be carried out there, such as by sending around 500 people from Montenegro to attack Skopje, and attacking the city internally with bombs. However, no rifles or dynamites were sent. The district's leadership decided to organize one or two detachments in each region to defend the locals from the bashi-bazouks. They brought Martinka rifles from Tetovo. A detachment organized in Kratovo came to the Skopje region and began organizing the villages. To acquire weapons, Pushkarov went to Sofia, from where he returned in early July with a well-equipped detachment of 18 people and seven loads of dynamite and bombs. Several battles occurred in the district during the Ilinden Uprising.

After the uprising, the district became the stronghold of IMRO's right-wing. In January 1905, the first regional congress of the district took place near Kneževo in the Kratovo district. In the congress, it imposed minimum wages for harvesters and seasonal workers, and a minimum annual payment for permanent workers employed in chifliks. However, the next regional congress in July 1906, which was dominated by IMRO's right-wing, revised the decisions from the previous congress, by permitting the local committees to define "maximum workday, minimum pay and wage". In 1905, the district was estimated as having around 30,000 members and sent delegates to IMRO's Rila congress.
