= Kneževo =

Kneževo may refer to:

- Kneževo, Bosnia and Herzegovina, a town and municipality in Bosnia and Herzegovina
- Kneževo (Brus), a village in Serbia
- Kneževo, Croatia, a village near Popovac, Croatia
- Kneževo, North Macedonia, a village near Kratovo, North Macedonia
