= Anastas Lozanchev =

Bulgarian revolutionary (1870–1945)

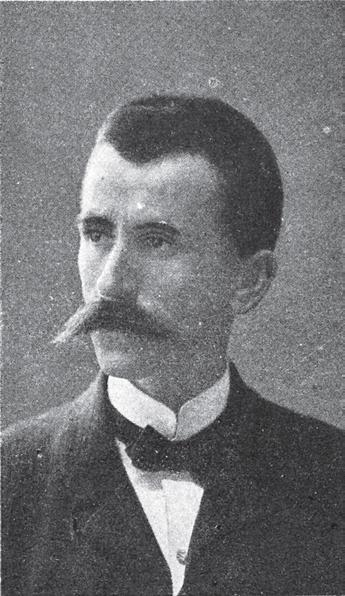
- Born: 8 April 1870; Bitola, Ottoman Empire
- Died: 8 November 1945 (aged 75); Sofia, Bulgaria
- Citizenship: Ottoman/Bulgarian
- Occupations: Photographer, teacher, sewist
- Organization(s): Internal Macedonian Revolutionary Organization; Ilinden

Signature
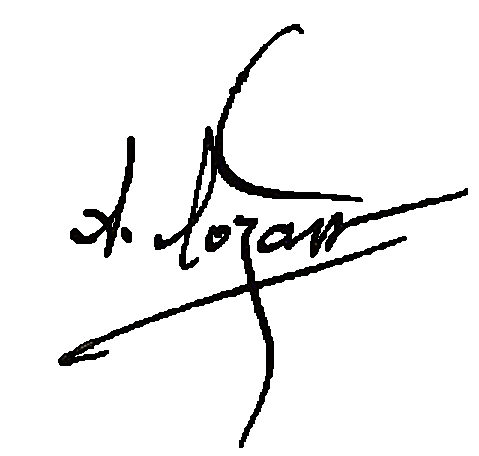

Anastas (Atanas) Dimev Lozanchev (Bulgarian and Macedonian: Анастас Димев Лозанчев, romanized: Anastas Dimev Lozančev; 8 April 1870 – 8 November 1945) was a Macedonian Bulgarian teacher, revolutionary and a member of the Internal Macedonian Revolutionary Organization (IMRO). He was a member of the Bitola regional committee and General Staff for the Ilinden Uprising.

== Life ==
Anastas Lozanchev was born in Bitola, Ottoman Empire (modern North Macedonia), on 8 April 1870. His parents were Dime and Ancha Lozanchevi. His father engaged in innkeeping, trade and agriculture. He finished his elementary education in his native city. Afterwards, he continued his education in Bulgarian Men's High School of Thessaloniki. After studying in Thessaloniki, he returned to Bitola and helped his father in his business. He also learned French, using two language versions of the Bible - one in French and the other in Bulgarian. In 1887, he went to Sofia and learned photography. After acquiring a camera in Belgrade, he opened his own photographic studio named Lozanchev Photography in Bitola in 1889. In 1891/1892, he became a teacher in Smilevo. In the next school year, he was transferred to work in Mogila. After completing the year, he returned to photography. At the age of 18, he took up hunting as a hobby. In the 1890s, he became a member of the Bitola regional committee. When Pere Toshev served as a president of the Bitola committee in 1894, he was his secretary. After the death of his father, he took over the care for his family and its business.

On 22 January 1900, he married Paraskeva Biolcheva. With the assistance of Gotse Delchev, who talked with Dame Gruev while he was imprisoned after the murder of the priest Stavre by the Organization, Lozanchev became the president of Bitola's committee in 1901. In January 1903, he attended IMRO's congress in Thessaloniki, without consulting with anyone from his committee, the other committees or any voivode. He was one of the main initiators to start an uprising in 1903. Along with Ivan Garvanov, he made the arguments that an uprising would result in greater rights for the people, the Bulgarian army would intervene if the uprising would last for two weeks, the Supremists were preparing new provocations, the Organization could be overtaken by events, frequent blockades, searches and arrests by the Ottoman authorities would gradually overpower the Organization, the people would lose hope and emigrate if the uprising were to be delayed. The proposal to start an uprising was accepted by all present delegates. During the Smilevo congress in May 1903, he was criticized for participating in the congress in January without consulting the others. He was elected as a member of the General Staff of the uprising, along with Boris Sarafov and Dame Gruev. In May 1903, he surveyed the regions of Demir Hisar, Kruševo and Resen along with Gruev, Sarafov and Toshev. On 2 August, with the beginning of the uprising, he participated in the fighting for Smilevo along with the other two members of the General Staff. As the uprising was being suppressed by the Ottomans, on 22 September, along with the other two members of the General Staff, he sent a letter to the Bulgarian government, asking for military intervention due to "the critical and terrible situation" in which "the Bulgarian population in the Bitola vilayet found itself after the devastation and atrocities committed by the Turkish armies and the Bashibozuks, and considering that these devastations and atrocities are systematically continuing and it is impossible to see how far they will go". At the end of October, he returned to Bitola.

In 1904, he met with Albanian chieftain Marka Gjoni in Mirdita, with whom he discussed the idea of a joint struggle against the Turks, but Gjoni did not accept the proposal. He went to Cetinje after, meeting with Bulgarian diplomat Dimitar Rizov, who gave him a Bulgarian passport under a fake name. In the same year, he settled in Sofia. His uncle provided for him until he started working as a sewist. After returning to Macedonia, during the Balkan Wars, he met Bulgarian politician Andrey Lyapchev in his home in Bitola, whom he warned that the Serbs will not respect the treaty for the partition of Macedonia and said that Bitola belongs to Bulgaria. After the wars, he returned to Sofia with his family. He supported the entry of Bulgaria in World War I and enlisted as a volunteer. However, due to a nervous breakdown, he was put in the reserve in 1915. During the war, he was part of the Knyazhevo reserve regiment, department of the military court in Sofia and worked as an accountant in a hospital. In December 1917, he was one of the signatories of a protest document to the Netherlands Scandinavian Committee, where it was written that Macedonia was and will be part of the Bulgarian lands, ethnically and politically. He supported a declaration by the Kičevo brotherhood in Bulgaria about the autonomy of Macedonia under the protectorate of the Great Powers, if unification with Bulgaria is not possible. At the end of November 1918, he was elected as a representative of the Bitola brotherhood. In a meeting of the executive committee of Macedonian brotherhoods, due to the political situation and its ethnic character, he argued that autonomy of Macedonia was the most suitable solution, for which he was accused of being a traitor. As part of the Provisional representation of the former United Internal Revolutionary Organization, together with its members as Gyorche Petrov, Pavel Hristov, Petar Atsev, etc., he signed an "Appeal to the Macedonian population and to the émigré population in Bulgaria". There was a call for an independent Macedonia.

In Sofia, he opened a workshop for sewing. In 1930, he told his recollections about his life to Boyan Mirchev, but requested the publication of his memoirs after his death. In February 1936, after the disbandment of IMRO in 1934, he wrote an expanded version of his memoirs. In the same year, he also donated a sample of his texts to the Ilinden Organization and the Macedonian Scientific Institute. In his March 1937 article in Illustration Ilinden, he published the article "Why I was for an uprising", where he justified his decision to support the uprising. During World War II, he accepted the occupation of Vardar Macedonia by Bulgaria as a "liberation" under "mother Bulgaria". He participated in the organization Ilinden and the Ilinden Uprising commemorations organized by the Bulgarian authorities in Vardar Macedonia during the war. He lived in Bankya until 1944, when he moved to the village of Moshino, today a quarter of Pernik. Lozanchev published the memoir Autonomous Macedonia in 1945. After the creation of a Democratic Federal Macedonia under Democratic Federal Yugoslavia, he stated in a text written on 7 September 1945:

"I am for Macedonia to be a member of a true Democratic Federative Yugoslavia as the first stage, and for the second stage I do not consider Macedonia's accession to Bulgaria, as was once thought, but rather something the opposite – the accession of Bulgaria to a complete true Democratic Federative Yugoslavia, and in the third stage, that Yugoslavia should flow into the great sea of the USSR. If that happens, then we will have a real union of all Slavic peoples. It is almost undeniable that Poland has found its place, and this should also happen with Czechoslovakia."

He self-identified as a Macedonian Bulgarian, writing: "Not only do I not approve, but I also protest against that call against everything Bulgarian. Our sons, like His Excellency Mr. Lazar Kolishevski.... and my friend Dimitar Vlahov cannot teach us that we are only Macedonians, not Macedonian Bulgarians. Personally, I have been a Bulgarian since before there was a Bulgarian Exarchate and a Bulgarian state." He died on 8 November in Sofia in the same year.

== Sources ==
- Andonovska, Lenče (2007). Значајни личности за Битола [Significant people for Bitola]. Bitola: НУУБ „Св. Климент Охридски“ – Битола. p. 118. ISBN 978-9989-2783-0-3.
- Bechev, Dimitar (2009). Historical Dictionary of the Republic of Macedonia. Scarecrow Press. ISBN 0-8108-6295-6.
- Gjorgjiev, Vančo (2014). Анастас Лозанчев [Anastas Lozančev] (in Macedonian). Филозофски факултет, Скопје.
- Kardjilov, Peter (2020). The Cinematographic Activities of Charles Rider Noble and John Mackenzie in the Balkans (Volume Two). Cambridge Scholars Publishing. ISBN 9781527558748.
- MacDermott, Mercia (1988). For Freedom and Perfection: The Life of Yané Sandansky. London: Journeyman Press. ISBN 978-1-85172-014-9.
- Nikolov, Toma (1989). "5. Революционното дело в Битоля и борбите с пропагандите". Спомени от моето минало. Sofia: Изд. на Отеч. фронт.
- Perry, Duncan (1988). The Politics of Terror: The Macedonian Liberation Movements, 1893-1903. Duke University Press. ISBN 9780822308133.
- Paleshutski, Kostadin (1993). Македонското освободително движение след Първата световна война (1918 – 1924) (in Bulgarian). Sofia: Publishing House of Bulgarian Academy of Sciences. ISBN 9789544302306.
- Ristovski, Blaže (2009). Makedonska enciklopedija [Macedonian Encyclopedia] (in Macedonian). MANU.
