= Pere Toshev =

Macedonian Bulgarian revolutionary and teacher

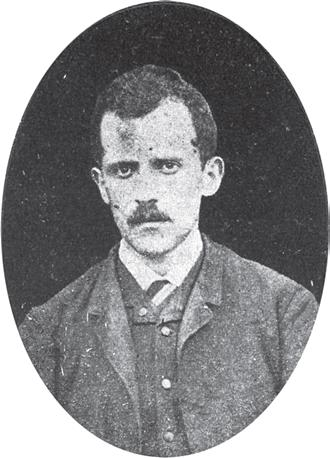
- Macedonian Bulgarian revolutionary
- Born: 1865; Prilep, Ottoman Empire
- Died: May 4, 1912 (aged 46–47); Drenovo, Ottoman Empire

Petar (Pere) Naumov Toshev (Bulgarian: Петър (Пере) Наумов Тошев, Macedonian: Петар (Пере) Наумов Тошев; 1865–1912) was a Bulgarian teacher and revolutionary and an activist of the Internal Macedonian-Adrianople Revolutionary Organization. In North Macedonia he is considered an ethnic Macedonian revolutionary.

== Early life ==
Toshev was born in the town of Prilep, then part of the Ottoman Empire. He studied at the Bulgarian Exarchate's school in Prilep and the Bulgarian Men's High School of Thessaloniki. Later Pere attended the Gymnazium in Plovdiv, capital of the recently created Eastern Rumelia. Here he joined the Bulgarian Secret Central Revolutionary Committee founded in 1885. The original purpose of the committee was to gain autonomy for the region of Macedonia (then called Western Rumelia), but it played an important role in the organization of the Unification of Bulgaria and Eastern Rumelia. During the Serbo-Bulgarian War of 1885, he joined the Bulgarian Army as a volunteer. During 1885–1890 Pere Toshev and Andrey Lyapchev organised a series of secret meetings in the villages around Plovdiv. They decided to organize a new Macedonian-Adrianople liberation organization. In 1890, they were on an intelligence touring through Macedonia.

== Teacher and activist ==
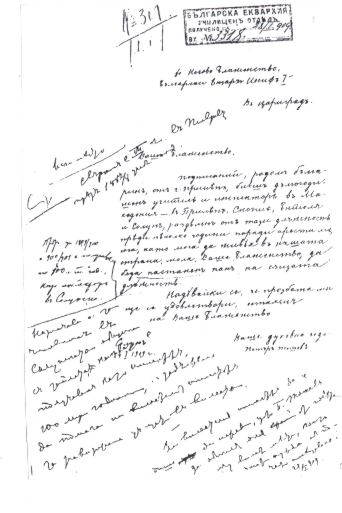
Tosev's plea for appointing a Bulgarian teacher sent to Joseph I of Bulgaria in 1901.

In the period 1892–1893, Toshev worked as a Bulgarian Exarchate teacher together with Dame Gruev in Macedonia. After joining the Internal Macedonian-Adrianople Revolutionary Organization (IMARO), he became an activist. In 1900, Toshev conducted the ceremony inducting the members of the Central Committee of the Bulgarian Secret Revolutionary Brotherhood, including Ivan Garvanov into the IMARO. In 1901, Pere was exiled by the Ottoman authorities in Asia Minor. During the Ilinden Uprising in 1903, he led a detachment in the region of Mariovo. He was a delegate at the Prilep Congress of IMARO in 1904. At the Rila Congress of IMARO in 1905 he was elected as a member of the Central Committee of the Organization. During the increase of the Serbian propaganda in Macedonia, Pere Toshev attempted to neutralize peacefully the Serbian bands in the area. After the capture of Dame Gruev by the Serbs he personally met Gligor Sokolović, and subsequently Dame Gruev was released. After Ivan Garvanov and Boris Sarafov's murder, he was briefly arrested as a suspected. After the Young Turk Revolution, Pere Toshev opposed the legalization of the Organization. Toshev and Dimo Hadzhidimov, published the newspaper "Konstitutsionna zarya", close to the Serres group of Yane Sandanski, from 1908 until 1909. During this period Toshev with Anton Strashimirov and Gyorche Petrov, also issued the newspaper "Kulturno Edinstvo" in Solun. During 1910–1911, Toshev was a school inspector of the Bulgarian schools in the Salonica revolutionary district. Toshev was killed by the Turks in Drenovo, near Kavadarci in 1912.

Anastas Lozanchev wrote about him in his account of IMARO's founding in 1894: „Pere had clearly defined ideas, with defined views on the revolutionary struggles, which no one else at that time had. He was an old revolutionary; he had participated together with other Macedonian Bulgarians... in the unification of Northern and Southern Bulgaria.“

== Sources ==
- Пере Тошев (Личност и Дело), Светозар Тошев, печатница „Кишкилов”—Асеновград, 1942 г.(Bg.)
- Пере Тошев - съвестта на Македония. Силата на документите. Цочо В. Билярски.
