= Podmočani =

Podmočani Подмочани
- Village
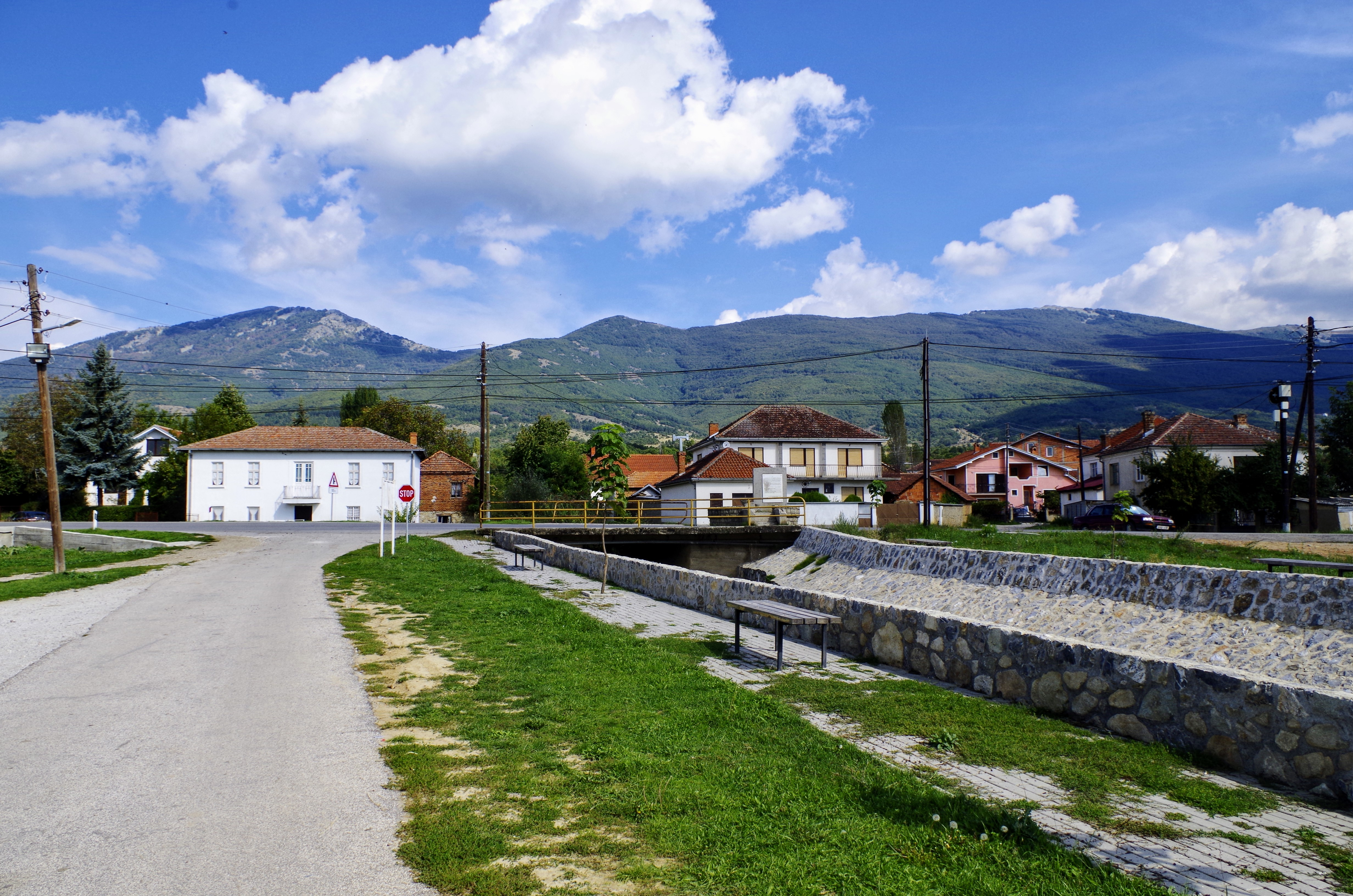
- Podmočani centre and river

- Location within North Macedonia
- Coordinates: 41°01′28″N 21°03′02″E
- Country: North Macedonia
- Region: Pelagonia
- Municipality: Resen

Population (2002)
  - Total: 306
- Time zone: UTC+1 (CET)
  - Summer (DST): UTC+2 (CEST)
- Area code: +389
- Car plates: RE

Podmočani (Macedonian: Подмочани) is a village in the Resen Municipality of the Republic of North Macedonia, north of Lake Prespa. The village is roughly 8 kilometres (5.0 mi) from the municipal centre of Resen.

== Demographics ==
According to Dimitar Mishev Brancoff, in his statistics gathered about the population of Macedonia, the Christian population of Podmočani was 688 Bulgarian Exarchists and 42 Albanians.

Podmočani is inhabited by an Orthodox Macedonian majority and during the course of the 20th century by a small Sunni Muslim Albanian minority. During the late Ottoman period, Torbeš also used to reside in Podmočani.

Podmočani has 306 residents as of the most recent national census of 2002. The population had increased to 875 in 1981, but has declined in every census since.

Ethnic group	census 1961		census 1971		census 1981		census 1991		census 1994		census 2002	
Ethnic group	Number	%	Number	%	Number	%	Number	%	Number	%	Number	%
Macedonians	685	94.4	720	97.0	818	93.5	552	97.5	338	96.6	302	98.7
Albanians	40	5.5	17	2.3	8	0.9	3	0.5	11	3.1	2	0.7
others	1	0.1	5	0.7	49	5.6	11	1.9	1	0.3	2	0.7
Total	726		742		875		566		350		306	

== People from Podmočani ==
- Lazo Globočki (1877 - 1915), Kmet (Regional Property and Dispute Adjudicator) for 11 villages with Administrative Centre in Podmočani located at current Globočki owned property at centre of village. Revolutionary Leader for regional Četa. Assassinated in 1915 by Serbian forces while fighting for the freedom of the Macedonian people and Macedonian lands.

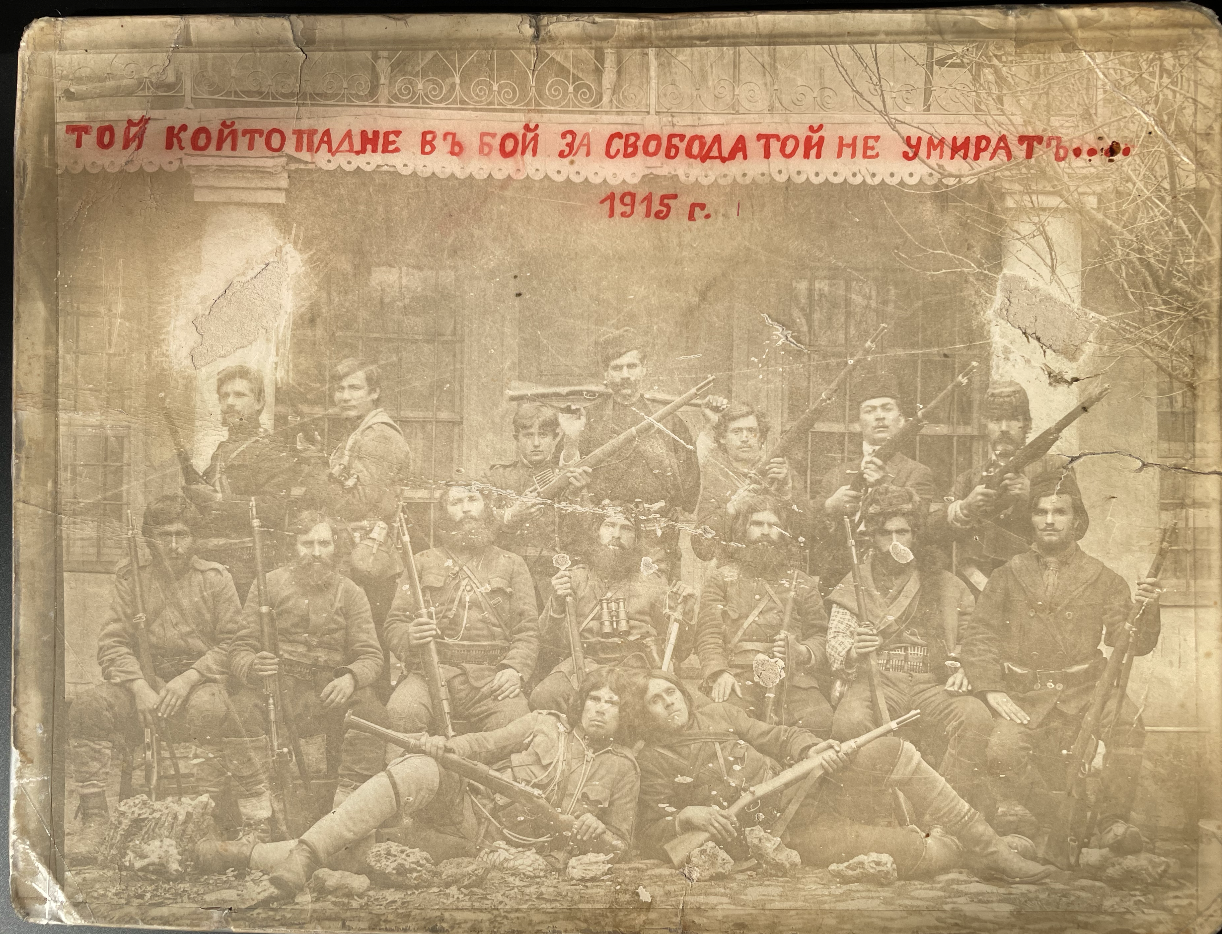
Prespanska Četa - 1915

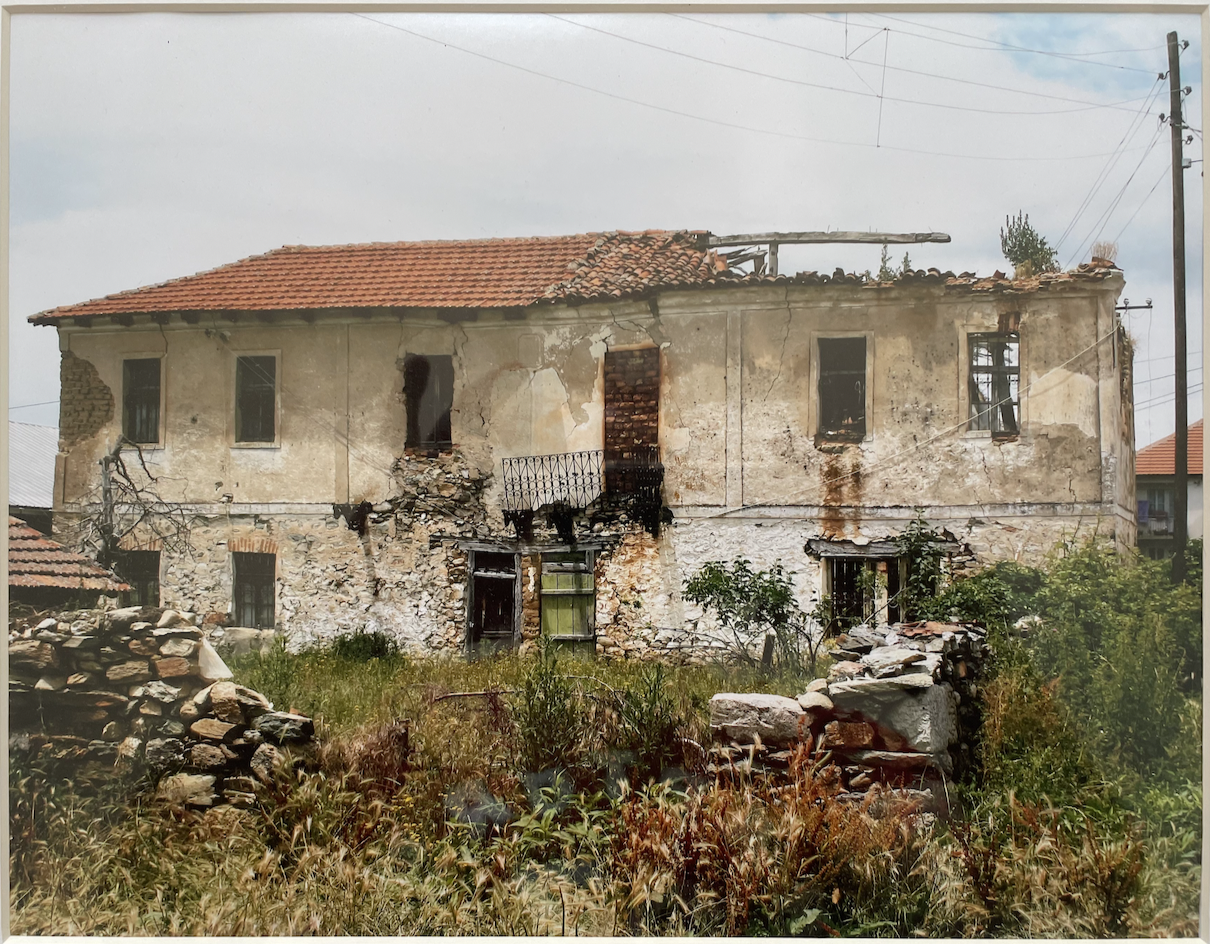
Globočki Ancestral Home

- Panaret Bregalnički (1878 - 1944), Orthodox bishop
- Atanas Gl'mbočki (1880 - 1926), revolutionary
- Eftim Kitančev (1868 - 1925), first president of the Bulgarian Olympic Committee
- Trajko Kitančev (1858 - 1895), revolutionary
- Kočo Kočovski (? - 1903), revolutionary
