= Gorna Dzhumaya Uprising =

1902 anti-Ottoman rebellion

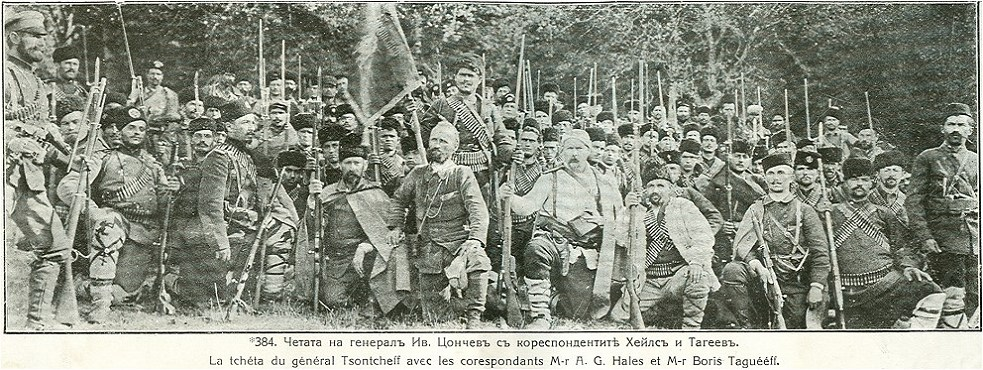
- General Ivan Tsonchev's cheta.
Date	September 23 – November 1902
Location	Pirin, Adrianople Vilayet, Ottoman Empire (now Bulgaria)
Result	Ottoman victory

Belligerents
SMAC	Ottoman Empire

Commanders and leaders
Ivan Tsonchev (WIA); Petar Darvingov	Hüseyin Hilmi Pasha

Strength
2,580 (IMRO source)	13,960 (IMRO source)

Casualties and losses
95 killed (IMRO source)	108 killed (IMRO source)
- 2,000–3,000 people (Bulgarian sources) or 200 people (Ottoman sources) fled to Bulgaria; Around 15 villages damaged and 37 people killed (Ottoman sources); 28 villages destroyed and over 100 girls and women violated (Bulgarian sources)

The Gorna Dzhumaya Uprising was an anti-Ottoman rebellion that broke out and spread throughout the Pirin region of Ottoman Macedonia in 1902.

== Background ==
The Supreme Macedonian-Adrianople Committee (SMAC) led by General Ivan Tsonchev and Stoyan Mihaylovski started to prepare the uprising in 1901. The goal of the uprising was to cause the Great Powers to intervene, which would force the Sublime Porte to implement Article 23 and Article 62 of the Treaty of Berlin, granting autonomy to Macedonia and Adrianople. In 1901, SMAC began sending detachments to Ottoman Macedonia to prepare the population for an uprising. Ivan Garvanov, who was the leader of the Internal Macedonian Revolutionary Organization (IMRO), cooperated with SMAC. SMAC was able to increase its influence in Ottoman Macedonia. Starting from 1902, detachments from Bulgaria entered the Serres sanjak. Many local committees in Macedonia strongly resisted SMAC's advances. Garvanov became convinced that an uprising in 1902 would have fatal consequences for the Macedonian revolutionary movement. Tsonchev's faction was opposed by factions by Gotse Delchev and Boris Sarafov. The Central Committee of IMRO in Salonica disapproved of Tsonchev's plans for an uprising and made preparations in northeast Macedonia to resist against Tsonchev's followers. According to IMRO's representatives, the planned uprising was hasty, unprepared, the conditions were not ripe, and the international situation was not favorable.

SMAC decided to make the Dzhumaya, Petrich, Melnik and Razlog kazas as the main places for action. SMAC wanted to involve as many districts as possible in the upcoming uprising but it encountered resistance from IMRO. By mid-September, the combined detachments of Hristo Chernopeev, Krastyo Asenov and others, numbering around 50 people, assembled to deal with the detachments of Todor Saev and Nikola Lefterov, and to discourage the population. Yane Sandanski acted on the eastern bank of the Struma against the preparations of the uprising. The presence, admonitions, and warnings of IMRO's forces had a paralyzing influence on the mood of the population. In August 1902, Bulgarian military officer Anastas Yankov went to western Macedonia to prepare the planned uprising. Yankov's attempts to raise an uprising ended in failure, due to the opposition of IMRO's local leaders. At the end of August and the beginning of September 1902, SMAC concentrated the detachments of officers Petar Darvingov, Todor Saev, Sofroni Stoyanov, Yordan Stoyanov, Hristo Sarakinov, Dimitar Dumbalakov, Anton Bozukov, Vladimir Kanazirev and Konstantin Kondov in Pirin, under the command of Ivan Tsonchev and Stefan Nikolov.

== Uprising ==
The uprising started on September 23, 1902, when around 300 men crossed the Ottoman border from Bulgaria. The rebels had their first operation in the village of Zheleznitsa. Ottoman forces engaged in battle with the rebels and set the village on fire. On the same day, battles also took place near the villages of Srbinovo and Gradevo between Ottoman forces and rebels led by the local voivode Pavle Davkov. Few locals participated, even though Tsonchev personally led the operation and despite the promises about Russian and Bulgarian intervention. This was mainly because of IMRO's disapproval of the uprising. In the village of Nedobrsko, rebels fought against Ottoman troops and retreated to the village of Bistritsa. On October 2, together with the detachments of Stoyan Nikolov, Dimitar Dumbalakov and Dimitar Zografov defeated an Ottoman camp. After the battle, the detachments headed to Melnik to raise a revolt and provide assistance to the detachments of Yordan Stoyanov and Pavel Davkov. The fighting in Dzhumaya resumed towards the end of October. From October 19 to November 3, six battles took place near the village of Bistritsa. Tsonchev took part in these battles and was wounded. In Maleshevo, the movement was thwarted by Chernopeev, who managed to attack Vase Pehlivana's detachment and wounded the voivode himself. Fighting also took place in Melnik, Petrich, Maleshevo, Strumica and Razlog.

People fled to Bulgaria. Per Bulgarian sources, 2,000-3,000 people fled, while Ottoman sources put the number as 200. Rallies were convened, which appealed to Europe and the Bulgarian government for intervention. According to Ottoman sources, around 15 villages were damaged and 37 people were killed. Per Bulgarian sources, 28 villages were destroyed and over 100 girls and women were violated by the Ottomans.

IMRO's Memoir gave the following statistics about the uprising:

- 2,580 rebels and 13,960 Ottoman soldiers took part in the fighting;
- 95 rebels were killed;
- In the battles near Kresna and Srbinovo - Gradevo, 43 rebels and 108 Ottomans were killed.
- 15 villages in the Gorna Dzhumaya and Razlog districts were subject to fires, tortures, dishonor and looting;
- 37 men and 8 women were killed;
- 304 men and 134 women were tortured;
- 111 girls and women were raped;
- 807 houses were robbed and 67 were burned;
- 29 girls and women and 2 elderly men were dishonored by Ottomans in the villages of Leshko, Padezh, Dobrinishte, Bansko and Eleshnitsa over the course of three months.

SMAC sent Mihaylovski on a tour around Europe to give news about the situation in Macedonia. In a telegram to the Great Powers, Mihaylovski said that Ottoman forces were massacring women and children. The uprising was suppressed by the Ottomans by the middle of November.

== Aftermath ==
The uprising did not result in military intervention by the Great Powers as the participants had hoped. The repression by the Ottomans resulted in the suppression of many revolutionary cells and detachments. IMRO was persecuted by the Ottoman forces after the suppression of the uprising.

In the Russian Empire and Austria-Hungary, the uprising was seen as an indication of the febrile state of Macedonia. Russian and Austro-Hungarian diplomats began considering how to stabilize the region. Russian foreign minister Vladimir Lamsdorf insisted that all connections between the governments and armies of Serbia and Bulgaria and the revolutionaries who wished to destroy Ottoman rule in Macedonia be severed. Bulgarian prime minister Stoyan Danev ordered the disbandment of the Macedonian organizations in Bulgaria and the arrest of leading activists, which was approved by the National Assembly. A reform scheme for Macedonia by the Russian and Austro-Hungarian diplomacy was drafted. The uprising accelerated the preparation of the general uprising by IMRO in Macedonia and Adrianople in 1903. Then IMRO and SMAC reached an agreement for unified revolutionary actions.

== See also ==
- Ilinden-Preobrazhenie Uprising
- Kresna-Razlog Uprising
- Razlovci uprising
- 1895 expedition of Supreme Macedonian Committee chetas
