= 1895 expedition of Supreme Macedonian Committee chetas =

1895 Expedition

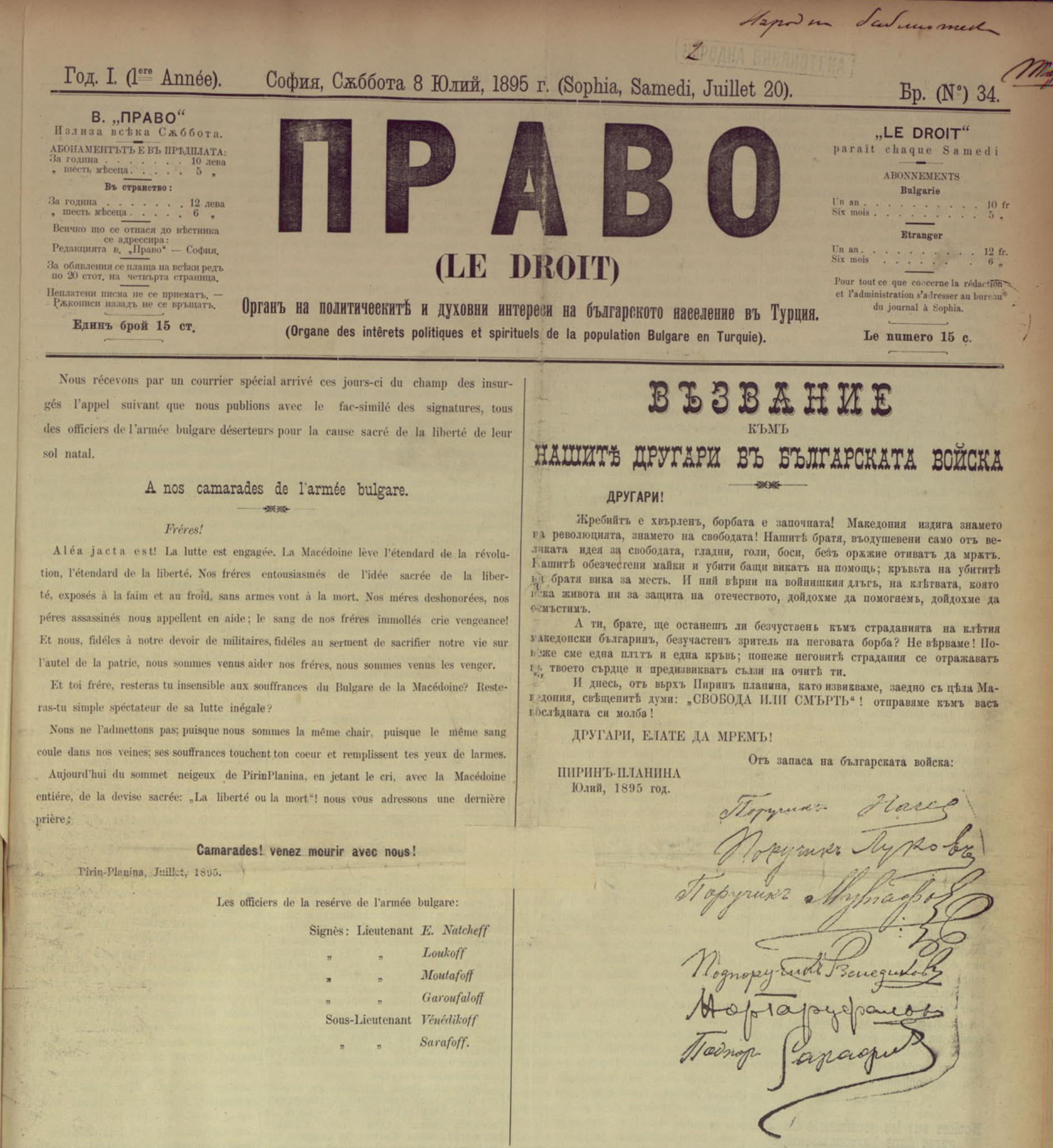
Appeal of the Supreme Committee to the Bulgarian officers about participation in the action of 1895 in newspaper "Pravo".

The Supreme Macedonian Committee chetas had an armed expedition from Bulgaria into the Ottoman-ruled Macedonia and Thrace in the period of June-August 1895. Its aim was to provoke a general uprising in the area and to draw the attention of the Great Powers to non-compliance of the Treaty of Berlin (1878), and the provided reforms in European Turkey. The Supreme Macedonian Committee invited about 40 active and reserve officers from the Bulgarian army, as well as some old vojvodes from Macedonia. Among them were Boris Sarafov, Toma Davidov, Mihail Apostolov, Naum Tiufekchiev, Yordan Venedikov, etc. The number of the rebels was about 800 people, divided into four detachments. After invading Ottoman Empire, the separate detachments headed to Strumica, Melnik and Dospat, respectively, but generally did not achieve much success. The failure of the action caused disagreements in the organization. The Ottoman government took advantage of the attack of the Pomaks populated Dospat and spread information about the atrocities in the European press. The Great Powers did not react as expected to the raising of the Macedonian question and instead of putting pressure on the Ottoman Empire, they put pressure on the Bulgarian government.

== See also ==
- Gorna Dzhumaya Uprising
- Kresna-Razlog Uprising
