= Trayko Kitanchev =

Bulgarian social figure and revolutionary (1858-1895)

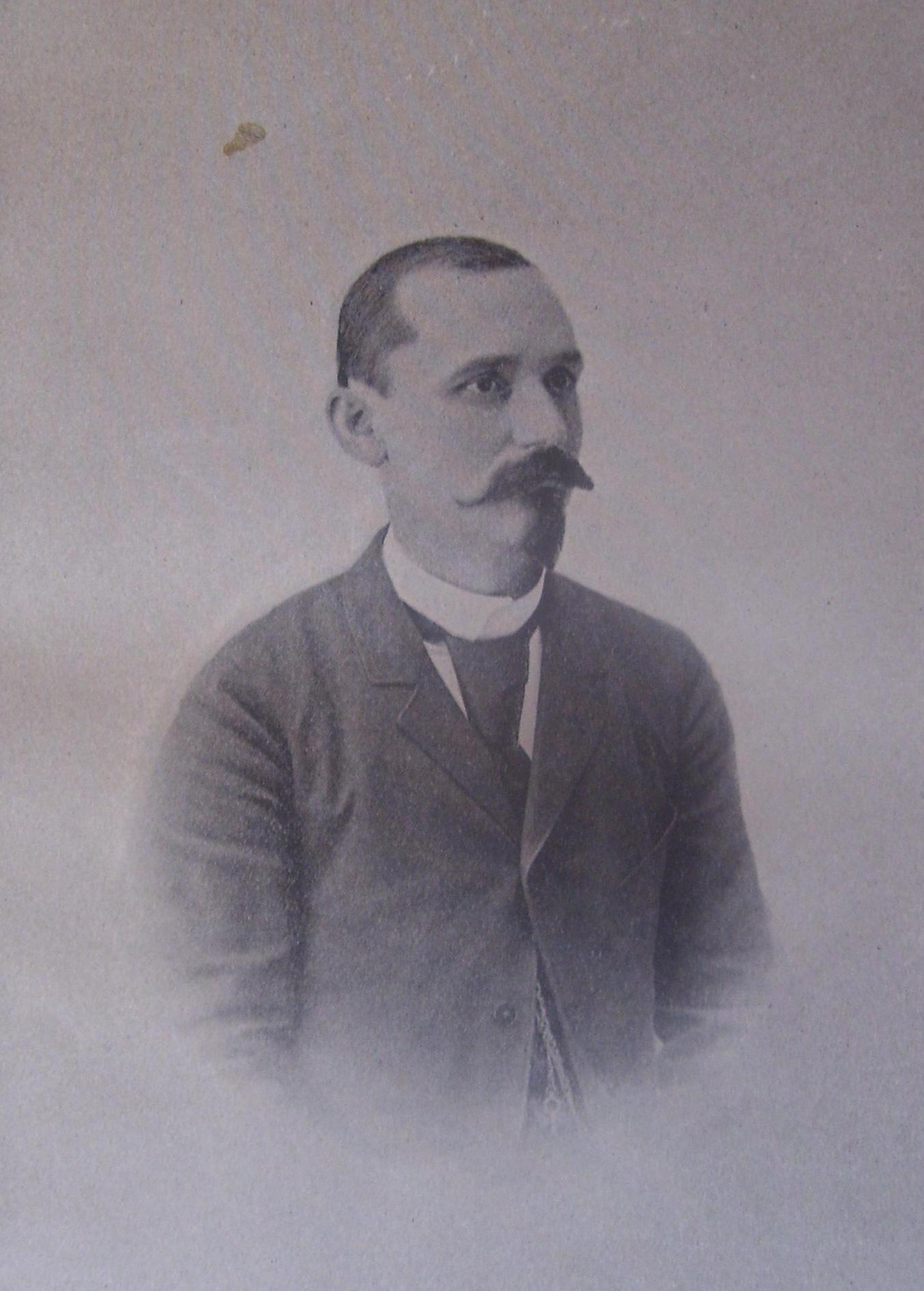
Trayko Kitanchev

Trayko Tsvetkov Kitanchev (Bulgarian: Трайко Цветков Китанчев; 1 September 1858 – 13 August 1895) was a Bulgarian teacher, translator, social figure, poet and revolutionary. In 1895, he was the first chairman of the Supreme Macedonian–Adrianopolitan Committee, a Sofia-based organization seeking the autonomy of Macedonia and southern Thrace.

Kitanchev was born in the village of Podmočani near Resen (then in Ottoman Empire, today in North Macedonia). In 1869, he was sent to the imperial capital Istanbul to study at the Bulgarian school in Phanar with the aid of Nathanael of Ohrid; in Phanar, his classmate was future Bulgarian socialist leader Dimitar Blagoev and his teacher was Petko Slaveykov.

From 1874 to 1879, Kitanchev studied at the Kiev seminary in the Russian Empire. After his graduation he briefly studied law in Moscow until 1880. In that year, he returned to the Balkans to work as a teacher at the Saints Peter and Paul Seminary in Lyaskovets and the Bulgarian Men's High School in Thessaloniki. In 1884, Trayko Kitanchev moved to Plovdiv, at the time still the capital of Eastern Rumelia; shortly afterwards he settled in Sofia, capital of the Principality of Bulgaria. In the same year, he became a full member of the Bulgarian Literary Society (today's Bulgarian Academy of Sciences).

During the Serbo-Bulgarian War of 1885, Kitanchev fought as a volunteer in the Bulgarian Army. In Sofia, Kitanchev befriended Stefan Stambolov, with whom he even shared a room for some time. During the August 1886 coup attempt aimed at overthrowing Prince Alexander Battenberg, Kitanchev accompanied Stambolov in Tarnovo and wrote the proclamation declaring the takeover illegal to Stambolov's dictation. During Stambolov's term as Prime Minister of Bulgaria (1887–1894), however, their relations worsened. After the assassination of Minister of Finance Hristo Belchev in 1891, Kitanchev was imprisoned as a potential accomplice.

After his release from prison, Kitanchev was once again teacher at the Bulgarian high school in Thessaloniki and then school inspector in Tarnovo. He became close friends with liberal leader Petko Karavelov and was elected member of parliament from the Democratic Party.

When the Supreme Macedonian-Adrianople Committee was established in March 1895, Kitanchev was elected its first chairman during the organization's constituent congress. However, the failure of the committee's armed infiltration of Ottoman Macedonia in the same year was a fatal blow to Kitanchev's health. He died in Sofia in August 1895.
