= Nikola Pushkarov =

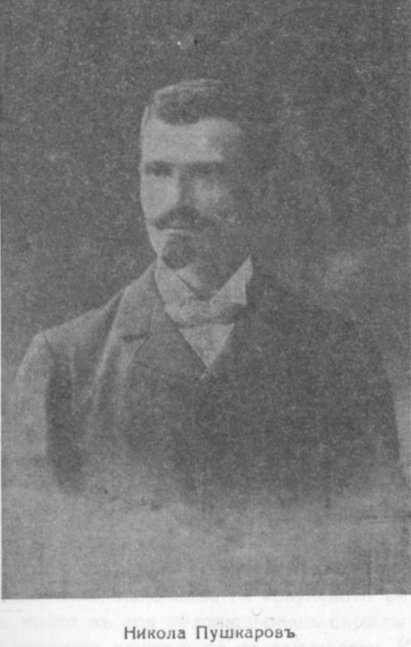
- Bulgarian revolutionary and scientist
- Born: 1874; Pirdop, Ottoman Empire (now Bulgaria)
- Died: 1943 (aged 68–69); Sofia, Bulgaria

Nikola Petkov Pushkarov (Bulgarian Никола Петков Пушкаров) (1874–1934) was the first Bulgarian soil researcher and founder of the soil science in Bulgaria. He was also an activist of the Internal Macedonian-Adrianople Revolutionary Organization.

== Early life and education ==
Nikola Pushkarov was born on December 14, 1874, in Pirdop, then in the Ottoman Empire. He graduated from elementary school in his hometown and high school in Sofia. Afterwards Pushkarov taught as a teacher in Mirkovo. In the period 1898-1901 he studied natural sciences at the Sofia University. Later he taught in the Bulgarian High School in Skopje, where he became a member of Internal Macedonian Revolutionary Organization (IMRO). In 1902 he received a task from Gotse Delchev to reinforce the Skopje Revolutionary Region. As a result, Pushkarov was elected as a president of the Skopje Revolutionary Committee of IMRO in 1902. Pushkarov was also the editor of the IMRO organizational newsletter in Skopje, "Freedom or death". As a whole the revolutionary network, in Skopje Region was not well developed and the lack of weapons was a serious problem. On the other hand, in some areas, as in Kumanovo, the strong pro-Serbian propaganda gained support, and other districts, as Kratovo, were under the control of the Supremists.

== The Ilinden Uprising ==
Before the start of the Ilinden Uprising in 1903 Pushkarov had on his disposal an armed detachment of 18 people, which carried 100 kilograms of dynamite and 200 bombs.

At the outbreak of the uprising Pushkarov was a chief of the rebel forces in the Skopje Region. On July 22, the band of Pushkarov settled in the Monastery "St. John", near the village of Vetarsko, close to where the river Pchinya flows into Vardar. From there the cheta could control the traffic on the railway. The detachment moved from the monastery to the village of Novachene and on August 1, they derailed a military train with 32 carriages. On 3 and 5 August respectively, they attacked a Turkish unit, guarding the bridge on the Vardar river and gave a battle in the "St. John" monastery. In the next few days the band was pursued by numerous Bashibozuks and moved slowly to Bulgaria, because it carried the wounded rebels with it. On August 20 the band runs through Vranje in Kyustendil. Nicola Pushkarov formed a new band there, which went into Macedonia again. The cheta moved to Kriva Palanka and in October after a battle in Prelesiya returned to Bulgaria.

== Later life ==
After the uprising Pushkarov returned to Bulgaria. He could no longer return to Skopje, as the Turkish police actively sought him and worked as a teacher in Plovdiv, Sofia and Vidin. During 1919, Pushkarov participated in the Provisional representation of the former United Internal Revolutionary Organization. In this period he called for the formation of independent Macedonia, in that way he hoped that the Macedonian population will develop into a distinct nation, thus it would cease to be a victim of the Greek, Serbian and the Bulgarian. Later, Pushkarov devoted himself to scientific work. He dealt with the study of the soil types and created the first soil map of Bulgaria in 1931. Pushkarov died on February 18, 1943, in Sofia. His native house in Pirdop today is a house museum. On his name was named the Institute of Soil Science in Sofia.

== Sources ==
- Спомени на Никола Пушкаров в "Движението отсамъ Вардара и борбата съ върховистите по спомени на Яне Сандански, Черньо Пеевъ, Сава Михайловъ, Хр. Куслевъ, Ив. Анастасовъ Гърчето, Петъръ Хр. Юруковъ и Никола Пушкаровъ; съобщава Л. Милетичъ", София, Печатница П. Глушковъ, 1927, поредица "Материали за историята на македонското освободително движение", Издава "Македонскиятъ Наученъ Институтъ", Книга VII (текст).
- Short biography on the official site of IMRO-BND
