= Boris Sarafov =

Bulgarian revolutionary (1872–1907)

Boris Petrov Sarafov
- Борис Петров Сарафов
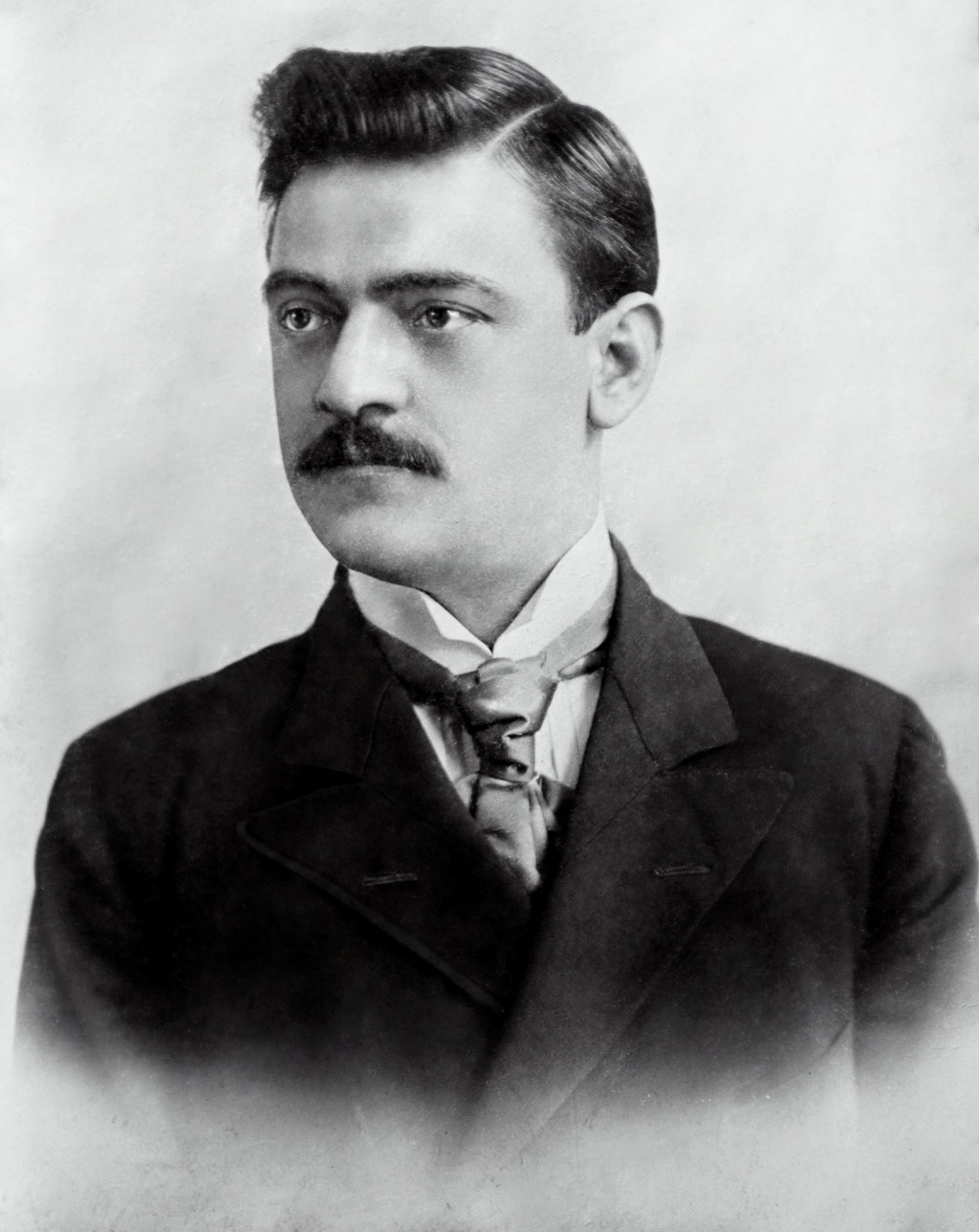
- Portrait of Boris Sarafov
- Born: 12 June 1872; Libyahovo, Ottoman Empire
- Died: 28 November 1907 (aged 35); Sofia, Principality of Bulgaria
- Cause of death: Assassination by gunshot
- Burial place: Central Sofia Cemetery
- Education: Sofia Military Academy
- Military career
- Allegiance: Bulgarian Army; SMAC; IMRO
- Branch: Bulgarian Army
- Rank: Lieutenant
- Conflicts: Ilinden Uprising

Signature
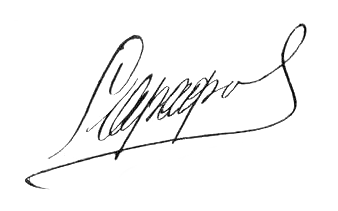

Boris Petrov Sarafov (Bulgarian and Macedonian: Борис Петров Сарафов; 12 June 1872 – 28 November 1907) was a Bulgarian Army officer, revolutionary, leader of the Supreme Macedonian-Adrianople Committee (SMAC) and the pro-Bulgarian, rightist wing of the Internal Macedonian Revolutionary Organization (IMRO). He self-identified occasionally as a Macedonian. Sarafov was a member of the General Staff of the Ilinden Uprising. After the uprising, he continued participating in the revolutionary movement until his assassination by IMRO's leftist faction in 1907.

== Biography ==
=== Early life ===
Boris Sarafov was born on 12 July 1872 in the village Libyahovo, Nevrokop region, in the Salonica vilayet of the Ottoman Empire (today Ilinden, Bulgaria). His relatives actively promoted the use of Bulgarian instead of Greek in schools and churches. His uncle, Kosta Sarafov, and his grandfather, Archimandrite Hariton, were active in the Bulgarian church struggle, while his father, Petar Sarafov, was an educational activist. In 1885, his father and grandfather were arrested after Greeks gave them up, and Sarafov saw them being taken in chains through the streets of Thessaloniki. They were exiled to a prison in Asia Minor, but his father managed to escape and went to Sofia.

After completing primary education in his native village, he received education at the Bulgarian Men's High School of Thessaloniki. Sarafov and Gotse Delchev were part of the same secret revolutionary circle in the school, with Delchev succeeding Sarafov as its leader, after he had left the school. His father sent him to the Military School of His Majesty in Sofia (capital of the recently created Principality of Bulgaria), because of his weak physique, hoping that it would strengthen him. Delchev was again his classmate. Sarafov was commissioned as a lieutenant in the Bulgarian Army.

=== Revolutionary activity ===
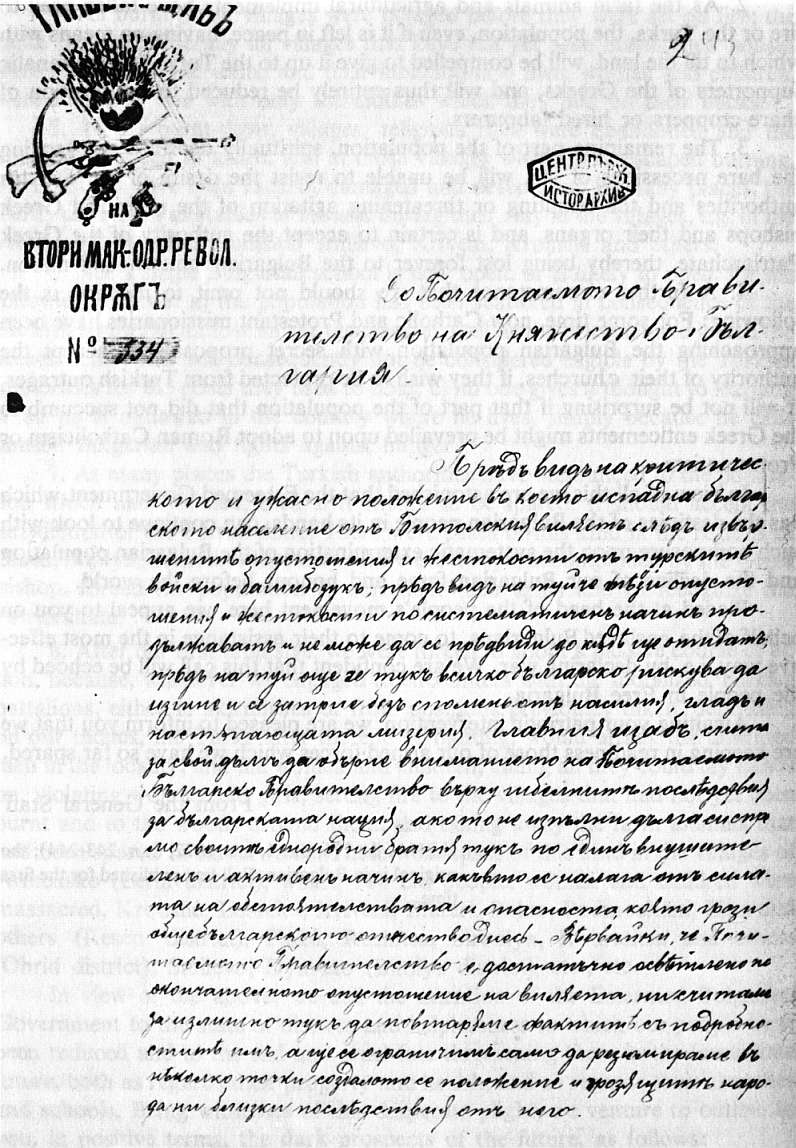
Letter from the General Staff of the Bitola Revolutionary District to the Bulgarian government, signed by Sarafov and requesting military intervention for the salvation of the local Bulgarians. (Note: Letter No. 534 from the General Staff of the Second Macedonian-Adrianople Revolutionary Region to the Bulgarian Government on the position of the insurgent Bulgarian population, requesting military intervention from Bulgaria, September 9, 1903, Bulgarian Academy of Sciences, Institute of History, Bulgarian Language Institute, "Macedonia. Documents and materials", Sofia, 1978, part III, No.92: "To the Esteemed Government of the Principality of Bulgaria. In view of the critical and terrible situation of the Bulgarian population of the Monastir Vilayet following the devastations and cruelties perpetrated by the Turkish troops and bashibazouks, in view of the fact that these devastations and cruelties continue systematically, and that one cannot foresee how far they will reach; in view, furthermore, of the fact that here everything Bulgarian is running the risk of perishing and being obliterated without a trace by violence, hunger and by approaching poverty, the General Staff considers it its duty to draw the attention of the Esteemed Bulgarian Government to the fatal consequences for the Bulgarian nation, if it fails to discharge its duty to its own brothers here in an impressive and energetic manner, made imperative by force of circumstances and by the danger threatening the common Bulgarian homeland at the present moment ...")

In 1895, he resigned from the army to serve the Macedonian cause. Through his teacher in Thessaloniki, Trayko Kitanchev, he became part of the revolutionary movement. As a member of the Macedonian Supreme Committee, in 1895, he led a detachment into Ottoman Macedonia, which led to the capture of Melnik, but failed to incite an uprising. Sarafov was not able to convince the locals to follow him. He ended up systematically destroying six villages and almost all of the grapevine in the area.

In 1896, he proposed that the Internal Macedonian Revolutionary Organization (IMRO) seemingly kidnap him while he was traveling with a Russian passport, allowing IMRO activists to hold him for ransom and gain revenue for their cause. Sarafov also suggested kidnapping the Serbian king to gain money. During the Spanish-American War, he contacted the American consul in Saint Petersburg, offering the service of a Macedonian mercenary legion, consisting of 500-600 men, in exchange for material and financial support for the Macedonian cause, but the consul rejected the offer, saying that they had enough volunteers. In the 6th Convention of SMAC held in Sofia on 1-5 May 1899, Sarafov was elected as its president, with the support of Gotse Delchev and Gyorche Petrov, as they hoped he would be friendly to their cause. In this period, there was close cooperation between IMRO and SMAC, until 1901.

In September 1899, Sarafov sent an emissary, lieutenant Ivan Kamburov, to mediate between IMRO and the Secret Revolutionary Brotherhood in Thessaloniki, and eventually an agreement was reached between the two. Gyorche Petrov later found out that the officers were double-crossing IMRO. While Sarafov's Committee was being formed, around twenty officers, including him and Ivan Tsonchev, were meeting without the participation or knowledge of IMRO, and were discussing the possibility of an internal takeover of IMRO, and advocate for an uprising as early as possible. They even made plans for the uprising. In 1900, Sarafov had managed to purchase over 1,000 modern Mannlichers secretly. However, only 200 arrived in Ottoman Macedonia. This angered IMRO's leaders, who believed that SMAC was intentionally humiliating them. Sarafov met an Ottoman informant, named Fitovsky, in Ruse, who offered to help him secure weapons from Romania. Without consulting anybody, Sarafov paid him, but also gave him information about the revolutionary movement, which Fitovsky passed on to the Ottoman government, resulting in the Bulgarian government receiving an official Ottoman protest note due to the information. A Bulgarian student named Todorov, who lived in Bucharest, also introduced himself to Sarafov as a Macedonian patriot, and Sarafov trusted him too, revealing the names of other sympathizers in Bucharest, so that he could form a committee there. After returning to Sofia, Sarafov had a realization about the deception and ordered Fitovsky's assassination without consulting Delchev and Petrov, which occurred in February 1900. The assassins were arrested after Todorov gave them up to the police. Delchev and Petrov scolded Sarafov due to his unauthorized use of Organization's members.

The Sublime Porte accused him of encouraging the formation of detachments and their raids into Ottoman Macedonia. Sultan Abdul Hamid threatened the Bulgarian government with the mobilization of troops to protect Ottoman territory against Bulgarian agitation. Sarafov had apparently plotted the assassination of a Romanian newspaper editor Ștefan Mihăileanu on 22 July 1900, who had published unflattering remarks about the Committee. The journalist's murder almost led to a war between Bulgaria and Romania. In 1901, Sarafov was stripped of his leadership and jailed for a month. The leadership passed on to Ivan Tsonchev. At the end of August, Sarafov and Toma Davidov, secretary of SMAC, gained the approval of the Bulgarian Minister for War for the creation of volunteer detachments of Macedonian emigrés in the case of war. The Sublime Porte joined Romania in asking for justice for Mihăileanu's murder from the Bulgarian government. In September 1900, an investigation led by the Romanian police concluded that there was a connection between the perpetrators of the crime and the Bulgarian committee in Bucharest, established in November 1899 by Sarafov himself. On the other hand, the Bulgarian government concluded that the evidence by the Romanian investigation team was insufficient for a trial against Sarafov. In November, the trial occurred in Romania, where Sarafov was sentenced in absentia, as the principal instigator of the crime. In January 1901, Bulgarian prince Ferdinand named a new prime minister, Racho Petrov, who said: "Sarafov is a rebel without a mandate, he discredited Bulgaria, his committee must disappear, the Principality would not be harmed in its legitimate longings." Bulgarian authorities arrested Sarafov and his associates on 23 March 1901. The charges were identical as the Bucharest trial: murder, blackmail, and extortion. In April 1901, a congress of SMAC condemned his revolutionary politics based on systematic terror in Macedonia (blackmail, extortion, and murder). In Bulgaria, politician Stoyan Danev said that Sarafov was discredited, having no power either in Macedonia or Bulgaria. What troubled Bulgarian leaders is that Sarafov appeared to them as a "Macedonian autonomist" rather than as a "Bulgarian annexationist." In the trial in August 1901, he and his associates were acquitted, and thus they were freed. Sarafov was also suspected of being involved in the kidnapping of Protestant missionary Ellen Stone by the US State Department, but he was not a credible suspect. The European media wrongly accused him of being the culprit.

In a 1901 interview with the London Times, Sarafov stated:

It is a grievous error to suppose that we seek to acquire Macedonia on behalf of Bulgaria. We Macedonians consider ourselves to be an entirely separate national element, and we are not in the least disposed to allow our country to be seized by Bulgaria, Servia [sic], or Greece. We will, in fact, oppose any such incorporation with all our might. Macedonia must belong to the Macedonians.

He also made such a claim for a Viennese newspaper and in the following year, he stated: "We the Macedonians are neither Serbs nor Bulgarians, but simply Macedonians." However, he used standard Bulgarian (sometimes with dialectal influence) in official and personal documents. He collected contributions for the revolutionary cause through force, for which he received warnings against doing it from the Bulgarian government and Russian diplomats in Sofia. Sarafov was also reputable as a man of considerable charm. He had travelled widely in Europe, raising funds for a war against the Ottomans. This included seducing the plain daughters or bored wives of wealthy men and persuading them to make donations to the revolutionary cause. In 1902, Sarafov was elected among the leaders of the Internal Macedonian Revolutionary Organization (IMRO). Prior to the Ilinden Uprising, Sarafov was criticized as extremely pro-Serbian and was an autonomist then. In 1902, Sarafov visited Belgrade trying to gain Serbian support for a "Macedonia for the Macedonians" to oppose the Bulgarian annexationists in Macedonia. Sarafov narrowly escaped death in the village Smardesh in 1903, which was pillaged and burned by Ottoman forces, who destroyed 160 houses and killed more than 80 inhabitants. Sarafov had mobilized neighboring village militias, who outflanked the Ottoman forces. He organized a network for smuggling weapons from Bulgaria into Macedonia and Andrianople, raising money for both SMAC and IMRO. He also sponsored the anarchist group Boatmen of Thessaloniki, which carried out terrorist attacks in Thessaloniki in April 1903. At the Smilevo Congress in 1903, Sarafov was selected to be a member of the three-man IMRO's general staff (including Dame Gruev and Atanas Lozanchev) for a forthcoming uprising on Ilinden. He authored "Disciplinary Regulation of Insurgents", along with Nikola Dechev. During May 1903, Sarafov and Gruev, toured the Manastir vilayet. They verified that their instructions about the organization of items were being followed. He supported the start of the uprising and participated in it. In September 1903, he and other members of the General Staff sent a letter to the Bulgarian government calling "on behalf of the enslaved Bulgarians, to come to their assistance in the most effective way, by declaring war". In the same month, during the suppression of the uprising, he coordinated the demobilization of detachments and their return to Bulgaria. In November 1903, Sarafov made another visit to Belgrade, when he obtained a significant grant of money from the Serbian government for allowing the entry of the first Serbian bands into Macedonia, whose decision was sharply criticized by other IMRO activists.

A criticism of Sarafov is that he was more concerned with his own agenda than the people he claimed to represent. In 1903, Krste Misirkov wrote that Sarafov was in opposition to the Bulgarian government, attempting to separate Macedonian politics from Bulgarian politics. He continued to be honored by the Macedonian emigrants in the United States after the uprising. Sarafov was described by William Curtis in 1903 as "a notorious gambler and dissolute politician...He squandered every dollar he could control and in order to gain funds for the support of himself and his associates, adopted a bold system of blackmail." Edith Durham wrote in 1903 following the uprising that he was unpopular in the Lake Prespa region. However, in January 1904, the British consul in Manastir (Bitola) reported that he was immensely popular there. Diplomatic sources suggest that he was considered as a hero in Sofia and Belgrade after the uprising. By 1904, Sarafov had a reputation of profiteering and embezzling funds from his organization. Per anthropologist Keith Brown, he was not a tool of Bulgarian policy until 1903 and Sarafov's alignment with Bulgarian forces was not consistent. According to Brown, due to his pre-Ilinden activism, he can be labelled as anti-Bulgarian. Per historian Raymond Detrez, Sarafov maintained a balanced, pro-Bulgarian policy, which was opposed by the more radical, leftist, and pro-autonomist Yane Sandanski.

After the failure of the uprising, Sarafov returned to Bulgaria, where he remained active in Macedonian affairs. The Organization was split into a leftist (federalist) faction and a pro-Bulgarian rightist (centralist) faction, and he became a leader of the latter. Sarafov did not agree with the decision made by Gruev about forced conversions of Patriarchists to the Bulgarian Exarchate in 1904. Like Gyorche Petrov, he opposed the idea that the detachments of IMRO could be a tool of the Exarchate. He participated in IMRO's Rila congress in 1905 as a delegate from the Bitola revolutionary district, where he was the main target of criticism, with him being charged that he took money from Serbs, assisted Serbian detachments to enter Macedonia, and sent his own detachments to spread discord to install himself as the leader of the Organization. Sarafov and Sandanski accused each other of being traitors to the cause. The Salonica Regional Committee passed a resolution for a trial against him. Sarafov also accused other people, including Gruev, whom he accused of giving himself up to Serbian vojvoda Micko Krstić. Sandanski was accused of alleged non-participation in the uprising, but he strongly defended his position, reminding delegates that Delchev was against the uprising, and his arguments were supported both by his fellow Serres associates and the delegates from the Strumica region. Gyorche Petrov managed to convince Sandanski to spare Sarafov, as Sandanski was prepared to kill him. The delegates of the congress decided not to examine the cases of the leaders who could have violated the rules to preserve the Organization's unity. On 10 October 1907, the Serres Regional Committee issued a death sentence for Sarafov and Garvanov, accusing them that they were acting on behalf of the Bulgarian state to subordinate the Serres activists fighting for the integrity and independence of the Organization. Sarafov originally assigned the leftist Todor Panitsa to assassinate Sandanski, however Panitsa remained loyal to Sandanski and agreed to do the opposite instead. The Serres Regional Committee organized the assassination of Garvanov and Sarafov. He was shot dead under Sandanski's order on 28 November 1907 in his home in Sofia together with Ivan Garvanov by Panitsa. The assassination of him and Garvanov led to the final disintegration of IMRO. He was buried in the Central Sofia Cemetery.

== Legacy ==
In 1939, journalist and historian Joseph Swire described him as "violent, tiresome, unscrupulous, with a genius for publicity, a picturesque figure who became legendary." American journalist Albert Sonnichsen recognized his service to the Macedonian cause, but depicted him as a tool of the Bulgarian royal court like the modern Macedonian historiography. In the People's Republic of Bulgaria and Socialist Republic of Macedonia, Sarafov was not well received in the official historiographies. He was regarded as politically unacceptable in SR Macedonia due to his pro-Bulgarian views, including the goal to unite Macedonia with Bulgaria. In North Macedonia, Sarafov's persona has been partially rehabilitated, as his role in the Ilinden uprising is generally downplayed, even though he was one of the main commanders. Part of the public in North Macedonia perceives Sarafov as a controversial Supremist i.e pro-Bulgarian revolutionary. In 2013, a biography of him by Pavel Shatev was published. As part of the controversial Skopje 2014 project, a monument to Sarafov was erected in the center of the city in 2013, which was a donation by sculptor Valentina Stevanovska. The monument was removed due to construction works on 10 December 2016 but its location is unknown. A street was named after Sarafov in Skopje but its name was changed in 2021.

In Sofia, a street is named after Sarafov.

== Gallery ==
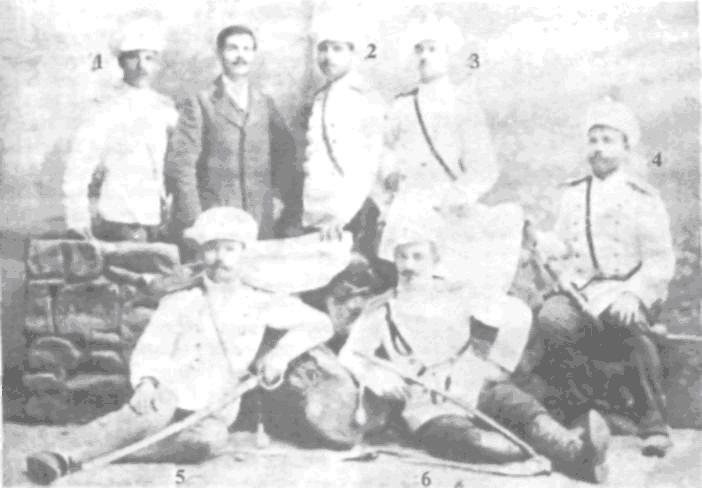
Bulgarian army officers. Sarafov is #3.

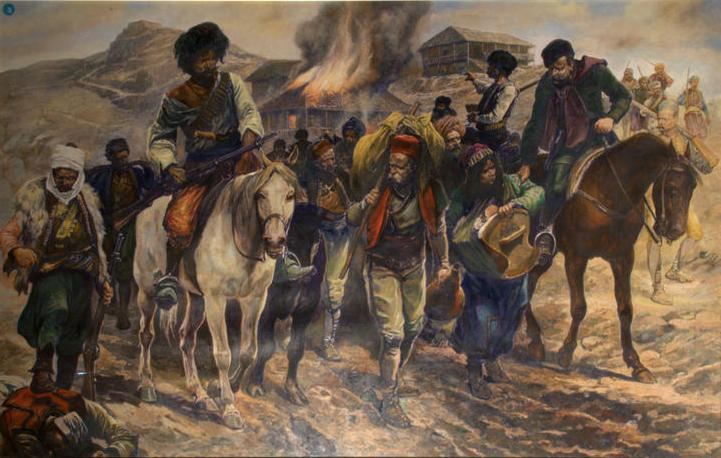
Boris Sarafov and his supporters.

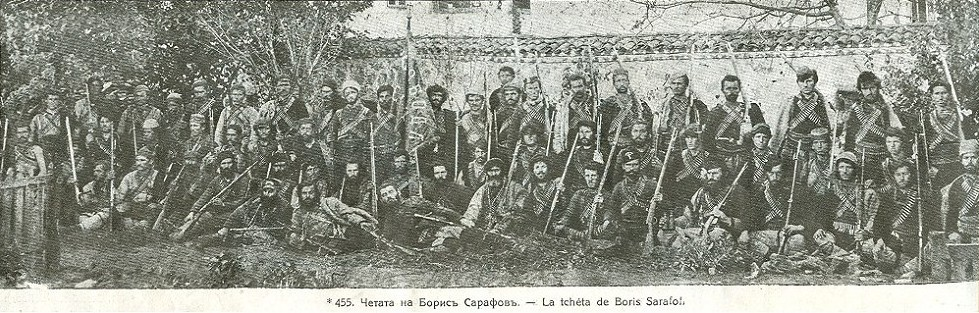
Lieutenant Boris Sarafov's revolutionary band.

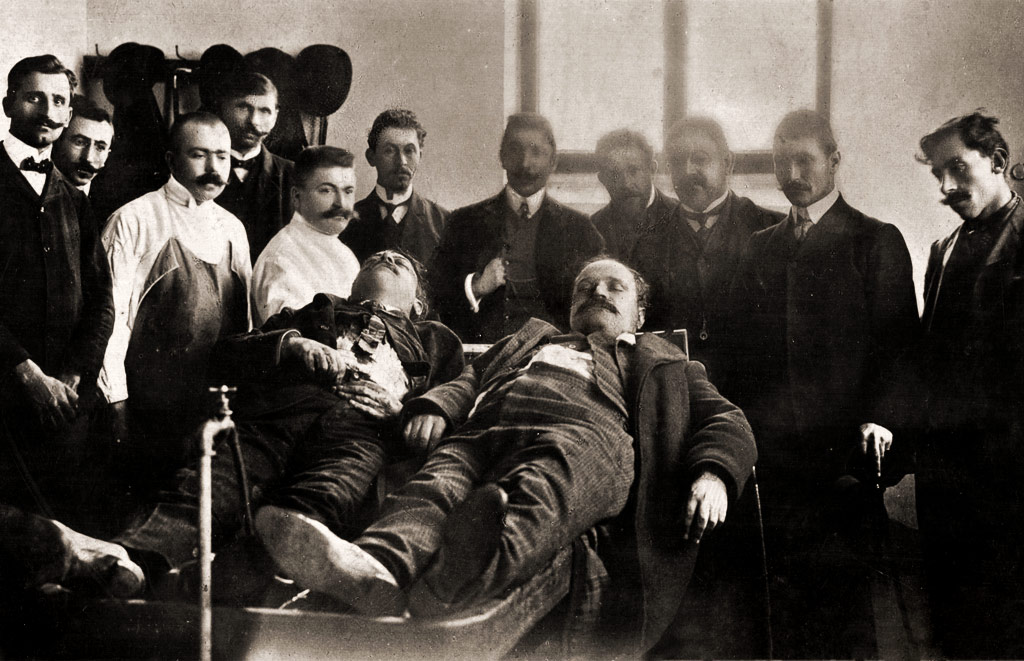
The bodies of Ivan Garvanov and Boris Sarafov among their friends.

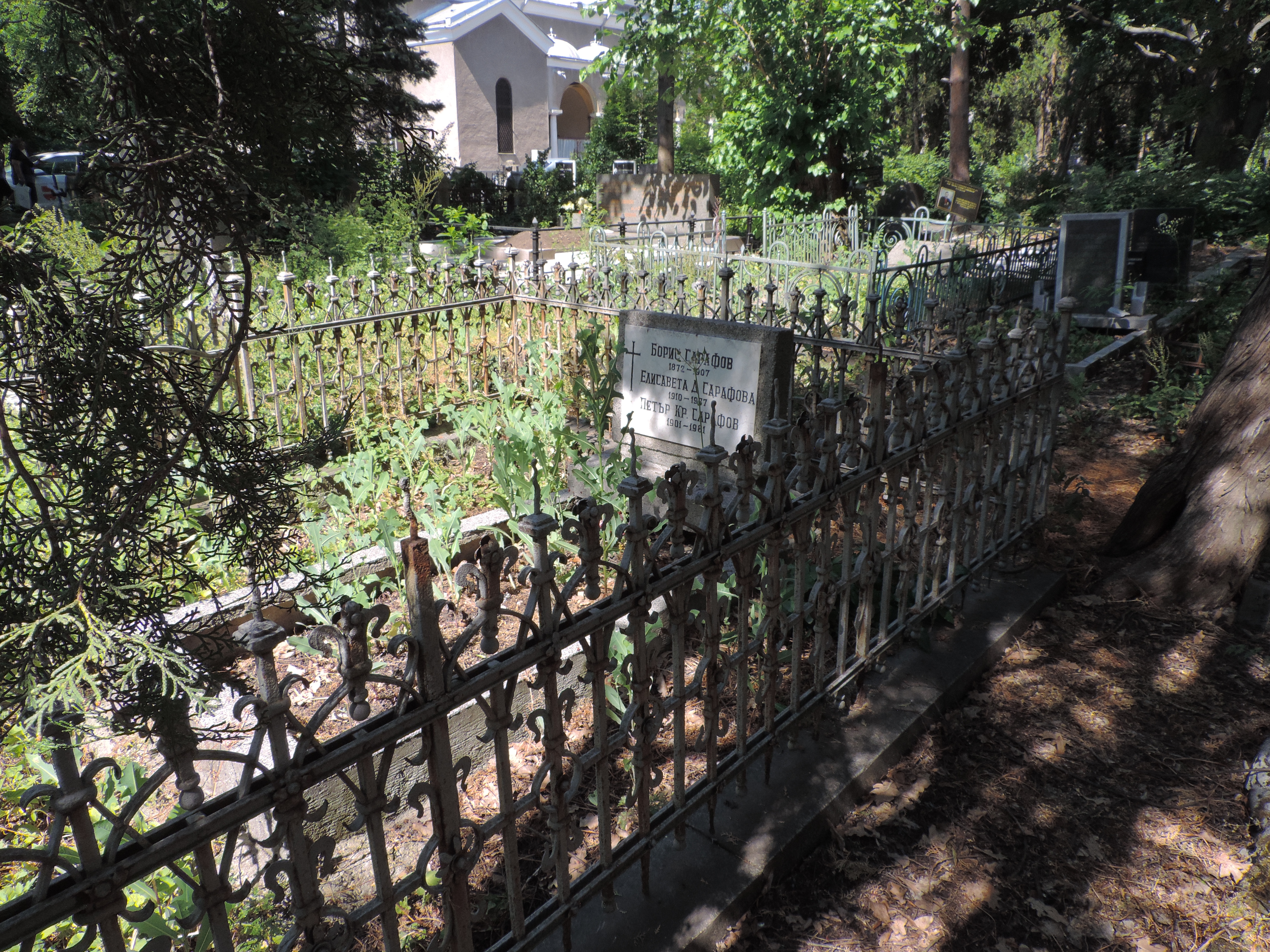
The grave of Sarafov at the Central Sofia Cemetery.

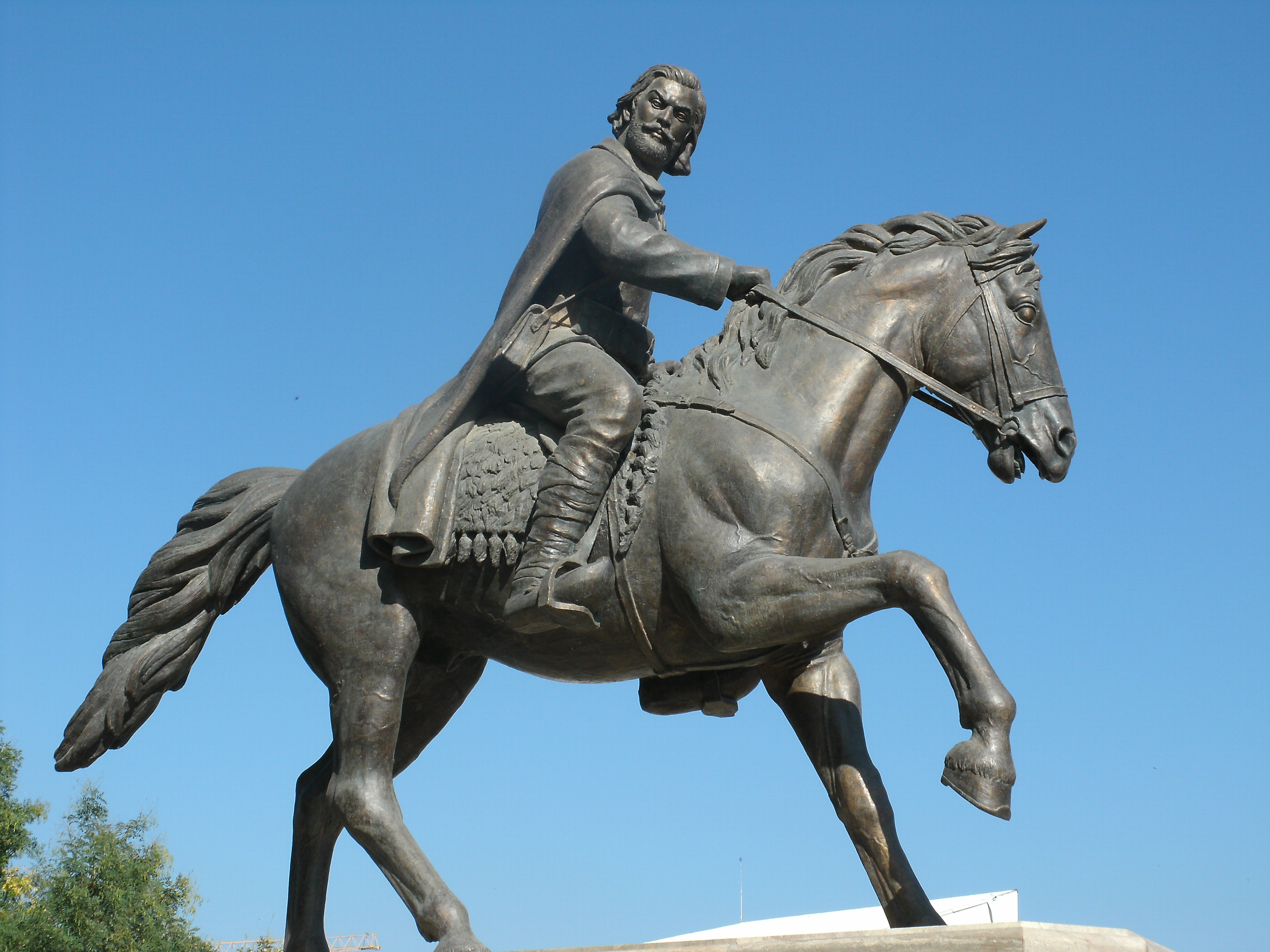
The former monument of Sarafov in Skopje, removed in 2016.
