= Gyorche Petrov =

Bulgarian teacher and revolutionary (1865–1921)

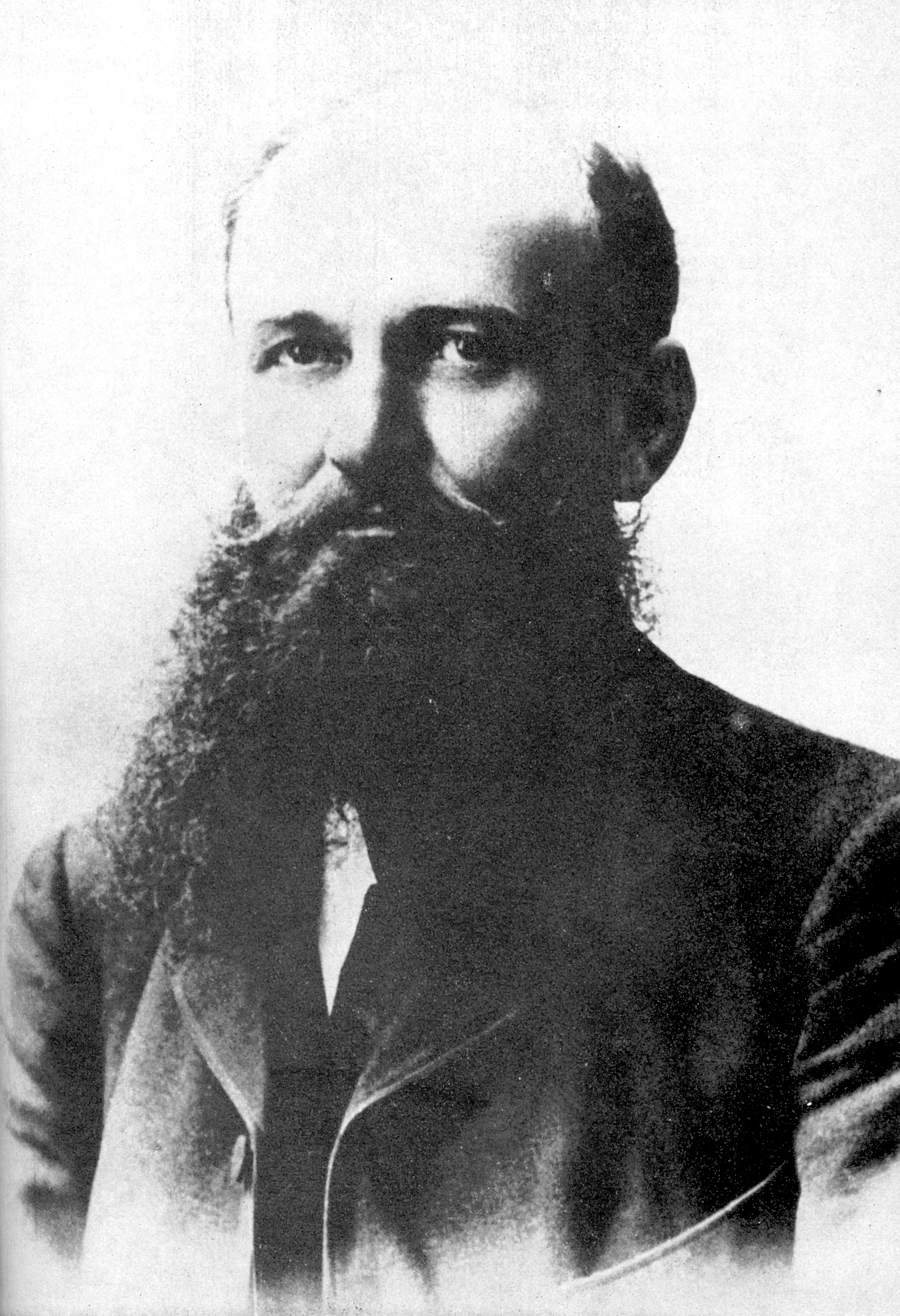
- Born: April 2, 1865; Varoš, Ottoman Empire
- Died: June 28, 1921 (aged 56); Sofia, Kingdom of Bulgaria
- Cause of death: Assassination

Gyorche Petrov Nikolov, (Note: (Bulgarian: Гьорче Петров Николов; Macedonian: Ѓорче Петров Николов, romanized: Gjorče Petrov Nikolov)) born Georgi Petrov Nikolov (Note: (Bulgarian: Георги Николов Петров, romanized: Georgi Petrov Nikolov; Macedonian: Ѓорги Николов Петров, romanized: Gjorgi Petrov Nikolov)) (April 2, 1865 – June 28, 1921), was a Macedonian Bulgarian teacher, revolutionary, and one of the leaders of the Internal Macedonian Revolutionary Organization (IMRO). In his youth, Petrov was involved in the Unification of Bulgaria and the subsequent Serbo-Bulgarian War. After the foundation of IMRO, he was its representative in Sofia, the capital of the Principality of Bulgaria. As such, he was also a member of the Supreme Macedonian-Adrianople Committee (SMAC), participating in the work of its governing body. During the Balkan Wars, Petrov was a Bulgarian army volunteer, and during the First World War, he was involved in the activity of the Bulgarian occupation authorities in Serbia and Greece. Subsequently, he participated in Bulgarian politics, but was killed by the rivaling IMRO right-wing faction.

== Biography ==
Born on April 2, 1865, in Varoš, Ottoman Empire (today North Macedonia), he studied at the Bulgarian Exarchate's school in Prilep and the Bulgarian Men's High School of Thessaloniki. Later, he attended the gymnasium in Plovdiv, capital of the recently created Eastern Rumelia. Here he joined the Bulgarian Secret Central Revolutionary Committee founded in 1885. The original purpose of the committee was to gain autonomy for the region of Macedonia (then called Western Rumelia), but it played an important role in the organization of the Unification of Bulgaria and Eastern Rumelia. In the same year, he was a volunteer in the Bulgarian army during the Serbo-Bulgarian War. Petrov worked as a Bulgarian Exarchate teacher in geography, Bulgarian and French languages in the Bulgarian schools of Štip, Skopje, Bitola, and Thessaloniki in the period from 1885 to 1897. By 1896, Petrov became unpopular with the Exarchate due to disputes with Archimandrite Neofit over the organization of the village schools and his demands for reforms, which were supported by the local guilds.

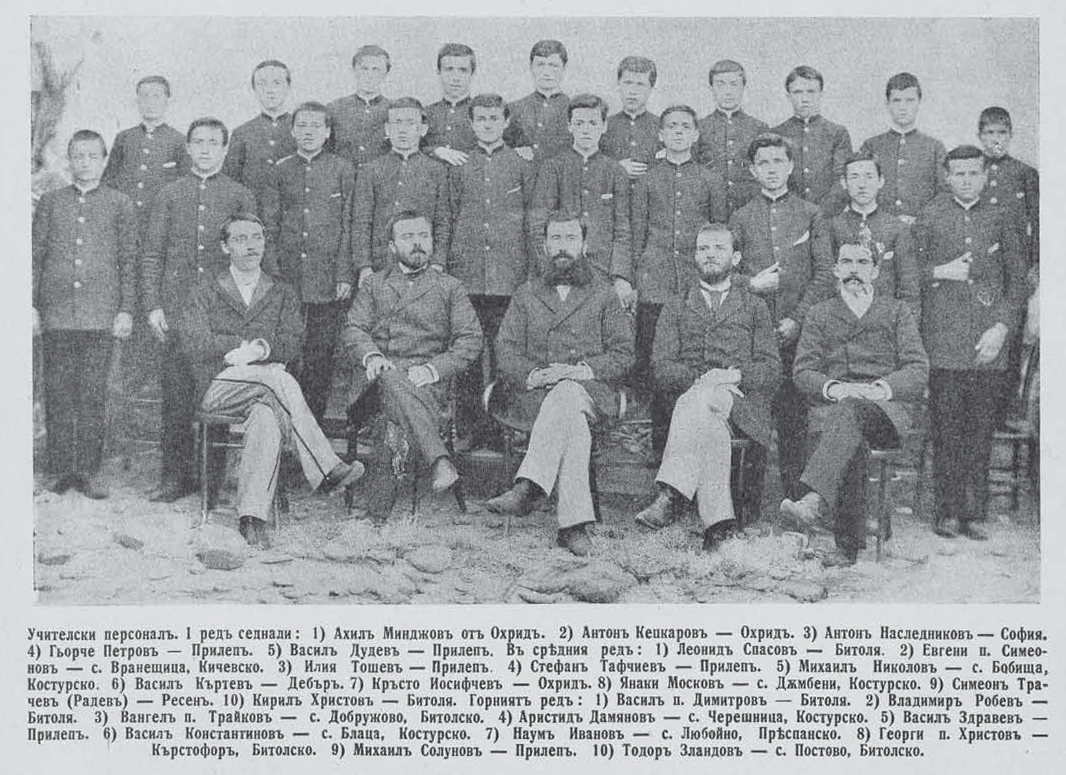
Teachers and pupils from Bulgarian boys' school in Bitola. Petrov is the fourth person on the first row from left to right.

In 1893, Petrov joined the Internal Macedonian Revolutionary Organization (IMRO). In the Thessaloniki Congress of IMRO in 1896, he was among the authors of the organization's new statute and rules, which he co-wrote with Gotse Delchev, which envisioned a common anti-Ottoman alliance of all ethnicities in Macedonia and Adrianople. In official and personal documents, he wrote in standard Bulgarian, sometimes with dialectal influences. Petrov became a member of IMRO's Central Committee in 1896. He also published an ethnographic study of Macedonia's population, which he described as consisting of Bulgarians, Turks, Albanians, Vlachs (Aromanians and Megleno-Romanians), Jews and Romani people. Petrov was the representative of the Foreign Committee of the IMRO in Sofia from 1897 to 1901. In 1898, Petrov established close ties with Bulgarian officers from the region of Macedonia, such as Ivan Tsonchev, Anastas Yankov and Boris Sarafov. At his instigation, these officers created brotherhoods in most garrisons of the Principality of Bulgaria to collect funds and petitions for the Macedonian cause. Relations between IMRO and the Supreme Macedonian-Adrianople Committee (SMAC) were not harmonious initially. SMAC insisted on having Bulgarian army officers dominate actions, whereas IMRO wanted to stay independent of government control. The organization then was largely dependent on the Bulgarian state and army assistance that was mediated by him and Delchev. He was named by his adversaries as "the Macedonian Beelzebub," referencing his experience in political maneuvering. Petrov and Delchev had initially approached Dimitar Blagoev to become the leader of SMAC but he refused. Thus, Petrov and Delchev settled on Sarafov, who became the new leader. According to the statute of the Secret Macedonian-Adrianople Revolutionary Organization (SMARO) drafted by him and Delchev, the Organization was open to membership to every "Macedonian or Adrianopolitan", regardless of nationality. In this period, there was close cooperation between SMARO and SMAC, but Tsonchev and other Bulgarian officers ended up organizing a faction against Petrov and Delchev.

In the article "The Macedonian Liberation Cause on Bulgarian Soil", published in 1902 in Sofia, Petrov revealed the differences in the revolutionary tactics of the IMRO and SMAC and the reasons for their bad relations. He criticized the provocative activities of the SMAC leaders Ivan Tsonchev and Stoyan Mihaylovski, who took the path of starting an unprepared uprising in Macedonia. Despite Petrov's warnings, in 1902, SMAC organized the Gorna Dzhumaya Uprising, which was a failure. Petrov did not approve of the untimely outbreak of the Uprising on Ilinden, August 2, 1903. In a discussion about the uprising, as a skilled debater, he was able to convince most participants temporarily that an uprising was unsuitable. Petrov and Delchev also created anti-Ottoman special terror units. He participated in the uprising as the leader of a cheta (armed band), of which Aromanian revolutionary Ioryi Mucitano was part of.

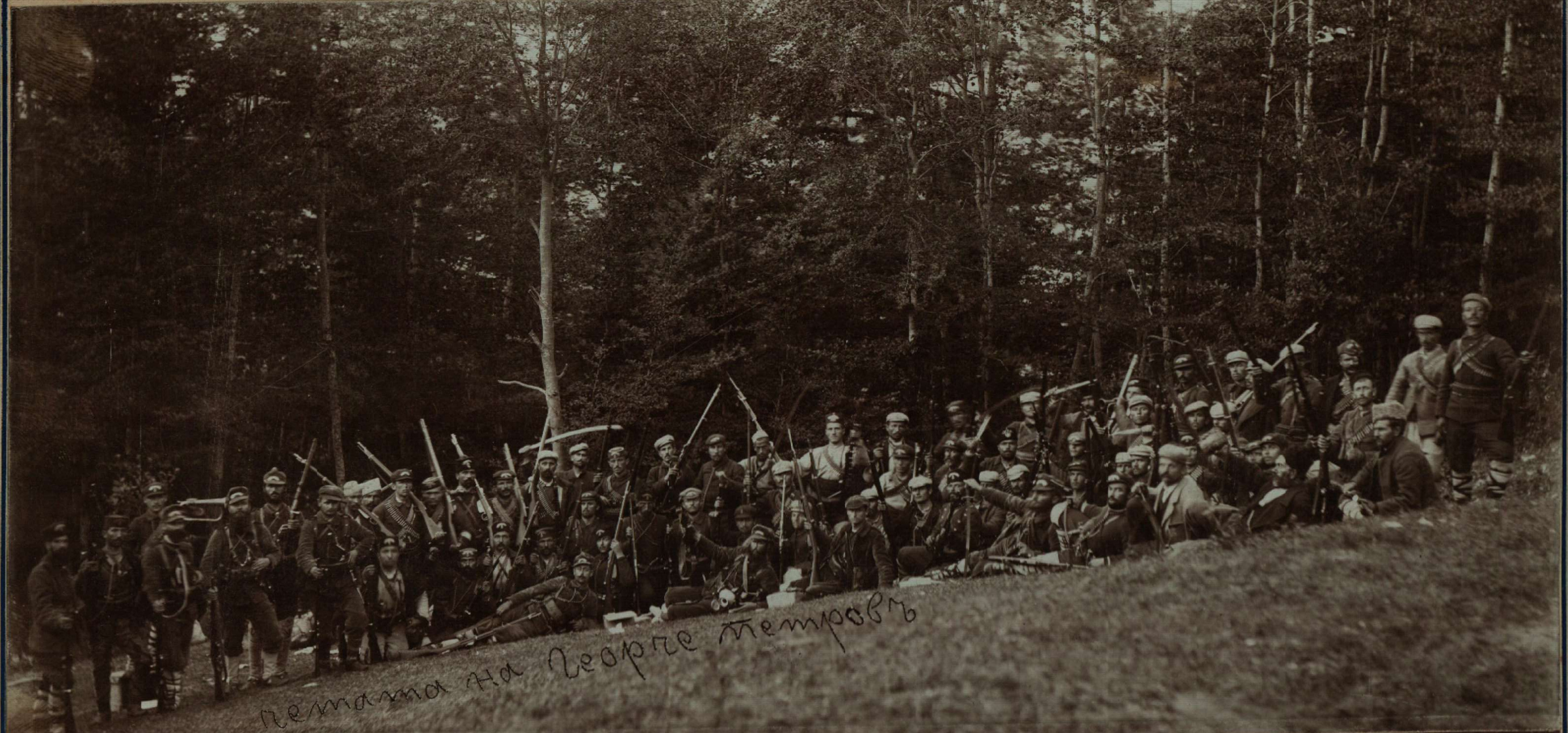
Petrov and his cheta in 1903.

After the uprising was suppressed, he retained his position as an IMRO leader. Together with Yane Sandanski, Petrov led the leftist (federalist) faction during the split within the IMRO. In 1904, IMRO initiated a campaign of forcefully converting Patriarchist villages to the Exarchate, which was opposed by Petrov. Petrov was again included in the foreign representation in Sofia from 1905 to 1908. After the Young Turk Revolution of 1908, together with writer Anton Strashimirov and Pere Toshev, Petrov edited the "Kulturno Edinstvo" ("Cultural Unity") magazine, published in Thessaloniki (Solun) during 1908-1909.

During the Balkan Wars, Petrov was a volunteer in the fifth company of Macedonian-Adrianopolitan Volunteer Corps. Petrov served as the leader of the cultural department of the local Bulgarian administration in Serres. He was the president of the Regular Regional Committee in Bitola during the Bulgarian occupation of Southern Serbia, i.e. Vardar Macedonia, but after the Bulgarian occupation of Northern Greece, he became the mayor of Drama. At the end of the war, he was one of the initiators of the formation of a new leftist organization called Provisional representation of the former United Internal Revolutionary Organization, and this government set a task of defending the positions of the Macedonian Bulgarians by agitating for a creation of independent Macedonia at the Paris Peace Conference (1919–1920). In 1919, Todor Aleksandrov wrote a letter in which he accused Petrov of being a traitor to Bulgarian people. (Note: "Only the narrow-minded bolshevik Hadzhidimov, the lazy anarchist Gerdzhikov, the scheming-beelzebub Gyorche and the traitors of the Bulgarian people, both in the past and now, the Sandanists, speak and agitate that autonomy should be demanded for Macedonia, because it is a separate economic and geographical unit with a separate "Macedonian people", with its own history spanning centuries, and so that they would not have to pay Bulgaria's debts, and some of them threaten as follows: "If by some miracle all of Macedonia is given to Bulgaria, we will fight with arms in hand to prevent this unification.")

He kept close ties with the new government of Bulgarian Agrarian National Union (BANU), especially with war minister Aleksandar Dimitrov and some other prominent Agrarian leaders with whom he founded the leftist Macedonian Federative Organization. BANU rejected territorial expansion and aimed at forming a Balkan federation of agrarian states, a policy which began with a détente with Yugoslavia. As a result, Petrov became a chief of the Bureau for the Settlement of the Refugees by the Ministry of Internal Affairs. Then Petrov had to deal with the problem of Bulgarian refugees who had to leave Yugoslavia and Greece, thus incurring IMRO rightist faction leaders' hatred upon himself. As a result of differences over whether a possible autonomous Macedonia should be guided towards Greater Yugoslavia together with Bulgaria, or as the right-wing IMRO leaders insisted, towards Greater Bulgaria, he was killed by an IMRO assassin on June 28, 1921, in Sofia, on the order of Todor Aleksandrov. The assassination of Petrov complicated relations between IMRO and the Bulgarian government, and produced significant dissensions in the Macedonian movement.

== Views ==
Petrov self-identified as a Macedonian Bulgarian. He regarded Macedonia as a "distinct moral unit" with its own "ideology" and "aspirations." Petrov promoted the independence of IMRO, away from the "nationalistic propagandas" of the Balkan states. Per historian Raymond Detrez, his stance regarding the various autonomist and federalist tendencies in the Organization was not always very clear.

Bulgarian academic, diplomat and journalist Simeon Radev, who was his pupil in Bitola, wrote:

Gyorché Petrov taught us geography, Bulgarian and French. Undoubtedly, he had the strongest personality among all his colleagues... He was not a good teacher. He did not know much French himself, and in Bulgarian he had not managed to rid himself of his Prilep dialect. He was pale, even yellowish, with a cold face and eyes which seemed to penetrate our souls, and he emanated something enigmatical; we did not like him. But we were attracted by his geography lessons. From them, we gained an idea of the bounds of our Bulgarian fatherland. He would stress to us - and in those moments, he seemed to become very animated - the indivisibility of Macedonia from the Bulgarian whole.

Bulgarian academic Lyubomir Miletich, who recorded his memoirs in 1908, described him as "an able, even cunning, diplomat, orator and propagandist, energetic and stubborn to the point of fanaticism in the pursuit of his aim, and always convinced that he was right - a weakness that sometimes isolated him from his comrades. He asked little for himself, accepting without complaint all manner of privations and inconveniences. His outward appearance was modest, and his mode of dress careless, as if to assert his democratic views, but he was, in fact, an extremely proud man, conscious of his own undoubted abilities and bursting with self-confidence."

== Legacy ==
During World War II, the Macedonian Partisans named units after him and other figures, with whom the Communist Party of Yugoslavia and its regional leaders identified themselves with.

Streets in Sofia and Blagoevgrad, Bulgaria, bear the name of Petrov. According to the Macedonian historiography, he was an ethnic Macedonian. The story about his assassination is the basis of Kole Čašule's play Crnila (Darkness), written in 1960 and adapted into a film in 1965 (Days of Temptation, directed by Branko Gapo). To honor him, a suburb of Skopje was named Gjorče Petrov.

== Gallery ==
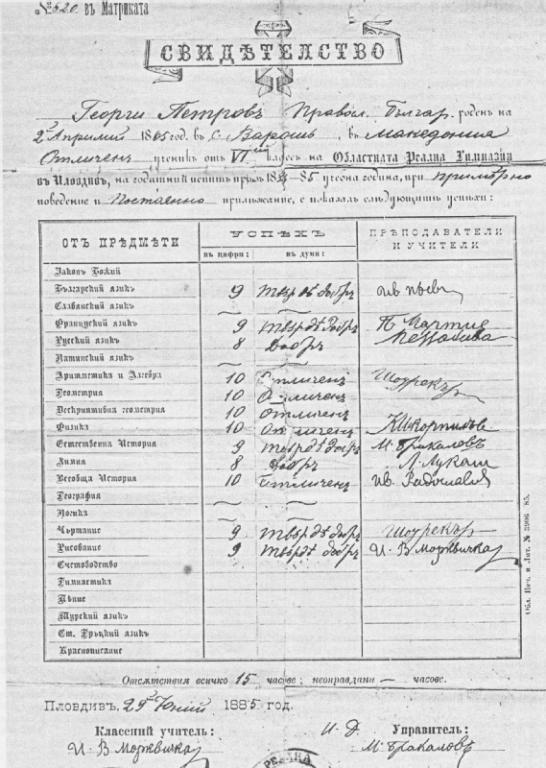
Diploma issued by the Bulgarian gymnasium in Plovdiv, Eastern Rumelia, to Petrov

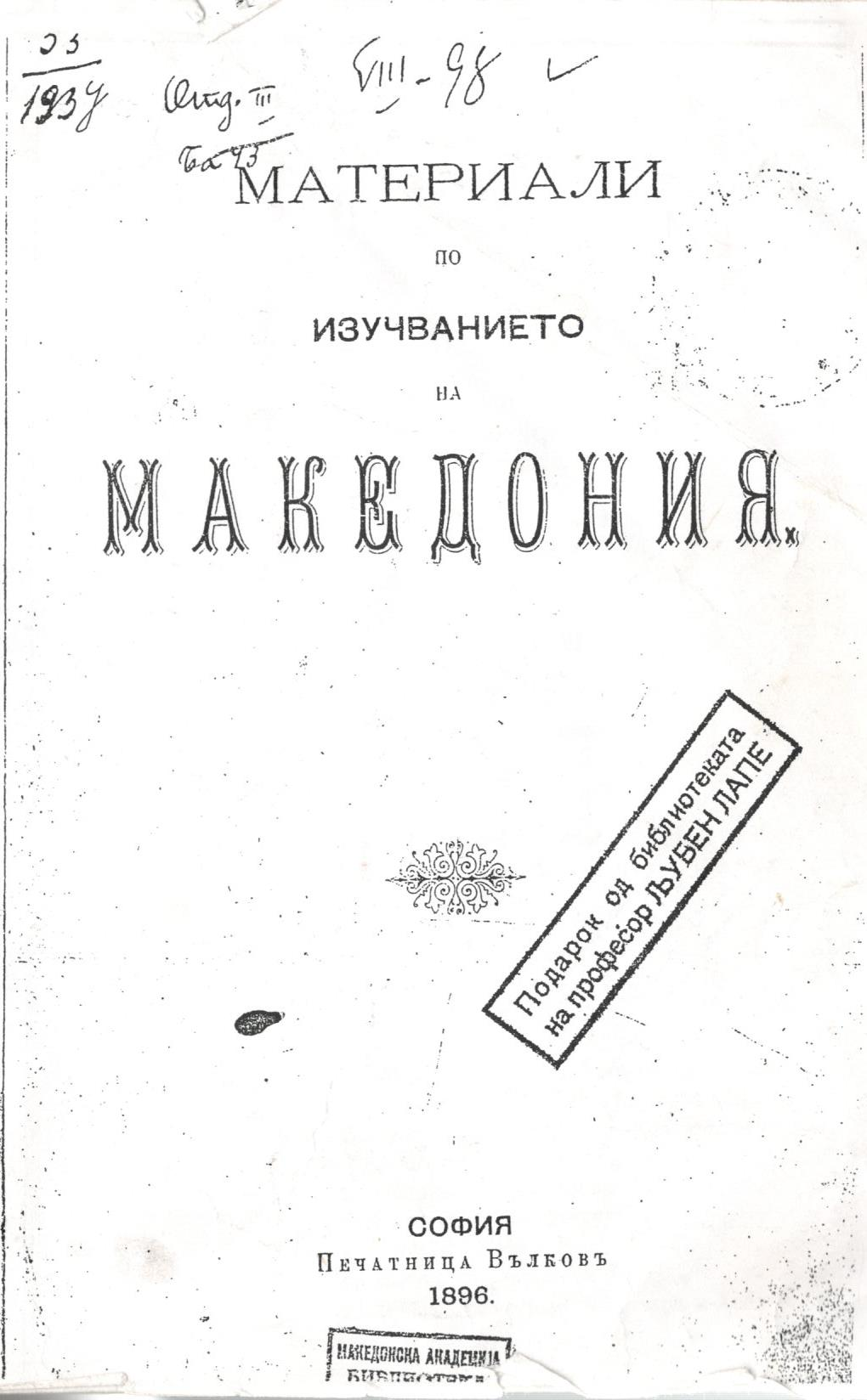
Cover of his 1896 book Materials on the study of Macedonia

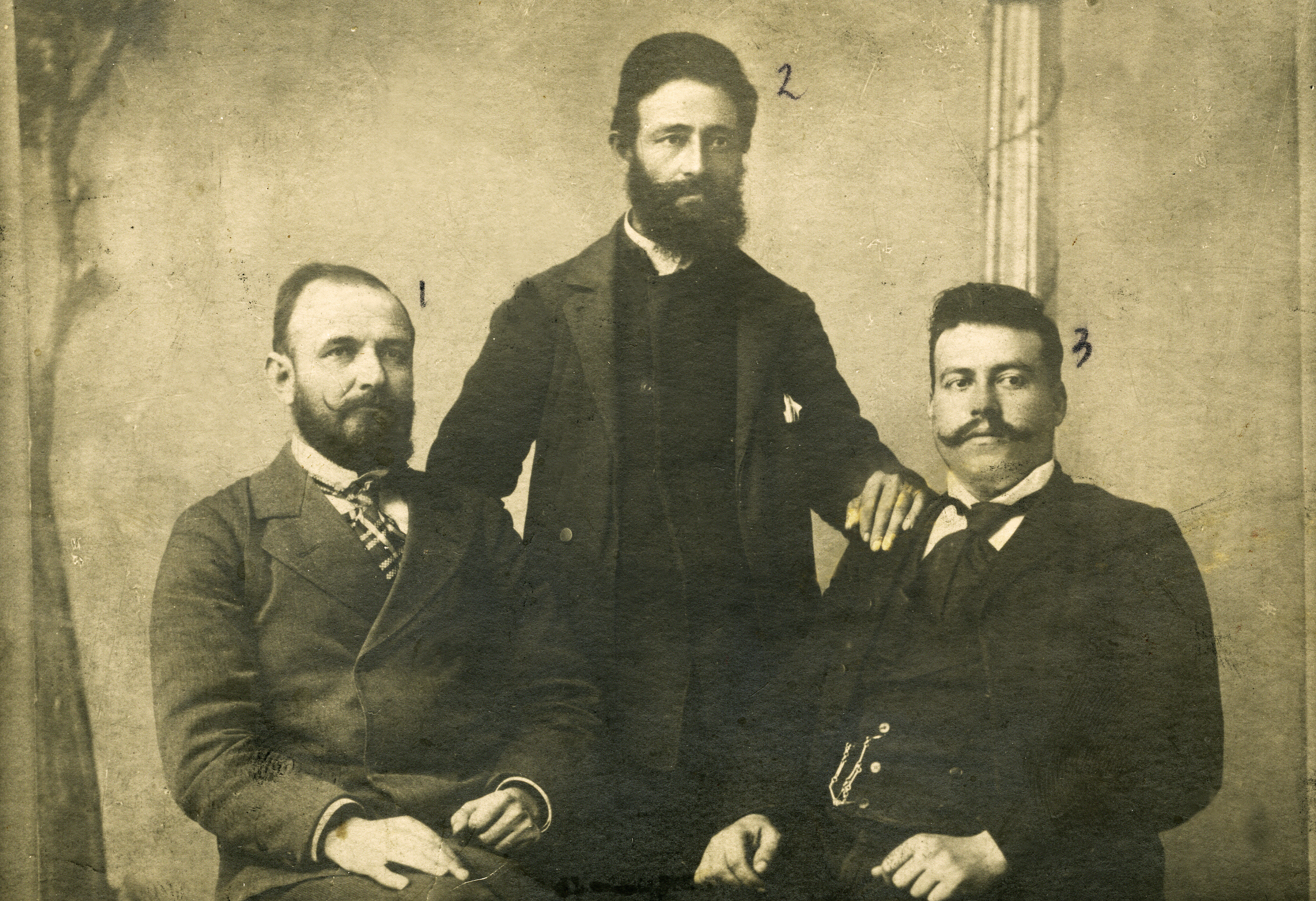
Gyorche Petrov, Nikola Maleshevski and Gotse Delchev

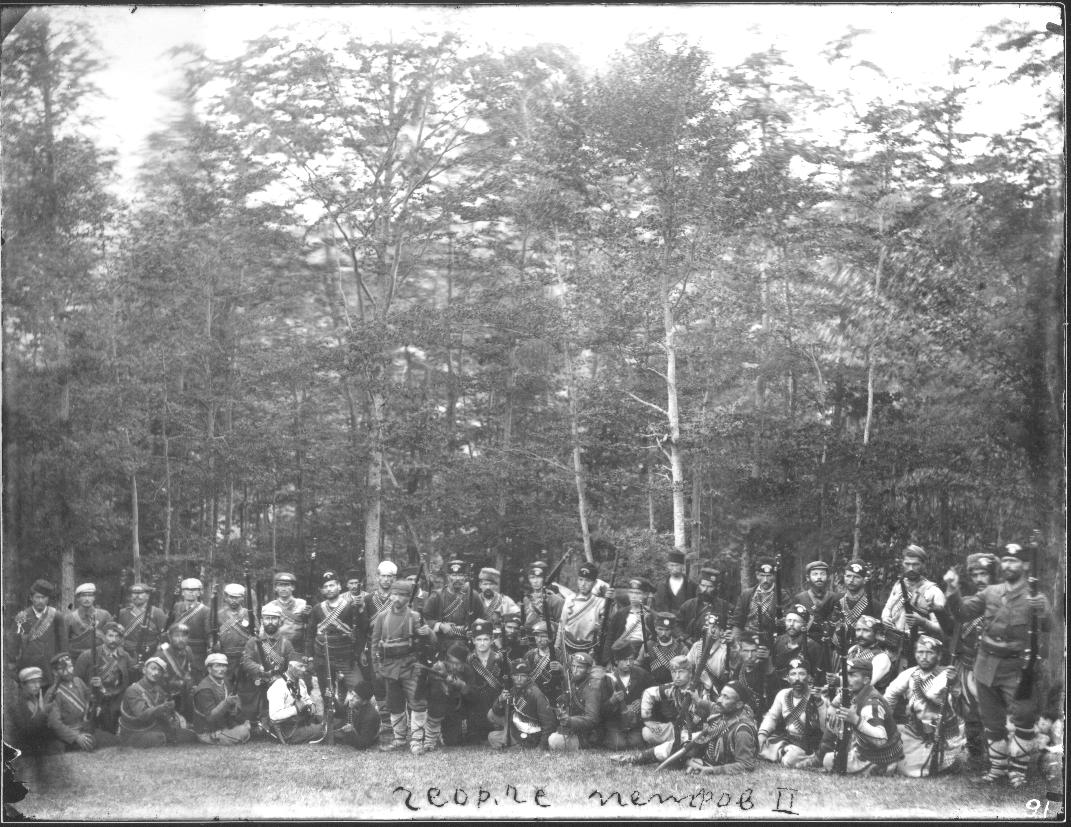
Gyorche Petrov with his squad

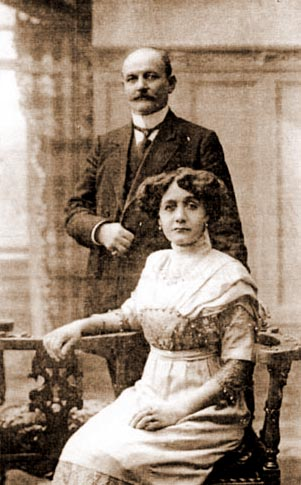
Gyorche Petrov with his wife Yordanka

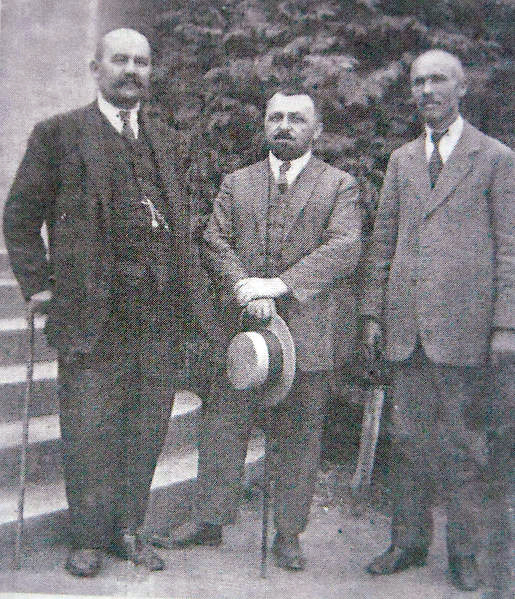
Gyorche Petrov, Arseni Yovkov and Georgi Pop Hristov

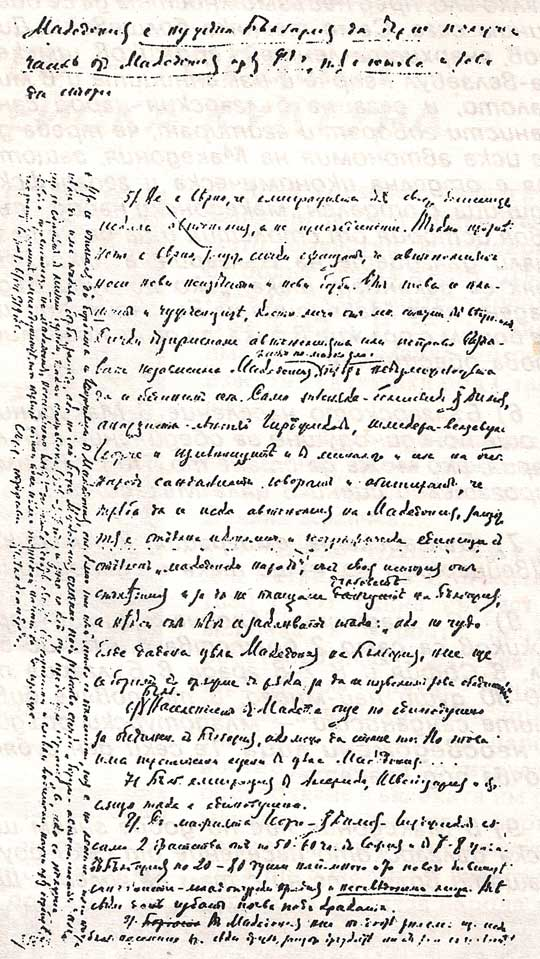
Excerpt from a letter Todor Aleksandrov wrote in which he accused Petrov of being a traitor to Bulgarian people.

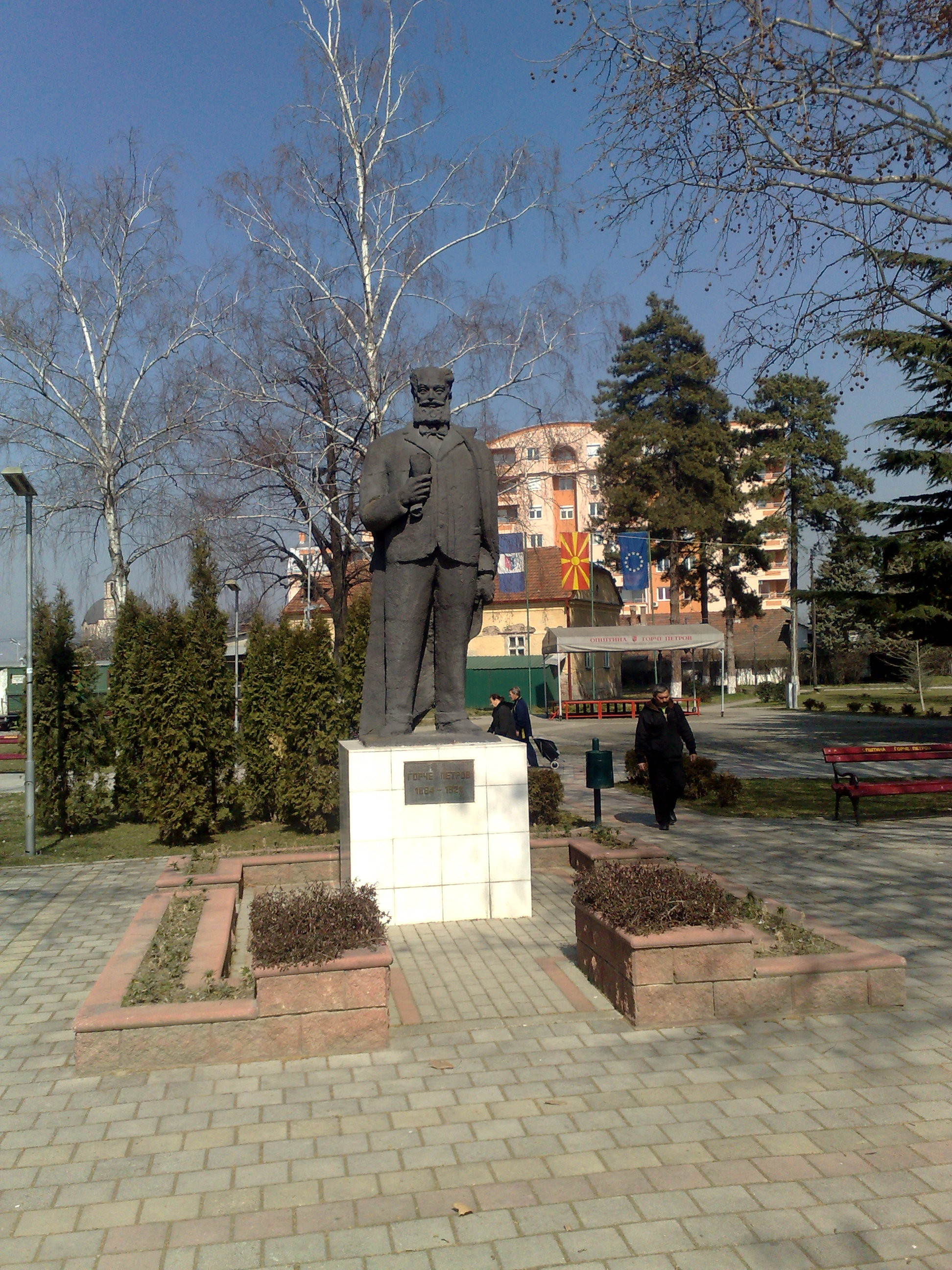
Monument of Gyorche Petrov in the park of the suburb named after him
