= Joseph Swire =

Joseph Swire (1903–1978) was a journalist and historian with a particular interest in the Balkans.

== Life ==
Swire travelled in Albania and wrote a book about the country before being accredited as a journalist there in 1930. In 1931 he was expelled for publishing stories displeasing to the Zog regime. In 1932 he became the correspondent of Reuters and The New York Times in the Bulgarian capital Sofia, where he was expelled in 1935.

After the Second World War he settled in the west of Scotland and worked as bursar to Gordonstoun School.

== Publications ==
- Albania: The Rise of a Kingdom, 1929
- King Zog's Albania, 1937
- Bulgarian Conspiracy, 1939
