= Kneževo, North Macedonia =

Village in northeastern North Macedonia

Kneževo Кнежево
- Village
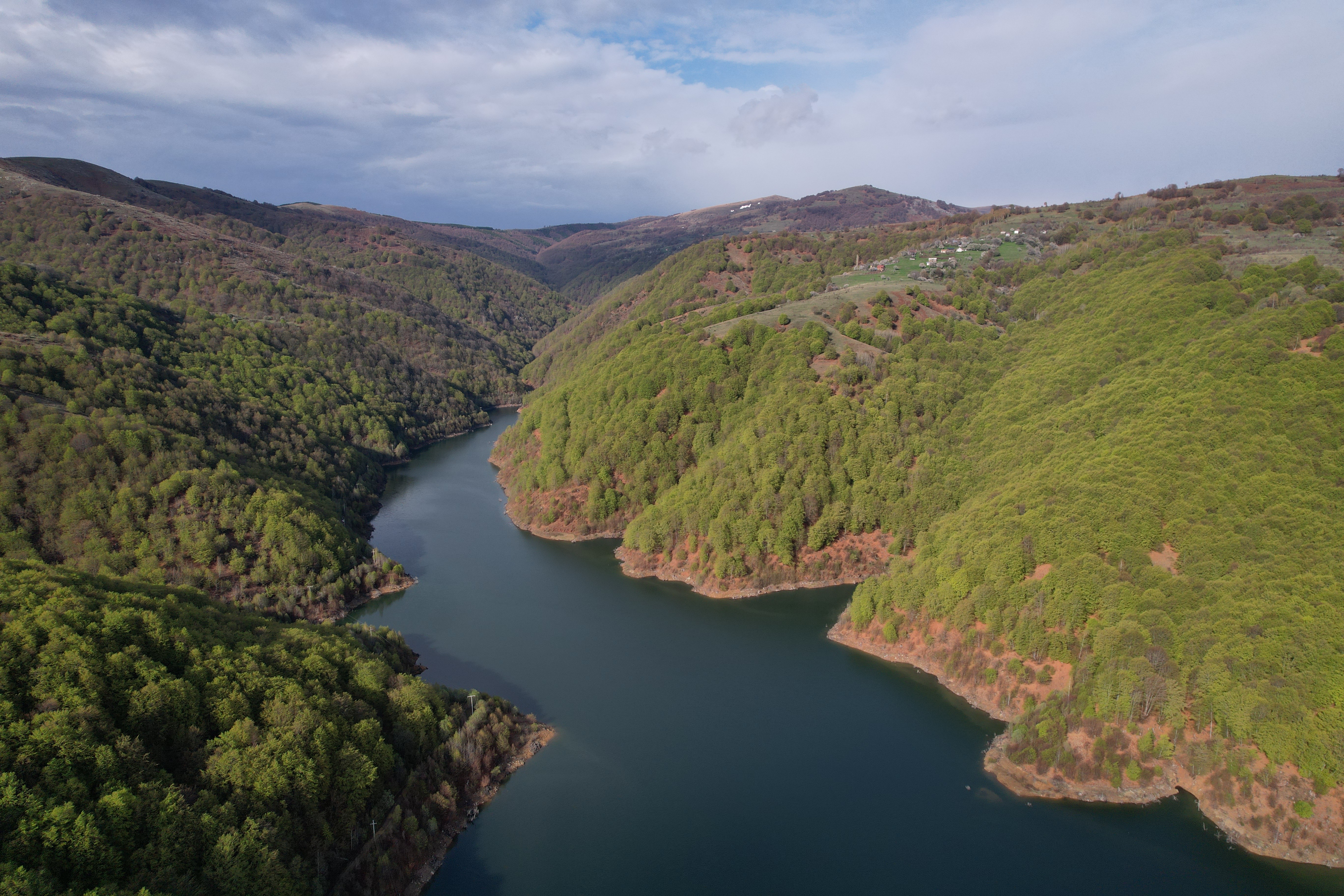
- View of the village

- Location within North Macedonia
- Coordinates: 42.11°N 22.31°E
- Country: North Macedonia
- Region: Northeastern
- Municipality: Kratovo

Area
  - Total: 18.3 km^{2} (7.1 sq mi)
- Highest elevation: 1,440 m (4,720 ft)
- Lowest elevation: 1,050 m (3,440 ft)

Population (2021)
  - Total: 12
  - Density: 0.66/km^{2} (1.7/sq mi)
- Time zone: UTC+1 (CET)
  - Summer (DST): UTC+2 (CEST)

Kneževo (Macedonian: Кнежево) is a mountainous village in Kratovo Municipality, North Macedonia. It is situated next to a lake of the same name. According to the 2021 census, it had a population of 12.

== History ==
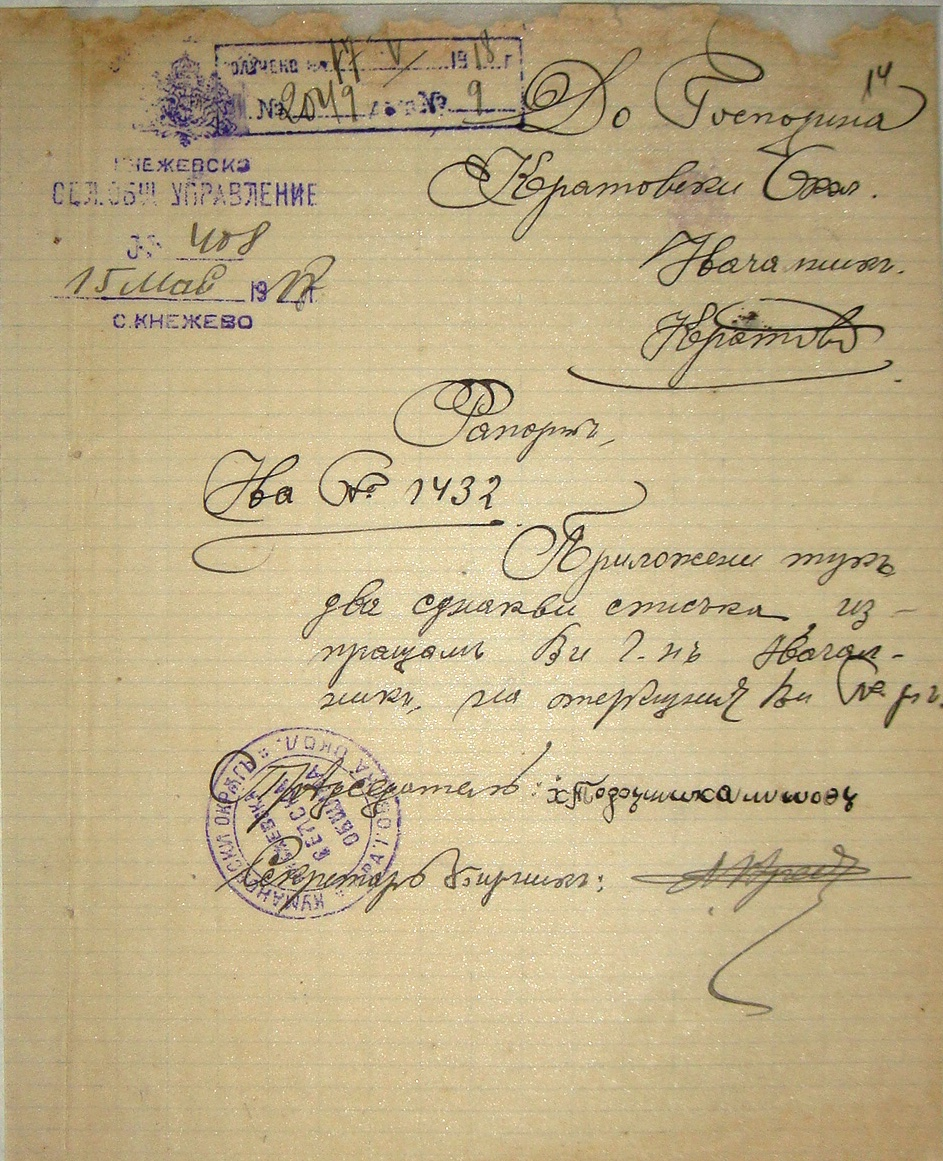
Document stamped by the municipality in the village on 15 May 1918.

Ottoman tax registers of the non-Muslim population in the Kratovo oblast from 1618–19 recorded the village as Кнездже, listing 11 jizya-paying households. In a register of settlements from the same oblast dated 1637, the village appears again under the same name, this time with 13 jizya-paying households.

Vasil Kanchov's 1900 survey recorded 196 Bulgarian Christians in the village. Later, in 1905, Secretary of the Bulgarian Exarchate, Dimitar Mishev, (Note: Dimitar Mishev wrote under the pseudonym "Brancoff".) documented 224 Exarchist Bulgarians in Knejevo.

In January 1905, a congress was held in the village by the Skopje revolutionary district of the Internal Macedonian Revolutionary Organization.

During the Balkan Wars, 15 volunteers from the village joined the Macedonian-Adrianopolitan Volunteer Corps.

== Geography ==
The village is situated in the eastern part of Kratovo Municipality next to Lake Kneževo, 16 kilometers away from Kratovo. Its terrain is mountainous, with elevations ranging from 1,440 to 1,050 meters. It covers an area of 18.3 square kilometers. A part of this village lies on the Ermička Mountain.

== Demographics ==
The village has experienced a decline in population due to emigration.

=== Ethnic groups ===
The historical ethnic makeup of this village is as follows: (Note: In 1948, the population was 519, with no recorded ethnic composition.)

Ethnicity	Year							
Ethnicity	1953	1961	1971	1981	1991	1994	2002	2021
Macedonians	520	427	371	170	91	89	64	12
Others	1	4	0	2	0	0	0	0
Total	521	431	371	172	91	89	64	12

=== Sex distribution ===
The historical population of both sexes in this village is as follows:

Sex	Year							
Sex	1948	1953	1961	1971	1981	1991	1994	2002
Male	269	270	214	193	90	52	53	37
Female	250	251	217	178	82	39	36	27
