= Salonica revolutionary district =

- Солунски революцонен окръг
- Leader: Damyan Gruev
- Dates active: July 1894 - May 1934
- Headquarters: Salonica
- Part of: Internal Macedonian-Adrianople Revolutionary Organization

The Salonica revolutionary district (Bulgarian/Macedonian): Солунски револуционерен округ, Solunski revolyutsionen okrag) was an organizational grouping of the Internal Macedonian-Adrianople Revolutionary Organization. The most famous leader of the group was Damyan Gruev. This rebel group was active in central part of Aegean Macedonia and in southern Vardar Macedonia with headquarters in Thessaloniki (historically known as Salonica, Solun in Bulgarian and Macedonian).
