= Republic Day (North Macedonia) =

Holiday in North Macedonia

Republic Day Ден на Републиката
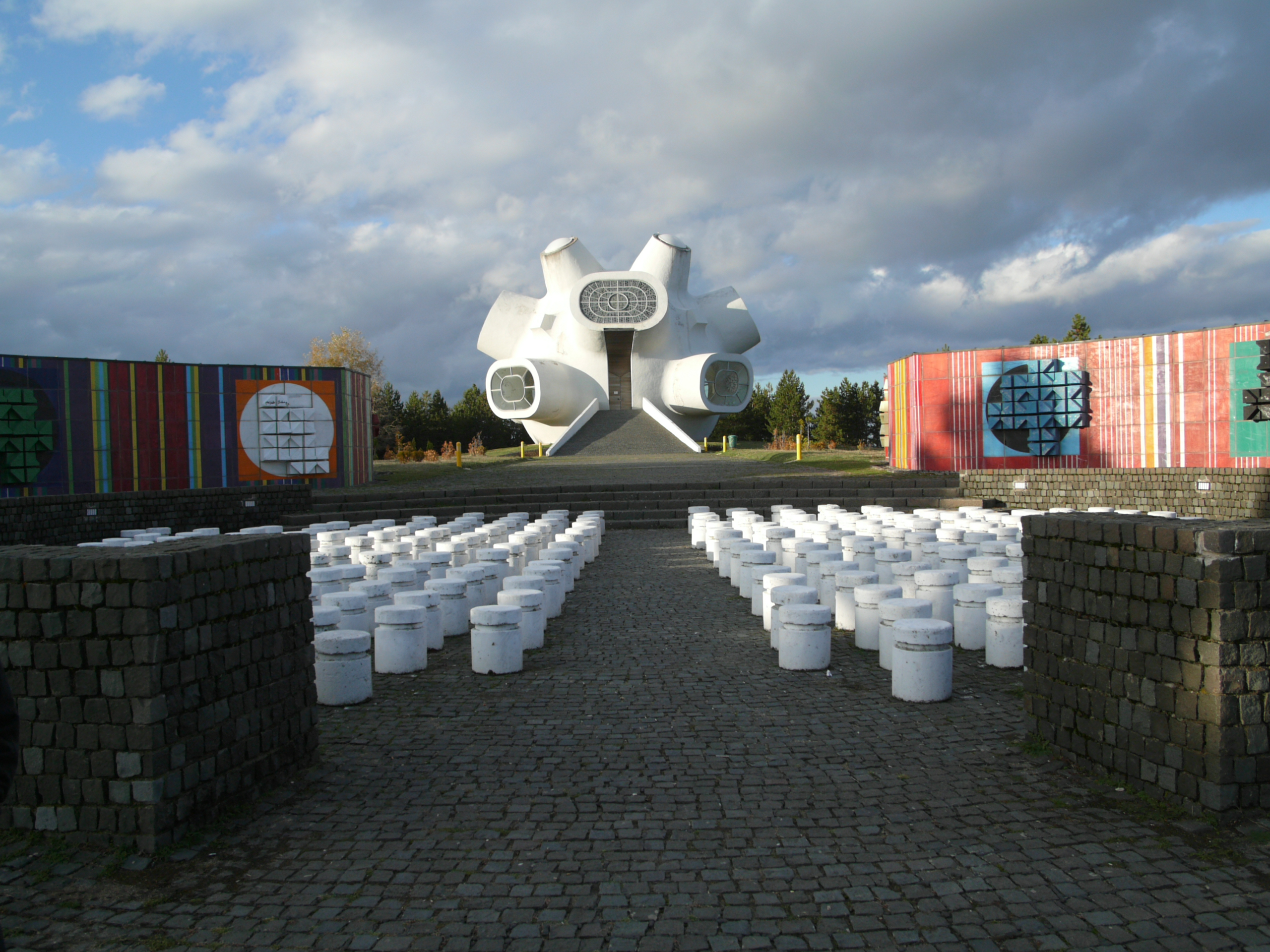
- The Macedonium monument in Kruševo commemorating the Ilinden Uprising of 1903
- Also called: Ilinden; St. Elijah Day
- Observed by: North Macedonia
- Type: National
- Significance: The day North Macedonia proclaimed its statehood in 1944; The day of the Ilinden Uprising and the proclamation of Kruševo Republic in 1903.
- Date: 2 August
- Next time: 2 August 2027
- Frequency: annual

Republic Day (Macedonian: Ден на Републиката, romanized: Den na Republikata) or Ilinden (Macedonian: Илинден) is a national holiday in North Macedonia. It is celebrated on 2 August, which is also a religious holiday – Ilinden (Macedonian: Илинден; St. Elijah day; the day is reckoned as 20 July according to the Julian Calendar). It commemorates two major events in the establishment of the statehood of the country which took place on this date:

- The Ilinden Uprising of 1903 which was organized by the Internal Macedonian Revolutionary Organization against the Ottoman Empire, and during which a short-lived Kruševo Republic was proclaimed;
- The First Session of ASNOM of 1944 at the Prohor Pčinjski Monastery, during the National Liberation Struggle, which laid the foundation of the SR Macedonia.

Macedonians have traditionally celebrated this day, also called Ilinden, because of its religious significance which has its roots in the Christian St. Elijah (Macedonian: Св. Илија, romanized: Sv. Ilija). It was proclaimed as a national holiday in the first session of ASNOM on 2 August 1944. The day was proclaimed as Republic Day in Democratic Federal Macedonia. The Prohor Pčinjski Monastery started hosting official commemorations since August 1969 after an agreement between the monastery's governing body and the Socialist Republic of Macedonia's State Secretariat for Education, Science and Culture on 26 May 1969, which permitted the Macedonian side to use the facilities of the monastery, in return for a financial compensation. In the early 1990s, during the breakup of Yugoslavia, Serbian nationalists began preventing delegations from the newly independent Republic of Macedonia (now North Macedonia) from visiting the monastery for the holiday. In 1998, they also removed plaques commemorating the event. The Serbian Orthodox Church also did not allow access to the monastery for official commemorations due to the dispute with the Macedonian Orthodox Church. Due to this, the Macedonian state built the ASNOM Memorial Center in the village of Pelince. The memorial center contains a replica of the room where the first session was held. The monastery was off-limits until the resolution of the dispute between the churches in 2022.

Major gatherings are held in the monasteries, and there is a march of horsemen from Skopje, the capital, to Kruševo, where during the Ilinden Uprising the Kruševo Republic was established. The main celebrations take place in Kruševo, in the area called Mečkin Kamen (Bear's Rock), where a major battle with the Ottoman Army took place in August 1903, and the ASNOM Memorial Center. Although it is a national holiday, ethnic Turks in the country have not related with it, seeing it as an expression of ethnic Macedonian identity.

== See also ==
- Public holidays in North Macedonia
