= Battle of Sliva =

1903 battle of the Ilinden–Preobrazhenie Uprising

Coordinates: 41°23′17″N 21°13′39″E

- Part of Ilinden–Preobrazhenie Uprising
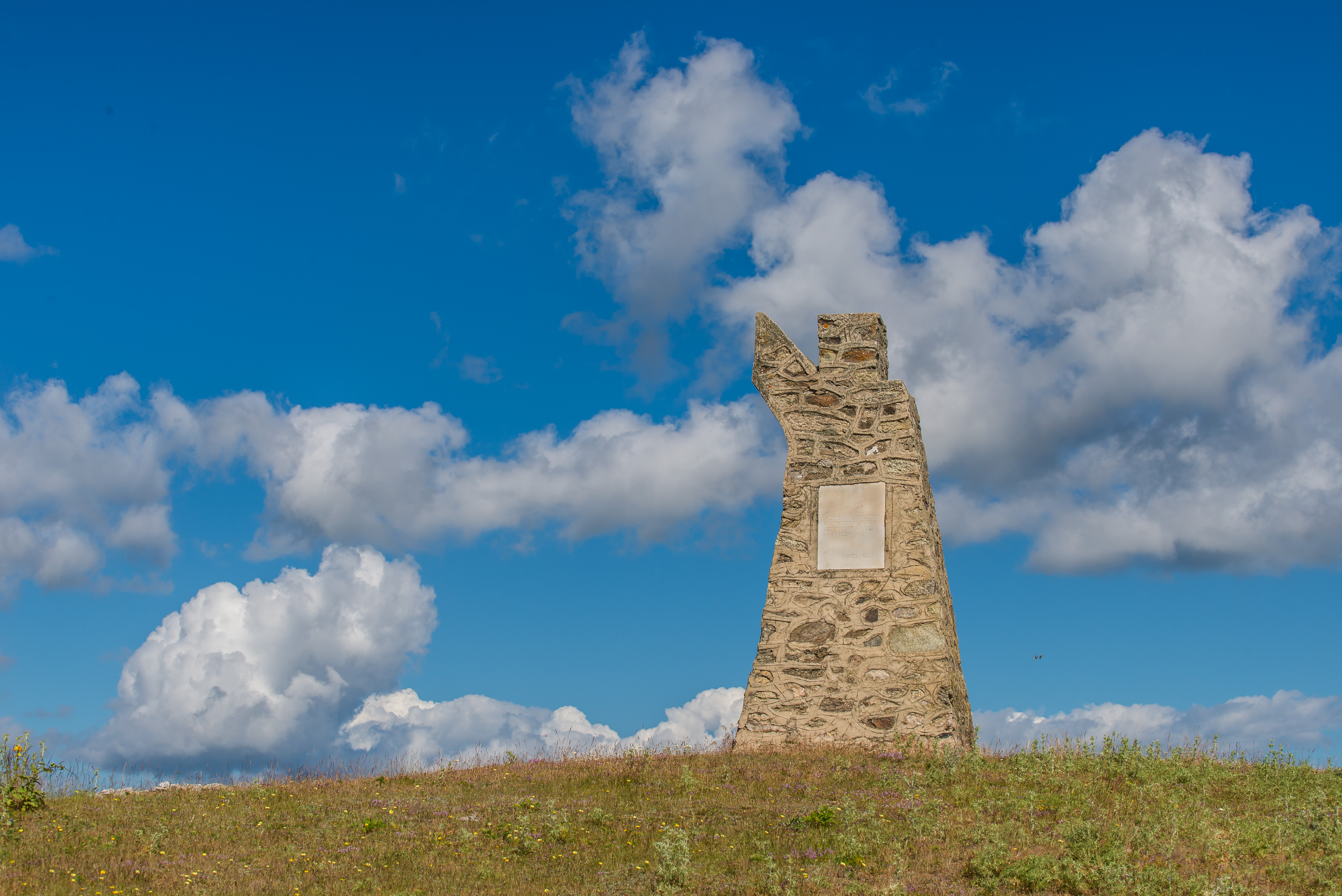
- The monument to the Battle of Sliva, Kruševo.
Location
Result
Kruševo, Kruševo Republic
Ottoman victory
- Subsequent collapse of the Kruševo Republic

Belligerents
Kruševo Republic; IMRO	Ottoman Empire

Commanders and leaders
Todor Hristov	(Ottoman Empire) Unknown

Casualties and losses
Unknown dead and wounded Some taken prisoner	Unknown

The Battle of Sliva occurred in an area known as Sliva in the city of Kruševo, in Ottoman Macedonia (now North Macedonia on August 12, 1903. It was an important episode of Ilinden–Preobrazhenie Uprising which occurred 10 days after the Kruševo Republic was proclaimed back on August 2, 1903, and eventually lead to the fall of the Republic and to the suppression of the uprising.

The Internal Macedonian Revolutionary Organisation was unorganised for this battle. Many 16- and 17-year-old men were also involved in this battle even though men were drafted at the age of 18 to join the army. This battle happened above a mountain with a height of 1,357 metres (4,452 ft) above sea level that was densely forested and was only a few kilometres from a popular area known as Meckin Kamen.

The battle saw the Ottoman Army up against the Kruševo Republic and the IMRO. The IMRO had a force of 500 to 600 revolutionaries commanded by Todor Hristov, while the Ottoman Army had a total of 3,000 to 3,100 soldiers.

The Ottoman Army army saw a victory over the rebels.
