= Todor Hristov (officer) =

Bulgarian military officer and revolutionary (1883–1903)

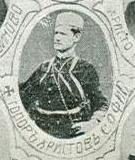
- Native name: Тодор Христов
- Nickname: "Little Officer"
- Born: January 20, 1883; Sofia, Bulgaria
- Died: September 21, 1903 (aged 20) Biljača, Ottoman Empire
- Allegiance: Kingdom of Bulgaria, IMARO, Krushevo Republic
- Branch: Bulgarian Army
- Rank: Second lieutenant
- Conflicts: Ilinden–Preobrazhenie Uprising

Todor Hristov, also known as "the Little officer", was a Bulgarian military officer, revolutionary, and Internal Macedonian-Adrianople Revolutionary Organization activist. He was a participant in the Ilinden Uprising and one of the members of the Forest Staff of the Krushevo Revolutionary Region.

== Biography ==
Hristov was born on January 20, 1883, in Sofia, Bulgaria. Some sources mistakenly claim that he was born in Veles, then in Ottoman Empire, because his parents were refugees from there. He studied at the Military School in Sofia, graduating in 1902 with the first prize for best achievement. Hristov began service in Fifth Cavalry Regiment in Sofia. There he joined the Bulgarian Officers' Brotherhoods. In the early spring of 1903, he left the military service and went to Macedonia, joining the Pitu Guli detachment operating in the Krusevo region. At the Smilevo Congress of the Bitola revolutionary district in May 1903, he was elected a member of the Forest Command and military leader of the uprising in Krushevo. During the Ilinden-Preobrazhenie Uprising in the summer of 1903, he was among the leaders of the defense of Krusevo Republic. At the end of the uprising, he tried to withdraw to Bulgaria together with a group of 18 rebels. They participated on September 21 in a battle near the village of Biljača, in today's Serbian municipality of Bujanovac. Todor Hristov and 11 other rebels were killed by the Ottomans.

== Gallery ==
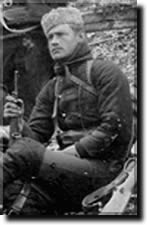
Todor Hristov near Kyustendil on 24 Mart, 1903.

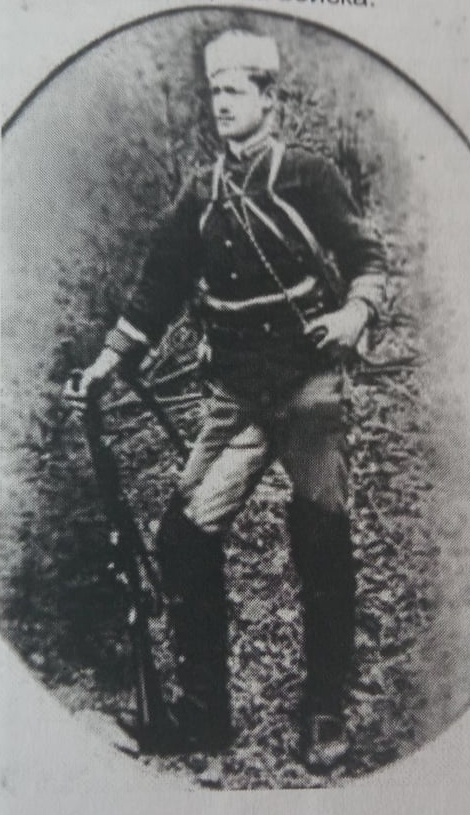
Todor Hristov in Sofia.

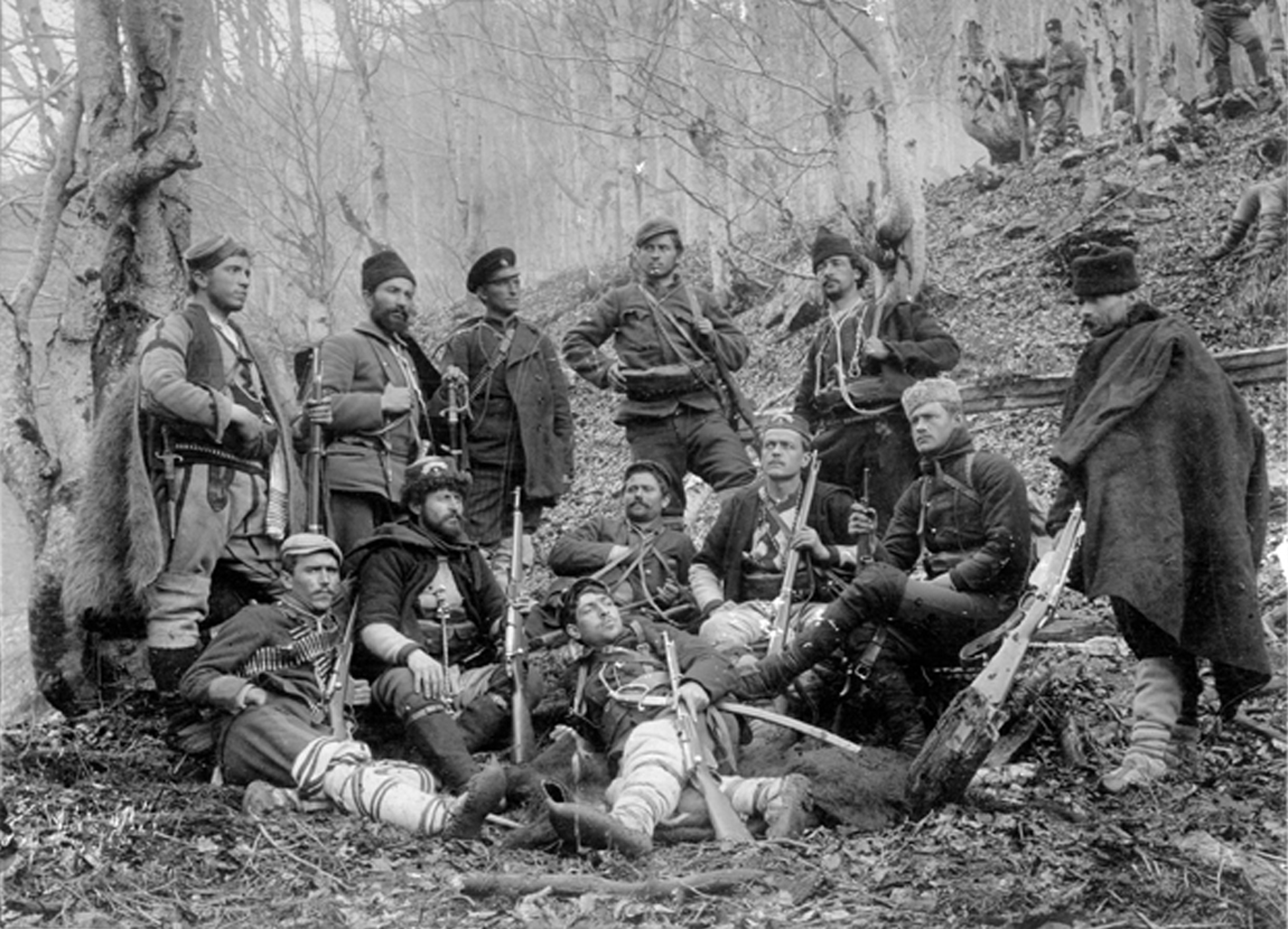
Activists of IMARO on a meeting near Kyustendil in March 1903.

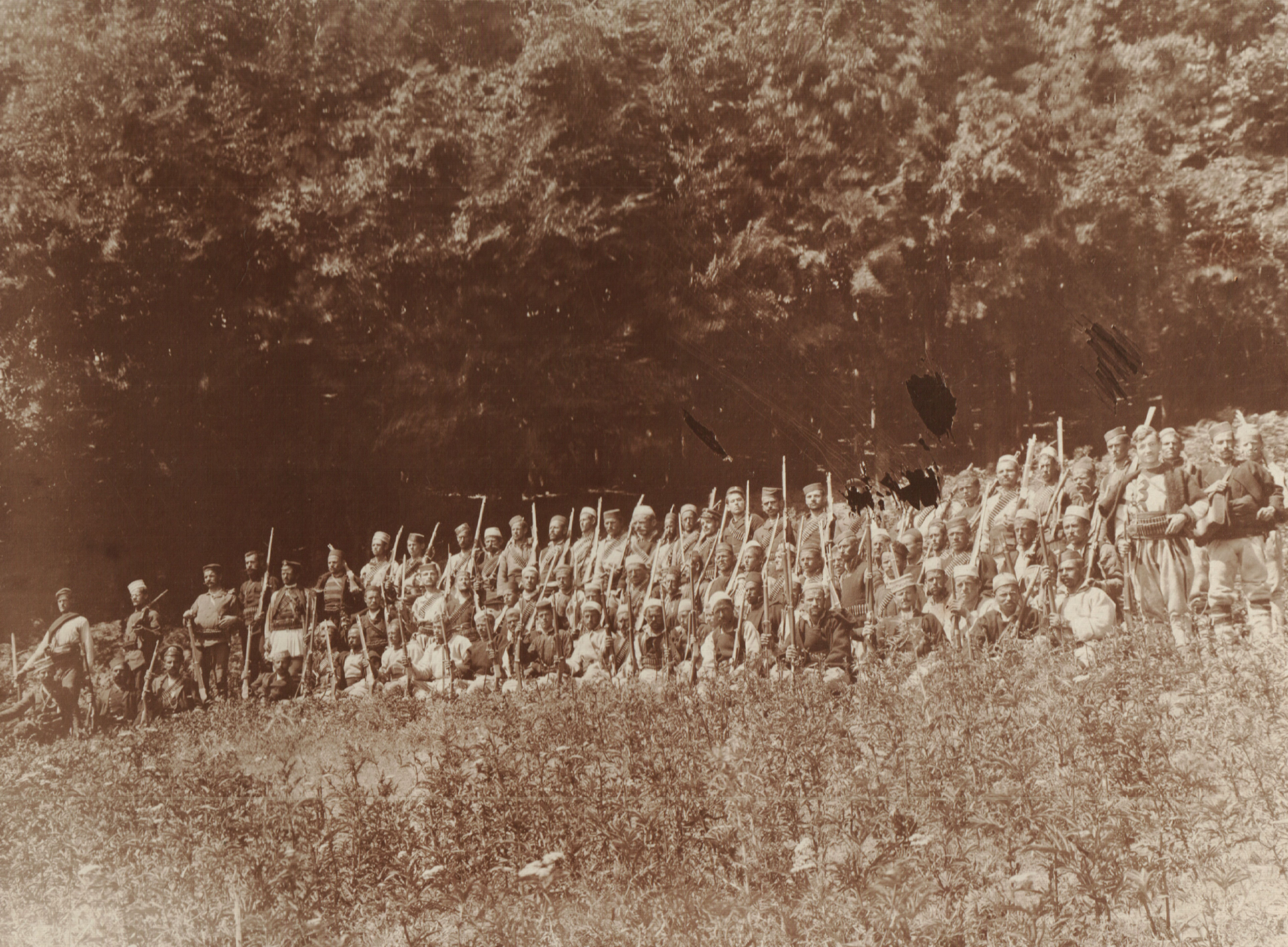
The detachment of T. Hristov during the uprising near Krushevo.
