= Dimo Todorovski =

Macedonian artist and sculptor

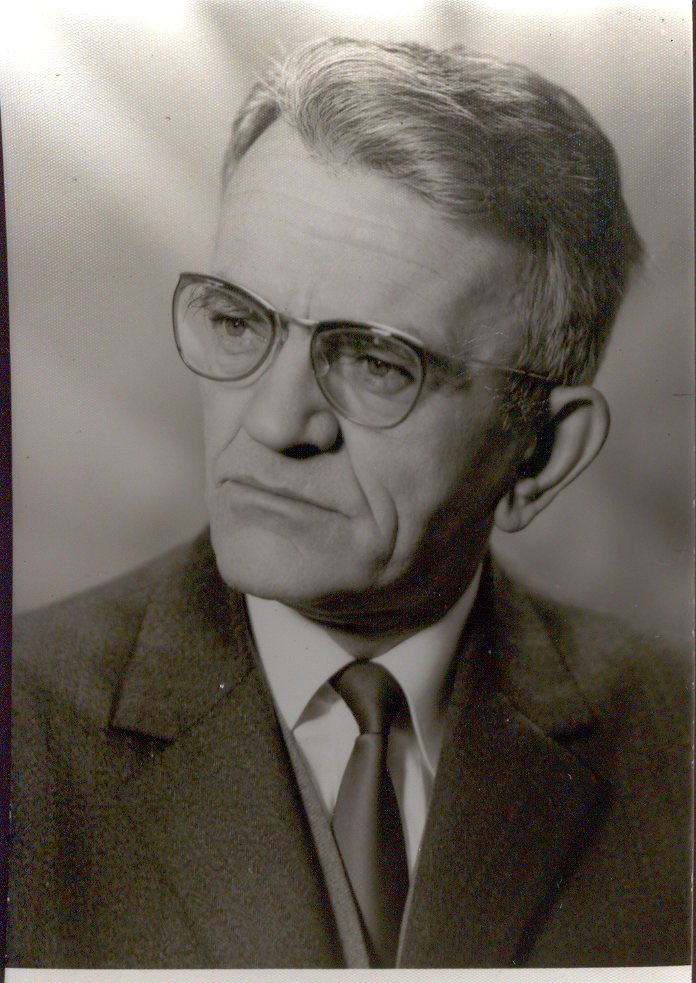
- Born: 11 December 1910; Thessaloniki, Salonica Vilayet, Ottoman Empire (today in Greece)
- Died: 23 April 1983 (aged 72); Skopje, SR Macedonia, SFR Yugoslavia (today in North Macedonia)
- Known for: Painting, Drawing, Sculpture
- Notable work: Mechkin Kamen

Dimo Todorovski (Macedonian: Димо Тодоровски; 1910 in Thessaloniki – 1983 in Skopje), was a prominent Macedonian artist and sculptor.

== Education and career ==
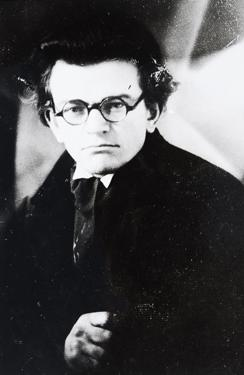
Young Dimo Todorovski

Two years after his birth, his family returned to his hometown of Prilep, then in Ottoman Empire. In 1917, his father died, and from 1920 to 1929 he resided in a Yugoslav Home for War Orphans in Bitola. In 1929–1935, he attended the art school in Belgrade. From 1945 to 1979, he contributed to the formation of an art school in Skopje and became one of the first professors, a position from which Todorovski retired in 1979. He was also a founding member of the art gallery in Skopje in 1949. In 1969 he was elected a corresponding member of the Macedonian Academy of Sciences and Arts.

== Artistic style ==
His artistic style varied between lyric and epic dramatic and realistic academic treatment of form.

== Accomplishments ==
His works are part of the national collection of the Museum of Contemporary Art in Skopje. During his life he realized a number of sculptures of different formats, portraits, and many public monuments around the country.

His most famous is the monument at Mečkin Kamen (Bear's Rock) memorial in Kruševo, which has turned into one of the national symbols of the Republic of North Macedonia.

He is considered to be the founder of Macedonian sculpting.

External links

- Works of Dimo Todorovski
