= Battle of Mečkin Kamen =

1903 Ottoman victory over the Ilinden-Preobrazhenie revolt

Coordinates: 41°22′N 21°14′E

- Part of Ilinden–Preobrazhenie Uprising
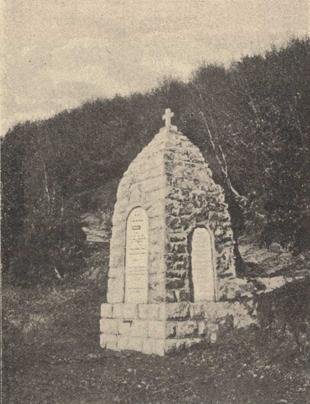
- The monument on the place of the battle of Mečkin Kamen built by the Bulgarian administration during the First World War and demolished by the Serbian authorities afterwards.
Date	12 August 1903
Location	Kruševo Republic (now Republic of North Macedonia)
Result	Ottoman victory

Belligerents
Kruševo Republic; IMRO	Ottoman Empire

Commanders and leaders
Nikola Karev; Pitu Guli †	(Ottoman Empire) Bahtiyar Paşa

Strength
230 insurgents	(Ottoman Empire) Unknown (18,000 soldiers overall in the capture of Kruševo)

Casualties and losses
40 killed	(Ottoman Empire) Unknown

The Battle of Mečkin Kamen also known as 'Battle of Mechkin Kamen' (Bulgarian: Битка при Мечкин Камен, Macedonian: Битка кај Мечкин Камен) occurred on the hill now known as Mečkin Kamen ("Bear's Stone"), a few kilometres south from the town of Kruševo on 12 August 1903. It was part of the Ilinden-Preobrazhenie Uprising, led by the Internal Macedonian-Adrianople Revolutionary Organisation (IMARO or VMARO) against the Ottoman Empire. The leading revolutionary commanders of the local Kruševo Republic were Nikola Karev and Pitu Guli. The battle is an important event that is celebrated in Bulgaria and North Macedonia.

Before the battle, Pitu Guli inspected his forces and found out that 70 out of the 300 men part of his unit did not have any weapons so he let them return home. Following the takeover, and subsequent declaration of the Krusevo Republic, the surrounding areas were besieged by the Ottoman forces for an estimated 10 days, with the forces of the Bulgarians and Aromanians being outnumbered and overrun. Following the Battle of Sliva and Mečkin Kamen, large parts of the Aromanian areas and villages were destroyed while 'the Bulgarian quarter' was mostly spared. Revolutionary Pitu Guli and most of his men were killed at the battle of Mečkin Kamen while Nikola Karev managed to break through the Turkish lines and escaped back to Bulgaria. The Turkish forces entered the town of Kruševo on 12 August 1903.

A monument exists today on Mečkin Kamen where Pitu Guli was killed. There is a World War II memorial by Dimo Todorovski at the same site.

A song commemorating the battle, "Mechkin Kamen", has been recorded by Andy Irvine and Davy Spillane on their 1992 album EastWind (as "The Bear's Rock"), on the 2004 Mozaik album Live from the Powerhouse, and on Bulgarian singer, Lilly Drumeva's 2010 album Lovin' you.

== Sources ==
- MI-AN Publishing, Skopje 1998, Macedonia Yesterday And Today.
