= Pitu Guli =

Aromanian revolutionary in Ottoman Macedonia (1865–1903)

Voivode Pitu Guli
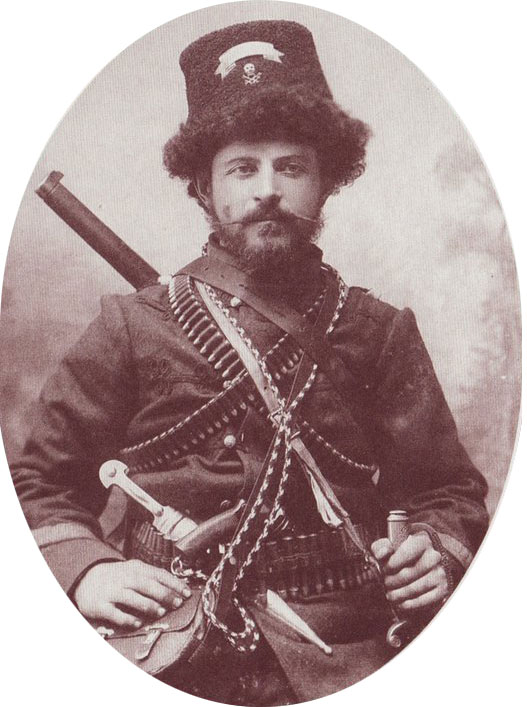
- Pitu Guli in guerilla attire
- Nickname: Pitu the Vlach
- Born: c. 1865; Kruševo, Ottoman Empire
- Died: 12 August 1903 (aged 37–38) Kruševo Republic
- Allegiance: IMRO; Kruševo Republic
- Service years: 1885–1903
- Conflicts: Ilinden-Preobrazhenie Uprising; Battle of Mečkin Kamen †

Pitu Guli (Note: Alternative spellings of his name are Pito (Пито) and Gule (Гуле) or Gulev (Гулев).) (Cyrillic: Питу Гули; (Note: His name is alternatively spelled in the older Bulgarian orthography as Пито Гулевъ.) 1865–1903) was an Aromanian revolutionary in Ottoman Macedonia, a local leader of what is commonly referred to as the Internal Macedonian Revolutionary Organization (IMRO).

== Life ==
He was born to a poor family in Kruševo (Aromanian: Crushuva) in the Ottoman Empire (now North Macedonia). Guli demonstrated an independent and rebellious nature early in life. He left his home in Macedonia at the age of 17 in search of wealth in the Bulgarian capital, Sofia. In 1885, he returned to Macedonia, as part of a rebel squad of the revolutionary movement against the Ottoman Empire, led by Adam Kalmikov. He was captured and exiled to eastern Anatolia for a period of eight years, of which seven years were spent in the prison in Trabzon. In 1895, he again returned to Kruševo and became a member of IMARO. From this time on, he was fully committed to the autonomy of Macedonia from Turkish rule. Between 1897 and 1902 he was again in Sofia, where he also held an eating house.

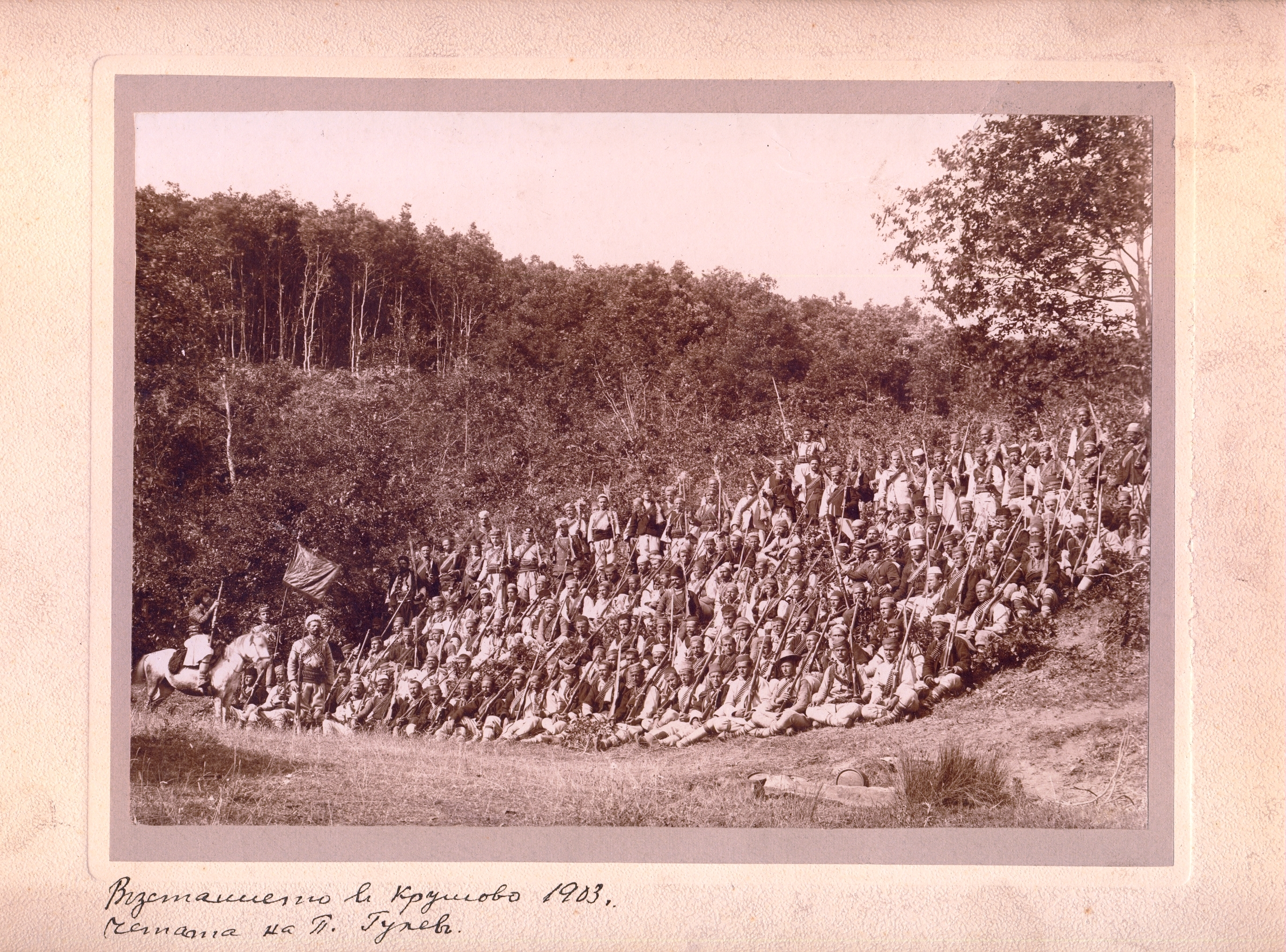
Pitu Guli and his cheta in 1903.

In March 1903, he began commanding a revolutionary squad, crossing the Bulgarian-Ottoman border heading for Kruševo. From April to August 1903, he trained and prepared his irregulars for the upcoming Ilinden Uprising. He died in the Battle of Mečkin Kamen, defending the Kruševo Republic.

== Family ==
Except for Bulgarian Exarchist Aromanians, as Guli's family, who were Bulgarophiles, most members of other ethnicities dismissed the IMRO as pro-Bulgarian. His sons were:

- Tashko Gulev (Shula Guli), a soldier of the Bulgarian Army who died in 1913 in the battle of Bregalnica against the Serbs, during the Second Balkan War.
- Nikola Gulev (Lakia Guli), IMRO revolutionary and one of the people closest to Todor Alexandrov. He was arrested by the police of Kingdom of Serbs, Croats and Slovenes and died in custody after being tortured in 1924.
- Steryo Gulev (Sterya Guli), who took part in the military units formed by former IMRO activists in Vardar Macedonia during the Bulgarian occupation in World War II, to fight the communist Yugoslav Partisans. He reportedly shot himself after Bulgaria switched sides and withdrew from Yugoslavia in 1944, upon the arrival of Tito's partisans in Kruševo, in despair over what he saw as a second period of Serbian dominance in Macedonia.

== Legacy ==
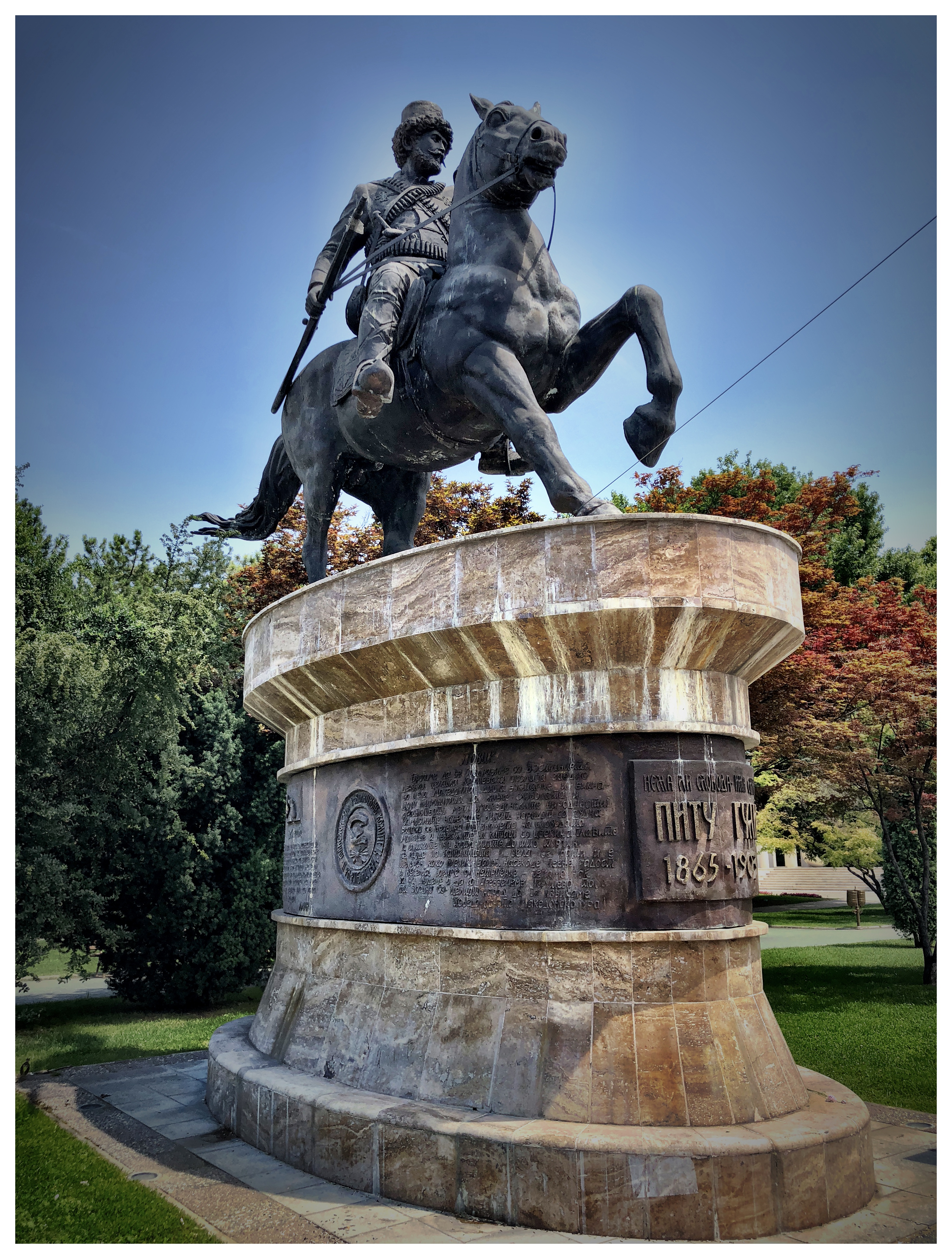
Monument of Pitu Guli in the Macedonian capital city Skopje.

Pitu Guli is a national hero in North Macedonia and Bulgaria, and remembered as having fought heroically at Mečkin Kamen (Bear's Rock) near Kruševo, where he was killed during the Ilinden Uprising in defense of the Macedonian Kruševo Republic. A Macedonian Partisan brigade was named after him. The Macedonian partisan Kuzman Josifovski took the alias "Pitu" after him. He is also celebrated in folk songs and poetry throughout the region of Macedonia, being mentioned in the national anthem of North Macedonia ("Denes nad Makedonija", "Today over Macedonia"). An Aromanian-language song about him, Cãnticlu al Pitu Guli ("The Song of Pitu Guli"), has also been composed.
