= Ilinden (memorial) =

Monument complex in Kruševo, North Macedonia

- Илинден (Macedonian)
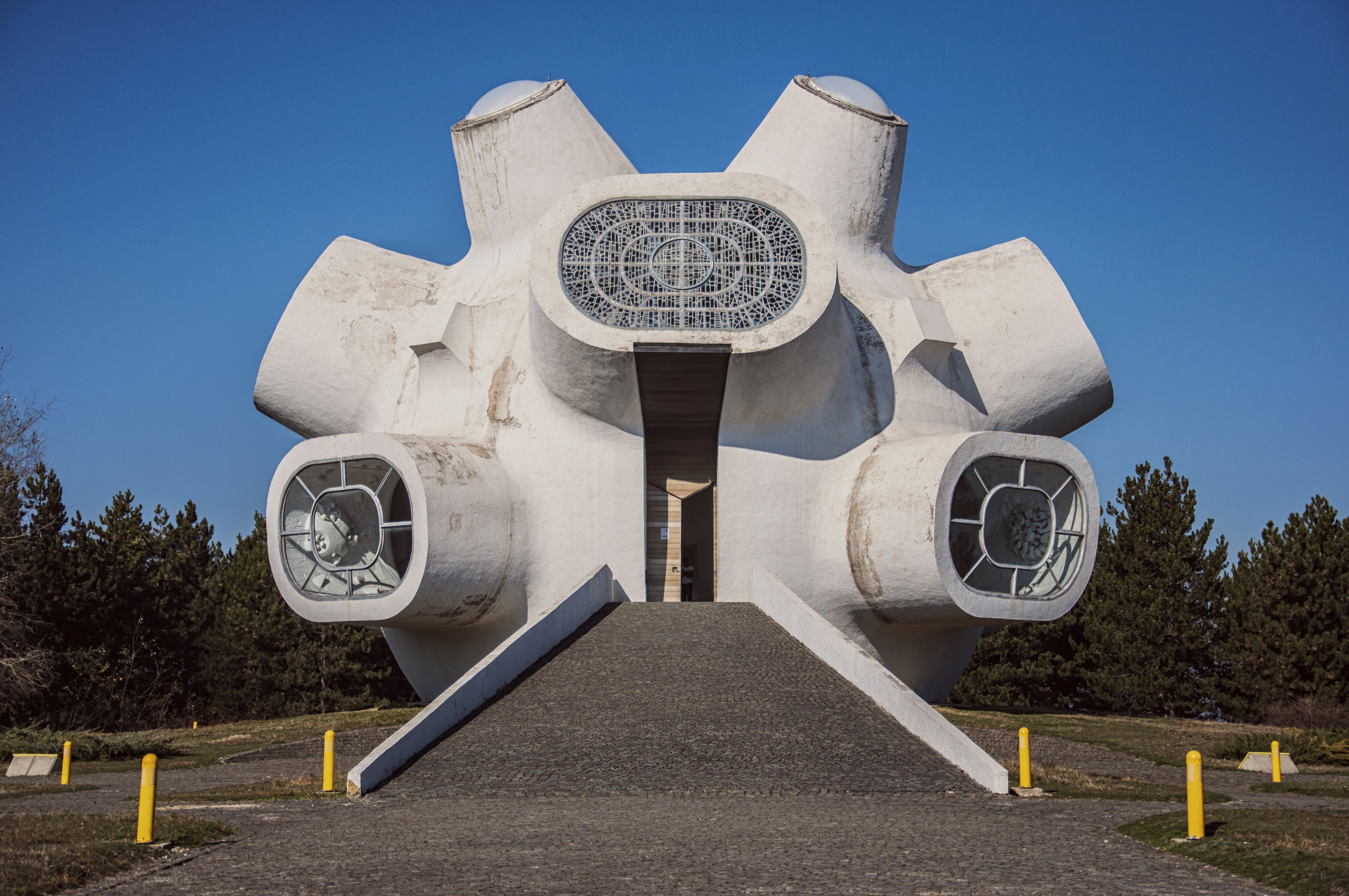
- Artist: Jordan Grabuloski and Iskra Grabuloska
- Year: 1974
- Type: Sculpture
- Location: Kruševo; 41.3774°N 21.2484°E

Ilinden, also known as Makedonium (Macedonian: Споменик „Илинден“ or Македониум), is a monument in Kruševo, North Macedonia. It was officially opened on August 2 of 1974, on the 30th anniversary of the Second Session of the Anti-fascist Assembly for the National Liberation of Macedonia and the 71st anniversary of the 1903 Ilinden uprising. The designers of the monument are Jordan Grabuloski and Iskra Grabuloska.

It is dedicated to all the IMARO revolutionaries who participated in the Ilinden uprising, as well as communist Yugoslav partisans of the World War II in Yugoslav Macedonia (1941–1944).

== Description ==
The monument's grounds cover 5 hectares (12 acres). The building has a rounded shape with protruding oval windows. The upper windows are made of stained glass.

Inside the dome is the tomb of Nikola Karev, president of the Kruševo Republic, and the bust of the singer Toše Proeski. The interior of the dome has four windows, each facing a different direction including the locations associated with the Ilinden-related events ″Sliva″ Memorial, Bear stone and Pelagonija.

The memorial complex also features a plateau with series of sculptures named "Breaking the Chains", symbolizing freedom won in the liberation wars. There is also a crypt with the carved names and important events related to the period before, during and after the Ilinden uprising. The last component is the amphitheater decorated with colorful mosaics.

== Gallery ==
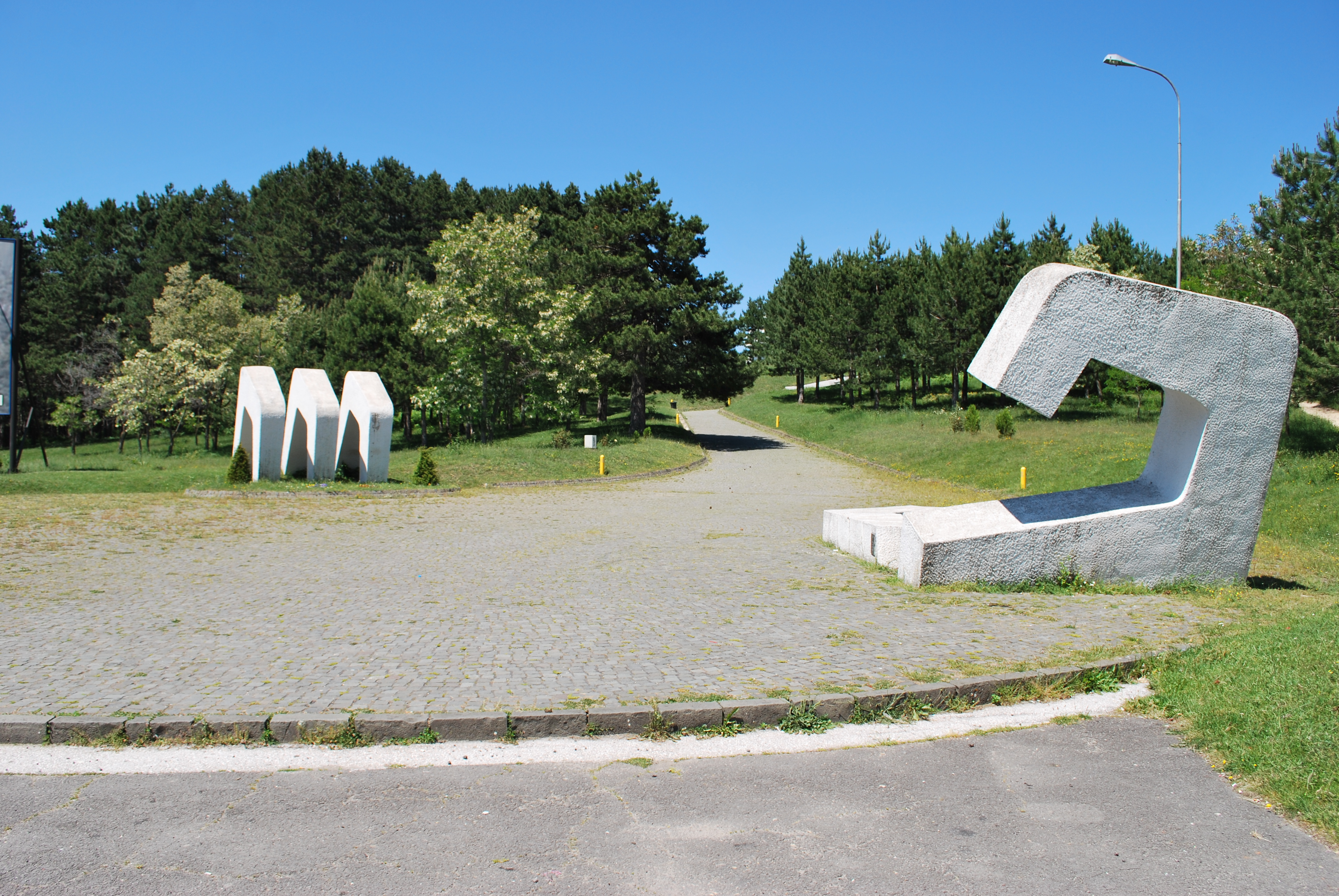
"Breaking the Chains", symbol of freedom

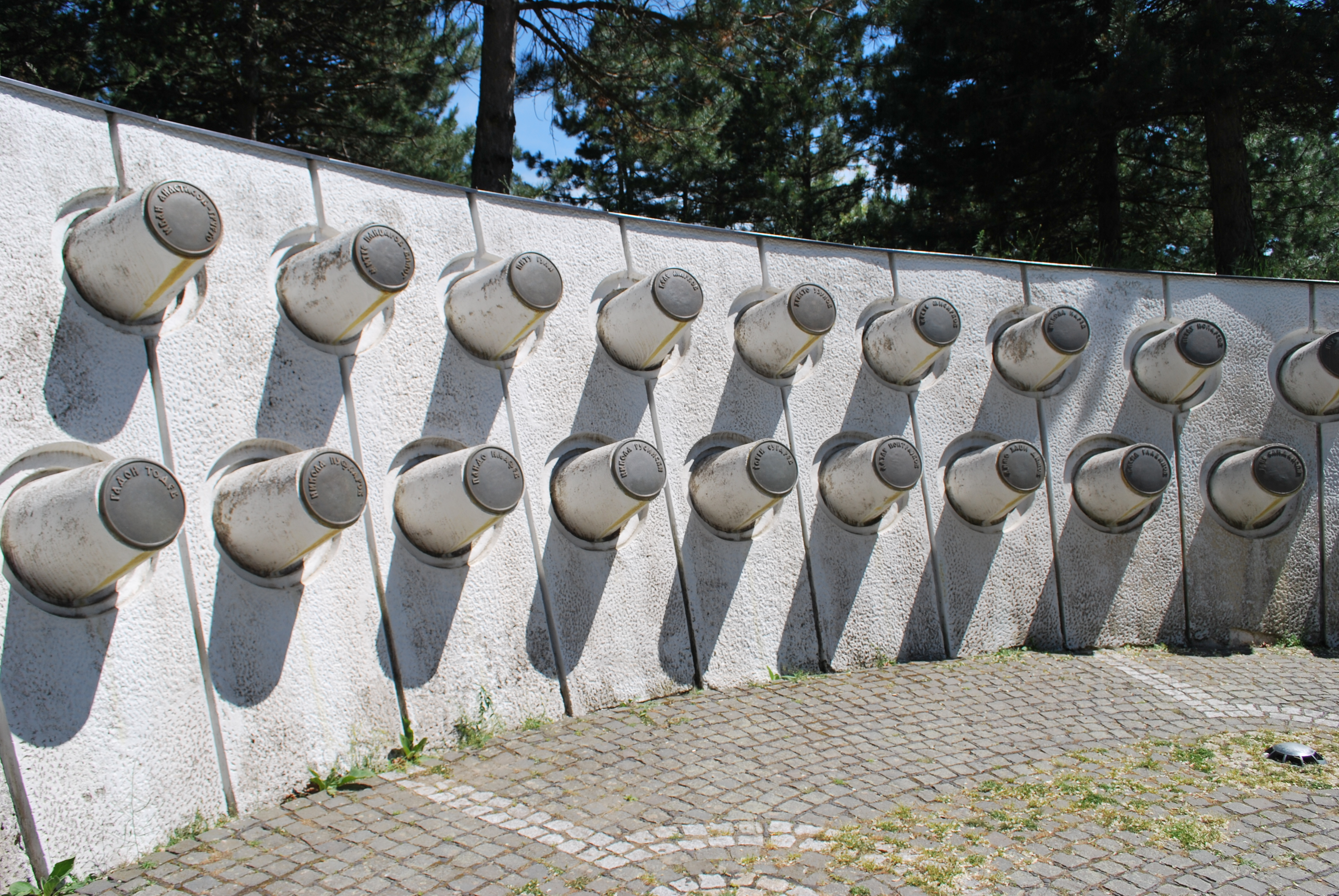
Crypt

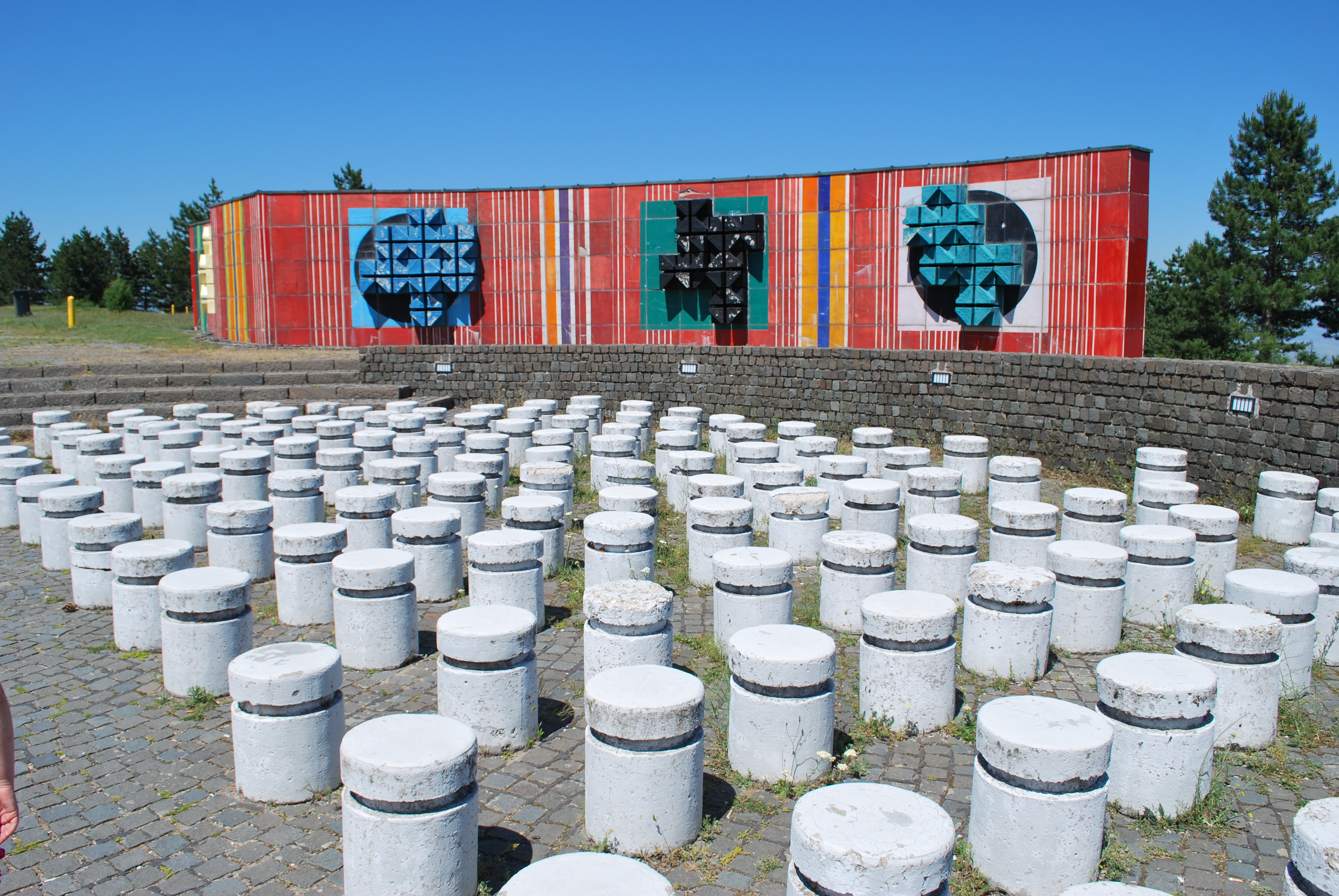
Amphitheater

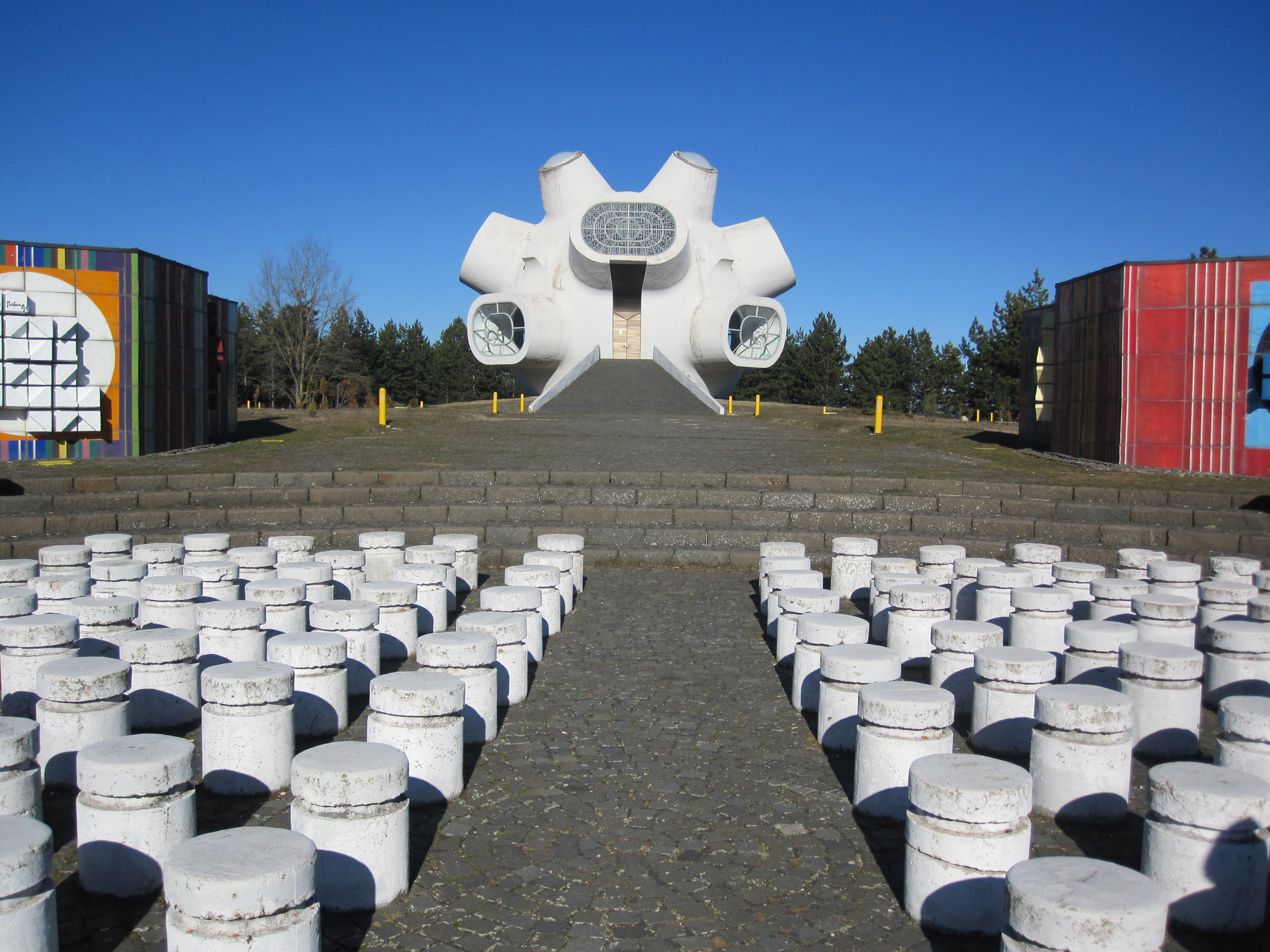
Amphitheater and "Makedonium"

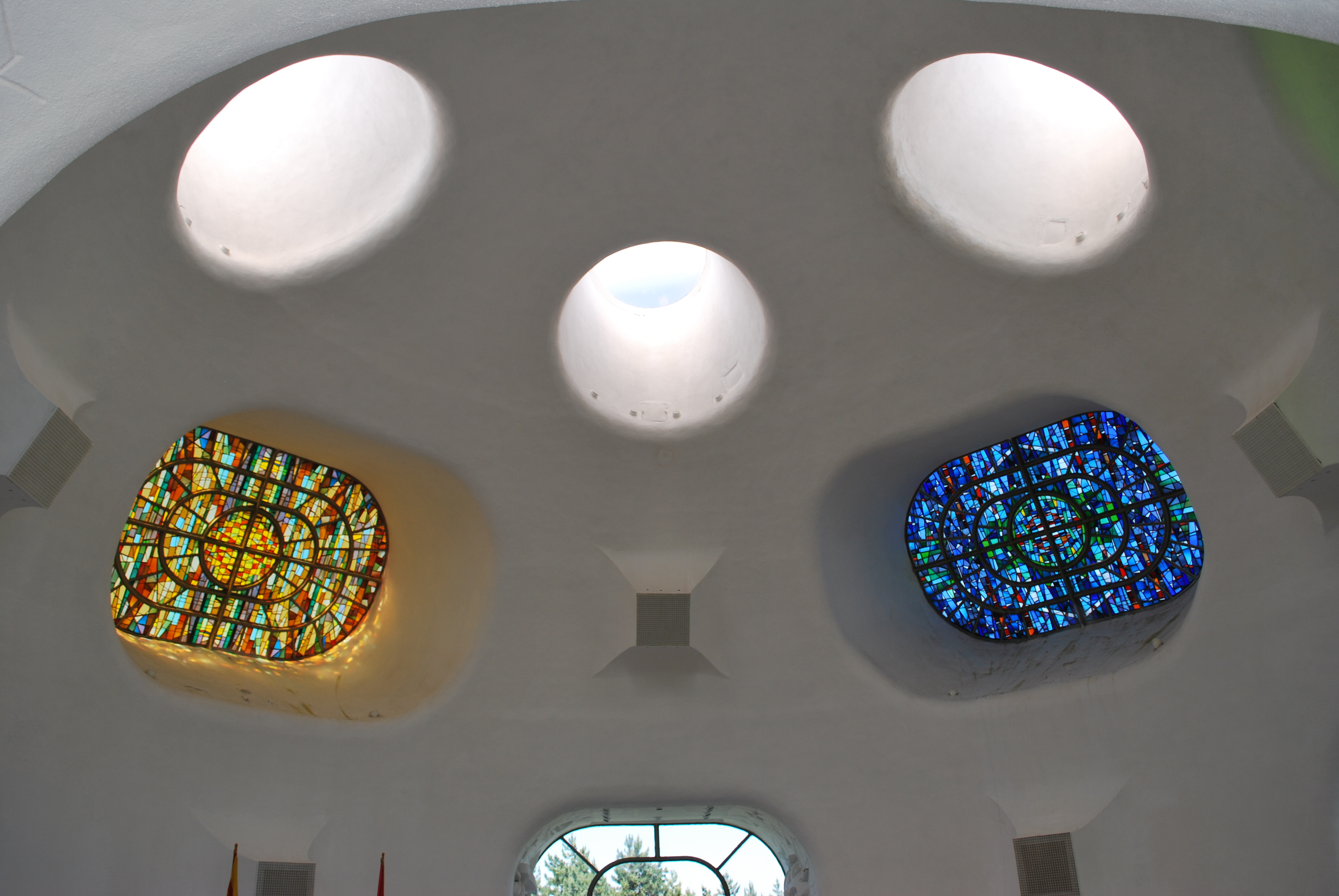
Interior of the monument

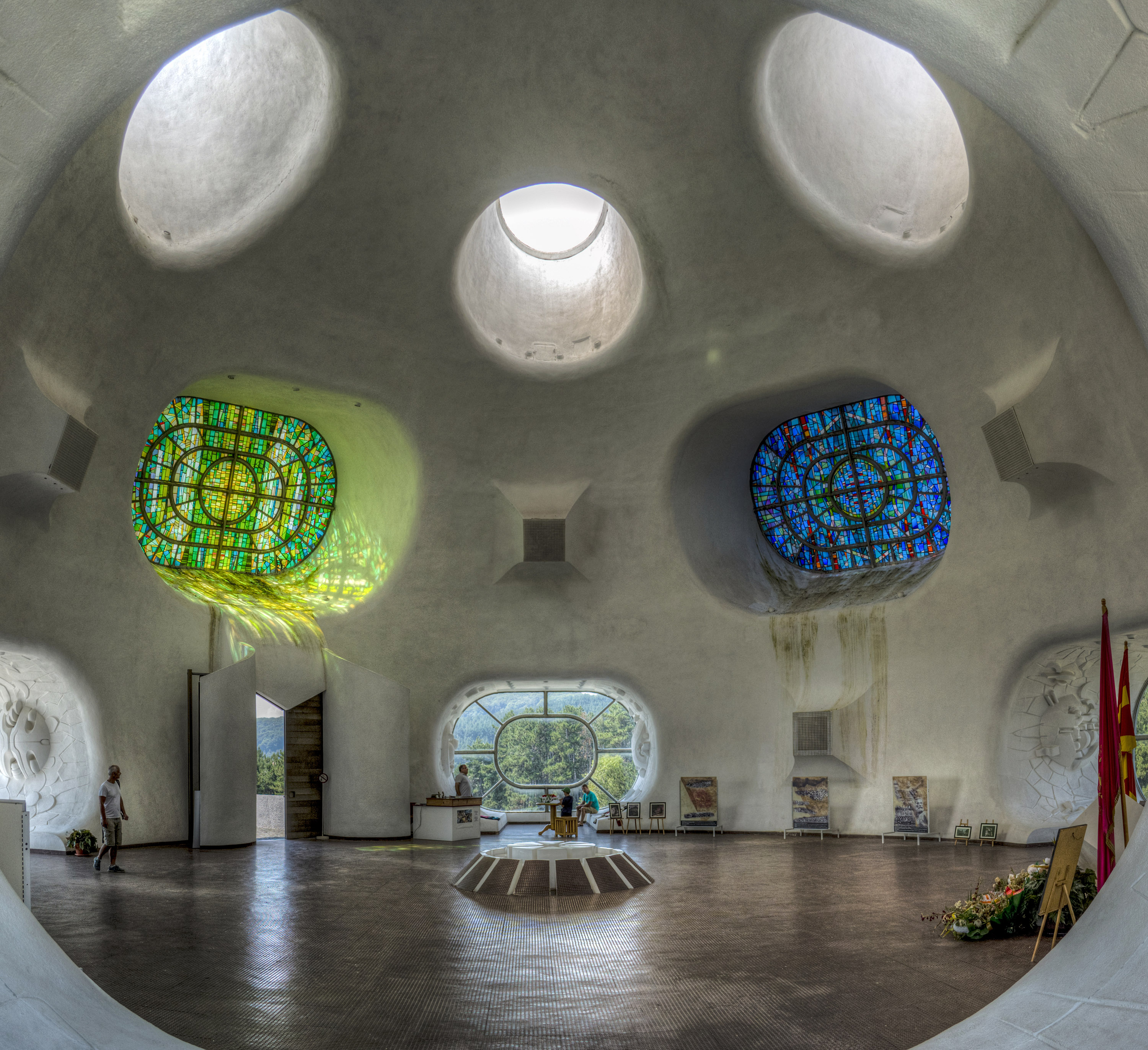
interior of the monument

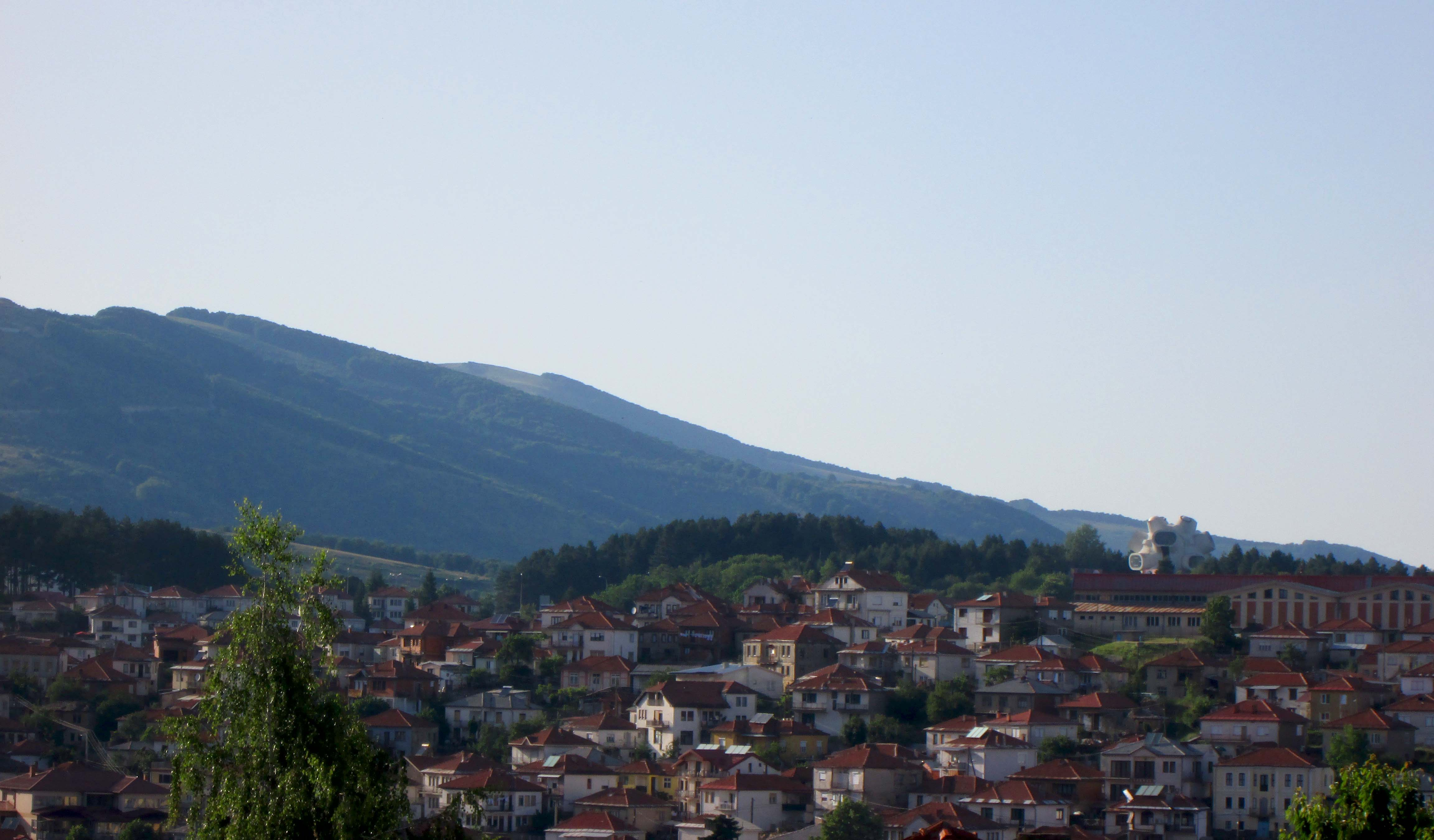
The Makedonium on top of Kruševo

== See also ==
- List of World War II monuments and memorials in North Macedonia
