= Nikola Karev =

Macedonian Bulgarian revolutionary (1877–1905)

- Никола Карев
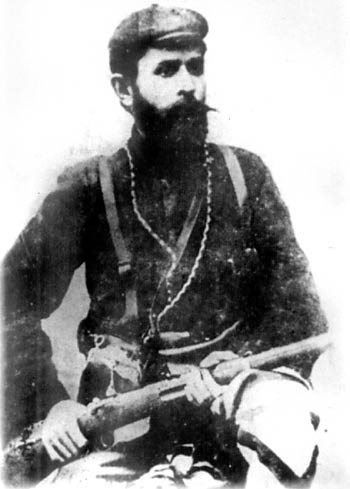

President of Krusevo Republic
- In office August 3, 1903 – August 13, 1903

Personal details
- Born: November 23, 1877 Kırşova, Ottoman Empire
- Died: April 27, 1905 (aged 27) Near Rayçani, Ottoman Empire
- Profession: Teacher

Nikola Yanakiev Karev (Bulgarian: Никола Янакиев Карев; Macedonian: Никола Јанакиев Карев, romanized: Nikola Janakiev Karev; November 23, 1877 – April 27, 1905) was a Macedonian Bulgarian socialist revolutionary of the Internal Macedonian Revolutionary Organization (IMRO). He was also a teacher in the Bulgarian Exarchate school system in his native area, and a member of the Bulgarian Workers' Social Democratic Party. During the Ilinden Uprising he headed the short-lived Kruševo Republic. He is considered a national hero in North Macedonia and Bulgaria.

== Biography ==
=== Early years ===
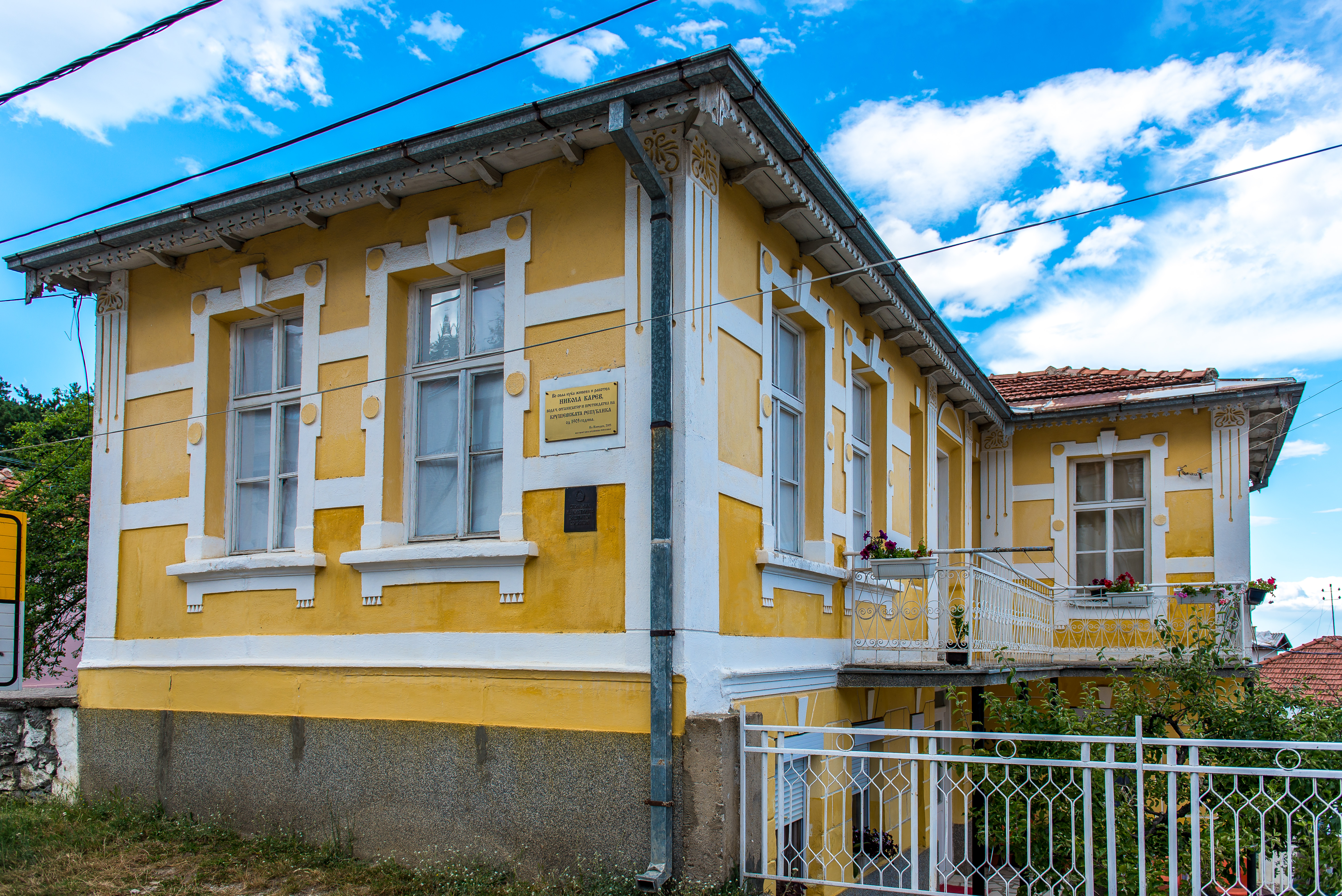
Karev's birth house in Kruševo, now a memorial house.

Karev completed his early education at the Bulgarian Exarchist school in Kruševo and in 1893 moved to Sofia, the capital of Principality of Bulgaria, where he worked as a carpenter for the socialist Vasil Glavinov. Karev joined the Socialist group led by Glavinov, and through him, made acquaintance of Dimitar Blagoev and other socialists, and became a member of the Bulgarian Workers' Social Democratic Party. From 1896 he participated in the Macedonian-Adrianople Social Democratic Group, created as part of the Bulgarian Workers' Social-Democrat Party. In 1898 Karev went back to Ottoman Macedonia and graduated from the Exarchist gymnasium in Bitola. From 1900 he worked as a schoolmaster in the Exarchist schools in the village of Gorno Divjaci and in his native Kruševo.

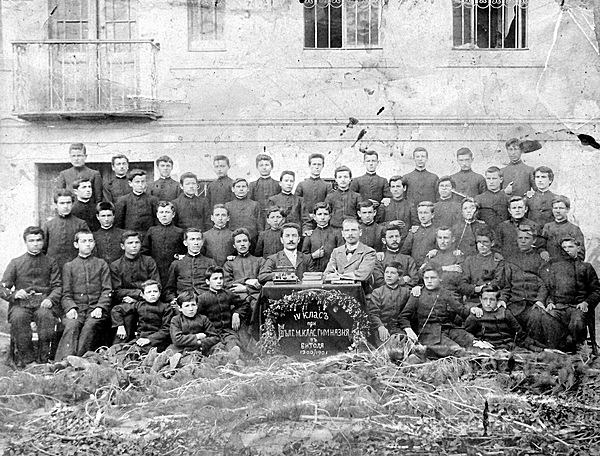
Photograph of the 1900–1901 graduates from the Bulgarian Exarchist Gymnasium in Bitola, among whom was Nikola Karev.

=== Political and revolutionary activity ===
The first Conference of Macedonian Socialists was held on June 3, 1900, near Kruševo, where they defined the core aspects of the potential creation of a separate Macedonian Republic, as a cantonized state, part of a future Balkan Socialist Federation, as a multinational polity offering equal rights to all its citizens. They maintained the slogan "Macedonia for the Macedonians", using Macedonian people as an umbrella term covering Bulgarians, Turks, Greeks, Aromanians, Albanians, Jews, Serbs, ethnic Macedonians, etc., living in harmony in an independent state. In this period Karev joined the Internal Macedonian Revolutionary Organization and became a leader of a regional armed band (cheta).

On the eve of the Ilinden–Preobrazhenie Uprising, in May 1903, he was interviewed in Bitola by the correspondent of the Greek daily Akropolis Stamatis Stamatiou. In the interview, Karev expressed his position of a radical leftist. Stamatiou described him as a Bulgarized Macedonian. (Note: Per Chavdar Marinov at the eve of the 20th century the treatment of the Greek society towards the Macedonian Slavs was changed. Until then they were accepted as Bulgarians, but after the aggravation of the Bulgarian-Greek relations on the Macedonian question, it was "proved" that the Macedonian Slavs were in fact Greeks, and that their language was not Bulgarian. The name Bulgarians also was taken out of use for them. At the time, the Greek researchers claimed that the Slavophones were simply Slavicized Greeks. This idea suggests that the Macedonian Slavs had lost their original Greek language and culture over the centuries, and it was time to them to return to their Hellenic roots. For the Greek audience the Macedonian Slavs were in historical aspect Ancient Macedonians (i.e. Greeks), not related to the Bulgarians. They were labelled as Bulgarian-speaking Greeks and even Slavic-speaking "Macedonians". For more see: Tchavdar Marinov, "Famous Macedonia, the Land of Alexander: Macedonian Identity at the Crossroads of Greek, Bulgarian and Serbian Nationalism", In: Entangled Histories of the Balkans - Volume One, pp: 290–291.) Per Stamatiou, Karev presented himself as a voulgarofron, (i.e. Bulgarophile), and replied he was a Macedonian. (Note: "Per Eleftheria Vambakovska, the interview, contains contradictory claims and actually begins with an illogical claim. Karev asserts he is a Bulgarian-minded ("Bulgarophron"), and on the first question of the reporter: "Are you a Macedonian", he answers with "yes". The reporter and the Greek audience then, regarded Macedonia as a Greek territory and hence the people living here, according to them, must be Greeks and descendants of Alexander the Great. That's why he was so persistently trying to persuade Karev, that he is Macedonian, i.e. Greek. And if he was not a Greek, then he is "Voulgarophron", "Bulgarized Macedonian", etc. Otherwise, it is easy to see that the interview was adopted for the Greek readers in 1903. The interview begins with a question "are you a Macedonian"? that means Karev's ethnic origin was more important for the interviewer – whether he is a "Macedonian", which to the Greeks was a synonymous of a "Greek". Otherwise, to the Greeks "Bulgarian-minded" was not so important – the conviction is acquirable and it can by changed. "Bulgarophron", literally translated would mean – a man who thinks like all the Bulgarians. Today the Greeks have a similar term – ethnicophronos, which has similar meaning, namely – a man who thinks on his own nation – nationalist, a Greek who thinks about Greece. Today the Macedonians in Aegean Macedonia (Greece) call their countrymen who became hellenized, i.e. Greeks – ethnicophronos. The journalist, and not only he, regards Macedonia as a Greek territory and hence the people living here, according to them, must be Greeks, descendants of Alexander the Great. That's why he is so persistently trying to persuade Karev, that he is Greek. And if he is not a Greek, then he is "Bulgarophonos", "Bulgarian Macedonian", etc. Otherwise, it is easy to see that the interview is "slightly tuned", adapted for the Greek readers in 1903." For more see: Утрински Весник, Сабота, July 22, 2000 Архивски Број 329. По откривањето на интервјуто на Никола Карев за 'Акрополис' во 1903. Одважноста на претседателот на Крушевската Република. Елефтерија Вамбаковска, Глигор Стојковски; Академик Катарџиев, Иван. Верувам во националниот имунитет на македонецот, интервју за списание "Форум", 22 jули 2000, број 329.) In response to an ironic question by Stamatiou whether he is a direct descendant of Alexander the Great, Karev answered positively, but added that "history says he was a Greek". (Note: Tassos Kostopoulos compares Stamatiou's distrust towards Karev's self-presentation with the profession of a "purely Macedonian consciousness" of the Bulgarian Army colonel Anastas Yankov during his short passage through Greece on his way back from Macedonia to Bulgaria in December 1902, after the failed Gorna Dzhumaya Uprising, which, contrary to Karev's, was received cordially by Greek nationalists and taken at face value even by the most Slavophobe Greek newspapers. See Tassos Kostopoulos, Faire la police dans un pays etranger, pp. 5-6, n. 21.. Per Tchavdar Marinov the manifesto issued by Anastas Yankov during the Gorna Dzhumaya Uprising promulgated only a specific “local Macedonian” patriotism, a phenomenon that was described at the beginning of the twentieth century by foreign observers such as Henry Noel Brailsford and Allen Upward. They likewise noted the legend that Alexander the Great and Aristotle were “Bulgarians.” Obviously, by the late Ottoman period, the ancient glory of the region was exploited for self-legitimation by groups with different loyalties—Greek as well as Bulgarian. At that time the anarchist Pavel Shatev described the first vestiges of the process of an ethno-national differentiation between Bulgarian and Macedonian, while some people he met felt “only Bulgarians”, but others despite being Bulgarians "by nationality", felt themselves Macedonians above all. It was generating a new identity that, during that period, was still not necessarily exclusive vis-à-vis Greek or Bulgarian national belonging. Marinov claims that people as Yankov, although Bulgarians by national identification and Macedonian supranationalist by political conviction, began to promote rarely the prognostics of some different ethnicity, which after the First World War were transformed into definitive Macedonian nationalism. For more see: Tchavdar Marinov, "Famous Macedonia, the Land of Alexander: Macedonian Identity at the Crossroads of Greek, Bulgarian and Serbian Nationalism", In: Entangled Histories of the Balkans - Volume One, pp: 293–294; 304.) Furthermore, he explained that IMRO was not Bulgarian and it just seemed like that because only Bulgaria appeared eager to help them. He also pointed out that Bulgaria's expectation to annex the region was miscalculated, and that the revolutionaries would accept anyone's help in order to attain their goal. When asked what the revolutionaries wanted for Macedonia, Karev explained their plans to create a republic in the model of Switzerland, providing autonomy and democracy for its different "races".

During the Ilinden Uprising of August 1903, after Kruševo was captured by the rebels, they proclaimed the Kruševo Republic and he became the president of its provisional government. Karev allegedly authored the Kruševo Manifesto, which called upon the local Muslim population to join forces with the Christians in the struggle for an independent Macedonia. Amongst the various ethno-religious groups (millets) in Kruševo a Republican Council was elected with 60 members – 20 representatives from each one: Bulgarian Exarchists, Aromanians and Greeks (Aromanian and Albanian Greek Patriarchists or Grecomans). The Council also elected an executive body – the Provisional Government, with six members (2 from each mentioned group). Though, an identity problem arose, Karev allegedly called all the members of the local Council "brother Bulgarians", while the IMRO insurgents flew Bulgarian flags, killed several Greek Patriarchists, accused of being Ottoman spies, and subsequently assaulted the local Turk and Albanian Muslims. Karev himself tried to minimize the attacks on the Muslims and prevent the insurgents from looting indiscriminately. On 12 August by the orders of the General Staff of the uprising, he retreated with most of the insurgents in the hills before the Ottoman troops encirclement. Lasting only ten days, the Kruševo Republic was crushed by the Ottoman forces after some intense fighting.

=== After Ilinden ===
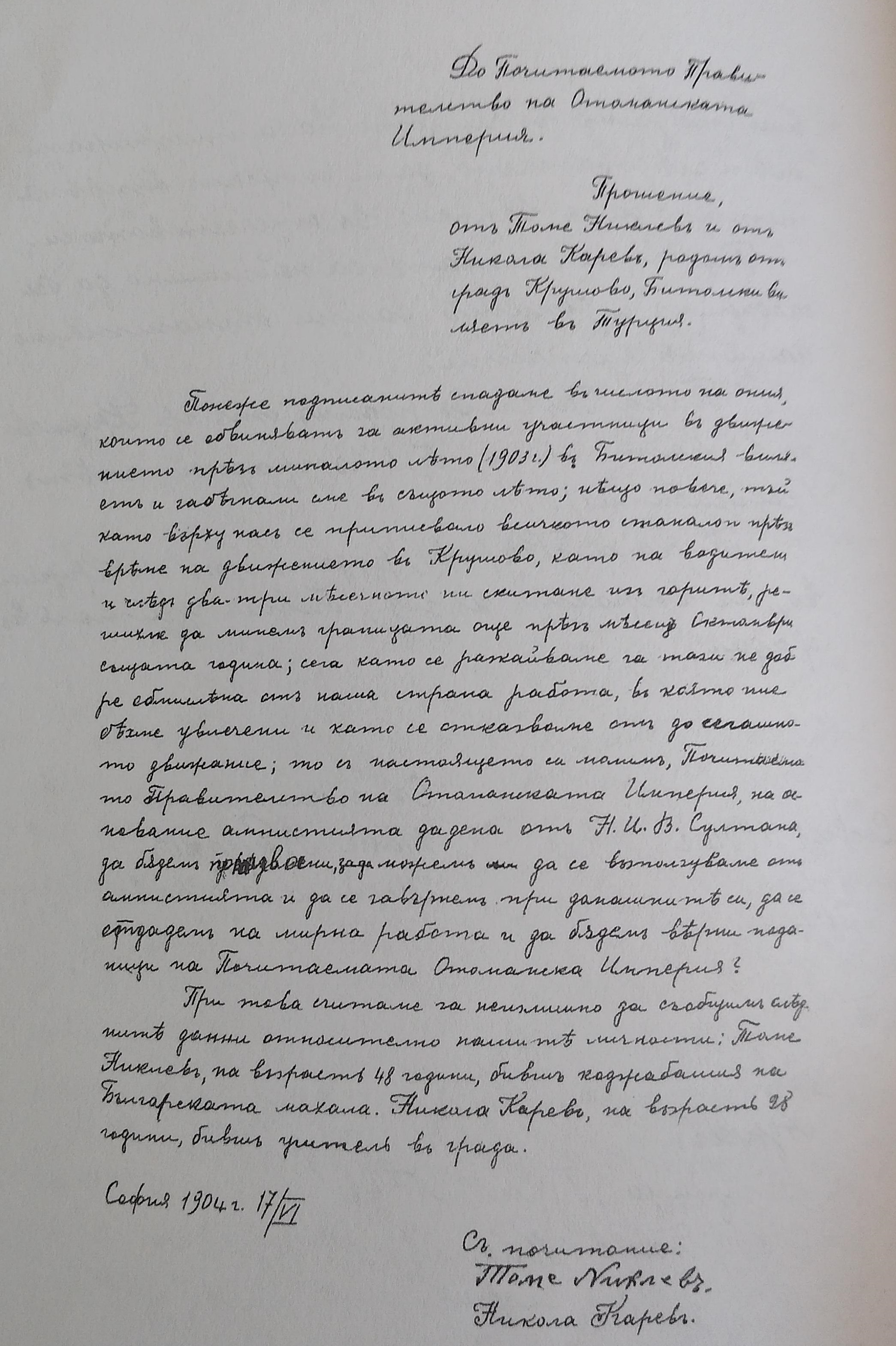
Petition for pardon by Toma Niklev and N. Karev to the Ottoman Government from June 1904; (in Bulgarian).

After the uprising Karev went back to Bulgaria and became a political activist of the newly founded Marxist Bulgarian Social Democratic Workers' Party (Narrow Socialists). In 1904, Karev made a legal attempt to return to Macedonia, taking advantage of the Bulgarian-Ottoman Amnesty Agreement for the participants in the Ilinden Uprising. He sent several applications for amnesty to Istanbul through the cabinet of the Bulgarian Prime Minister Racho Petrov. The applications were received by the Ottoman Amnesty Commission but remained unanswered, despite the intercession of the Bulgarian diplomatic agent in Istanbul, Grigor Nachovich.

On March 16, 1905, the chetas of Nikola Karev and Petar Atsev passed through the Kyustendil checkpoint of the IMARO and entered Ottoman territory. Soon after, Karev's detachment was discovered by Ottoman soldiers, and in the ensuing battle he was killed near the village of Rajčani, together with his comrades Dimitar Gyurchev and Krastyo Naumov.

=== Family ===
His two brothers, Petar and Georgi also participated in IMRO. During World War II, in the Bulgarian-annexed Vardar Macedonia, Georgi became briefly a Mayor of Kruševo in 1941. In late 1944, after SR Macedonia's authorities came to power he was arrested and trialed as a Bulgarian fascists' collaborator. He served his sentence in the Idrizovo prison and died there in 1949 or 1951, allegedly poisoned. His son Mihail, was also imprisoned in 1959 for a year and half for "activities against the people and the state", while he claimed that he was imprisoned for demanding a truly autonomous Macedonia without communist control, but under an international protectorate. According to a later testimony of Mihail, this was the reason he and his father Georgi were imprisoned. Bulgarophilia was used as a rhetorical strategy by the communist regime against opponents. Furthermore, as Mihail pointed out, this was used against his dead uncle as well, of whom the communist leaders envied and wanted to devalue his legacy by denouncing him as Bulgarian. The other brother, Petar, was sentenced to imprisonment on the same charges, dying reportedly in 1951 in Idrizovo prison. According to other reports, after serving his sentence, he was released and died in 1962.

== Legacy ==
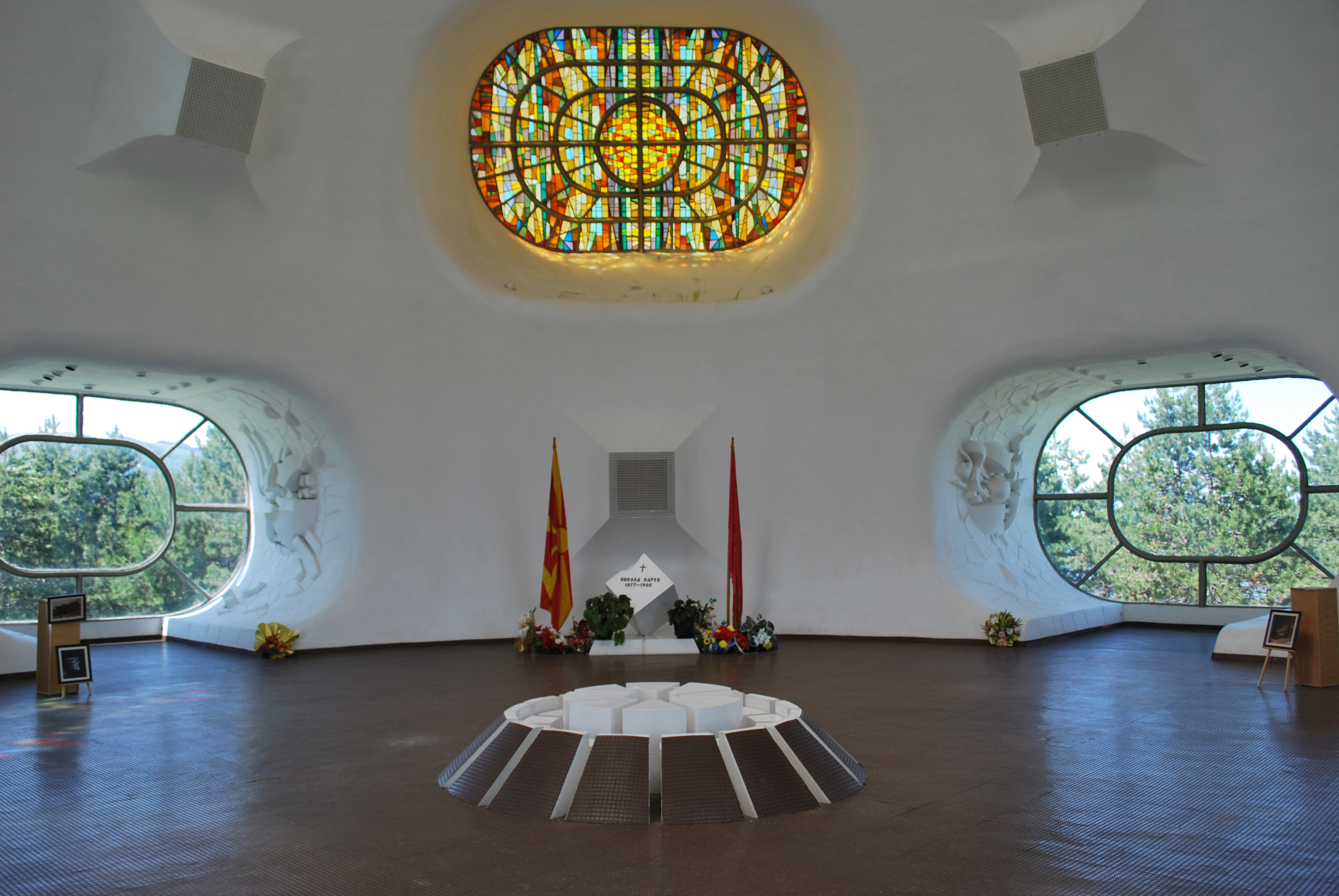
Karev's sarcophagus inside the Makedonium in Kruševo.

After World War II, the Kruševo Republic was promulgated as a historical predecessor of the new Socialist Republic of Macedonia by the Macedonian historiography. The focal point in the establishment of socialist continuity with the events of 1903 was Karev because of his socialist views. His name was part of the anthem of SR Macedonia: "Today over Macedonia." However, later it was removed without an official explanation. On August 2, 1948, a plaque was unveiled on his house, and a statue was erected in 1952. In 1953, on the 50th anniversary of the Ilinden Uprising, Karev's remains were transferred to his hometown Kruševo from the village of Rajčani where he was buried in 1905. However, there was no reinterment and his remains were placed in the storage of the town's historical museum. According to anthropologist Keith Brown, this decision may have been result of the suspicion of Bulgarian baggage in Karev's legacy by the communist leaders in this period, despite the efforts to commemorate him. Nevertheless, by the 1960s his name was firmly acclaimed. In 1969 the Yugoslav leader Josip Broz Tito paid tribute by laying a wreath on Karev's statue. In April 1990, his remains were ceremonially transferred to a sarcophagus placed in the Ilinden Uprising memorial, in the presence of Karev's family and representatives of the government.

In North Macedonia, he is regarded as an ethnic Macedonian. In 2008, a large bronze equestrian monument of Nikola Karev was placed in front of Parliament Building in Skopje, cast by the Ferdinando Marinelli Artistic Foundry of Florence, Italy.

== Gallery ==
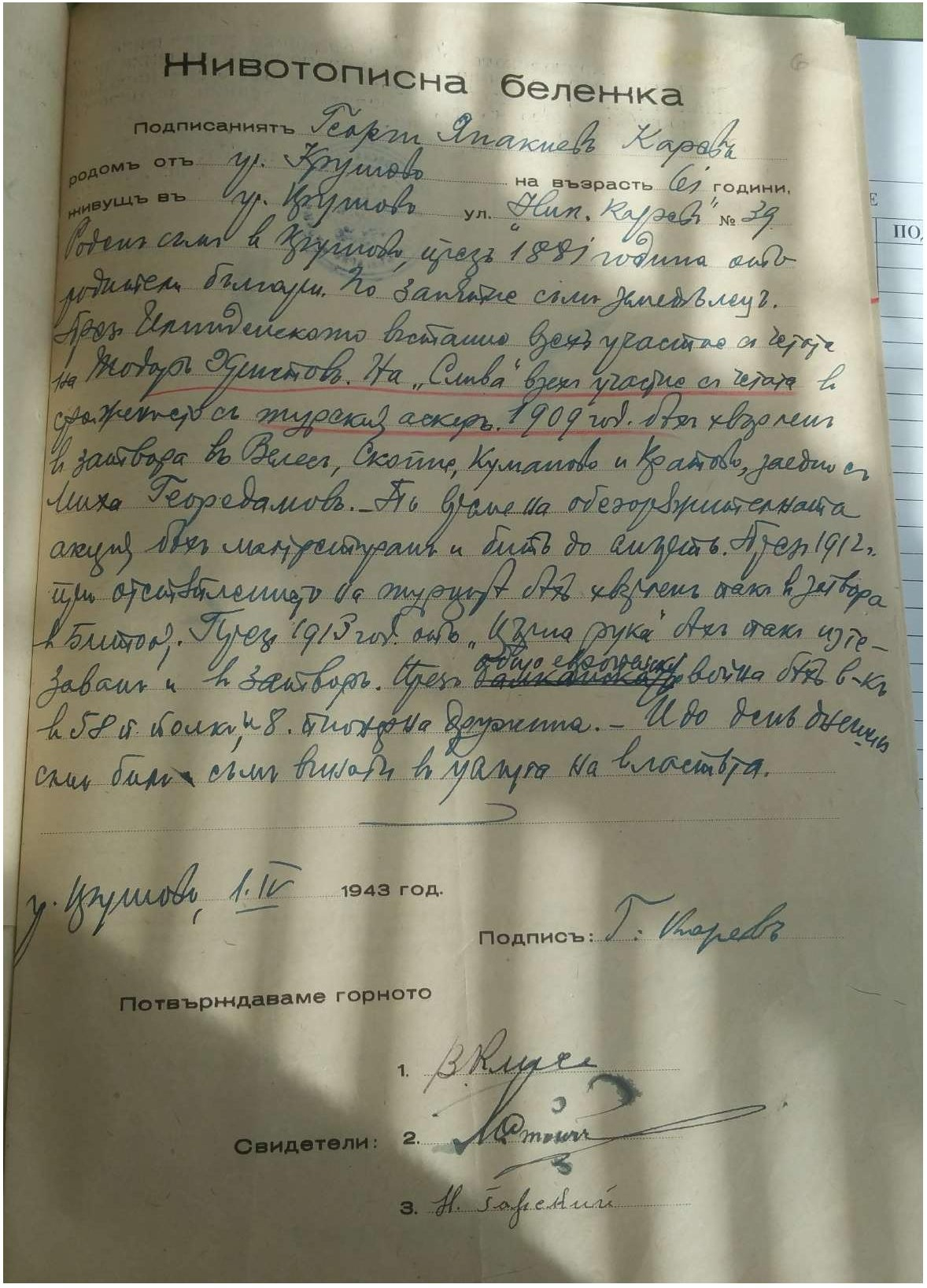
Autobiography of Nikola's brother Georgi Karev from 1943, where he claims hе was born in a Bulgarian family (in Bulgarian).

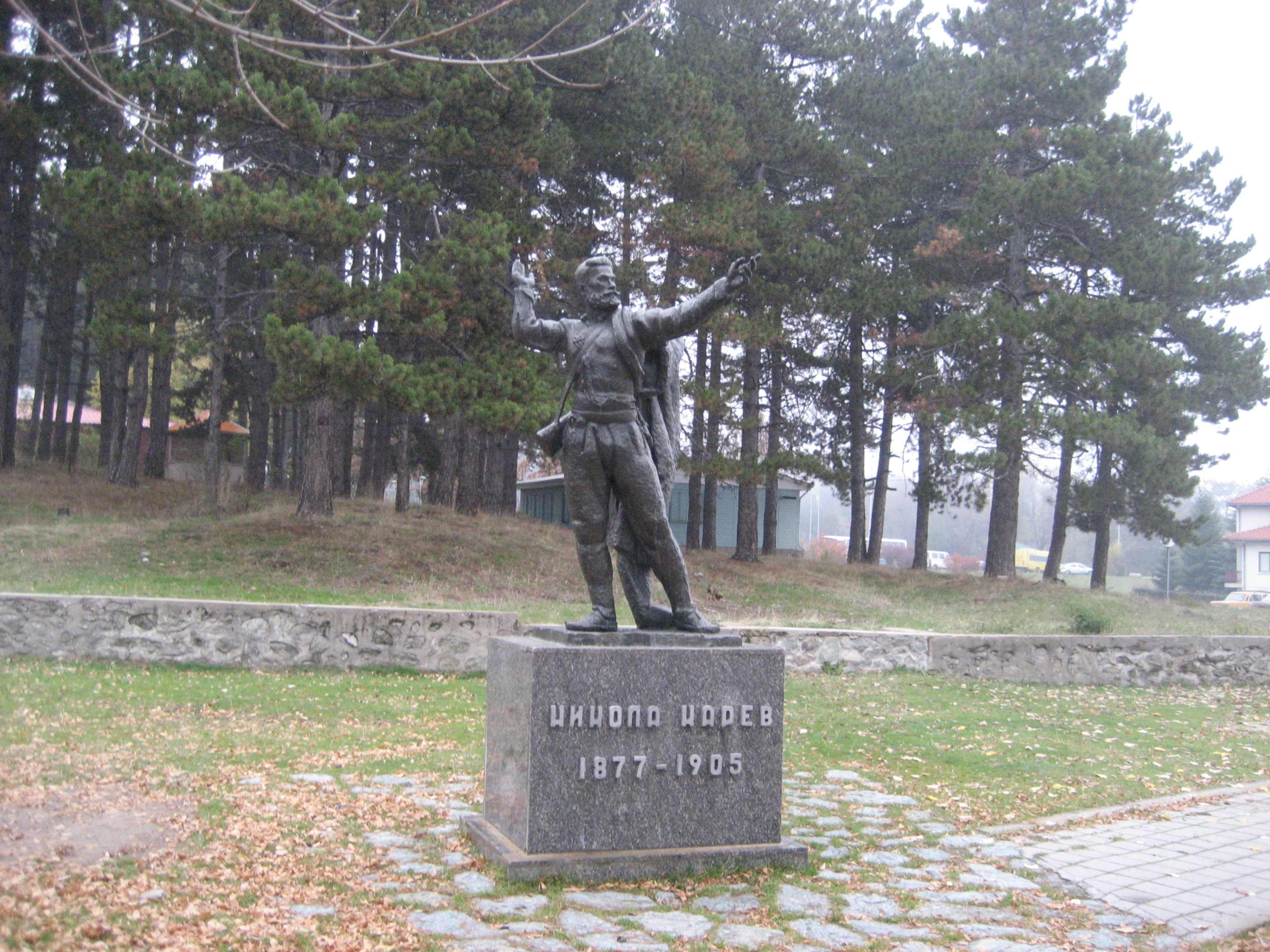
Monument of Karev near the Makedonium memorial complex, uncovered on the 50th year anniversary of the Ilinden uprising on August 2, 1953

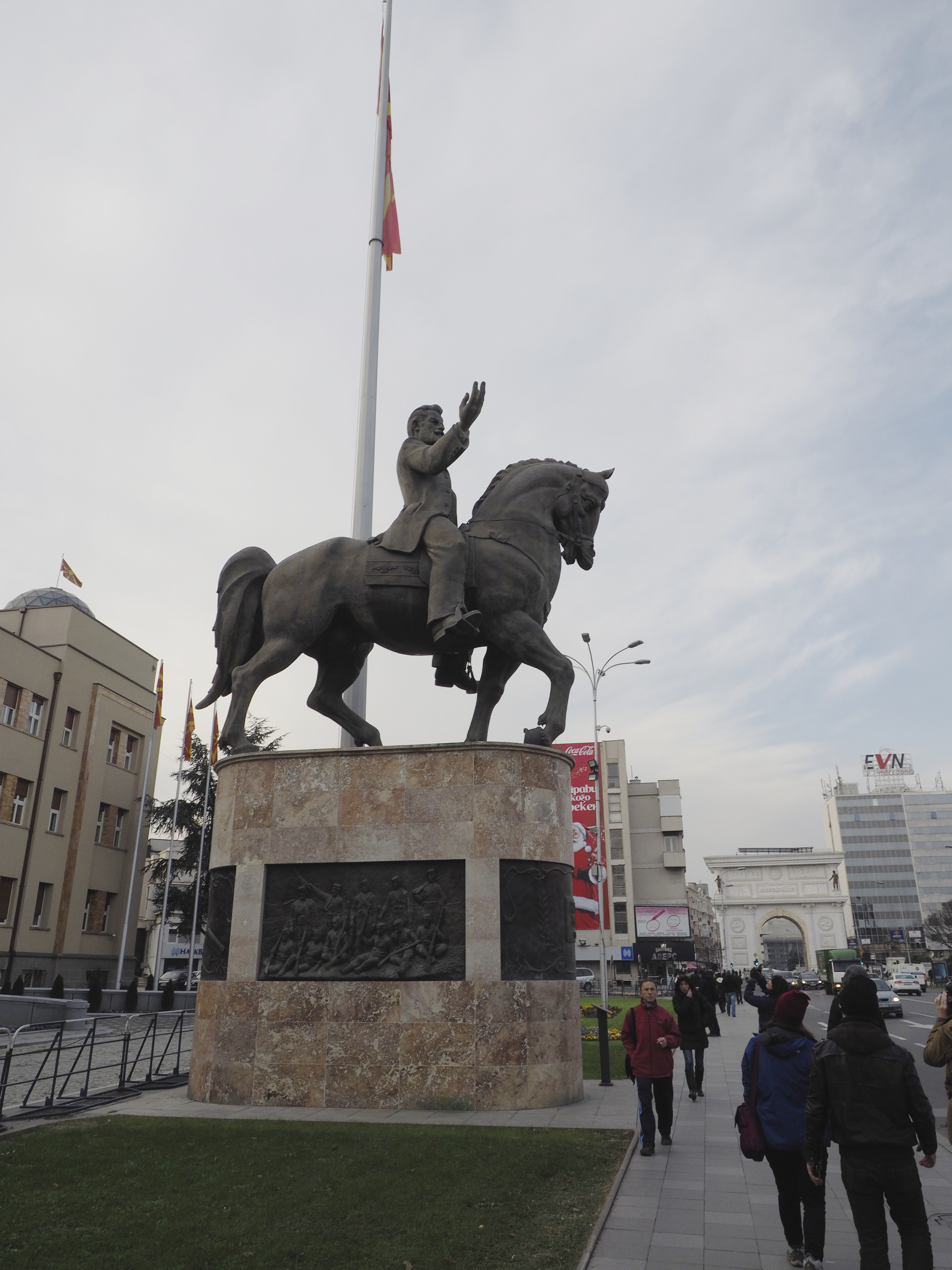
Monument of Nikola Karev in front of the Macedonian Parliament in Skopje.

== Bibliographies ==
- Пандев, К. "Устави и правилници на ВМОРО преди Илинденско-Преображенското въстание", Исторически преглед, 1969, кн. I, стр. 68–80. (in Bulgarian)
- Пандев, К. "Устави и правилници на ВМОРО преди Илинденско-Преображенското въстание", Извeстия на Института за история, т. 21, 1970, стр. 250–257. (in Bulgarian)
- Битоски, Крсте, сп. "Македонско Време", Скопје – март 1997, quoting: Quoting: Public Record Office – Foreign Office 78/4951 Turkey (Bulgaria), From Elliot, 1898, Устав на ТМОРО. S. 1. published in Документи за борбата на македонскиот народ за самостојност и за национална држава, Скопје, Универзитет "Кирил и Методиј": Факултет за филозофско-историски науки, 1981, pp 331 – 333. (in Macedonian)
- Hugh Pouton Who Are the Macedonians?, C. Hurst & Co, 2000. p. 53. ISBN 1-85065-534-0
- Fikret Adanir, Die Makedonische Frage: ihre entestehung und etwicklung bis 1908., Wiessbaden 1979, p. 112.
- Duncan Perry The Politics of Terror: The Macedonian Liberation Movements, 1893–1903 , Durham, Duke University Press, 1988. pp. 40–41, 210 n. 10.
- Keith Brown,The Past in Question: Modern Macedonia and the Uncertainties of Nation, Princeton University Press, 2003.
