= Kruševo Republic =

Rebel state in the Ottoman Empire (1903)

Kruševo Republic Крушевска Република Republica di Crushuva
- 1903
- Flag
- Motto: Svoboda ili smart (Bulgarian) "Freedom or Death"
- Status: Unrecognized rebel state
- Capital: Kruševo
- Government: Provisional
- President
  - 1903: Nikola Karev
- Chairman of the Provisional Government
  - 1903: Dinu Vangel
- Historical era: Ilinden–Preobrazhenie Uprising
  - Established: 3 August 1903
  - Disestablished: 13 August 1903
Preceded by	Succeeded by
Ottoman Empire	Ottoman Empire
- Today part of: North Macedonia

The Kruševo Republic (Bulgarian and Macedonian: Крушевска Република; Aromanian: Republica di Crushuva) was a short-lived political entity proclaimed in Kruševo during the Ilinden Uprising against the Ottoman Empire. It existed from 3 to 13 August 1903, when insurgents from the Internal Macedonian Revolutionary Organization seized the town and formed a provisional administration. Within North Macedonia, it is viewed as a historical predecessor to the present day state.

== History ==
=== Establishment ===
In the early 20th century, Kruševo was mainly inhabited by Slavic Macedonians, Aromanians and Orthodox Albanians. As a result of the rise of nationalism in the Ottoman Empire, the population was ethnoreligiously split between Bulgarian Exarchists and Greek Patriarchists. The latter constituted the largest ethnoreligious community. According to the ethnographer Vasil Kanchov's statistics based on linguistic affinity, at that time the town's inhabitants counted: 4,950 Bulgarians, 4,000 Vlachs (Aromanians) and 400 Orthodox Albanians. The Slavic-speaking Orthodox Christian inhabitants predominantly belonged to the Bulgarian Exarchate, serving as a key demographic base for the IMRO. On 3 August 1903, IMRO insurgents captured the town of Kruševo in the Manastir Vilayet of the Ottoman Empire (present-day North Macedonia). On 4 August, the Republic was proclaimed in a speech by Nikola Karev who was elected as president. Per Bulgarian and Macedonian historical narratives, an ephemeral "republic" governed by a provisional revolutionary administration was proclaimed in this town, which had a diverse Christian population.

=== Disestablishment ===
Initially surprised by the uprising, the Ottoman government took extraordinary military measures to suppress it. On 12 August, a force of 15,000 infantry, cavalry, and artillery under the command of Bahtiyar Paşa advanced from Prilep and, aided by bashi-bazouks, surrounded the town. Pitu Guli's band (cheta) tried to defend the town and entity from the Ottoman troops, after a fierce battle near Mečkin Kamen most of the band and their leader (voivode) perished. Another one called the Battle of Sliva took place at the same time, ending in defeat as well.

On 13 August, the Ottomans managed to disband the entity, committing atrocities against the town's inhabitants. As a result of the gunnery, the town was set partially ablaze. After the plundering of the town by the Turkish troops and the Albanian bashi-bazouks, the Ottoman authorities circulated a declaration for the inhabitants of Kruševo to sign, stating that the Bulgarian komitadjis had committed the atrocities and looted the town. A few citizens did sign it under administrative pressure.

== Politics ==
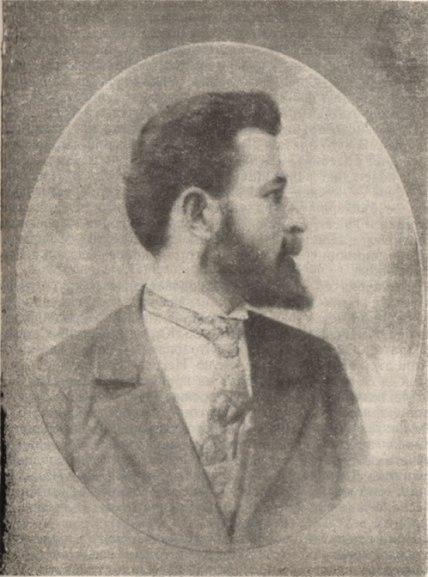
President of the Republic, Nikola Karev

=== Government ===
A Republican Council was elected with 60 members – 20 representatives from each of the three groups: Bulgarians, Greek identifying Slavic-speakers and Aromanian-speakers and Aromanians. The Council also elected an executive body – the Provisional Government – with six members (two from each mentioned group), whose duty was to promote law and order and manage supplies, finances, and medical care.

The presumable Kruševo Manifesto was published in the first days after the proclamation. Written by Nikola Kirov, it outlined the goals of the uprising, calling upon the Muslim population and the Christians alike to join forces with the provisional government in the struggle against Ottoman tyranny, to attain freedom and independence for Macedonia. Both, Nikola Kirov and Nikola Karev were members of the Bulgarian Workers' Social Democratic Party, from where they derived these leftist ideas.

=== Intercommunal relations ===
Karev allegedly called all the members of the local Council brother Bulgarians. IMRO insurgents flew Bulgarian flags, killed five Greek Patriarchists accused of being Ottoman spies, and subsequently assaulted the local Turk and Albanian Muslims. Greek sources witness that the insurgents were aggressive or provocative towards the Patriarchist population. Karev attempted to reduce attacks against the Muslim population and prevent the plundering from insurgents and their supporters. He also attended a Greek church service in a gesture of tolerance and unity. However, except for Exarchist Aromanians, as Guli's family, who were Bulgarophiles, most members of the other ethnoreligious communities dismissed the IMRO as pro-Bulgarian.

== Legacy ==
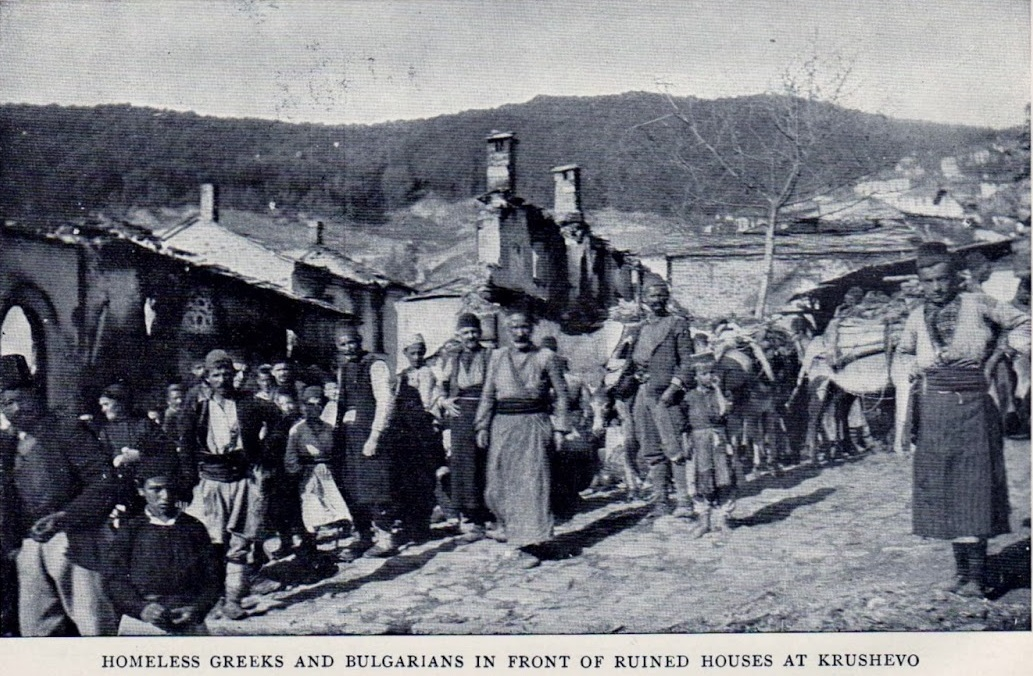
Homeless inhabitants of Kruševo in front of the ruins of the town. Regarding the escape of the Bulgarian quarter (Slavic area) from destruction, a bribery was suspected, or the fear of an explosion of the ammunition stored there.

=== Commemoration ===
The celebration of the events in Kruševo began during the First World War, when the area, then called Southern Serbia, was occupied by Bulgaria. Naum Tomalevski, who was appointed a mayor of Kruševo, organized the nationwide celebration of the 15th anniversary of the Ilinden uprising. At the site of the Battle of Mečkin Kamen, a monument and a memorial-fountain were built. After the war, they were destroyed by the Serbian authorities, which continued implementing a policy of forcible Serbianization. The tradition of celebrating these events was restored during World War II in the region, when it was occupied by Bulgaria again. The Bulgarian authorities and the local public officially commemorated then the Krusevo Republic as part of the common Bulgarian revolutionary past.

During World War II, the pro-Yugoslav communist Macedonian Partisans developed the idea of historical continuity between their struggle and that of the insurgents of the Ilinden Uprising and Kruševo Republic. Macedonian partisan leaders and detachments chose names of heroes from IMRO, one such was Kuzman Josifovski Pitu, named after Pitu Guli. The Kruševo Republic was referred to in the lyrics of the partisan song "Today over Macedonia", later to become the Macedonian anthem.

The "Ilinden Uprising Museum" was founded in 1953 in SFR Yugoslavia, on the 50th anniversary of the Kruševo Republic in the former house of the Tomalevski family where the Republic was proclaimed. In 1974 an enormous monument, known as Makedonium, was built on the hill above Kruševo, which marked the feat of the revolutionaries and the ASNOM. In the area, there is another monument called Mečkin Kamen commemorating the battle that took place there.

=== Socialist Yugoslav interpretation ===
After the Second World War, the idea of socialist continuity proceeded in the newly established Socialist Republic of Macedonia, where the Kruševo Republic was considered as its antecedent. Furthermore, Macedonian historians often compared it to the Paris Commune, the classic symbol of revolutionary socialism. It was emphasized how the Council and commissionerships were evenly split between the nationalities, in a style bound to serve as an example to the Balkans in a similar manner how the Paris Commune served for the world. Another instance firmly praised was the last stand of Pitu Guli and his man in the Battle of Meckin Kamen, which achieved an iconic status in the Macedonian national history.

During the Informbiro period, the name of insurgents' leader Nikola Karev was scrapped from the Macedonian national anthem. He and his brothers were suspected of being Bulgarophiles. Nikola Kirov's writings, which are among the most known primary sources on the rebellion, mention Bulgarians, Vlachs (Aromanians), and Greeks (sic: Grecomans), who participated in the events in Kruševo. Although post-World War II Macedonian historians objected to Kirov's classification of Kruševo's Slavic population as Bulgarian, they quickly adopted everything else in his narrative of the events in 1903 as definitive. As a result of the Greek and Bulgarian challenges against the Macedonian identity, Macedonian historians enforced their efforts to claim that IMRO activists had been exclusively Macedonian in identity.

=== Contemporary legacy ===
The legacy of the entity is disputed between Bulgaria and North Macedonia. North Macedonia sees the entity as a prelude to its statehood and perceives it as the first republic in the Balkans. Some authors maintain it was an independent socialist republic, the first in the Balkans. The entity is now a symbol of Macedonian statehood. The Macedonian historian Blaže Ristovski has regret the fact that the town administration formed in liberated Kruševo was composed of people who identified themselves as "Bulgarians", Vlachs (Aromanians) and "Greeks" (Grecomans), and that the label "Macedonians" does not appear in the surviving written records.

== Gallery ==
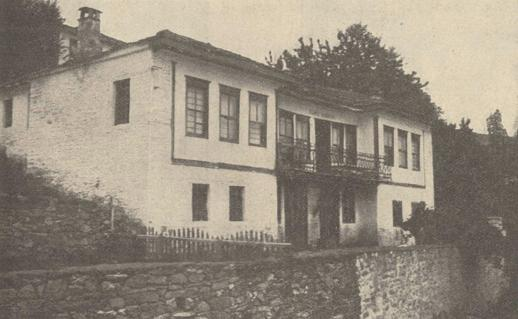
The Tomalevski family house where the Republic was proclaimed. The family later emigrated to Bulgaria. In modern day the "Museum of History Kruševo" is located in the house.

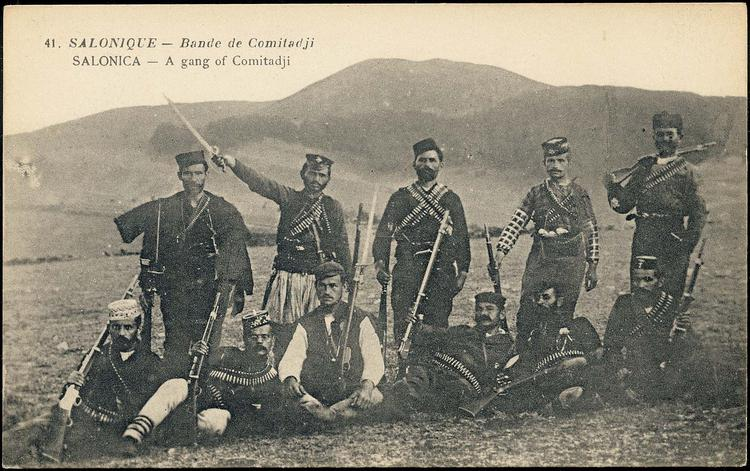
The Kruševo headquarters in August 1903.

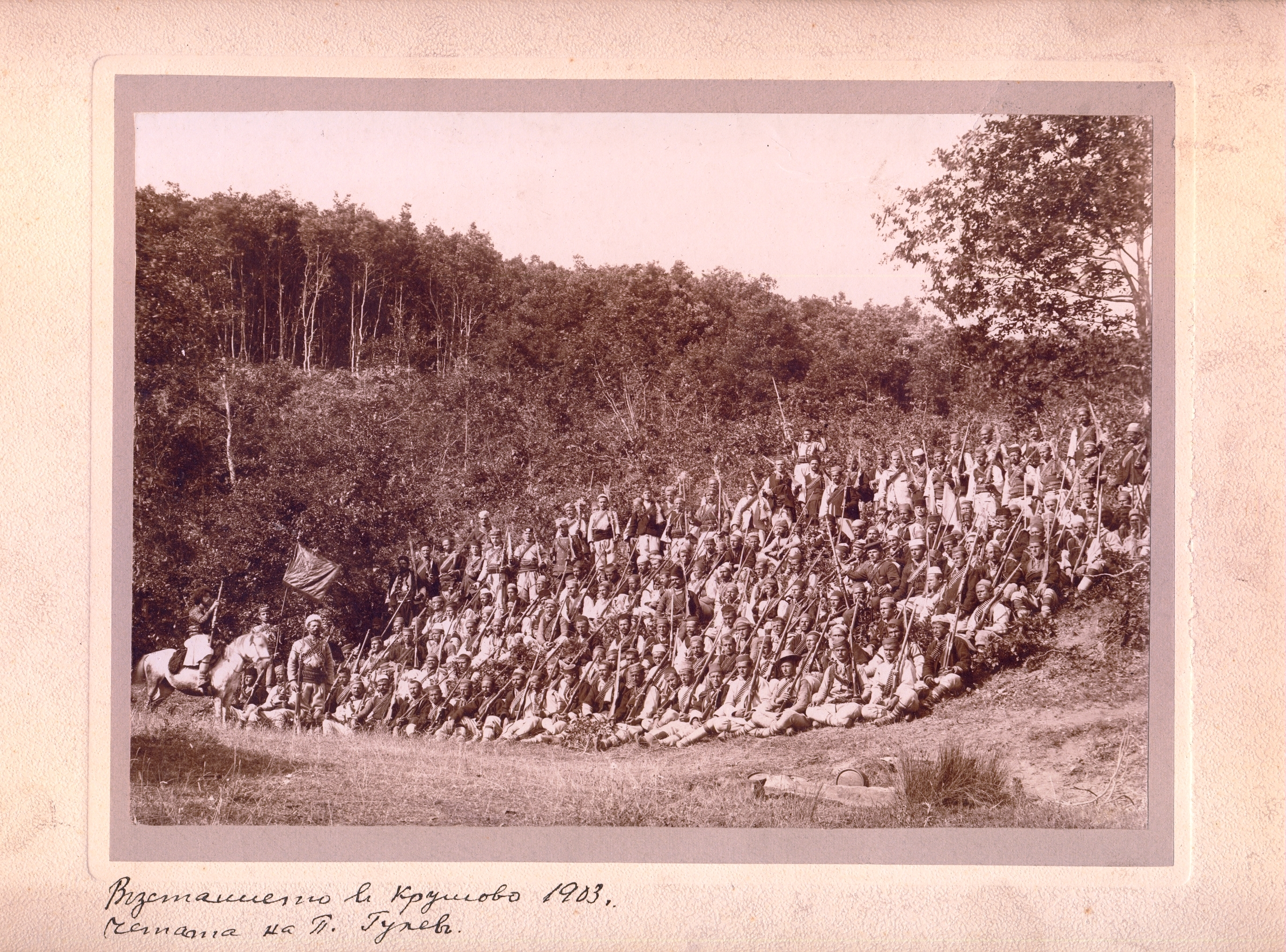
The cheta of Pitu Guli near the village of Birino, close to Kruševo, 1903

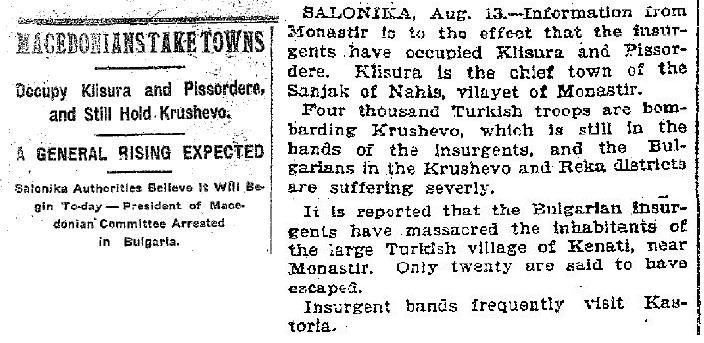
The events in Kruševo as seen by the American New York Times; 14 August 1903.

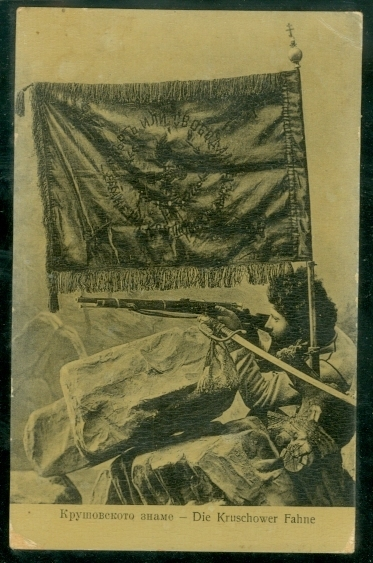
Bulgarian postcard representing an insurgent with the flag of Kruševo cheta

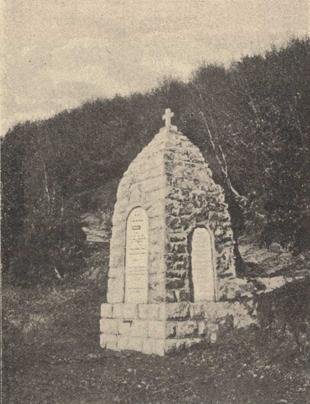
The monument of the Battle of Mečkin Kamen built by the Bulgarian authorities during the First World War.

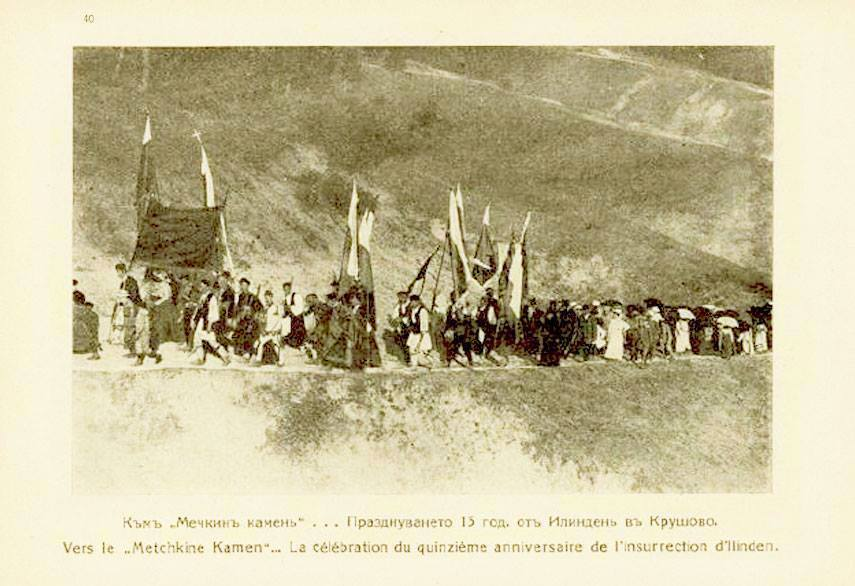
Celebration of the 15th anniversary of the events in Krushevo in 1918 during the Bulgarian occupation of then Southern Serbia.

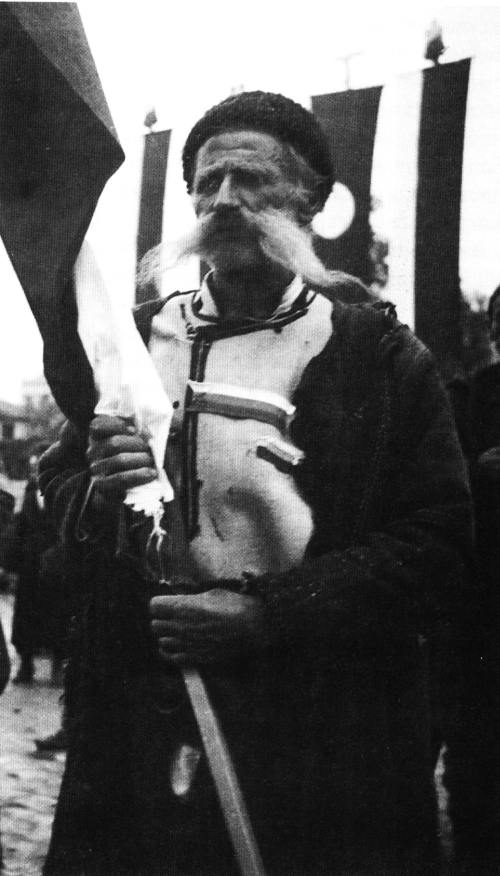
Old comitadji, celebrating Ilinden Uprising in Kruševo in 1943, during the Bulgarian annexation.

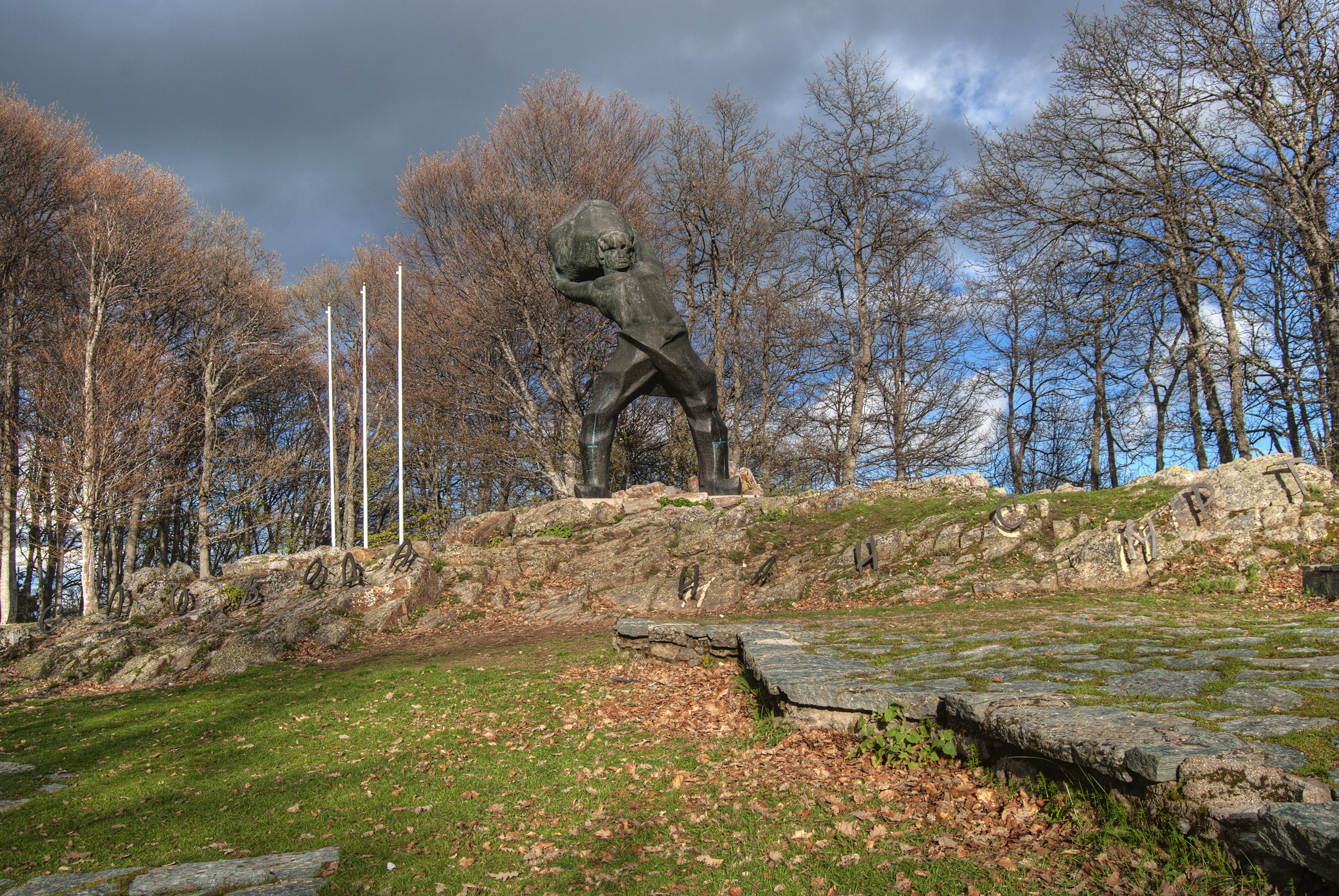
Monument dedicated to the Mečkin Kamen battle at the location on which Pitu Guli and his men made their last stand

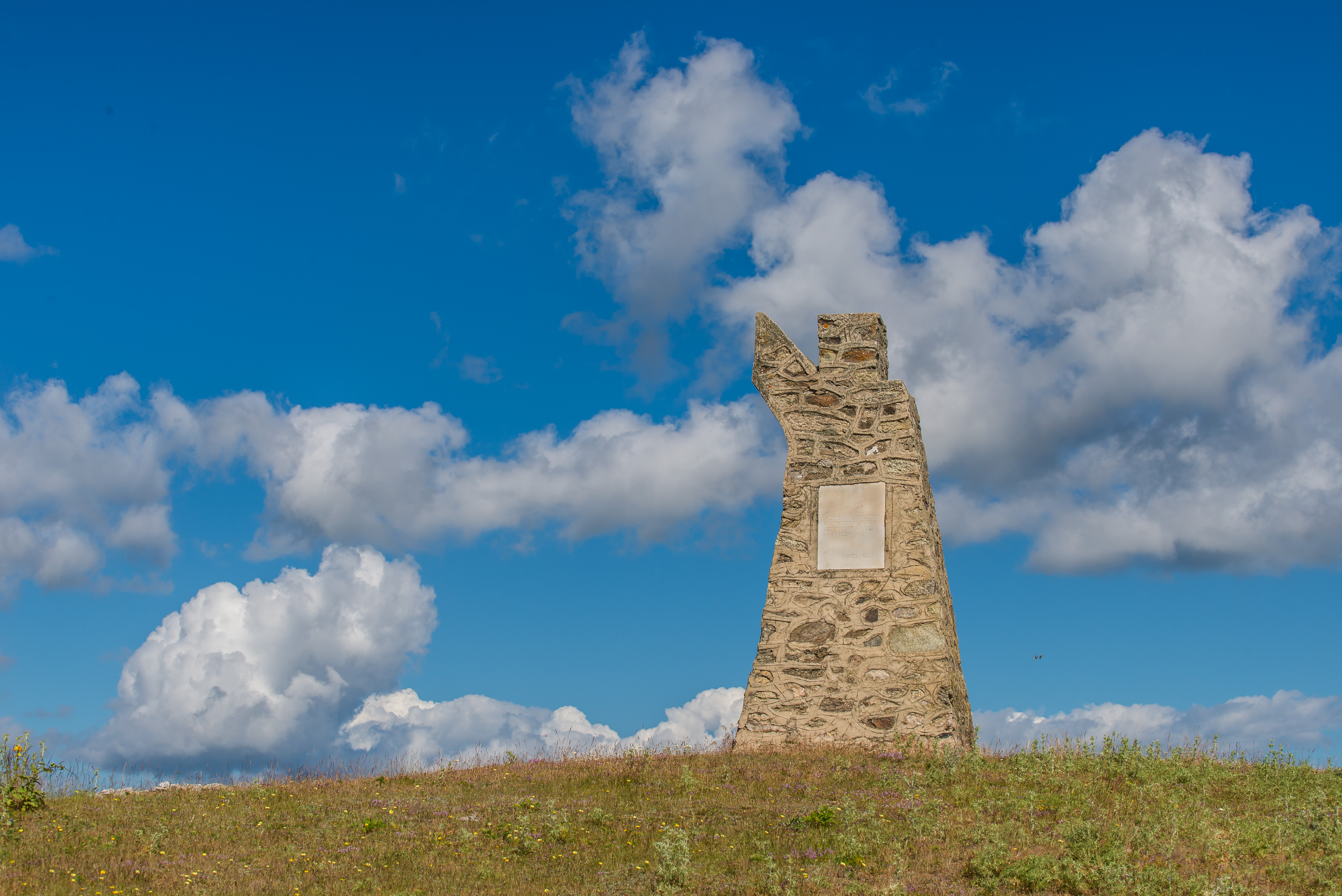
The monument of the Battle of Sliva, near Kruševo.

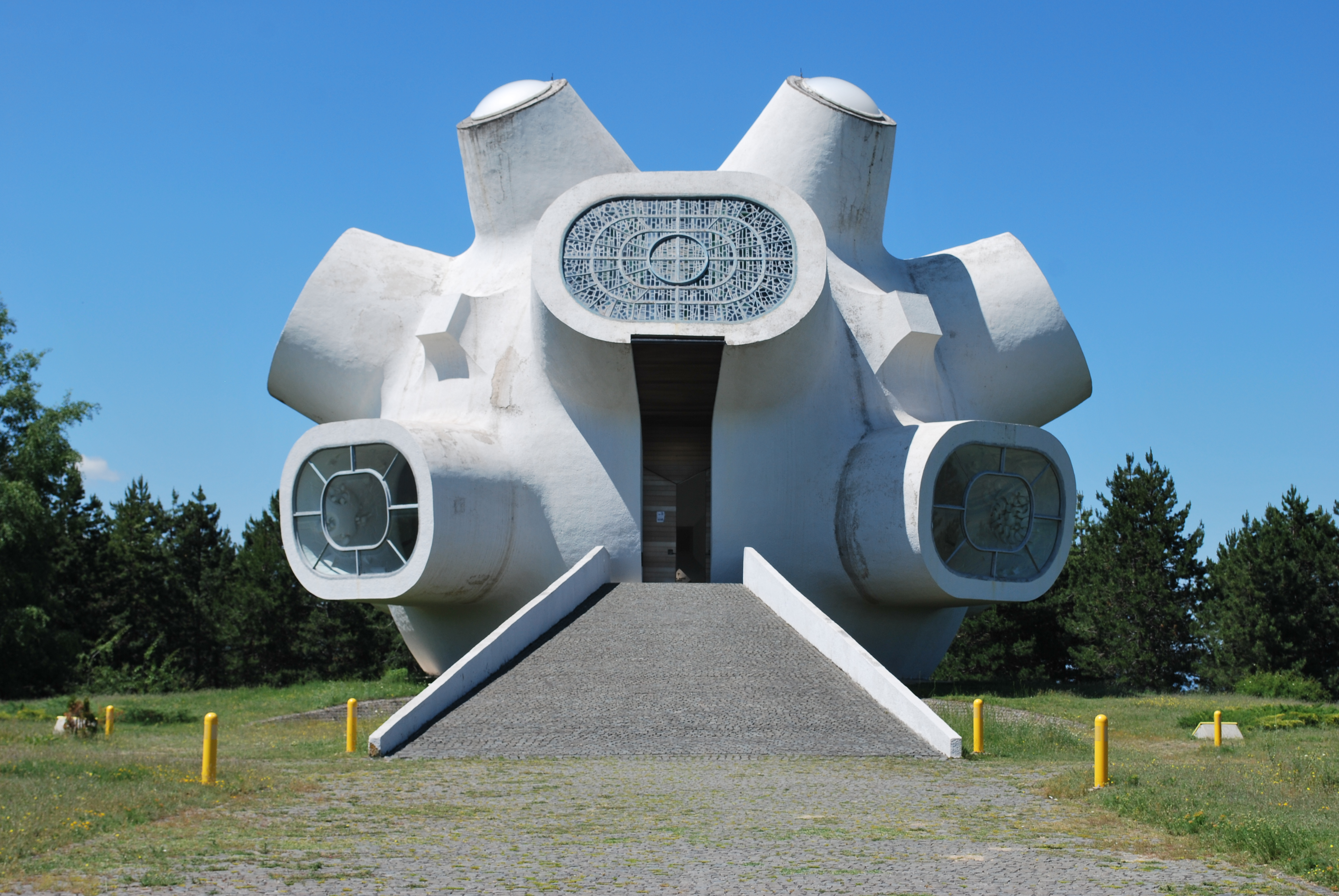
Ilinden memorial complex, opened on the 71st anniversary of the uprising in 1974.

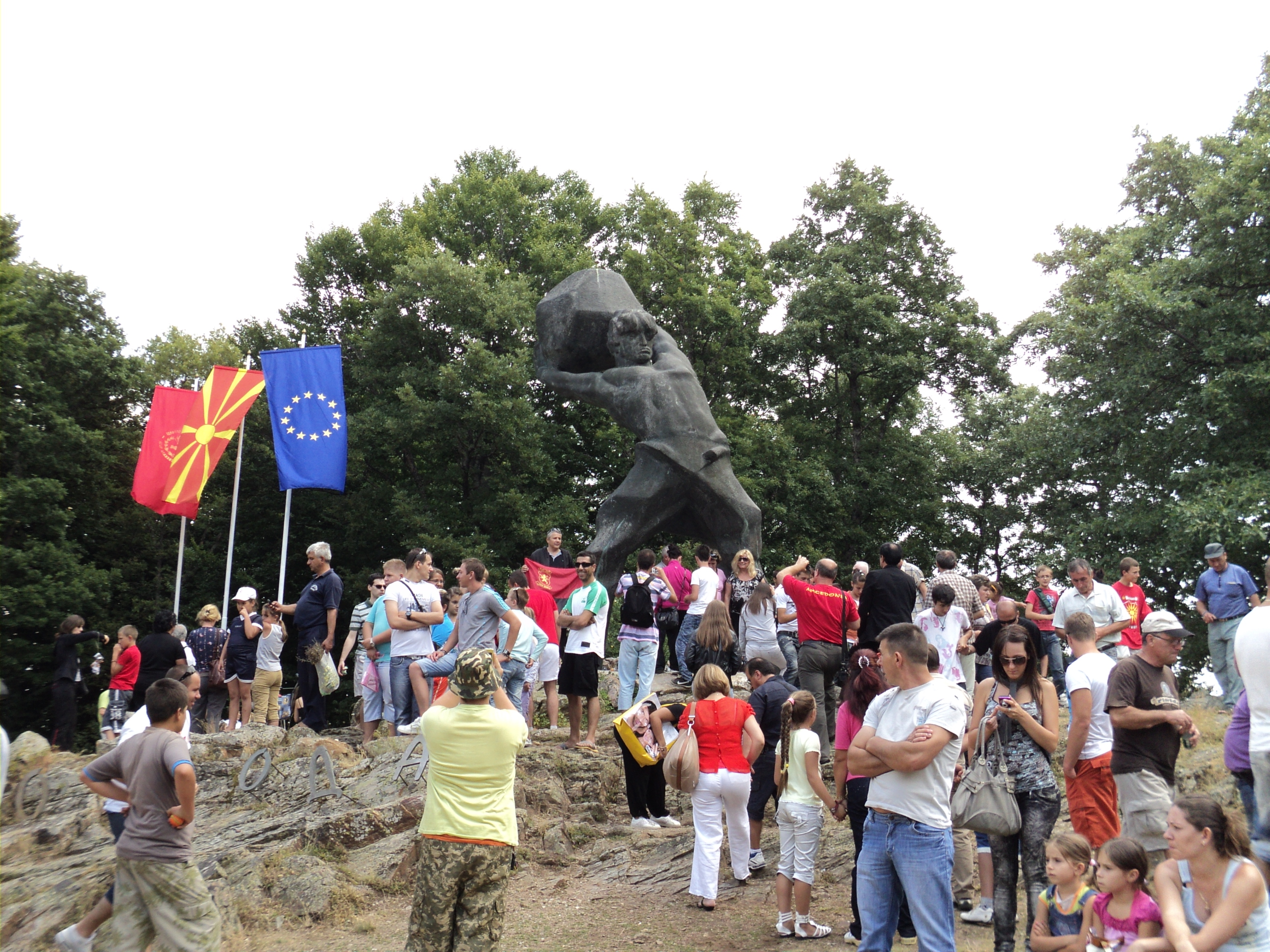
Celebration of Ilinden on 2 August 2011 on Mečkin Kamen, Republic of Macedonia.

== See also ==
- Strandzha Commune
