= Greeks in North Macedonia =

Total population
- 294

Languages
- Greek, Macedonian; Aromanian (historical, by Hellenized Aromanians)

Religion
- Eastern Orthodox Church

Related ethnic groups
- Ethnic Greeks

Greeks in North Macedonia form a small community numbering 294 individuals per 2021 census.

== Modern history ==
=== Late Ottoman era ===
There is a historical controversy that stems from the rise of nationalism in the Ottoman Empire during late 19th and early 20th century Ottoman era statistical treatment of Aromanian-speaking and Slavic-speaking population groups in the area, which partially used to identify themselves as Greeks as part of the Rum millet. A number of the Hellenic Macedonian Committee's chieftains and fighters during the Macedonian Struggle originated from North Macedonia.

A large number of Aromanian and Slavic-speakers with Greek identity left the region after the Balkan Wars (1912–1913) and First World War (1914–1918) and settled in Greek Macedonia.

=== Refugees from the Greek Civil War ===
A number of Greek communists fled from Greece to Yugoslav Macedonia as political refugees, due to the defeat of the Democratic Army of Greece at the Greek Civil War. Today in North Macedonia live mostly their descendants.

=== 21st century ===
Greeks are mainly settled now in the cities of Gevgelija (Greek: Γευγελή, Gevgelī́) and Bitola (Greek: Μοναστήρι, Monastī́ri). Today this community is a remnant from the times of Communist Yugoslavia. Ethnologue cites Greek as an "immigrant language" in North Macedonia. In 2002, 422 individuals declared themselves as Greeks in the census. The 2021 census recorded 294 individuals declaring their ethnicity as Greek.

== Notable historical personalities ==
The following Aromanian and Slavic speakers were born during Ottoman times in what is today North Macedonia and identified as Greek after the rise of nationalism in the Ottoman Empire:

- Theodoros Adam, chieftain of the Macedonian Struggle
- Charalambos Boufidis, chieftain of the Macedonian Struggle
- Petros Christou (1887-1908), chieftain of the Macedonian Struggle
- Georgios Karaiskakis (-1910), chieftain of the Macedonian Struggle
- Evangelos Koukoudeas, chieftain of the Macedonian Struggle
- Eleni Karinte, first love of Mustafa Kemal Atatürk
- Dimitrios Lalas (1844/48-1911), composer and musician
- Georgios Modis (1887-1975), jurist, politician, writer and participant in the Macedonian Struggle
- Theodoros Modis, merchant, scholar and participant in the Macedonian Struggle
- Traianos Nallis (1874-?), politician
- Pantelis Papaioannou (c.1880-1907), chieftain of the Macedonian Struggle
- Theofylaktos Papakonstantinou (1905-1991), writer and politician
- Anastasios Pichion (1836-1913), educator and participant the Macedonian Struggle
- Michail Sapkas (1873-1956), politician and doctor
- Dimitrios Semsis (1883-1950), violinist
- Michael Sionidis (1870-1935), chieftain of the Macedonian Struggle
- Alexandros Svolos (1892-1956), President of Political Committee of National Liberation during WW2
- Dimitrios Tsapanos (1882/1883-?), chieftain of the Macedonian Struggle
- Dimitrios Tsitsimis, chieftain of the Macedonian Struggle
- Georgios Vafopoulos (1903-1996), poet, writer, teacher and journalist
- Antonios Zois (1869-1941), chieftain of the Macedonian Struggle

== See also ==
- Greece–North Macedonia relations
- Macedonians (Greeks)
- Slavic speakers of Greek Macedonia
- George Zorbas
- Aromanians in North Macedonia
- Pelagonia
