= Bulgarian millet =

Ethno-religious and linguistic community within the Ottoman Empire

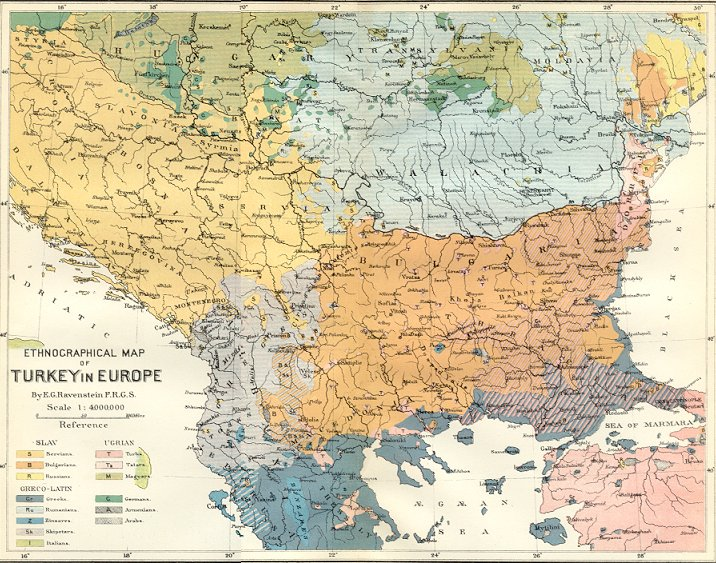
Ethnic map of the Balkans from 1880 by E.G. Ravenstein. Bulgarians are marked with orange.

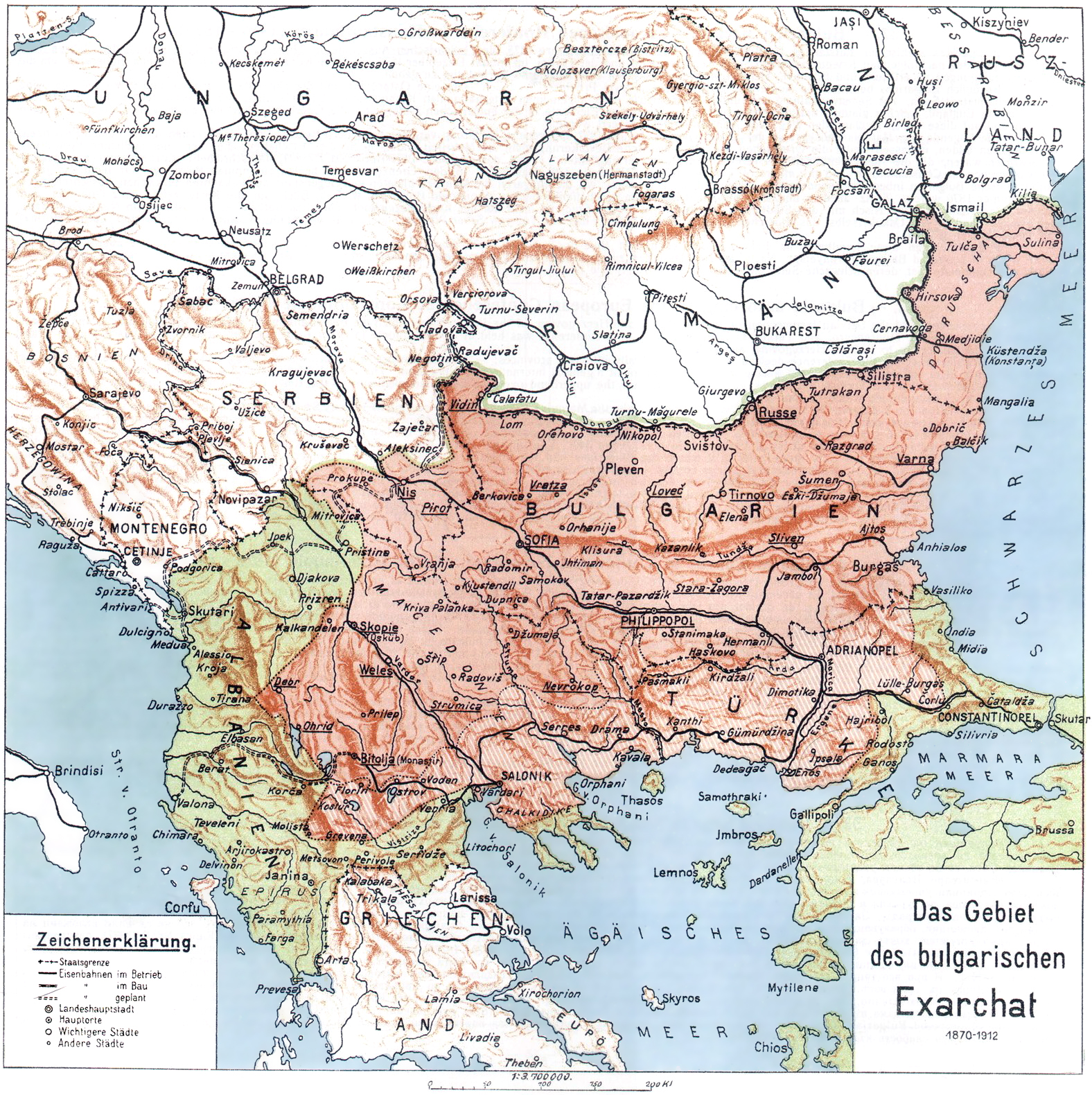
Territories under the jurisdiction of the Bulgarian Exarchate (1870–1913).

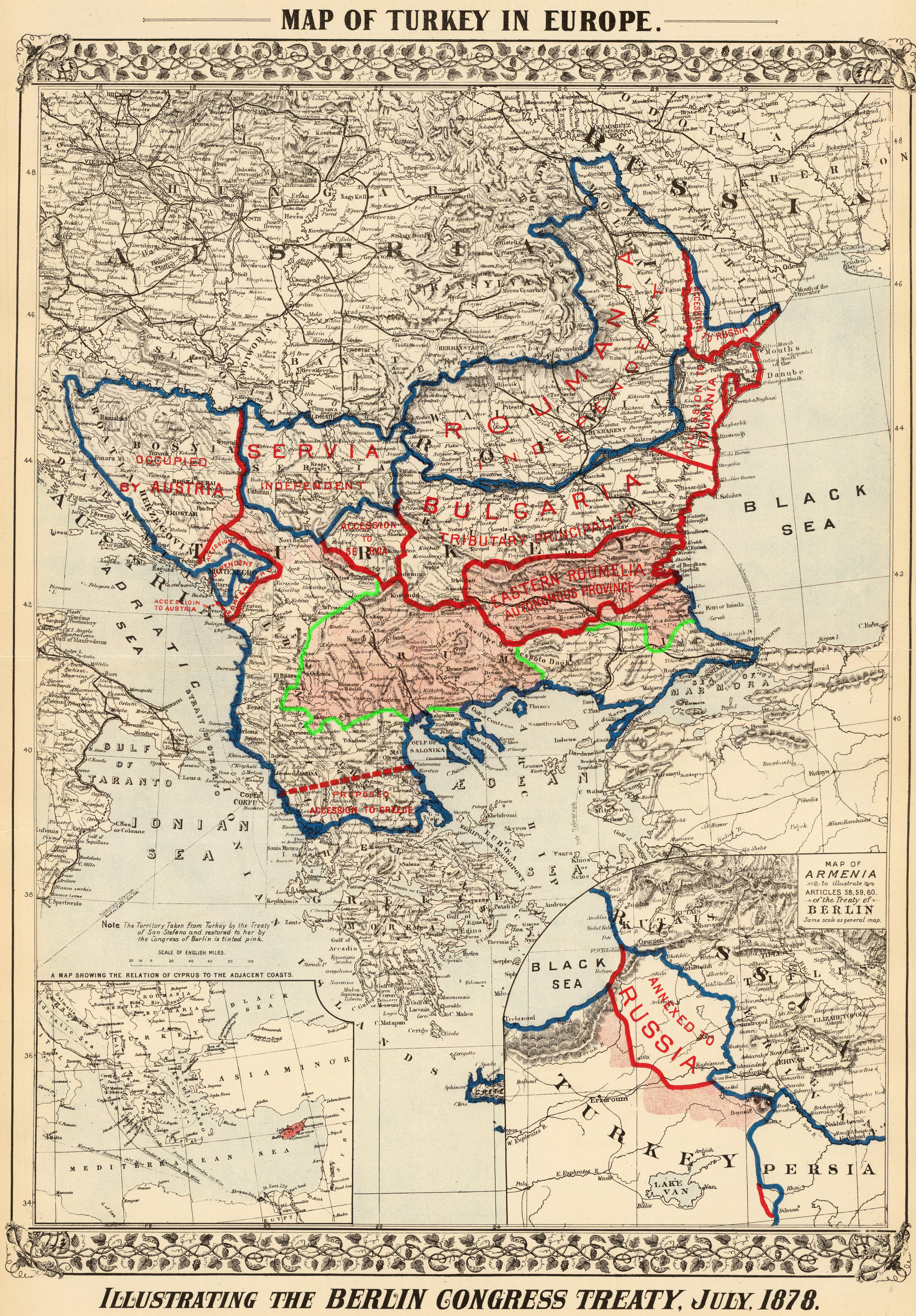
Map of European Turkey after the Treaty of Berlin. Macedonia and Adrianople areas, which were given back from Bulgaria to the Ottomans are shown with green frontiers.

Bulgarian millet (Turkish: Bulgar Milleti) was an ethno-religious and linguistic community within the Ottoman Empire from the mid-19th to early 20th century.

The semi-official term, was used by the Sultan for the first time in 1847, and was his tacit consent to a more ethno-linguistic definition of the Bulgarians as a nation. This resulted in the rise of a Bulgarian St. Stephen Church in the Ottoman capital Constantinople in 1851. Officially as a separate millet in 1860 were recognized the Bulgarian Uniates, and then in 1870 the Bulgarian Orthodox Christians (Eksarhhâne-i millet i Bulgar). At that time the classical Ottoman millet-system began to degrade with the continuous identification of the religious creed with ethnic identity and the term millet was used as a synonym of nation.

The establishment of the Bulgarian Exarchate in 1870, meant in practice official recognition of a separate Bulgarian nationality, and in this case the religious affiliation became a consequence of national allegiance. The founding of an independent church, along with the revival of Bulgarian language and education, were the crucial factors that strengthened the national consciousness and revolutionary struggle, that led to the creation of a Bulgarian nation-state in 1878.

The ideas of Bulgarian nationalism grew up in significance, following the Congress of Berlin which took back the regions of Macedonia and Thrace under Ottoman control. So the Bulgarian nationalist movement proclaimed as its aim the inclusion of most of Macedonia and Thrace under Greater Bulgaria. At the eve of the 20th century a series of conflicts arose into Ottoman regions outside the Bulgarian principality between Greeks and Serbs from one side and Bulgarians from another. The local Slavic villagers were forced to declare themselves for either of the sides, thus became divided into Bulgarophiles, Grecomans and Serbomans. After the Balkan Wars the Bulgarian millet was limited finally to the boundaries of the Bulgarian state, despite the nominally much larger previous territory of the Bulgarian Exarchate.

== History ==
=== Background ===
All Orthodox Christians, including Bulgarians, in the Ottoman Empire were subordinated to the Patriarchate of Constantinople, which was dominated by Greek Phanariotes by the end of the 19th century. The Orthodox Christians were included into the Rum millet. Belonging to this Orthodox community grew more important to the common people than their ethnic origins and the Balkan Orthodox people identified themselves simply as Christians. Nevertheless, ethnonymes never disappeared and some form of ethnic identification was preserved as evident from a Sultan's Firman from 1680, which lists the ethnic groups in the Balkan lands as follows: Greeks (Rum), Albanians (Arnaut), Serbs (Sirf), Vlachs (Eflak or Ullah) and Bulgarians (Bulgar).

During the late 18th century, the Enlightenment in Western Europe provided influence for the initiation of the National awakening of the Bulgarian people. The awakening process met opposition with the rise of nationalism under the Ottoman Empire in the early 19th century. According to the proponents of Bulgarian national awakening, Bulgarians were oppressed as an ethnic community not only by the Turks, but also by the Greeks. They considered the Greek Patriarchal clergy to be the main oppressor. forced Bulgarians to educate their children in Greek schools and imposed Church services exclusively in Greek in order to Hellenize the Bulgarian population.

=== School and Church struggle ===
During the early nineteenth century, national elites used ethno-linguistic principles to differentiate between "Bulgarian" and "Greek" identity into the Rum millet. Bulgarians wanted to create their own schools in a common modern literary standard. In the Balkans, Bulgarian education stimulated nationalist sentiments in the middle of the 19th century. Most wealthy Bulgarian merchants sent their children for a secular education, turning some of them into Bulgarian national activists. At that time secular Bulgarian schools were spreading throughout Moesia, Thrace and Macedonia, aided by modern classroom methods. This expanding set of Bulgarian schools began to come into contact with Greek schools setting the stage for nationalist conflict.

By the middle of the century, Bulgarian activists shifted their attention from language to religion and started debate on the establishment of a separate Bulgarian church. As a consequence, until the 1870s, the focus of the Bulgarian National Revival switched to the struggle for a Bulgarian Church, independent from the Patriarchate of Constantinople. Cultural, administrative and even political independence from the Patriarchate could only be obtained through the establishment of a separate millet or nation. The coordinated actions aimed at the recognition of a separate millet constitute the so-called "Church Struggle". The actions were carried out by Bulgarian national leaders and supported by the majority of the Slavic population in modern-day Bulgaria, Eastern Serbia, North Macedonia and Northern Greece.

Bulgarians often relied on the Ottoman authorities as allies in their confrontations with the Patriarchists. The Sultan Firman of 1847 was the first official document was issued, in which the name Bulgarian millet was mentioned. In 1849 the Sultan granted the Bulgarian millet the right to construct its own church in Istanbul, The church subsequently hosted the Easter Sunday of 1860 when the autocephalous Bulgarian Exarchate was first de facto proclaimed.

=== Recognition of the Bulgarian millet and Bulgarian schism ===
In the meantime, some Bulgarian leaders tried to negotiate the establishment of a Bulgarian Uniate Church. The movement for union with Rome led to the initial recognition of a separate Bulgarian Catholic millet by the Sultan in 1860. The Sultan issued a special decree (irade) for that occasion. Although the movement initially gathered some 60,000 adherents, the subsequent establishment of the Bulgarian Exarchate reduced their number with some 75%.

The Bulgarian "Church Struggle" was resolved finally with a Sultan decree in 1870, which established the Bulgarian Exarchate. The act also instituted the Bulgarian Orthodox millet – an entity combining the modern notion for a nation with the Ottoman principle of millet. It also turned the Bulgarian Exarch into both a religious leader and an administrative head of the millet. The new entity enjoyed internal cultural and administrative autonomy. However, it excluded non-Orthodox Bulgarians and, thus, failed to embrace all representatives of the Bulgarian ethnos. Scholars argue that the millet system was instrumental to transforming the Bulgarian Exarchate into an entity that promoted ethnoreligious nationalism amongst Orthodox Bulgarians.

On 11 May 1872 in the Bulgarian St. Stephen Church in Constantinople, which had been closed by the Ecumenical Patriarch's order, the Bulgarian hierarchs, celebrated a liturgy, whereafter the autocephaly of the Bulgarian Church was declared. The decision on the unilateral declaration of autocephaly by the Bulgarian Church was not accepted by the Patriarchate of Constantinople. In this way, the term phyletism was coined at the Holy pan-Orthodox Synod that met in Istanbul on 10 August. The Synod issued an official condemnation of ecclesiastical nationalism, and declared on 18 September the Bulgarian Exarchate schismatic.

=== Independence of Bulgaria ===
Having achieved religious independence, Bulgarian nationalists focused on gaining political independence as well. Two revolutionary movements started to develop in the beginning of the 1870s: the Internal Revolutionary Organization and the Bulgarian Revolutionary Central Committee. Their armed struggle reached its peak with the April Uprising which broke out in 1876. It resulted in the Russo-Turkish War of 1877–1878, and led to the foundation of the third Bulgarian state after the Treaty of San Stefano. The treaty set up a Principality Bulgaria which territory included the wide area between the Danube and the Balkan Mountains, most of today Eastern Serbia, Northern Thrace, parts of Eastern Thrace and nearly all of Macedonia. At that time the clergy's shifts from the Orthodox to the Catholic Church and vice versa were symptomatic of the foreign powers' game that the clergy got involved after the 1878 Berlin Treaty, that partitioned the stipulated territory of the new Principality. Thus, in the interplay between the Orthodox and the Uniat doctrine, Bulgaria supported the Orthodox Exarchate. Russia supported Bulgaria. The Greek Patriarchate of Constantinople supported the Greek national idea. France and the Habsburg Empire supported the Uniats. The Ottoman Empire's attitude was depending on how it had to balance its own interests in the game with the Great Powers.

=== Thrace and Macedonia ===
The ideas of Bulgarian nationalism grew up in significance, following the Congress of Berlin which took back the regions of Macedonia and Southern Thrace, returning them under the control of the Ottoman Empire. Also an autonomous Ottoman province, called Eastern Rumelia was created in Northern Thrace. As a consequence, the Bulgarian nationalist movement proclaimed as its aim the inclusion of most of Macedonia and Thrace under Greater Bulgaria. Eastern Rumelia was annexed to Bulgaria in 1885 through bloodless revolution.

With the establishment of the Exarchate and Bulgarian millet, the Christian population of Macedonia became an object of contest between Bulgarian, Greek and Serbian nationalist propaganda conducted through the churches and schools, in an attempt to tie them to their cause, thus validate the territorial claims. Alignment with the Bulgarian millet was treated as national expression, a way of thinking that was foreign to most peasants, for whom it was only a choice of Church or rather millet. During the early 1890s, two pro-Bulgarian revolutionary organizations active in Macedonia and Southern Thrace were founded: the Bulgarian Macedonian-Adrianople Revolutionary Committees and the Supreme Macedonian-Adrianople Committee. The Macedonian Slavs then, were regarded as Bulgarians and its intelligentsia and revolutionaries self-identified predominantly as Macedonian Bulgarians. However, for the majority of Macedonian Slavs national identification was purely superficial and imposed by the educational and religious propaganda or by terrorism from armed bands. In 1903, Macedonian Bulgarians participated together with the Thracian Bulgarians in the unsuccessful Ilinden-Preobrazhenie Uprising against the Ottomans in Macedonia and the Adrianople Vilayet. The unsuccessful uprising intensified conflicts between Greece, Bulgaria and Serbia over securing the national interpreted church affiliation of the population. The Slavic villagers were forced to declare themselves for either of the sides, thus became divided into Bulgarophiles, Grecomans and Serbomans. The Young Turk Revolution of 1908 restored the Ottoman Parliament, which had been suspended by the Sultan in 1878. After the Revolution armed factions laid down their arms and joined the legal struggle. The Bulgarians founded the Peoples' Federative Party (Bulgarian Section) and the Union of the Bulgarian Constitutional Clubs and participated in Ottoman elections. Soon, the Young Turks turned increasingly Ottomanist and sought to suppress the national aspirations of the various minorities in Macedonia and Thrace.

In the Ottoman General Census of 1881/82, the Orthodox Christian population of the kazas currently falling within the borders of the Republic of North Macedonia identified, as follows:

Orthodox Christian ethnoconfessional groups as per 1881-82 Ottoman Census
| Kaza | Bulgarian Exarchist | | Greek/Serbian Patriarchist^{1} | |
| Kaza | Number | % | Number | % |
|---|---|---|---|---|
| Köprülü / Veles | 32,843 | 98.7 | 420 | 1.3 |
| Tikveş | 21,319 | 98.8 | 260 | 1.2 |
| Gevgili / Gevgelija | 5,784 | 28.4 | 14,558 | 71.6 |
| Toyran / Dojran | 5,605 | 77.0 | 1,591 | 22.1 |
| Usturumca/ Strumica | 2,974 | 17.8 | 13,726 | 82.2 |
| Üsküp / Skopje | 22,497 | 77.2 | 6,655 | 22.8 |
| Karatova / Kratovo | 19,618 | 99.8 | 35 | 0.2 |
| Kumanova / Kumanovo | 29,478 | 99.7 | 87 | 0.3 |
| Planka/ Kriva Palanka | 18,196 | 97.9 | 388 | 2.1 |
| İştip / Štip | 17,575 | 100 | 0 | - |
| Kaçana / Kočani | 33,120 | 99.8 | 83 | 0.8 |
| Radovişt / Radoviš | 7,364 | 100.0 | 0 | - |
| Kalkandelen / Tetovo^{2} | 19,660 | 66.3 | 8,980 | 33.7 |
| Monastir / Bitola | 61,494 | 60.0 | 41,077 | 40.0 |
| Ohri / Ohrid | 33,306 | 91.6 | 3,049 | 8.4 |
| Pirlepe / Prilep | 43,763 | 97.2 | 1,248 | 2.8 |
| Kirçova / Kičevo | 20,879 | 99.7 | 64 | 0.3 |
| Debre / Debar^{3} | 20,110 | 100.0 | 0 | - |
| Republic of North Macedonia borders | 415,585 | 81.8 | 92,221 | 18.2 |
^{1} A diverse group, including almost all Vlachs, most Orthodox Albanians as well as numerous Patriarchist Slavs.^{2} The data for Kalkandelen refers to males only: 9,830 Exarchists and 4,990 Patriarchists (19,660 and 8,980, resp., for both sexes).^{3} The kazas of Dibra and Reka were not included the 1881-1882 data disclosed by Karpat and instead feature with data from 1905-06. The quoted figure is 10,555 (males only), or 21,110 for both sexes.

Population of various ethnoconfessonal communities in the Adianople Vilayet according to the 1906/7 Ottoman census, in thousands, adjusted to round numbers.

Ethnoconfessional groups in the Adrianople Vilayet as per the 1906-07 Ottoman Census
1. Muslims (52.6%)
2. Greeks (29.0%)
3. Bulgarians (13.8%)
4. Armenians (2.21%)
5. Jews (2.04%)
6. Miscellaneous (0.37%)

| Groups | Edirne | Gümülcine | Kırklareli | Dedeağac | Tekirdağ | Gelibolu | Total |
|---|---|---|---|---|---|---|---|
| Muslims | 154 | 240 | 78 | 44 | 77 | 26 | 619 |
| Greeks | 103 | 22 | 71 | 28 | 53 | 65 | 341 |
| Bulgarians | 57 | 29 | 30 | 29 | 6 | 1 | 162 |
| Jews | 16 | 1 | 2 | – | 3 | 2 | 24 |
| Armenians | 5 | – | - | – | 19 | 1 | 26 |
| Others | 2 | - | – | - | 1 | - | 2 |
| Total | 317 | 292 | 181 | 89 | 159 | 96 | 1,176 |

=== Dissolution ===
The effect of the Balkan Wars in 1912–1913 was the partition of Ottoman Empire territories in Europe, which was followed by an anti-Bulgarian campaign in areas of Macedonia and Thrace, that came under Serbian and Greek administration. The Bulgarian churchmen were expelled, the Bulgarian schools were closed and the Bulgarian language was prohibited there. The Slavic population was proclaimed either as "Southern, i.e. Old Serbs" or as "Slavophone Greeks" there. In the Adrianople region, that the Ottomans managed to keep, the whole Thracian Bulgarian population was put to ethnic cleansing. As a consequence many Bulgarians fled from the territories of present-day Greece, North Macedonia and European Turkey to what is now Bulgaria. Subsequently, the Ottoman Empire lost virtually all of its possessions in the Balkans, which put a de facto end to the community of the Bulgarian millet.

== See also ==
- Bulgarian National Revival
- Greater Bulgaria
- National awakening of Bulgaria
- Slavic speakers in Ottoman Macedonia
- Destruction of the Thracian Bulgarians in 1913
- Serbianisation
- Geographical name changes in Greece
- Dobruja after 1878

== Sources ==
- Balkan cultural commonality and ethnic diversity. Raymond Detrez (Ghent University, Belgium).
- Vemund Aarbakke: Urban space and the Bulgarian Greek antagonism in Thrace, 1870–1912.
