= List of people from Strumica =

Below is a list of notable people born in Strumica, North Macedonia, or its surroundings.

- Džordže Arsov, mayor of Kisela Voda municipality
- Zoran Baldovaliev, football striker
- Mitko Čavkov, former interior minister of Macedonia
- Zoran Džorlev, violinist
- Vasil Garvanliev, singer
- Dragi Gjorgiev, academician
- Martin Guleski, architect and former university professor
- Vlado Ilievski, basketball player
- Blagoj Jankov Mučeto, partisan
- Vlado Kalember, pop singer
- Evangelos Koukoudeas, revolutionary and army officer
- Zoran Madžirov, musician
- Goran Maznov, football striker
- Blagoj Mučeto, Macedonian and Yugoslav partisan
- Goran Pandev, football striker
- Saško Pandev, football striker
- Anton Panov, writer
- Vidoe Podgorec, writer and poet
- Goran Popov, football defender, Sc Heerenveen
- Robert Popov, football defender
- Dimitrios Semsis, virtuoso violinist
- Kiro Stojanov, Roman Catholic Bishop of the Skopje Diocese
- Mirjana Lazarova Trajkovska, Macedonian judge
- Boris Trajkovski, former Macedonian president
- Goran Trenchovski, film and theatre director; founder and CEO of AsterFest
- Dimitrios Tsitsimis, revolutionary, soldier, and mayor of Kilkis
- Baba Vanga, clairvoyant
- Zoran Zaev, politician
