= History of the Eastern Orthodox Church under the Ottoman Empire =

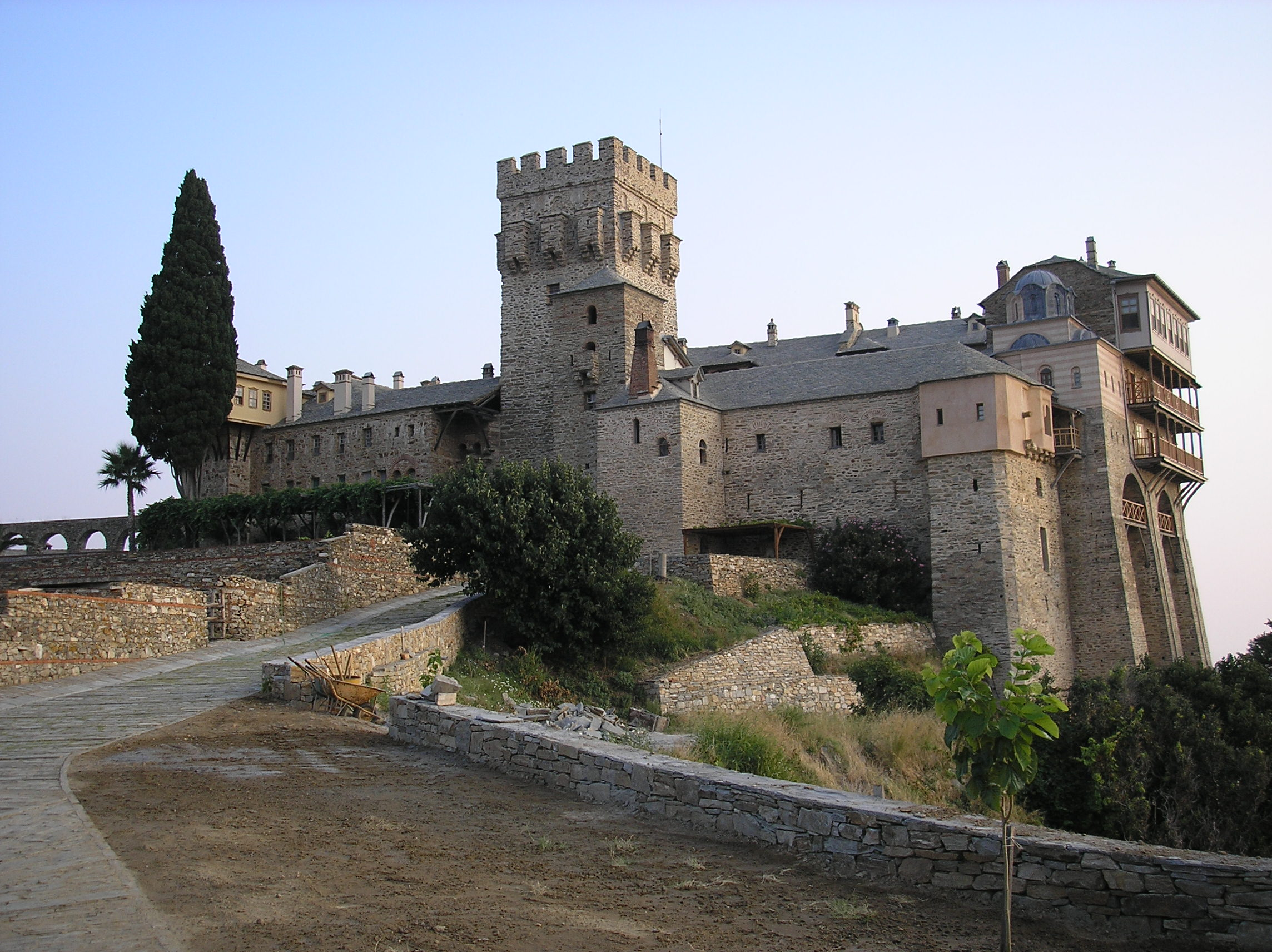
Stavronikita monastery, southeast view

In AD 1453, the city of Constantinople, the capital and last stronghold of the Byzantine Empire, fell to the Ottoman Empire. By this time, Egypt had been under Muslim control for about eight centuries. Jerusalem had been conquered by the Rashidun Caliphate Muslims in 638, won back by Rome in 1099 under the First Crusade, and then reconquered by Saladin's forces during the siege of Jerusalem in 1187. Later, in the seventh Crusade, it was briefly taken back by the Catholics once again. It was conquered by the Ottomans in 1517. Orthodoxy, however, was very strong in Russia which had recently acquired an autocephalous status; and thus Moscow called itself the Third Rome, as the cultural heir of Constantinople. Under Ottoman rule, all Orthodox Christians, regardless of their language, were placed into the Orthodox Christian millet (Rum millet), administered by the Greek-speaking Ecumenical Patriarch of Constantinople.

== Isolation from the West ==
As a result of the Ottoman conquest of the Byzantine Empire in 1453, and the Fall of Constantinople, the entire Orthodox communion of the Balkans and the Near East became suddenly isolated from the West. The Russian Orthodox Church was the only part of the Orthodox communion which remained outside the control of the Ottoman Empire.

It is, in part, due to this geographical and intellectual confinement that the voice of Eastern Orthodoxy was not heard during the Reformation in sixteenth century Europe. As a result, this important theological debate often seems strange and distorted to the Orthodox; after all, they never took part in it and thus neither Reformation nor Counter-Reformation is part of their theological framework.

== The Orthodox Church under the Ottoman Empire ==
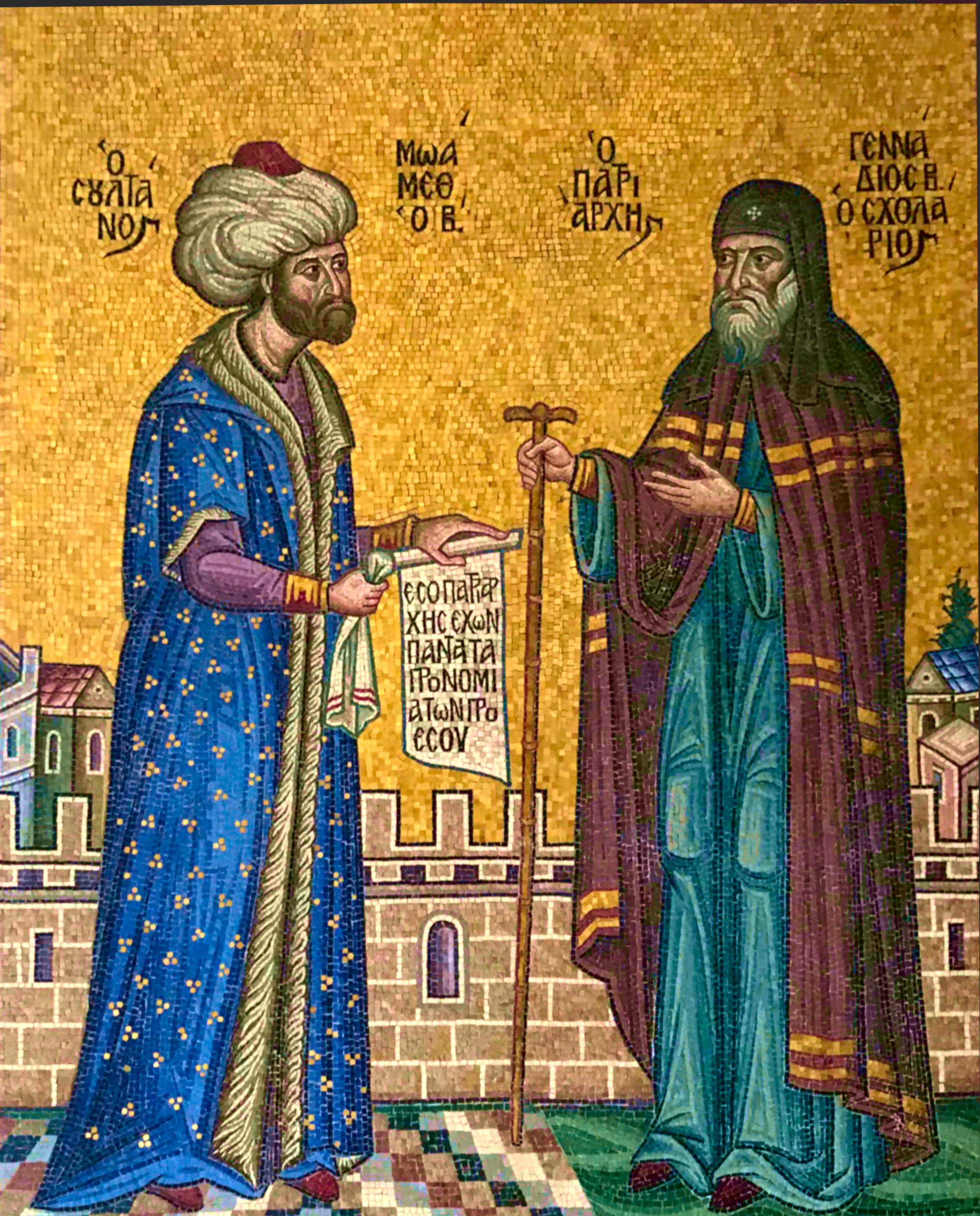
Sultan Mehmed II and the Patriarch Gennadios II.

Mehmed II allowed the Ecumenical Patriarchate to remain active after the fall of Constantinople in 1453.

Islam not only recognized Jesus as a great prophet, but tolerated Christians to a limited degree. Because Islamic law makes no distinction between nationality and religion, all Christians, regardless of their language or nationality, were considered a single Rum Millet (millet-i Rûm), i.e. Roman millet, or nation. In contrast to Catholicism which was associated with enemy Austria, the Orthodox Church was an accepted institution under the Ottomans, but the number of churches and monasteries was greatly reduced so as to make room for the new mosques being built, and the majority of churches became mosques during Ottoman rule. Only some churches were given maintenance and even more rarely were new ones built.

The majority of the city's inhabitants were converted to Islam from their original Eastern Orthodox Christian faith, and the Patriarch had less influence over the court and secular affairs, albeit his power did increase over other Orthodox ethnic groups.

As such, the Orthodox Church was not extinguished nor was its canonical and hierarchical organization completely destroyed. Its administration continued to function though in lesser degree, no longer being the state religion. One of the first things that Mehmet the Conqueror did was to allow the Church to elect a new patriarch, Gennadius Scholarius. The Hagia Sophia and the Parthenon, which had been Christian churches for nearly a millennium were converted into mosques, yet some other churches, both in Constantinople and elsewhere, remained in Christian hands. Many of these became mosques by the time the 16th century was coming to a close, like the Chora Church, for example. Many churches were also destroyed. They were endowed with civil as well as ecclesiastical power over all Christians in Ottoman territories. The patriarch, as the highest ranking hierarch, was thus invested with civil and religious authority and made ethnarch, head of the entire Christian Orthodox population. Practically, this meant that all Orthodox Churches within Ottoman territory were under the control of Constantinople. Thus, the authority and jurisdictional frontiers of the patriarch were enormously enlarged.

=== Establishment and development ===
After the Ottoman conquest of Constantinople in 1453, all its Orthodox Christians became part of the rayah class of people. The Rum millet was instituted by Sultan Mehmet II who set himself to reorganise the state as the conscious heir of the East Roman Empire. The Orthodox congregation was included in a specific ethno-religious community under Greco-Byzantine domination. Its name was derived from the Byzantine (Roman) subjects of the Ottoman Empire, but all Orthodox Greeks, Bulgarians, Albanians, Vlachs and Serbs, as well as Georgians and Arabs were considered part of the same millet in spite of their differences in ethnicity and language.

Belonging to this Orthodox commonwealth became more important to the common people than their ethnic origins. This community became basic form of social organization and source of identity for all the ethnic groups inside it and most people began to identify themselves simply as Christians. However, under Ottoman rule ethnonyms never disappeared, which indicates that some form of ethnic identification was preserved. This is evident from a Sultan's Firman from 1680 which lists the ethnic groups in the Balkan lands of the Empire as follows: Greeks (Rum), Albanians (Arnaut), Serbs (Sirf), Vlachs (Eflak) and the Bulgarians (Bulgar).

Christians were guaranteed some limited freedoms, but they were not considered equals to Muslims, and their religious practices would have to defer to those of Muslims, in addition to various other legal limitations. Converts to Islam who returned to Orthodoxy were given three chances to return to Islam. If they refused three times, males were put to death as apostates and females were imprisoned for life. Non-Muslims were not allowed to carry weapons or ride horses in the city of Konstantiniyye. Many individual Christians were made martyrs for stating their faith or speaking negatively against Islam.

The Ecumenical Patriarch was recognized as the highest religious and political leader, ethnarch of all Orthodox subjects. The Serbian Patriarchate of Peć with its seat in Patriarchal Monastery of Peć and the Archbishopric of Ohrid which were autonomous Orthodox Churches under the tutelage of the Ecumenical Patriarch were taken over by the Greek Phanariotes during the 18th century. The Treaty of Kuchuk-Kainarji from 1774, allowed Russia to intervene on the side of Ottoman Eastern Orthodox subjects, and most of the Porte's political tools of pressure became ineffective. At that time the Rum millet had a great deal of power — it set its own laws and collected and distributed its own taxes. The rise of nationalism in Europe under the influence of the French revolution had extended to the Ottoman Empire and the Rum millet became increasingly independent with the establishment of its own schools, churches, hospitals and other facilities. These activities effectively moved the Christian population outside the framework of the Ottoman political system.

=== Rise of nationalism and decline ===
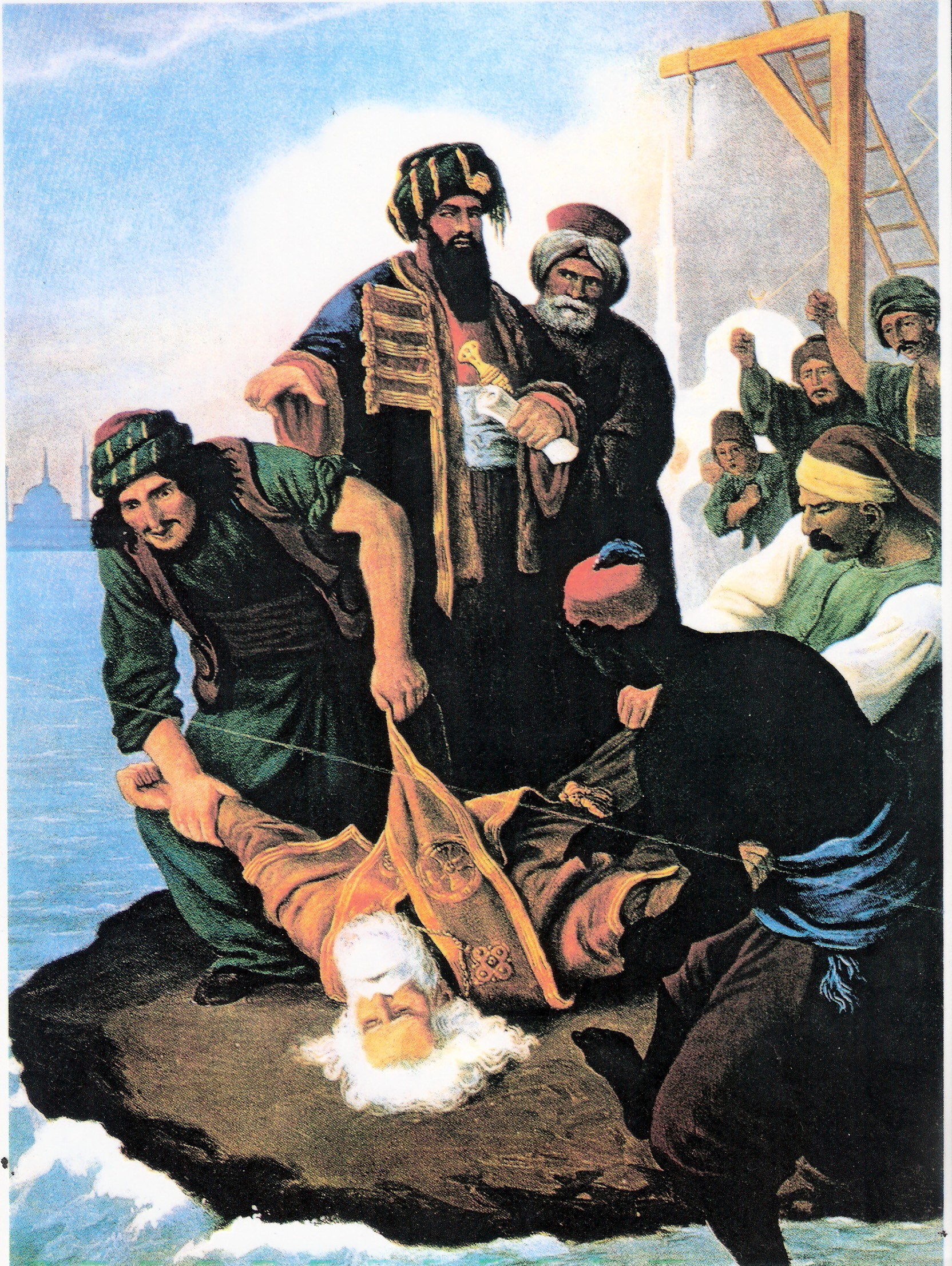
Painting by Peter von Hess depicting the casting of the corpse of Patriarch Gregory V of Constantinople into the Bosphorus, after he was hanged by the Ottomans in 1821

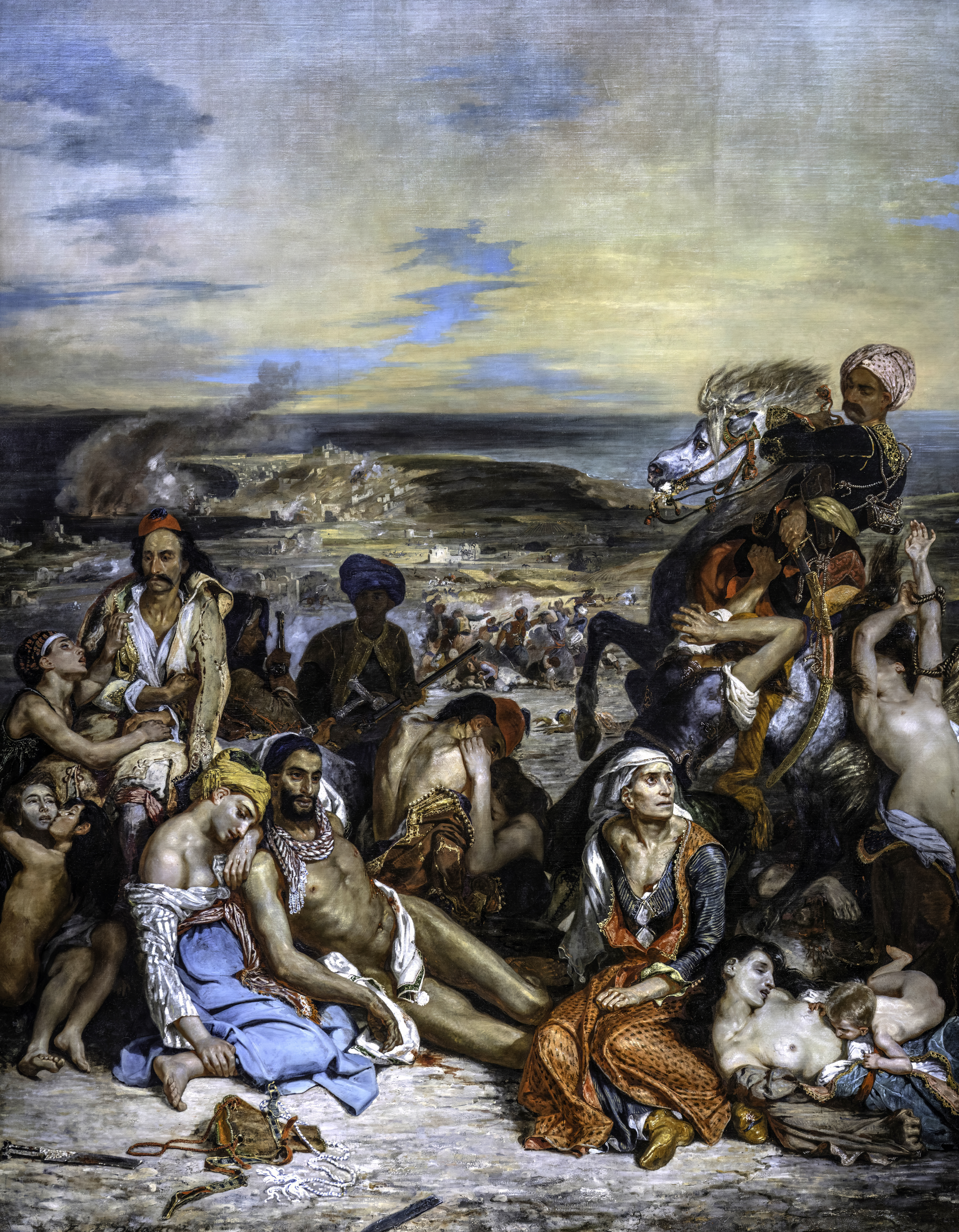
The Chios Massacre refers to the slaughter of tens of thousands of Greeks on the island of Chios by Ottoman troops in 1822.

In the early 19th century the Greek Orthodox intellectuals tried to reconceptualize the Rum Millet. They argued for a new, ethnic “Romaic” national identity and new Byzantine state, but their visions of a future state included all Balkan Orthodox Christians. This Megali Idea implied the goal of reviving the Eastern Roman Empire by establishing a new Greek state. It spread among the urban population of Vlach, Slavic and Albanian origin and it started to view itself increasingly as Greek. On the other hand, the Ottoman Tanzimat reforms in the middle of 19th century were aimed to encourage the Ottomanism among the secessionist subject nations and stop the nationalist movements within the Empire, but failed to succeed.

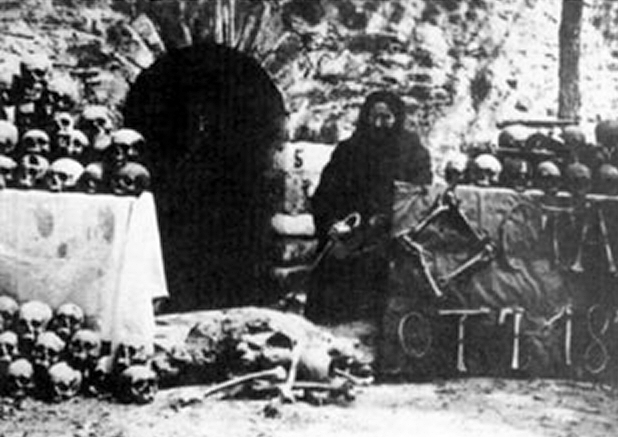
A postcard depicting human remains from the Batak massacre following the bloody suppression of the Bulgarian April Uprising of 1876. Author and date of the postcard is unknown.

With the rise of nationalism under the Ottoman Empire the Rum millet began to degrade with the continuous identification of the religious creed with ethnic nationality. The national awakening of each ethnic group inside it was complex and most of the groups interacted with each other. The Bulgarian Exarchate recognized by the Ottomans in 1870 was only a link in a series of events following the unilateral declaration of an autocephalous Orthodox Church of Greece in 1833 and of Romania in 1865. The 1877–1878 Russo-Turkish War dealt a decisive blow to Ottoman power in the Balkan Peninsula. The Serbian Orthodox Church also became autocephalous in 1879. The Albanians' fear that the lands they inhabited would be partitioned among neighbouring Montenegro, Serbia, Bulgaria and Greece fueled the rise of Albanian nationalism and the League of Prizren was founded. The recognition of Vlachs as a distinct millet in the Ottoman Empire in 1905, was the final straw in this Balkan nationalistic competition. As result, intense ethnic and national rivalries among the Balkan peoples emerged at the eve of the 20th century in Macedonia. That was followed by series of conflicts among Greeks (Grecomans), Serbs (Serbomans), Bulgarians (Bulgarophiles) and Vlachs (Rumanophiles) into the region.

The Young Turk Revolution of 1908 restored the Parliament, which had been suspended by the Sultan in 1878. However, the process of supplanting the monarchic institutions was unsuccessful and the European periphery of the Empire continued to splinter under the pressures of local revolts. Subsequently, with the Balkan Wars, the Ottoman Empire lost virtually all of its possessions in the Balkans, which put de facto to end the community of the Rum millet.

== Corruption ==
The Orthodox Church found itself subject to the Ottoman system of corruption. The patriarchal throne was frequently sold to the highest bidder, while new patriarchal investiture was accompanied by heavy payment to the government. In order to recoup their losses, patriarchs and bishops taxed the local parishes and their clergy.

Nor was the patriarchal throne ever secure. Few patriarchs between the fifteenth and the nineteenth centuries died a natural death while in office. The forced abdications, exiles, hangings, drownings, and poisonings of patriarchs are well documented. But if the patriarch's position was precarious, so was the hierarchy's. The hanging of patriarch Gregory V from the gate of the patriarchate on Easter Sunday 1821 was accompanied by the execution of two metropolitans and twelve bishops.

== Devshirmeh ==
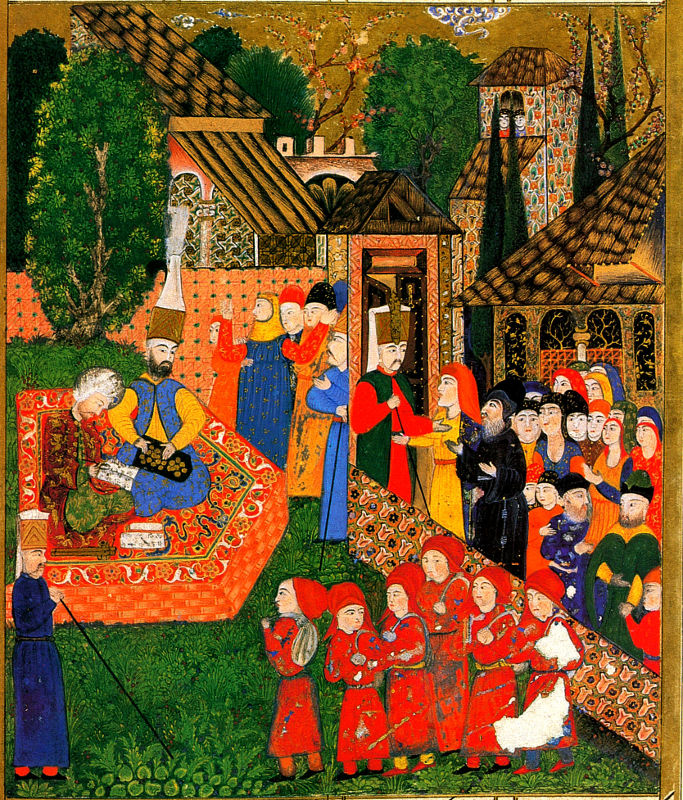
Registration of Christian boys for the devşirme. Ottoman miniature painting from the Süleymanname, 1558.

Devshirmeh or "blood tax" was the system of forcibly taking young boys from conquered Christian lands as a form of taxation, in order to build a loyal slave army, formerly largely composed of war captives, and the class of military administrators called the "Janissaries", or other servants such as tellak in hamams. The word devşirme means "collecting, gathering" in Ottoman. Boys delivered to the Ottomans in this way were called ghilmán or acemi oglanlar ("novice boys").

== Fall of the Ottoman Empire in the East ==
The fall of the Ottoman was precipitated by the Roman Catholic and Eastern Orthodox disputed possession of the Church of the Nativity and the Church of the Holy Sepulchre in Jerusalem. During the early 1850s, the two sides made demands which the Sultan could not possibly satisfy simultaneously. In 1853, the Sultan adjudicated in favour of the French, despite the vehement protestations of the local Orthodox monks.

The ruling Ottoman siding with Rome over the Orthodox provoked out right war (see the Eastern Question). As the Ottoman Empire had been for sometime falling into political, social and economic decay (see the Sick Man of Europe) this conflict ignited the Crimean War in 1850 between Russia and the Ottoman Empire.

== Persecution by the Young Turks ==
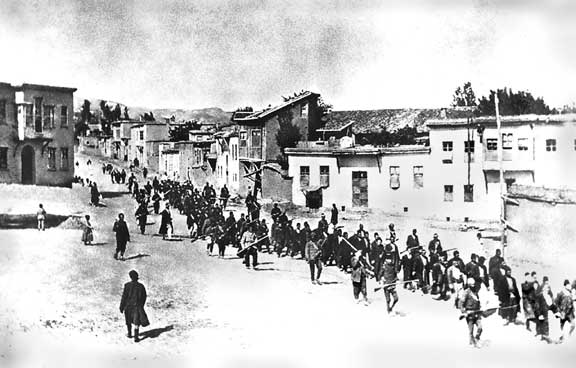
Armenian civilians are marched to a nearby prison in Mezireh by armed Turkish soldiers, April 1915

During 1894–1923 the Ottoman Empire conducted a policy of genocide against the Christian population living within its extensive territory. The Sultan, Abdul Hamid, issued an official governmental policy of genocide against the Armenians of the Ottoman Empire in 1894. Systematic massacres took place in 1894-1896 when Abdul killed 300,000 Armenians throughout the provinces. In 1909 government troops killed, in the towns of Adana alone, over 20,000 Christian Armenians.

When World War I broke out, the Ottoman Empire was ruled by the Young Turks that allied the empire with Germany. In the 20th century, the number of Orthodox Christians, and of Christians in general, in the Anatolian peninsula sharply declined amidst complaints of Ottoman governmental repression of various Eastern and Oriental Orthodox groups.

In the first two decades of the 20th century, there were massacres of Greeks, Slavs, and Armenians in the Ottoman Empire, culminating in the Armenian, Greek and Assyrian genocides.

== See also ==
- Ottoman Greece
- Christianity in the Ottoman Empire
- History of Eastern Christianity
- History of Christianity
- Christian Church

== Sources ==
- Frazee, Charles A. (2006) [1983]. Catholics and Sultans: The Church and the Ottoman Empire 1453-1923. Cambridge: Cambridge University Press. ISBN 9780521027007.
