= Pantelis Papaioannou =

- Παντελής Παπαϊωάννου; Панде Атанасов
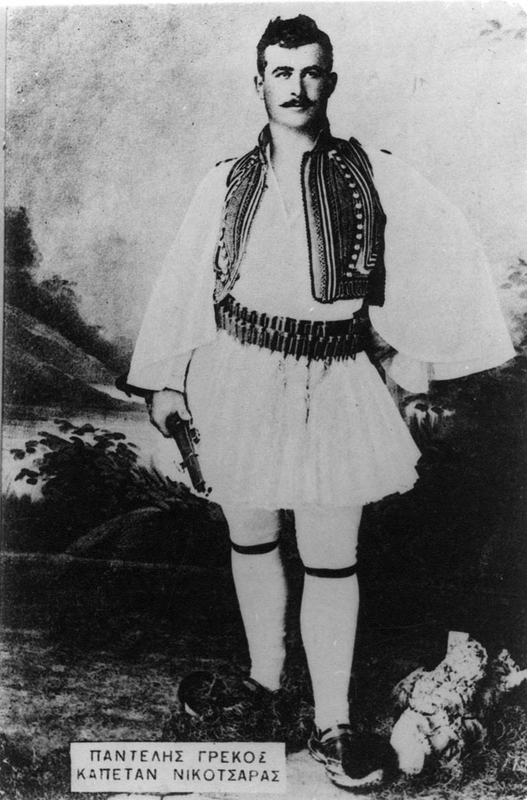
- Papaioannou wearing the Greek Foustanella c. 1904-1907
- Born: c. 1880s Kolešino, Salonika Vilayet, Ottoman Empire (now Republic of North Macedonia)
- Died: 8 September 1907
- Burial place: Kolešino, Republic of North Macedonia
- Relatives: Charalambos Boufidis (cousin)
- Military career
- Allegiance: IMRO (Initially); Kingdom of Greece
- Branch: HMC
- Nicknames: Kapetan Nikotsaras; Καπετάν Νικοτσάρας; Pantelis Grekos; Παντελής Γραικός
- Conflicts: Macedonian Struggle †

Pantelis Papaioannou or Grekos (Greek: Παντελής Παπαϊωάννου) was a Greek chieftain of the Macedonian Struggle known by the nom de guerre Kapetan Nikotsaras (Καπετάν Νικοτσάρας).

== Early life ==
Papaioannou was born in the 1880s in Kolešino, then Ottoman Empire (now Republic of North Macedonia). He was a Slavophone Patriarchist with strong Greek consciousness. He was the first cousin of fellow Makedonomachos Charalambos Boufidis.

== Macedonian Struggle ==
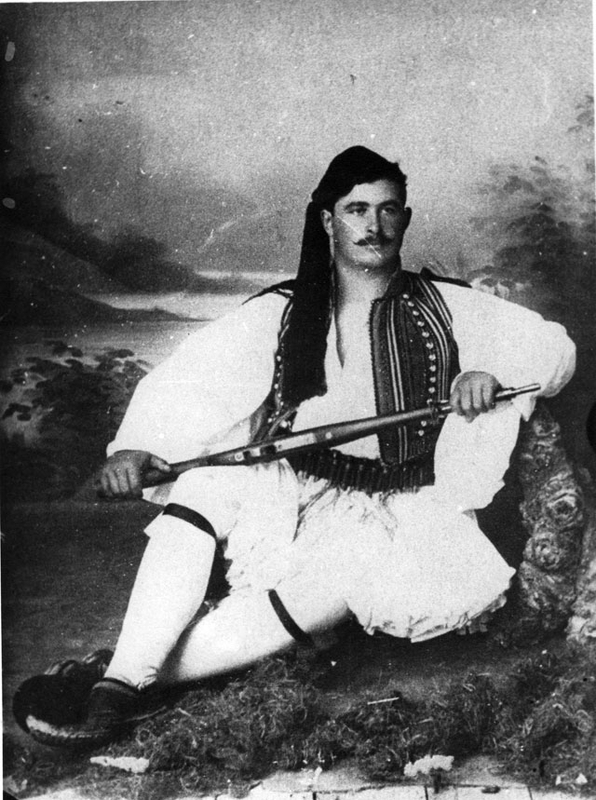

He initially worked as a secretary of Boris Sarafov until 1903, but after realizing the real purposes of IMRO towards the Greek population, he travelled to Athens where he received military training. He then returned to his homeland joining the Greek Struggle for Macedonia, setting up a small armed group of Greeks from Strumica which initially acted near the Giannitsa Lake against the Bulgarian komitadjis. He cooperated with many chieftains, including Gonos Yiotas and Theocharis Kougas from Gidas. He later acted near his hometown, in the wider Novo Selo area. Papaioannou had been successful in recruiting men from the area, however, one of the recruits had an Exarchist father-in-law by the name of Peche, who immediately notified the Ottomans of their location. Papaioannou and his men were encircled but miraculously managed to escape with only one casualty.

== Death ==
A month later, Peche discovered their whereabouts and once again notified the Ottomans. Papaioannou and the majority of his armed group were killed in action on 8 September 1907 after the betrayal which lead to a battle against a large Ottoman army detachment. This made his cousin Charalambos Boufidis or from then known by the nom de guerre Kapetan Fourtounas join the struggle and avenge his death, acting against the Bulgarian Komitadjis and finally killing Peche who had betrayed Papaioannou.

Pantelis Papaioannou was buried in his home village of Kolešino.

== Legacy ==
His death led to a surge in local Greeks of his home region to join the struggle.

The central street of Kilkis is named "Kapetan Nikotsaras" in his honour.

There is also a bust of him in a park in Kilkis.

The Bulgarians consider him a Grecoman renegade.
