= Slavic speakers of Macedonia =

The term Slavic speakers of Macedonia may refer to:

- Slavic speakers in Ottoman Macedonia, an ethnolinguistic group
- Slavic speakers of Greek Macedonia, a linguistic minority residing in Greek Macedonia.
