= Kolešino Falls =

Coordinates: 41°22′07″N 22°48′25″E

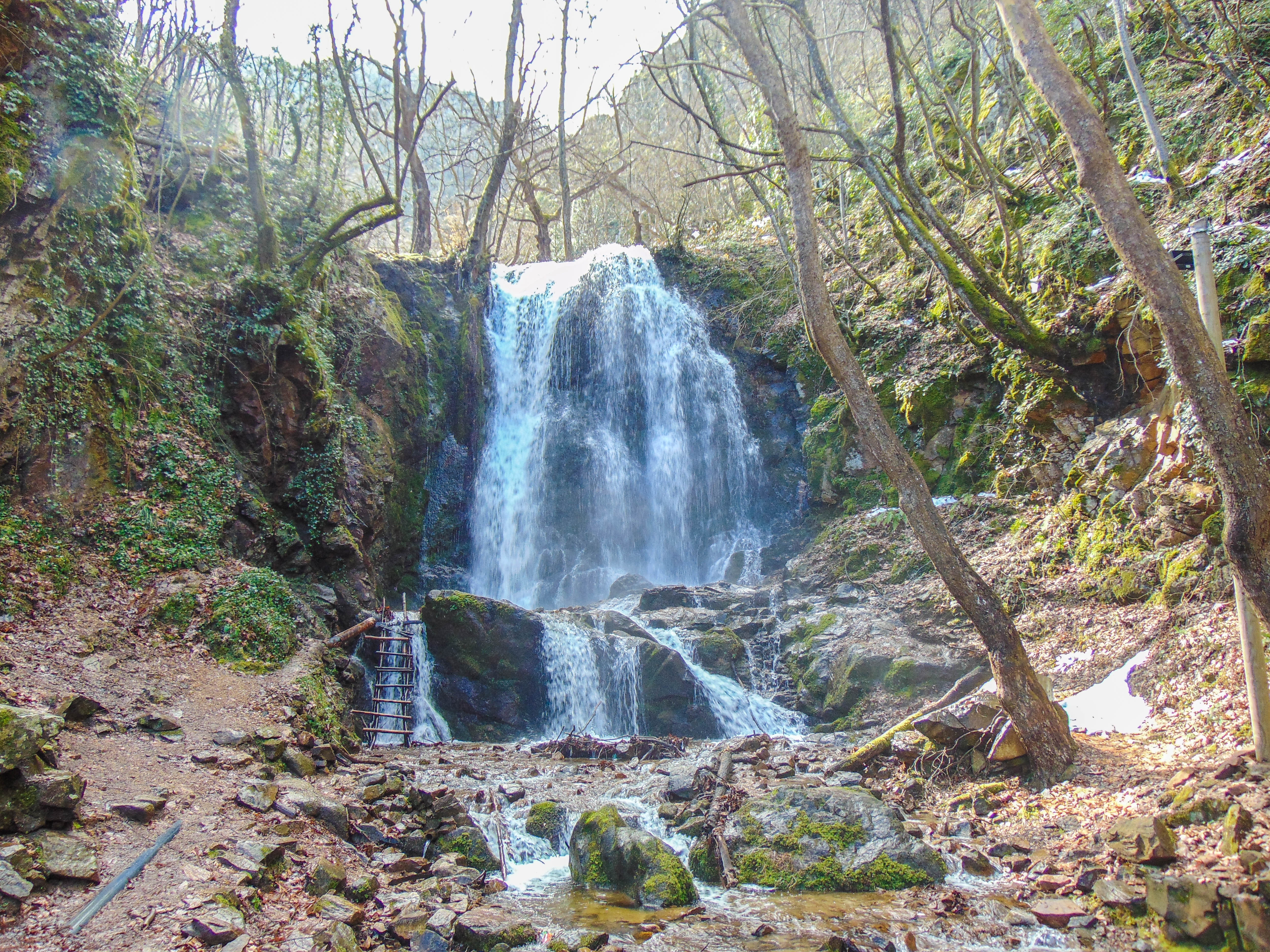
- Kolešino Falls in 2018
- Interactive map of Kolešino Falls
- Location: Municipality of Novo Selo, North Macedonia
- Longest drop: 15 m (49 ft)

Kolešino Falls (Macedonian: Колешински Водопад) is a waterfall located above the village of Kolešino in the Municipality of Novo Selo in the southeastern region of North Macedonia.

Flowing from the Baba River, the waterfall is found at an elevation of 610 metres on the Mount Belasica. The waterfall gently falls over the stone cliffs nestled in the forest of Mount Belasica at a height of 19 metres (62 ft.) in multiple watery streams only to reform into the river below.

The waterfall changes in intensity every season. In the winter, fragile streams can become frozen and in the spring, strengthened by the recent rainfalls, the gentle streams rush more powerfully over the cliff sides.

Kolešino Falls is a major tourist attraction for the Municipality of Novo Selo. It is open year-round, and the site is continually being developed to meet the needs of visitors. Currently, the site has a wooden bridge to view the waterfall, benches to take a brief rest and even a picnic area with a covered gazebo and grilling area. The municipality has long-term plans to build a restaurant and hotel near the site, as well as additional walking paths and improvements to the access road.

== See also ==
- List of waterfalls
