= Bulgarophiles =

Term describing certain Slavic people

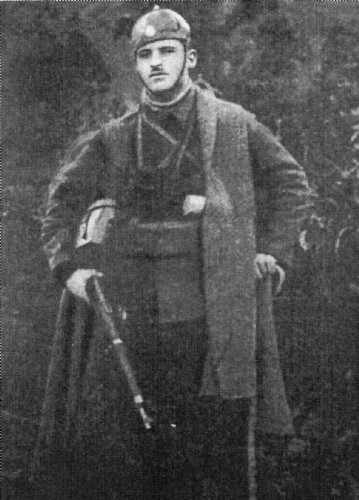
Nikola Gulev (born Lakia Guli), an IMRO revolutionary of Aromanian descent and son of Pitu Guli

Bulgarophiles (Bulgarian: българофили, romanized: bălgarofili; Serbian and Macedonian: бугарофили, romanized: bugarofili; Greek: βουλγαρόφιλοι, romanized: boulgarófiloi; Romanian: bulgarofilii) or Bugaraši (Serbian and Macedonian: бугараши), is a pejorative term used for Slavic people from the regions of Macedonia and Pomoravlje who identify as ethnic Bulgarians. In Bulgaria, the term Bulgaromans; (Bulgarian: българомани, romanized: bălgaromani; Romanian: bulgaromani) refers to non-Slavic people such as Aromanians with a Bulgarian self-awareness.

It was only after the Serbian revolution and subsequent Serbian independence when the Serbian national idea gained finally momentum in what is today Southern and Eastern Serbia. According to different authors ca. 1850 the delineation between Serbs and Bulgarians ran north of Niš. On the other hand, according to historian Apostolos Vacalopoulos, from the beginning of the 18th century, the Bulgarians in Macedonia formed the largest Slavic community and had gradually absorbed the sparse Serbs in the area. As a result, after the rise of nationalism in the Ottoman Empire, the Slavic-speakers there, already Bulgarian by name, began to acquire mainly a Bulgarian national identity. During the 19th and early 20th century the Bulgarian national identification arose as a result of an educational campaign and the affiliation with the Bulgarian millet and Bulgarian Exarchate. In the 20th century, Bulgarophiles in neighboring Yugoslavia and Greece were considered enemies of the state harboring irredentist tendencies.

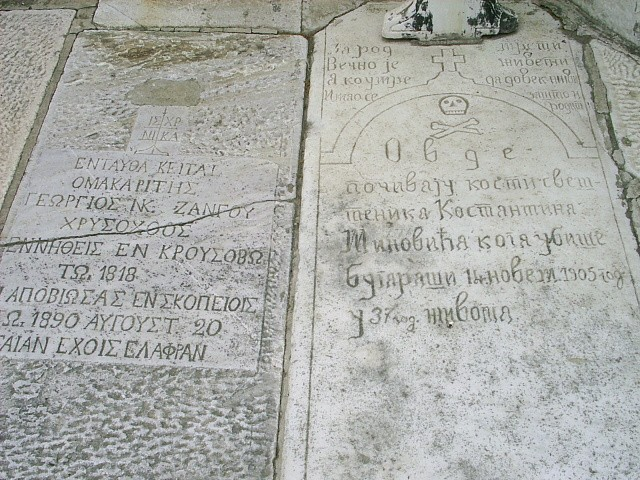
Plaque on the grave of priest Konstantin Minovic (Konstantin Minov) in Skopje. He swiched from the Bulgarian to the Serbian side and was killed on the order of the IMRO. The plaque was placed after the area was ceded to Serbia in 1913 and states that he was killed by Bugaraši.

Adherents of the view that the Macedonian nation is a 20th century phenomenon and that it has close relation with the Bulgarian nation get accused of being Bulgarophiles in North Macedonia. In the context of North Macedonia, the term also means feeling a close ethnic relation with Bulgarians or being of Bulgarian origin.

== See also ==
- Serbomans
- Grecomans
- Macedonian Bulgarians
- Bulgarians in Serbia
