= Vidoe Podgorec =

Macedonian writer and poet

- Born: June 8, 1934; Kolešino; Kingdom of Yugoslavia
- Died: April 14, 1997; Skopje (North Macedonia) Republic of Macedonia
- Occupation: Author

Vidoe Podgorec (Macedonian: Видое Подгорец; 8 June 1934 – 14 April 1997) was a Macedonian writer and poet. He was born in Kolešino near Strumica and lived in Skopje. He wrote for children and adults and published a great number of poems, stories and novels.

One of his most famous novels is The White Gypsy (Белото циганче).
