= Kolešino =

Kolešino Колешино
- Village
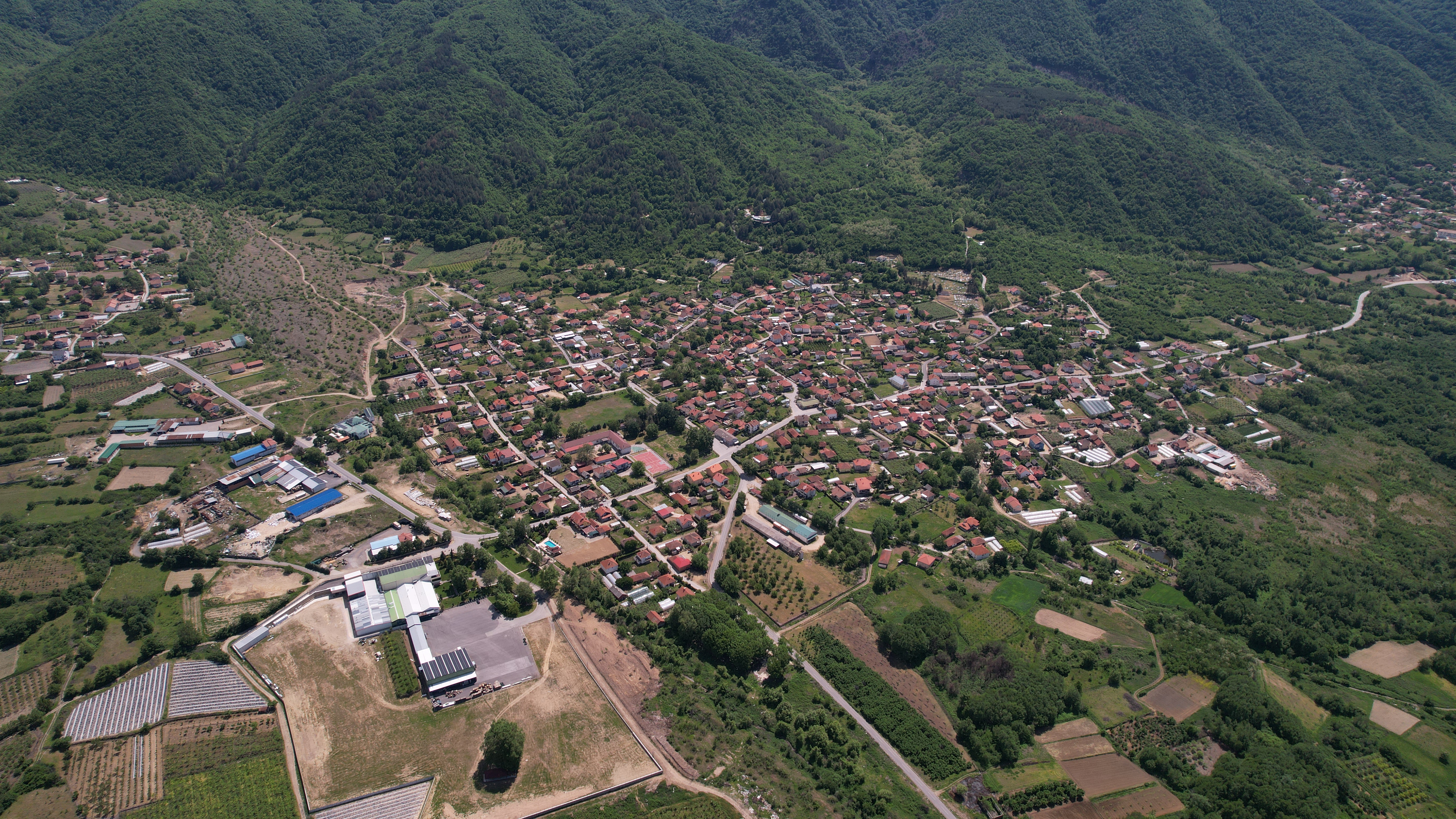
- Air view of Kolešino

- Location within North Macedonia
- Coordinates: 41°22′53.2″N 22°48′49.1″E
- Country: North Macedonia
- Region: Southeastern
- Municipality: Novo Selo

Population
  - Total: 632
- Time zone: UTC+1 (CET)
- Area code: 034

Kolešino (Macedonian: Колешино) is a village in the municipality of Novo Selo, North Macedonia. It is located four kilometers from the border with Greece and nine kilometers from Bulgaria. Kolešino is at the base of the Belasica Mountains.

== History ==
According to local lore, Kolešino's name originates from the Battle of Belasica (also known as the Battle of Kleidion or Battle of Belasitsa), as kolenje means slaughter. The battle occurred on 29 July 1014 between the Byzantine Empire and the Bulgarian Empire.

Kolešino is best known for Kolešino Falls, a waterfall located just south of the village, elevated in the Belasica Mountains.

== Demographics ==
According to the 2002 census, the village had a total of 845 inhabitants. Ethnic groups in the village include:

- Macedonians 838
- Serbs 3
- Others 4

As of 2021, the village of Kolešino has 632 inhabitants and the ethnic composition was the following:

- Macedonians – 609
- Serbs – 1
- others – 4
- Person without Data - 18

== People from Kolešino ==
- Charalambos Boufidis, Greek chieftain of the Macedonian Struggle
- Pantelis Papaioannou, Greek chieftain of the Macedonian Struggle
