= Kratovo =

Kratovo may refer to:

- Kratovo, North Macedonia, a town in North Macedonia
- Kratovo Municipality, a municipality in North Macedonia
- Kratovo (Priboj), a village in the municipality of Priboj, Serbia
- Kratovo, Russia, an urban locality (a suburban (dacha) settlement) in Moscow Oblast, Russia
