= Charalambos Boufidis =

Greek chieftain of the Macedonian Struggle

- Χαράλαμπος Μπουφίδης
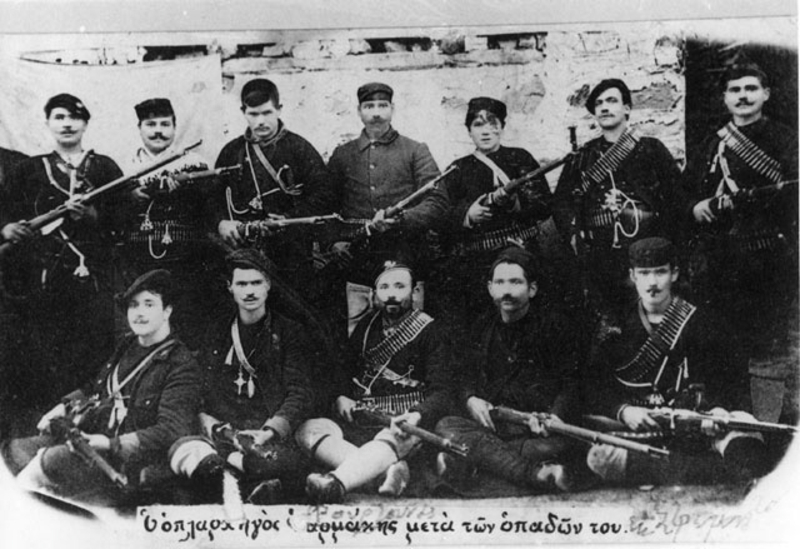
- Charalambos Boufidis seated second from the left.
- Born: c. 1880s Kolešino, Salonika Vilayet, Ottoman Empire (now Republic of North Macedonia)
- Relatives: Pantelis Papaioannou (cousin)
- Military career
- Allegiance: Kingdom of Greece
- Branch: HMC
- Nicknames: Kapetan Fourtounas; Καπετάν Φουρτούνας
- Conflicts: Macedonian Struggle

Charalambos Boufidis (Greek: Χαράλαμπος Μπουφίδης), also known with the nom de guerre Kapetan Fourtounas (Καπετάν Φουρτούνας), was a significant Slavophone Greek chieftain of the Macedonian Struggle.

== Biography ==
He was born in the 1880s in Kolešino of Strumica, then part of the Ottoman Empire (now Republic of North Macedonia). He was the first cousin of fellow chieftain Pantelis Papaioannou. When his cousin was killed in 1907, he took over the command of his armed group. He also recruited young people from the surrounding villages. He decided to avenge the death of his cousin, leaving his wife and child in Kolešino.

=== Armed action ===
He acted with his body in the regions of Strumica, Petrich and in the Belasica mountain range. His armed group was strengthened by uniting with the group of the chieftain Dimitrios Tsitsimis, which consisted of local Greeks of Strumica region. Together they managed to oppose a strong resistance to the action of the Bulgarian komitadjis. With their actions they also managed to gain full control of the Belasica mountain range. At the beginning of January 1908, Boufidis avenged the death of his cousin by executing Peche, who had betrayed Papaioannou, on the latter's tomb in Kolešino. The same year, Boufidis cooperated with the Hellenic Army officer Vasileios Tsirogiannis, who guided the rebels of the Strumica region.

== Sources ==
- D. Papakonstantinou, Υπόμνημα περί της καταστάσεως του ελληνισμού εν τη επαρχία Στρωμνίτσης, Athens, 1882.
- Konstantinos A. Vakalopoulos, Ο ένοπλος αγώνας στη Μακεδονία 1904–1908, publications Ηρόδοτος, Thessaloniki, 1999, p. 287, 324
