= Serbomans =

Bulgarian pejorative term

Serbomans (Serbo-Croatian and Macedonian: србомани, romanized: srbomani; Bulgarian: сърбомани, romanized: sărbomani; Romanian: sârbomani) is a Bulgarian pejorative term used by Bulgarian nationalists for inhabitants in the region of Macedonia that claimed Serbian ethnicity (declared as Serbs) and supported Serbian national ideals until the middle of the 20th century. They explained it as being imposed by Serbian propaganda promulgating a secondary identity, which resulted in a Bulgarian population that had lost its real nationality. The term first appeared during the time of the Serbian-Bulgarian rivalry for present-day North Macedonia during the second half of the 19th and the beginning of 20th century.

== See also ==
- Serbophilia
- Grecomans
- Bulgarophiles
