= Georgios Karaiskakis (chieftain) =

Greek revolutionary chieftain of the Macedonian Struggle

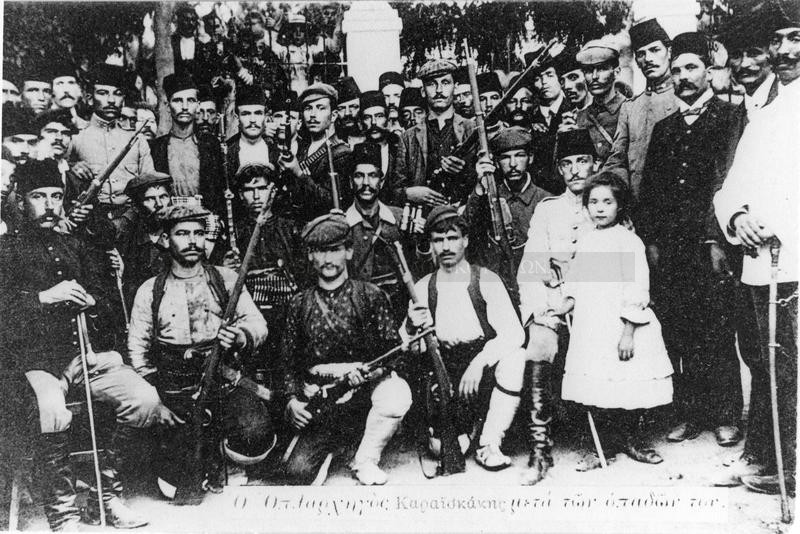
- Georgios Karaiskakis and other revolutionaries c. 1906
- Native name: Γεώργιος Καραϊσκάκης
- Born: c. 1880s Bogdanci, Salonika Vilayet, Ottoman Empire (now Republic of North Macedonia)
- Died: 1910 Strumica, Salonika Vilayet, Ottoman Empire (now Republic of North Macedonia)
- Allegiance: Kingdom of Greece
- Branch: HMC
- Service years: 1904-1910
- Conflicts: Macedonian Struggle †

Georgios Karaiskakis (Greek: Γεώργιος Καραϊσκάκης) was a Greek revolutionary chieftain of the Macedonian Struggle.

== Biography ==
Karaiskakis was born in the 1880s in Bogdanci, then Ottoman Empire (now North Macedonia). In 1904 he was ranked in "Macedonian Defense" and took action with his body in the areas of Gevgelija, Bogdanci, Strumica and Polykastro against Bulgarian komitadjis. Particularly in the area of Polykastro he became the fear of the komitadjis, who used that area as their hideout. He collaborated with various Greek armed forces as the chieftain of his own team and after he had exterminated the komitadjis in the lakes of Artzanis - Amatotovos (now dried), he acted in the region of Strumica, where he fought against the Bulgarian komitadjis until the revolution of the Young Turks in 1908. After 1908, new Bulgarian armed groups acted in Strumica who came from Bulgaria, so Karaiskakis rejoined the armed actions.

== Death ==
Eventually, after 2 years (in 1910), he was killed in the region of Strumica in a battle with an armed group of Bulgarian komitadjis. A bust has been set up to honour him in Evzonoi, Kilkis.

== Sources ==
- Παιονία και Παίονες από τα μυθικά χρόνια ως την τουρκοκρατία, Χρήστος Ίντος, Γουμένισσα 1983
- Κέντρα Οργάνωσης, Δράσης και Αντίστασης των Ελλήνων στο Ν. Κιλκίς κατά την περίοδο του Μακεδονικού Αγώνα, Χρήστος Ίντος, Εταιρεία Μακεδονικών Σπουδών, Επιστημονικό Συνέδριο «Μακεδονικός Αγών», 100 χρόνια από το θάνατο του Παύλου Μελά, 12-13 November 2004, Macedonian Library, no. 100, Thessaloniki 2006
