= Evangelos Koukoudeas =

Greek guerrilla fighter

- Ευάγγελος Κουκουδέας
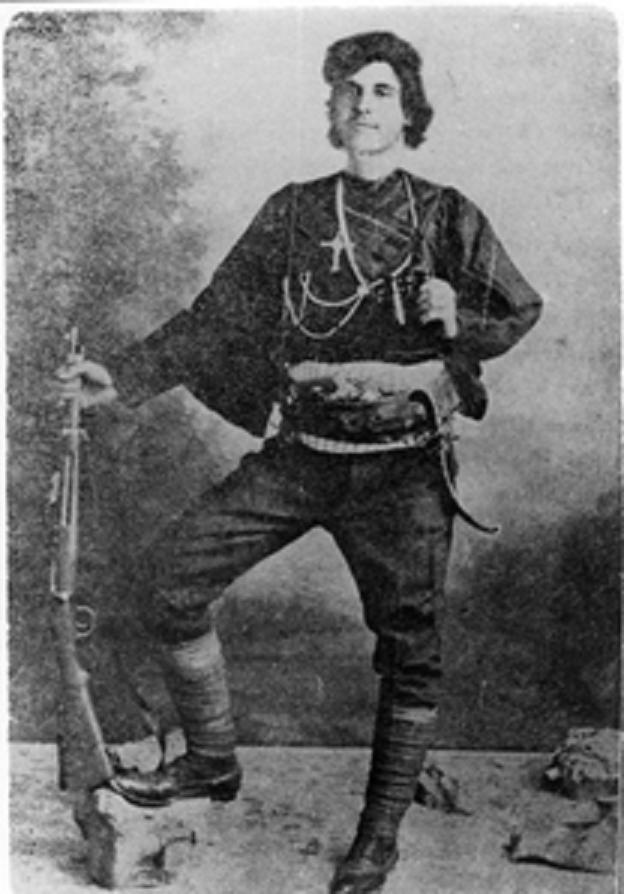
- Koukoudeas during the Macedonian Struggle
- Born: Late 19th century Üstrümce, Salonika Vilayet, Ottoman Empire (now Strumica, Republic of North Macedonia)
- Military career
- Allegiance: Kingdom of Greece; Free State of Ikaria; Aut. Rep. of Northern Epirus
- Branch: Hellenic Army
- Rank: Colonel
- Conflicts: Macedonian Struggle; Ikarian Revolution; Balkan Wars; First Balkan War; Battle of Chios; Second Balkan War; North Epirote Struggle; World War I; Macedonian front; Greco-Turkish War (1919-1922)

Evangelos Koukoudeas (Greek: Ευάγγελος Κουκουδέας) was a Greek guerrilla fighter in the Macedonian Struggle and the North Epirote Struggle for Autonomy, hero of the Balkan Wars, and officer of the First World War and Greco-Turkish War (1919–1922).

== Biography ==
Koukoudeas was born in Üstrümce, then part of the Ottoman Empire (now Strumica, North Macedonia) at the end of the 19th century. He came from an old and important family of Strumica. Famous relatives of him were the violinist Dimitrios Koukoudeas or Semsis and the teacher of Strumica's Girls' School, Aikaterini Koukoudea. After graduating from the Greek school in his hometown, he travelled to Athens in 1905 to escape the Bulgarian attacks and to be enrolled in the armed groups being gathered for the Macedonian Struggle. He was also enlisted in the Hellenic Navy as a leading seaman.

== Macedonian Struggle ==
After his military service, he went to Macedonia and fought in the region of the Giannitsa Lake under the general command of Ioannis Demestichas.

On February 14, 1907, the united Greek bodies under Demestichas, Evangelos Koukoudeas, Nikolaos Zafeiriou from Chalkidiki and several other Macedonian and Cretan soldiers active in the Lake started from Tsekri (modern Paralimni, Pella) and attacked the Komitadji K. Delithanasis, in Bozej (modern Athyra, Pella). The attack was successful, killing the Komitadji and several of his men barricaded in the former's home. Eventually they left as an Ottoman military detachment appeared in the village.

In March 1907, he was the leader of a small group involved in operations against Komitadjis in Koufalia. He fought in the area of the Lake until the end of the Macedonian Struggle.

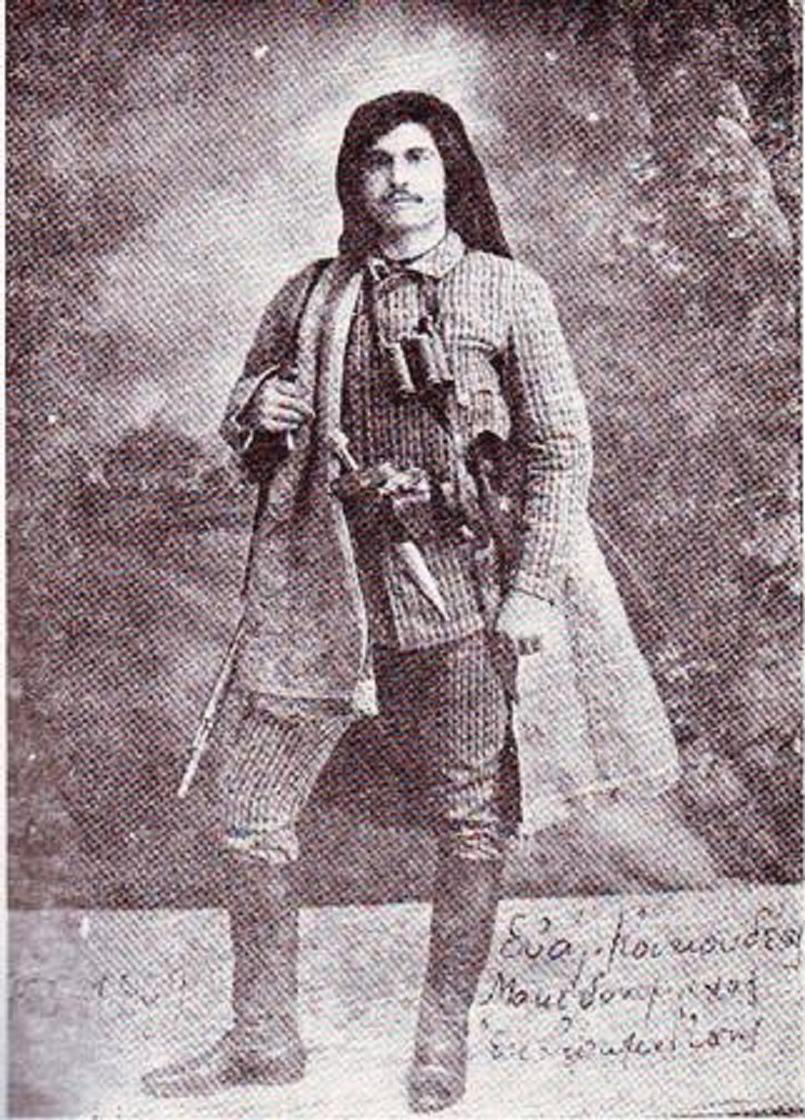
The chieftain Evangelos Koukoudeas

Ioannis Demestichas wrote about Koukoudeas (translation from Greek):

...His long hair, and his modesty remind the hero of the Revolution Athanasios Diakos. He overflows from patriotic enthusiasm, controlled enthusiasm, without exaggerations.

...I had full confidence on him and I was sure he would do his job under the most difficult circumstances. He would rather die fighting than abandon me in case of danger..

== Balkan Wars ==
Before the Balkan Wars, during the Italo-Turkish War (1911-1912) while the Italians had occupied the Dodecanese, he went to Icaria and helped Ioannis Malachias in the revolution against the Ottomans in July 1912, that set up the Free State of Icaria to prevent the island from being occupied by the Italians.

He then created a group of Icarian volunteers for participation in the First Balkan War and disembarked in Chios on 14 December 1912, where he took part in the Battle of Volissos and the Battle of Aipos during the Greek occupation of the island.

== Northern Epirus, First World War and Greco-Turkish War ==
After the end of the Balkan Wars he fought for the Autonomous Republic of Northern Epirus. He then moved to the United States of America, where after the National Defence coup d'état in Thessaloniki and Greece's entry into World War I, he organized a militia to facilitate the transfer of volunteers to Greece. During the World War he fought as a reserve infantry officer, and was eventually commissioned into the Hellenic Army as a second lieutenant.

He participated in the Greco-Turkish War (1919–1922), where he was captured by the Turks. After his liberation and the end of the war, he continued his career with the Hellenic Army, reaching the rank of colonel.

== Sources ==
- Petros G. Karakasonis, Ιστορία της απελευθερώσεως της Χίου κατά το 1912. [History of the Liberation of Chios in 1912]
- Gardikas, Ο ναύαρχος Ιωάννης Ν. Δεμέστιχας, Athens 1964 [Admiral Ioannis Demestichias]
- Museum of Macedonian Struggle, Photography Collection, Evangelos Koukoudeas
