= Dimitrios Tsitsimis =

Greek politician and soldier

Kapetan (Chieftain) Dimitrios Tsitsimis
- Native name: Δημήτριος Τσιτσίμης
- Born: Late 1800s Üstrümce, Salonika Vilayet, Ottoman Empire (now Strumica, North Macedonia)
- Allegiance: Kingdom of Greece
- Branch: HMC; Hellenic Army
- Conflicts: Macedonian Struggle; Balkan Wars: First Balkan War; Second Balkan War
- Other work: Tobacco Trader; Mayor of Kilkis

Dimitrios Tsitsimis (Greek: Δημήτριος Τσιτσίμης) was a Greek chieftain of the Macedonian Struggle.

== Biography ==
Tsitsimis was born in the late 19th century in Üstrümce, then Ottoman Empire (now Strumica, North Macedonia). He was a tobacco trader in the profession but quickly took action to contribute to the Macedonian Struggle. He initially joined Georgios Karaiskakis' armed group, a local of Bogdanci, who became a coleader. He then set up his own small armed group and became leader. He acted in the regions of Strumica, Gevgelija, nearby Doiran Lake and Kilkis. For some time he was the leader of the militia of the village Gabrovo of Strumica. He was pursued by the Bulgarian komitadjis and the Ottoman authorities but was never caught.

During the Balkan Wars he participated as a volunteer and undertook various missions in Central Macedonia, as a detector and guide of the Hellenic Army. After the end of the Second Balkan War and the migration of the Greeks of Strumica, he settled in Kilkis where he continued to practice his profession, tobacco trading. He was the first Greek mayor of Kilkis. He was also the director of the first group of scouts of Kilkis.

For his national action, he was awarded several times by the Greek state. His military equipment and his weapons are displayed at the Macedonian Struggle Museum in Thessaloniki.

== Sources ==
- Κωνσταντίνος Βακαλόπουλος, Ο Μακεδονικός Αγώνας (1904-1908), Η ένοπλη φάση, Thessaloniki, 1987
- Περιφερειακή Εφορεία Προσκόπων Κιλκίς, Ο Προσκοπισμός στο Κιλκίς
- Κοινωνία Πολιτών Ν. Κιλκίς, 27 Οκτωβρίου 2008, Ιωάννης Τσιτσίμης, "Η χαμένη τιμή του καπετάν Μίκη Ζέζα, Στη μνήμη του οπλαρχηγού Β΄, Στρώμνιτσας, Δημήτρη Τσιτσίμη"
