= Grecomans =

Pejorative term for Greek-identifying people

Grecomans or Graecomans (Note: Greek: Γραικομάνοι, romanized: Graikománoi; Bulgarian: Гъркомани, romanized: Gărkomani; Macedonian: Гркомани, romanized: Grkomani; Romanian: Grecomani; Albanian: Grekomanë; Aromanian: Gricumanji) is a pejorative term that generally means "pretending to be a Greek" (implying a non-Greek origin). It is used in Bulgaria, North Macedonia, Romania, and Albania to characterize Albanian-speaking, Aromanian-speaking, and Slavic-speaking people who self-identify as ethnic Greeks. Another meaning of the term is fanatic Greeks.

The "Grecomans" are regarded as ethnic Greeks in Greece, but as members of originally non-Greek, but subsequently Hellenized minorities, in the neighboring countries. The historical controversy surrounding such people stems from the fact that during the rise of nationalism in the Ottoman Empire they used to identify themselves as Romioi, as part of the Rum millet.

== Macedonian Struggle ==
In the region of Macedonia the term appeared during the 19th and early 20th century nationalist propaganda campaigns and the struggle for Macedonia. Two notable Makedonomachoi, who were Slavophone and self-identified as Greeks, were Gonos Yotas and Kottas in Central and Western Macedonia, respectively.

== Aromanian question ==
Greek influence is deeply rooted in the Aromanians. They have always been linked to the Greek Ecumenical Patriarchate of Constantinople, which has bounded their cultural and economic activities with the Greek church. Therefore, wealthy urbanized Aromanians had been active promoters of the Greek language for a long time. In the 17th and 18th centuries, this language was used as a lingua franca in various parts of southeastern Europe, and it was necessary to speak it in order to achieve a higher social status or to receive education. Due to the influential position of Greek, not only several Aromanians but also Albanians, Bulgarians and Macedonian Slavs began to declare themselves as ethnic Greeks. Such was the strength of this influence that the first texts in Aromanian, written in the Greek alphabet, promoted the spread of Greek culture. Many settlements in central Greece were easily Hellenized without the need of political or religious movements.

== Notable people ==
- Gonos Yotas
- Kottas
- Charalambos Boufidis
- Georgios Modis

== See also ==
- Arvanites
- Serbomans
- Bulgarophiles

== Sources ==
- Brown, Keith (2003). The Past in Question: Modern Macedonia and the Uncertainties of Nation. Princeton, New Jersey: Princeton University Press. ISBN 0-691-09995-2.
- Cowan, Jane K. (2000). Macedonia: The Politics of Identity and Difference. Sterling, Virginia: Pluto Press. ISBN 0-7453-1589-5.
- Danforth, Loring M. (1997). The Macedonian Conflict: Ethnic Nationalism in a Transnational World. Princeton, New Jersey: Princeton University Press. ISBN 0-691-04356-6.
- Kahl, Thede (June 2002). "The Ethnicity of Aromanians after 1990: The Identity of a Minority that Behaves like a Majority". Ethnologia Balkanica.
- Kalyvas, Stathis N. (2006). The Logic of Violence in Civil War. Cambridge, United Kingdom: Cambridge University Press. ISBN 0-521-85409-1.
- Karakasidou, Anastasia N. (1997). Fields of Wheat, Hills of Blood: Passages to Nationhood in Greek Macedonia, 1870-1990. Chicago, Illinois: University of Chicago Press. ISBN 0-226-42494-4.
- Kontogiorgi, Elisabeth (2006). Population Exchange in Greek Macedonia: The Rural Settlement of Refugees 1922-1930. Oxford, United Kingdom: Clarendon Press. ISBN 0-19-927896-2.
- Mackridge, Peter; Yannakakis, Eleni (1997). Ourselves and Others: The Development of a Greek Macedonian Cultural Identity since 1912. Oxford, United Kingdom: Berg Publishers. ISBN 1-85973-138-4.
- Nugent, David (2002). Locating Capitalism in Time and Space: Global Restructurings, Politics, and Identity. Stanford, California: Stanford University Press. ISBN 0-8047-4238-3.
- Rossos, Andrew (2008). Macedonia and the Macedonians: A History. Stanford, California: Hoover Press (Stanford University). ISBN 978-0-8179-4882-5.
- Skendi, Stavro (1967). The Albanian National Awakening, 1878-1912. Princeton, New Jersey: Princeton University Press.
- Van Boeschoten, Riki (2006). "Code-switching, Linguistic Jokes and Ethnic Identity: Reading Hidden Transcripts in a Cross-cultural Context". Journal of Modern Greek Studies. 24. Johns Hopkins University Press: 347–377. doi:10.1353/mgs.2006.0018.
