= Slavic speakers in Ottoman Macedonia =

Ethnolinguistic group in Ottoman Macedonia

Slavic speakers
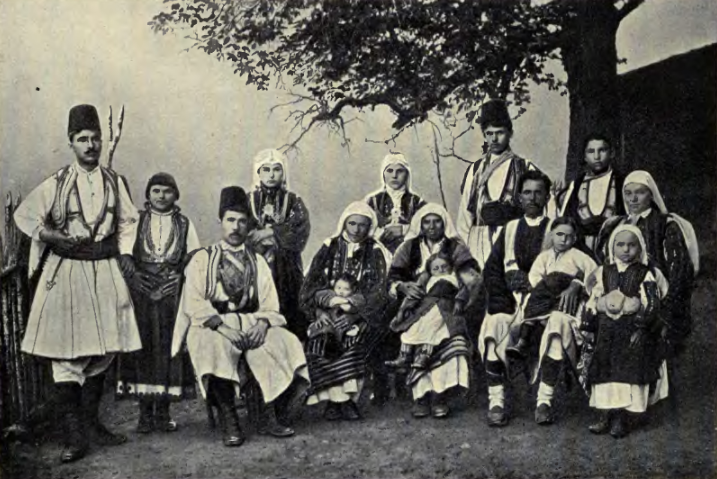
- Macedonian peasants (c. 1905).

Regions with significant populations
- Macedonia (Ottoman Empire)

Languages
- Eastern South Slavic dialects

Religion
- Orthodox Christianity · Ecumenical Patriarchate of Constantinople · Bulgarian Exarchate (after 1872)

Related ethnic groups
- Bulgarians, Greeks, Macedonians, Serbs

Slavic-speakers inhabiting the Ottoman-ruled region of Macedonia had settled in the area since the Slavic migrations during the Middle Ages and formed a distinct ethnolinguistic group. While Greek was spoken in the urban centers and in a coastal zone in the south of the region, Slav-speakers were abundant in its rural hinterland and were predominantly occupied in agriculture. Before the rise of nationalism in the Ottoman Empire they were habitually known and identifying as "Bulgarian" on account of their native language and they were members of the Rum Millet (the community of Orthodox Christians).

After the emergence of rival national movements among Balkan Christians, the allegiance of Macedonian Slavs became the apple of discord for nationalists vying for dominion over the region of Macedonia. Parties with national affiliations, mostly Greek and Bulgarian, were formed in their midst, largely expressing and accentuating pre-existing social cleavages. From the 1870s onwards Bulgarian, Greek and Serbian propaganda appealed to them via the creation and operation of national education networks, while supporting the structures of the Bulgarian Exarchate or the Patriarchate of Constantinople came to prove allegiance to the Bulgarian or Greek cause respectively. Attempting to instill the "proper" national sense in Macedonian Slavs, and validate the territorial claims over Macedonia in that way. Amidst worsening economic and political conditions for Slav peasants, the clandestine Internal Macedonian Revolutionary Organization, founded in 1893, gained a wide following with a program of agrarian reform imposed by terror, culminating in the staging of the Ilinden uprising of 1903, which was swiftly suppressed by the Ottomans. An armed clash ensued within Slav communities resistant to national proselytization, with IMRO komitadjis fighting against Ottoman authorities and bands of Greek Makedonomachoi and Serbian nationalists until the pacification imposed after the Young Turk Revolution in 1908. At that time the international observers viewed the majority of them as Bulgarian.

Following the partition of the Ottoman lands of the region of Macedonia between Balkan nation-states after the conclusion of the Balkan Wars in 1913, many Slavic-speaking inhabitants of the regions annexed by Greece and the Kingdom of Serbia emigrated to Pirin Macedonia and other parts of Bulgaria.

== Language, economy, and society ==
In the region of Macedonia, Greek-speakers were concentrated in a littoral zone, covering the southern parts of contemporary Greek Macedonia, southwards of the cities of Kastoria, Edessa, and Serres. To the north of this imaginary line, Greek was spoken regularly in the cities, while in the countryside most Christians were Slav-speakers. From the mid-eighteenth till the mid-nineteenth century Greek-, Aromanian- and Albanian-speakers migrated under Albanian pressure from Epirus to Macedonia, forming new villages or settling in Slav-speaking existing ones, and were linguistically assimilated in most cases. Slavic-speakers, predominating in the rural parts of the region, laboured in Turkish chifliks in the plains or inhabited free mountainous villages and worked as itinerant specialized craftsmen, e.g. builders, across the Balkan Peninsula. Only a few populated the region's urban centers, until the growing stream of migration from the countryside to the cities over the nineteenth century. As happened in the case of Aromanians, Slavs migrants to the cities usually adopted Greek culture and were married into other groups of Orthodox Christians.

At the beginning of the nineteenth century, Slav peasants identified themselves based on belonging to their family, village, or local region or as "Rum", i.e. members of the Rum millet, the Greek-dominated politico-religious community of Orthodox Christians. The Slavs of Macedonia generally referred to themselves and were known as "Bulgarians". In the times of late modern period, before the rise of nationalism, the word "Bulgar" invoked the idea of a poor, Slav-speaking peasant, the stereotypical negative image of the labourers of lowland chiftliks as dull and uncivilized. As it described their actual socio-economic status, the term "Bulgar" could be used as a term of identification in tandem with "Rum", which denoted membership in the community of Orthodox Christians and implied the aspiration of elevation to the higher social status of cultured Hellenized urbanites.

By the early years of the nineteenth century, peasant communities of Macedonia experienced the formation of deep divisions between various social and professional groups over the appointment of community leaders and the allocation of natural resources. Per Apostolos Vacalopoulos, Evliya Çelebi and Hadji Kalfa were the last foreign travellers to mention during the 17th century Serbs in the area. From the beginning of the 18th century, there is mention only of Bulgarians, which reveals they formed the largest Slavic community and gradually absorbed the sparse Serbian villagers in the area. As a result, after the rise of nationalism during the 19th century, the Slavic-speakers in Macedonia, already Bulgarian by name, began to acquire mainly Bulgarian national identity.

== National antagonisms ==
During the Greek War of Independence the insurrection of Naousa in 1822, led by local notables and warlords like Angelis Gatsos, was joined by ca 2,000 Greek- and Slav-speakers from the surrounding villages. A considerable number of Slavs from Macedonia, amounting to a few hundreds, continued fighting, imbued with religious sentiment, in southern Greece as professional soldiers and settled in the independent kingdom of Greece, where they were given land. Their descendants were called "Bulgarians" or "Thracian-Macedonians," and were considered Bulgarian-speaking Orthodox Christian co-nationals on a par with Greek-speaking Greeks, as they perceived themselves.

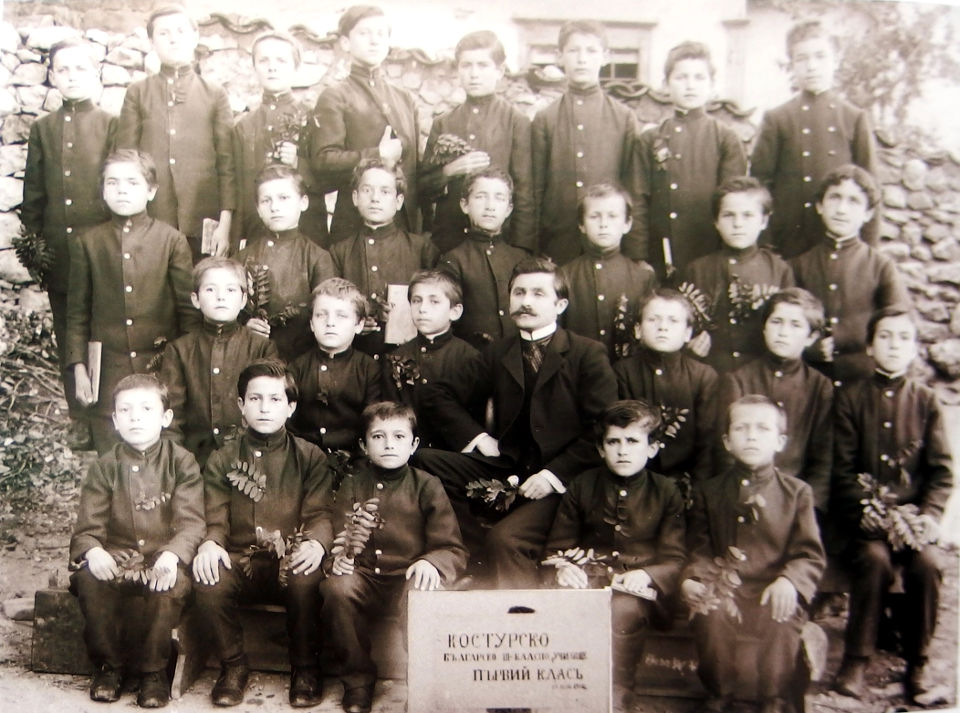
Pupils of the Bulgarian school of Kostur/Kastoria

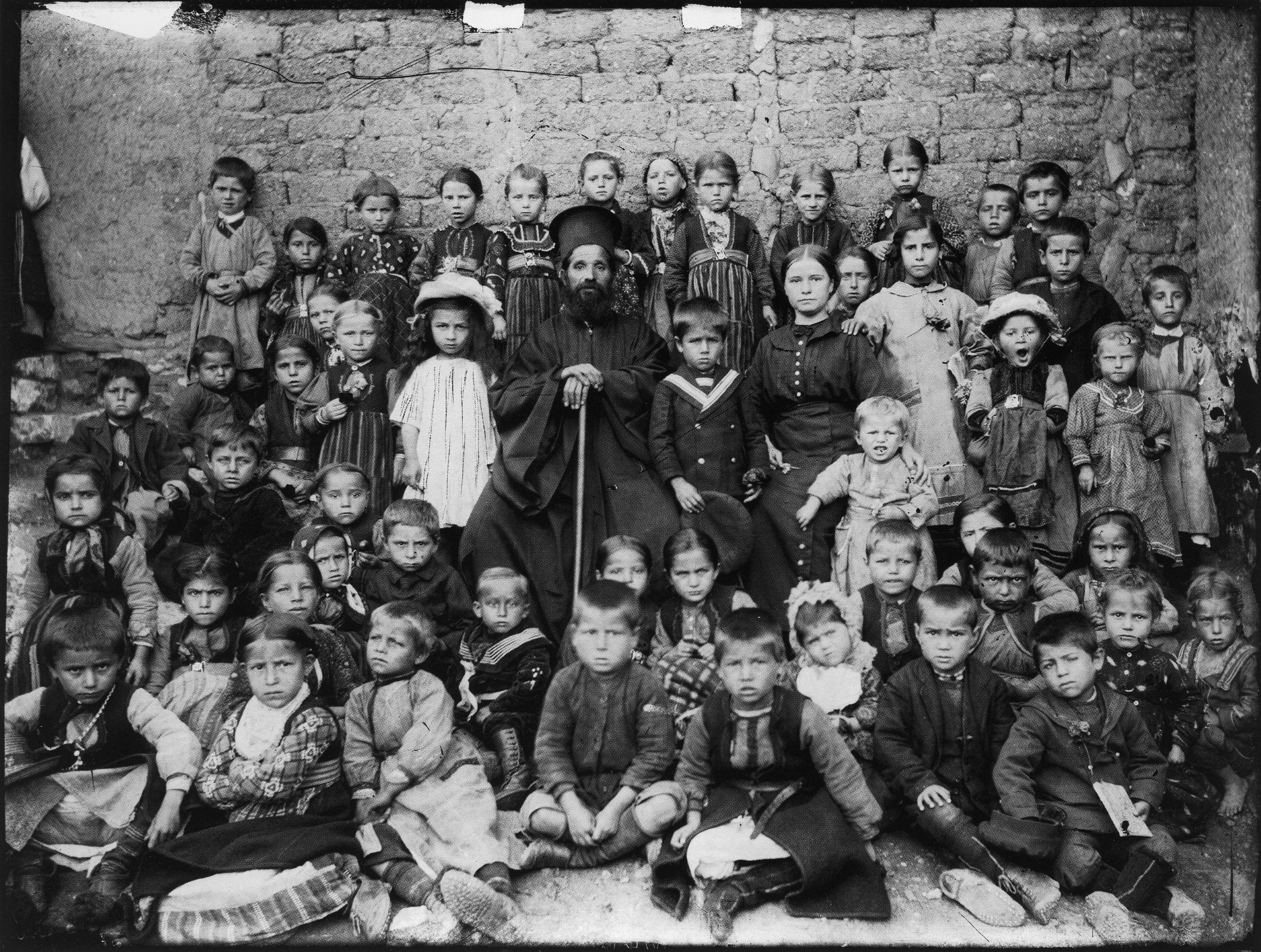
Pupils of the Greek school of Zoupanishta (today Lefki, Kastoria).

The 1870 firman establishing the Bulgarian Exarchate allowed for a diocese to join the Exarchate, given the support of 2/3 of its flock. Ecclesiastical allegiance was treated as a declaration of one's national identity. For Slav peasants, however, the choice between the Patriarchate's Rum millet and the Exarchate's Bulgarian millet was not tainted with national meaning, but was a choice of Church or millet. Thus, adherence to the Bulgarian national cause was going against notions of the sanctity of the Greek language, but was attractive as a means of opposing oppressive Christian chiflik owners and urban merchants, who usually identified with the Greek nation, as a way to escape arbitrary taxation by Patriarchate bishops, via shifting allegiance to the Exarchate and on account of the free (and, occasionally, even subsidized) provision of education in Bulgarian schools. The Exarchist movement met with less success in Macedonia than in eastern Bulgarian lands, due to the social and cultural dominance of the Greek bourgeoisie. In the middle of the century, despite the opposition of Greek bishops, many Slav villages adopted the use of Bulgarian in education and liturgical life.

From 1870 until 1913 the national affiliation of the Orthodox Slavs of Macedonia became the locus of a contest between Greece and Bulgaria, who intensified their national educational activity in the region of Macedonia, alongside Serbia. Rival Serb, Greek and Bulgarian nationalism used religious and educational institutions to tie Macedonia's population to their respective national cause by implanting the "proper" national sense in them, thus validating the territorial claims over Macedonia. While Greeks claimed the Slavs of Macedonia as their Orthodox brethren, Serbs and Bulgarians considered them members of their nation on account of their language. Maps and statistics produced mostly reflected their creators' intentions than the demographic reality on the ground and were characterized by enormous anomalies, while Ottoman censuses classified their subjects using their religious affiliation further perplexed the issue of their national identity. In the 1870s, Serbs directed their attentions to Macedonia, due to their interest in the area of Kosovo and after the frustration of hopes of acquiring Bosnia-Herzegovina, once it was occupied by Austria-Hungary in 1878. Serbian intellectuals denied the Bulgarian identity of Macedonian Slavs, based on the differences between eastern and western Bulgarian dialects, and suggested they should be incorporated in Serbia. The Greek party initially relied on the traditional appeal of belonging to the Rum millet and the authority of its prelates, on Greek cultural and educational hegemony, and on cooperation with Ottoman authorities. Bulgarian nationalists had taken a lead, and as traditional means of exertion of influence by Greek nationalists proved insufficient, the Greek efforts after 1878 were directed to the middle and southern parts of Macedonia, investing in the opening of Greek schools and subsidizing education in Greece, while from 1882 Greece opened consulates that operated as centers of Greek national propaganda.

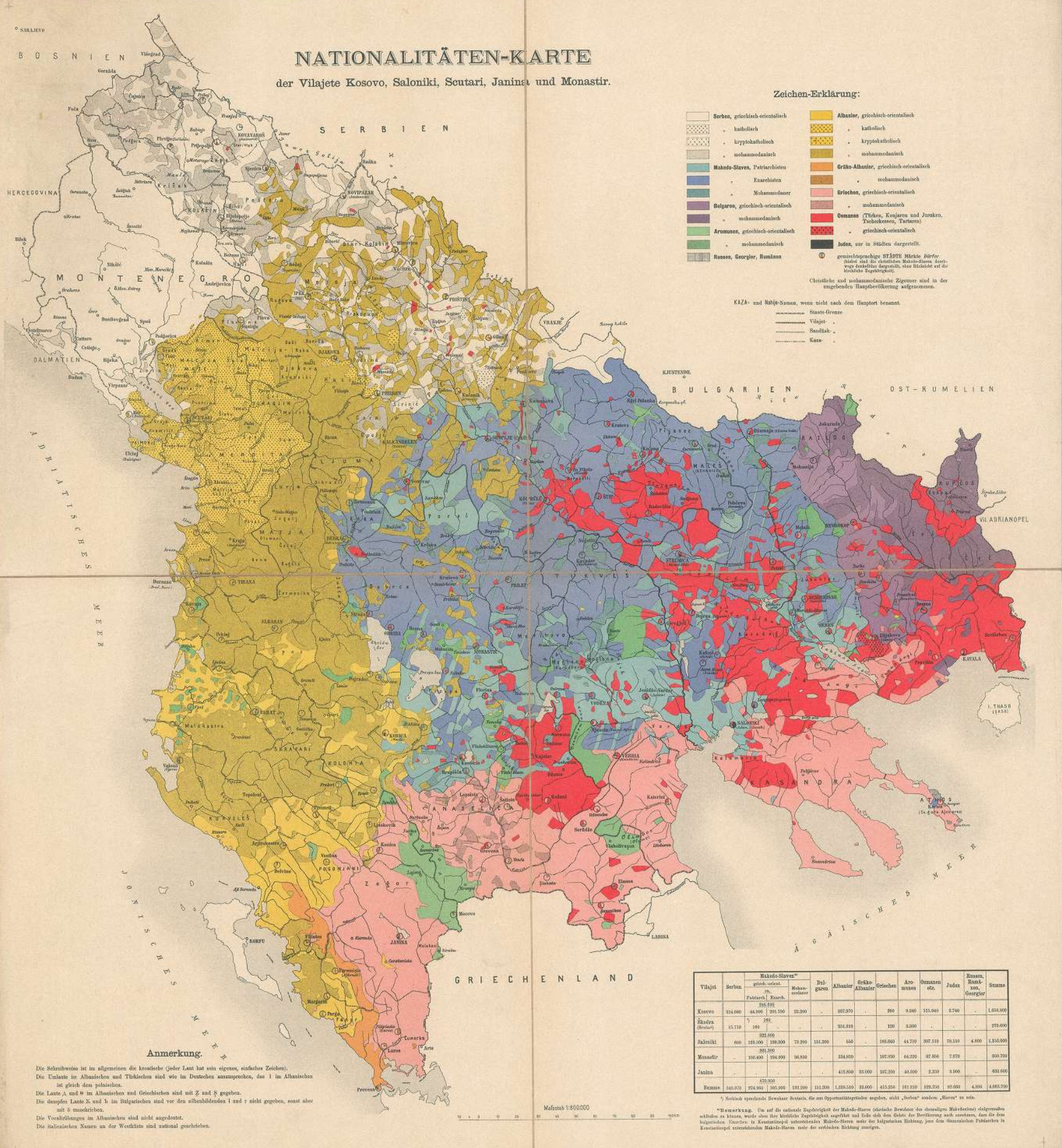
Ethnographic map of the vilayets of Kosovo, Saloniki, Scutari, Janina and Monastir, showing the religious affiliations (Patriarchist, Exarchist and Muslim) of Macedonian Slavs ca. 1900. These, in the eastern most region of Macedonia, are marked as Bulgarians.

While schoolteachers, priests, and government officials readily espoused national causes, that was not the case with the vast majority of Slav peasants. Alignment of the Slavs of Macedonia with the Bulgarian, the Greek or sometimes the Serbian national camp did not imply adherence to different national ideologies: these camps were not stable, culturally distinct groups, but parties with national affiliations, described by contemporaries as "sides", "wings", "parties" or "political clubs". It was common for same families to have members affiliated to different "nationalities", an individual could pass through multiple religio-national orienation. Despite the emergence and propagation of national ideologies, the worldview of most Slav peasants in Macedonia was marked by pre-national concerns, and characterized by the fundamental rift between Christian subjects and Muslim overlords. Furthermore, in some cases national identity was forcibly imposed to them and they would turn to it when they were forced by the nationalist educational and religious propaganda and the revolutionary terror campaigns.

== Armed confrontation (1893–1908) ==
Towards the end of the nineteenth century living conditions of labourers in the chiftliks deteriorated, after their Turkish owners became indebted to Greek and Jewish merchants and sold their estates, while economic divisions in the free villages deepened between poor small landholders and the wealthier notables, known as "çorbacı", who usually allied with Turkish authorities and the Greek bishop and sided with the Greek party. Economic misery and political friction led many peasants to emigration to the New World or to neighbouring countries, especially Bulgaria, whence they returned proselytised to the national cause.

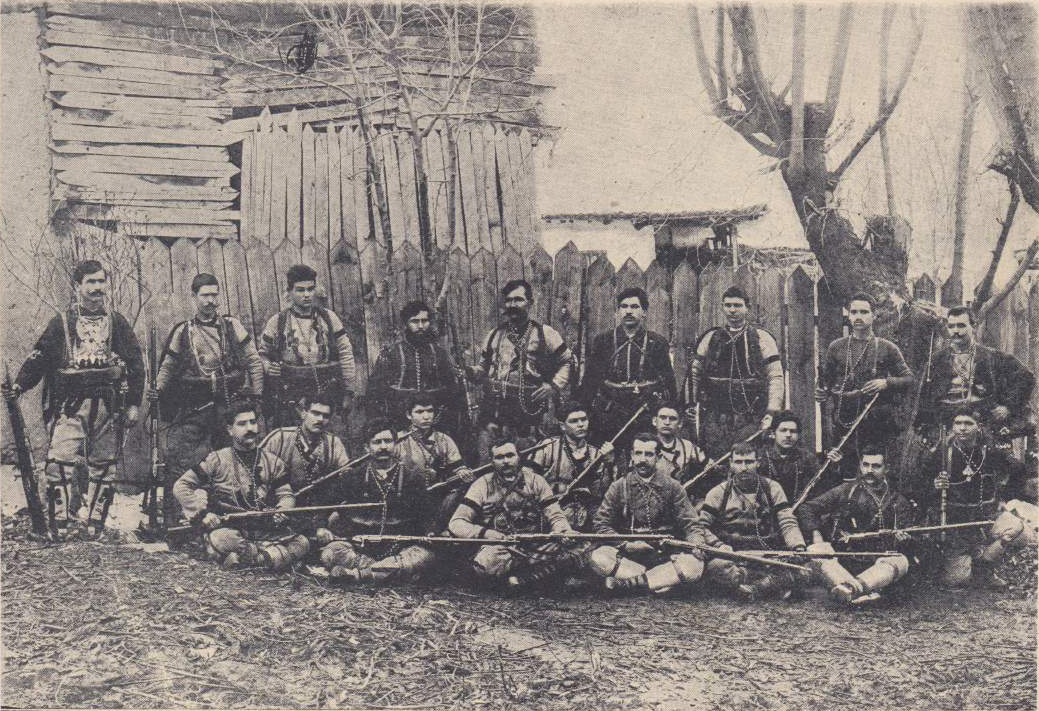
The band of IMRO komitadji of Yenitsa, led by the Bulgarian voivoda Apostol Petkov.

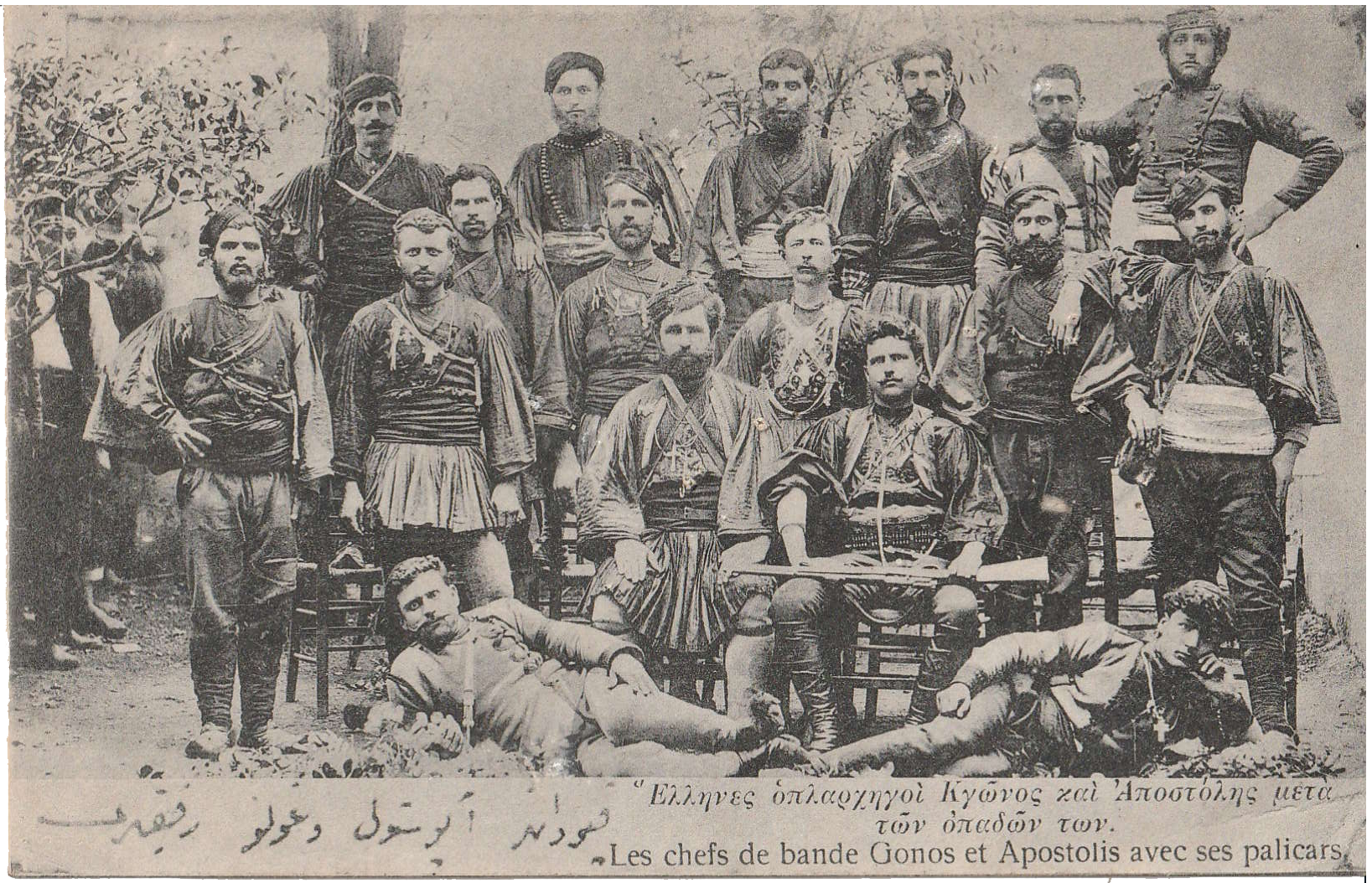
Komitadji-turned-Makedonomachos Gonos Yotas, first cousin of Petkov. He was former activist of the pro-Bulgarian IMRO.

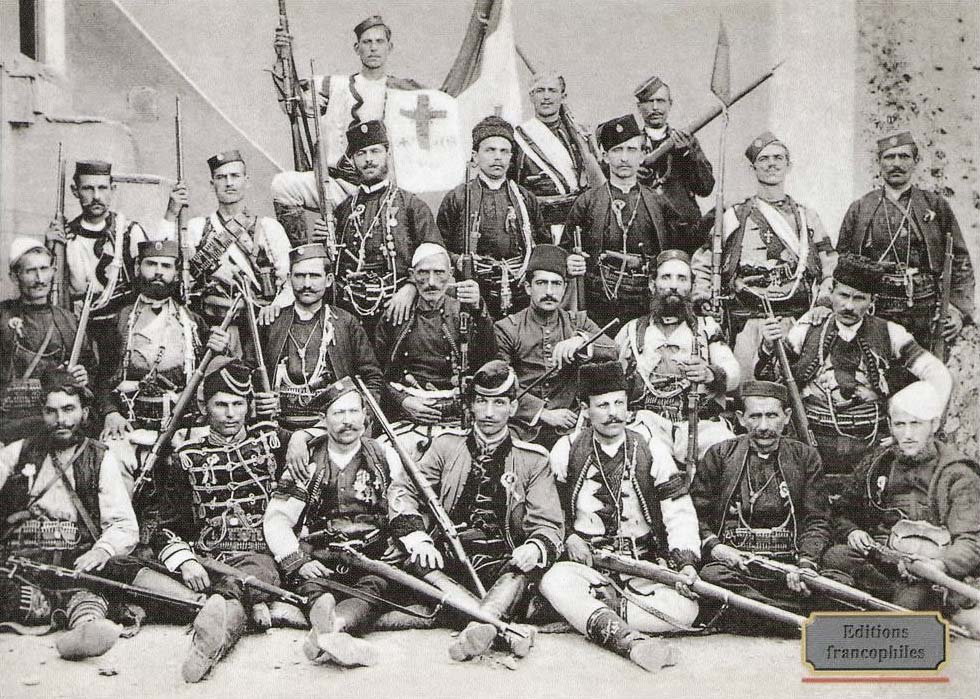
Komitadji-turned-Serbian vojvode Gligor Sokolovic with Chetniks during Macedonian Struggle. He was former activist of the pro-Bulgarian SMAC and IMRO.

As prospects of social mobility cultivated by the expanded provision of education were frustrated, a number of teachers and urban professions influenced by socialist ideas formed in 1893 in Salonica a secret revolutionary organization aiming to gain political autonomy for the region of Macedonia. After some name changes, it became known as the "Internal Macedonian Revolutionary Organization", and oriented its energies towards engaging traditional brigands and peasants in building a network of parallel institutions in Slav Macedonian villages, facing Ottoman repression and employing means of terror to cement its base. IMRO gained a mass following of peasants who attached themselves to its cause for social reasons, reaping short-term benefits by upper social strata, thanks to threat of violence by armed IMRO bands, and enchanted by the long-term promise of social reform, in particular radical agrarian reform. Having gained a stronghold in the area, the IMRO staged an anti-Ottoman rebellion, centered around the wealthy free villages of Western Macedonia, on 20 July (O.S.) 1903. The rebellion was brutally suppressed by the Ottomans; tens of villages, mostly in the Manastir Vilayet, were razed to the ground and thousands of uninvolved peasants sought refuge to the mountains.

Following the failed Ilinden Uprising the IMRO ultimately weakened due to a split into pro-Bulgarian nationalist right-wing faction and a left-wing faction who favored an autonomous Macedonia as part of a Balkan Federation. Moreover, following the Murzsteg Agreement, article 3 of which stipulated the administrative reorganization with a view to a better grouping of different nationalities, the governments of both Greece and Bulgaria began to organize missions of armed nationalist guerrilla bands to Macedonia, composed mostly of Cretans in the Greek case. Serbia offered material support to the Ilinden Uprising, and after its suppression, authorities in Belgrade sought but failed to negotiate with Bulgarian leaders on sending Serbian bands into Macedonia for combined action. A Serbian Committee also had funded small groups of chetniks, either self-organized or part of the Bulgarian revolutionary organizations active in Macedonia (IMRO and SMAC) in spring of 1904. Soon, hostility between the Bulgarian organizations and the Serbian Chetnik Organization began. With the failed idea of joint actions, and growing nationalism, the government in Belgrade took over the activities of the organization. Most Greek-speaking villages remained uninvolved in the Macedonian Struggle, which developed as a confrontation between opposing national factions mostly within the Christian Slav-speaking communities of Macedonia, leading contemporary observers to describe it as a "civil war among Christians". Amongst the primary aims of the guerrilla war was to force the Macedonian Slavs to declare themselves Greeks, Bulgarians or Serbs, this was difficult because the peasantry stubbornly refused to identify with these national causes. However, the warfare forced the peasantry to affiliate with some of the state-sponsored national identities, this decision was significantly influenced by violent threats and opportunity. Under the pressure of armed nationalist bands, individuals and entire communities in the Slavic-speaking parts of Macedonia were obliged to repeatedly shift their stated national affiliation. The infighting tore apart these communities, as IMRO komitadjis and rival members of Greek bands were connected with social or even family ties. Rejecting such criteria as language or race, the Greek view appealed to the "national consciousness" of non-Greeks. In practice, this translated to the Slav peasant's confessional affiliation to the Greek-Orthodox millet. Facing a population largely indifferent to national ideas, the employment of violent means by Greek guerrillas in a manner equally relentless to that of the IMRO bands managed to restrict IMRO terrorist activities. The Young Turk Revolution in 1908 imposed a temporary stop to all guerrilla actions in Macedonia.

== Second Constitutional Era (1908–1912) ==
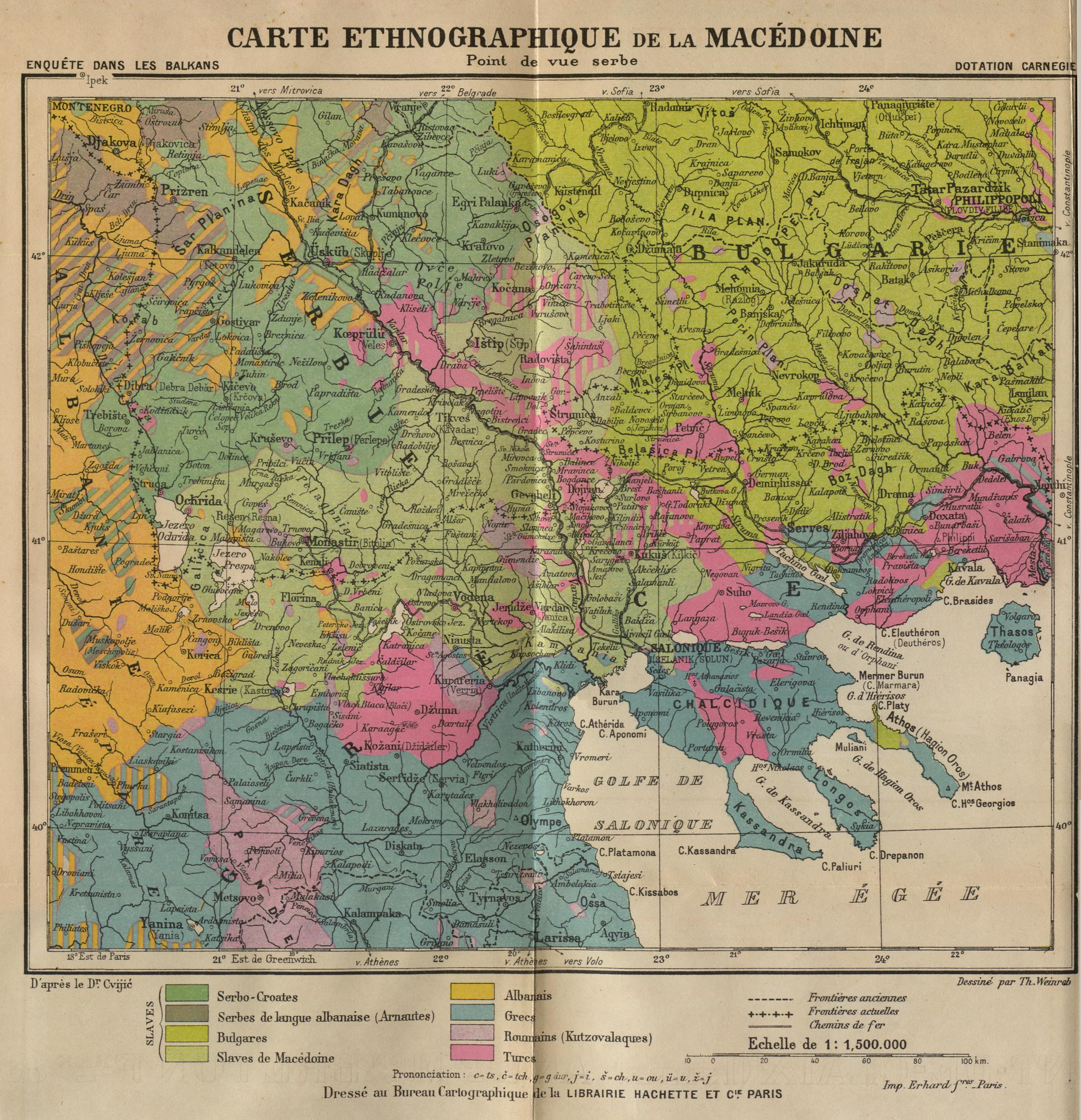
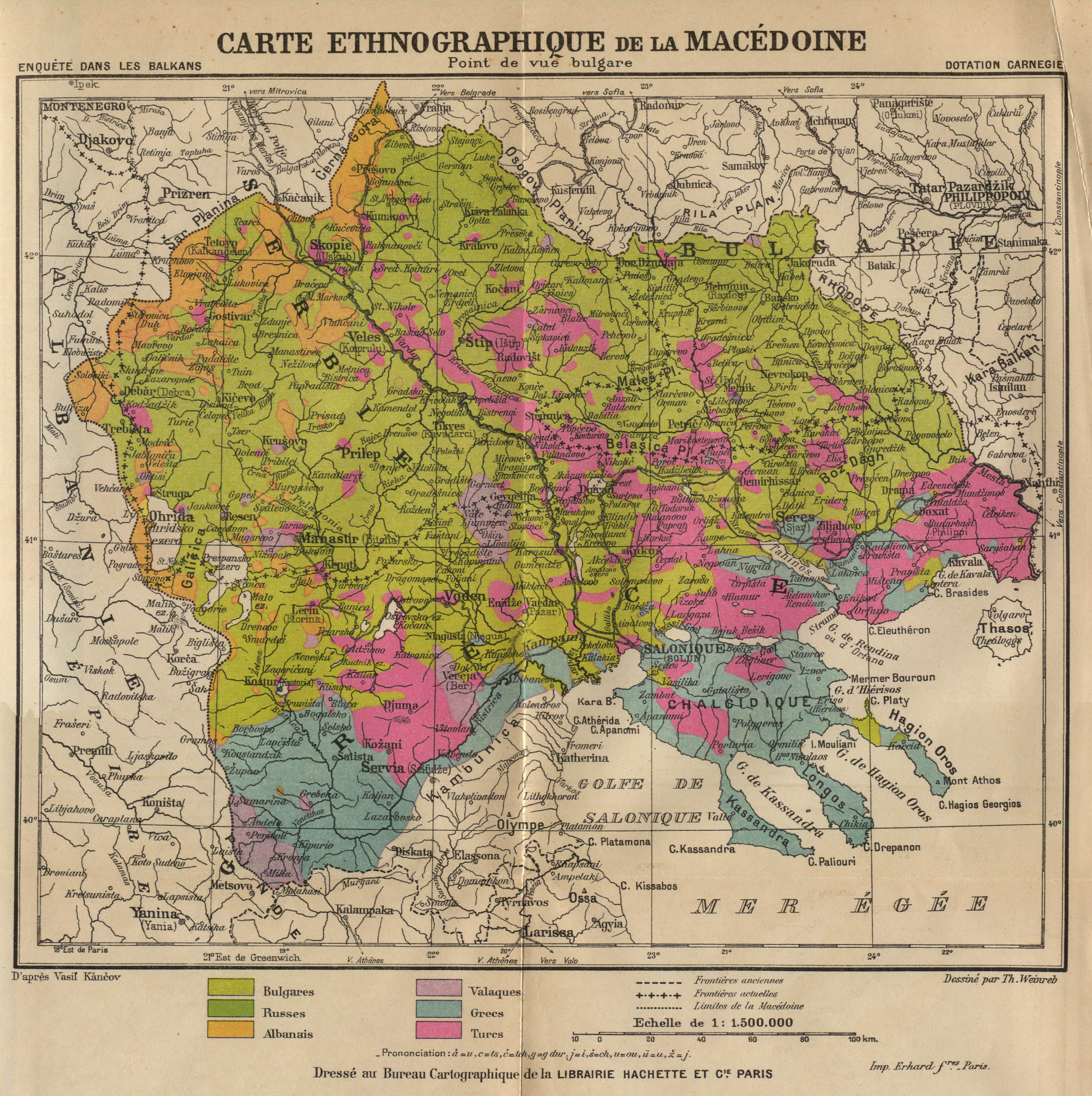
Serbian (left) and Bulgarian (right) ethnolinguistic maps of the region of Macedonia in 1914; Slavic speakers in variations of green

The Second Constitutional Era established shortly after the 1908 Young Turk Revolution led to the restoration of the constitution of 1876. After the Revolution armed factions laid down their arms and joined the legal struggle. The Bulgarian community founded the Peoples' Federative Party (Bulgarian Section) and the Union of the Bulgarian Constitutional Clubs and participated in Ottoman elections. Some prominent Ottoman Greeks and Serbs also served as Ottoman Parliamentary Deputies. Soon the Turkish nationalism came to grow, and the Young Turks sought to suppress the national aspirations of the various minorities in the Empire. During the Balkan Wars of 1912–13, the Ottoman Empire lost most of its European territories inhabited by Christian minorities.

According to Encyclopædia Britannica 1911 Edition, at the beginning of the 20th century the Slavs constituted the majority of the population of Macedonia. There were 1,300,000 Orthodox Christians, 800,000 Muslims and 75,000 Jews, by a total population of ca. 2,200,000 people. The Slavs were 1,150,000, of which 1,000,000 were Orthodox. Although the affiliation to the Bulgarian community was the most common, only the small social class of educated Slavs developed some national identity, and most probably felt themselves to be Bulgarians. As a whole the international observers viewed the majority of them as some kind Bulgarian. However, more astute observers who visited Macedonia at the time concluded that based on their language the Macedonian Slavs were neither Bulgarians nor Serbs.

== Integration in nation-states ==
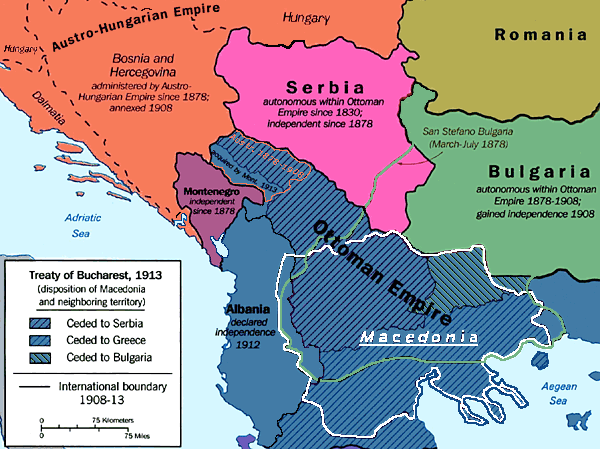
The partition of the lands of Ottoman-ruled Macedonia among the nation-states of the Balkan League in 1913

The partition of the Ottoman lands of the region of Macedonia between Balkan nation-states after the conclusion of the Balkan Wars (1912–1913) and World War I (1914–1918) left the area, divided mainly between Greece and Serbia (later Yugoslavia), while the smallest portion was acquired by Bulgaria. Others remained as a Slavic-speaking linguistic minority in Greek Macedonia. On the other hand, those in Vardar Macedonia were ceded to the Kingdom of Serbia. All of the countries pursued a policy of trying to assimilate the inherited population. Many became a subject of a process of forced Serbianisation in Serbia (later Kingdom of Yugoslavia), and forced Hellenisation and expulsions in Greece. Following the partition an immediate anti-Bulgarian campaign began in the areas under Serbian and Greek control. The Serbians expelled Exarchist churchmen and teachers and closed Bulgarian schools and churches. As a result thousands of Macedonians of Serbian Macedonia were forced to emigrate to Bulgarian Macedonia. They joined an even larger number that were leaving devastated Greek Macedonia, where the Greeks burned down Kilkis, which was the center of the Bulgarian culture, as well as parts of Serres and Drama. Bulgarian literary language, incl. the Macedonian dialects, was prohibited.

During the Paris Peace Conference of 1919, the Allies sanctioned Serbian control of Vardar Macedonia and accepted the belief that Macedonian Slavs there were in fact "Southern Serbs". The locals faced with the policy of forced serbianisation. Serbian authorities persecuted Bulgarian priests and teachers, forcing them to flee and replacing them by Serbian. Persons declaring Bulgarian identity were imprisoned or went into exile. In 1924 upon the League of Nations' demand, a bilateral Bulgarian-Greek agreement was signed, known as the Politis–Kalfov Protocol, recognizing the "Greek Slavophones" as Bulgarians and guaranteeing their protection. On February 2, 1925, the Greek parliament, claiming pressure from the Kingdom of Yugoslavia, which threatened to renounce the treaty about the Greek–Serbian Alliance of 1913, refused to ratify the agreement, that lasted until June 10, 1925. In 1927 the Mollov–Kafantaris population exchange agreement was signed and the bulk of the Slavic-speaking population in Greece was forced to leave for Bulgaria, and the Greeks of Bulgaria to Greece. Later the Greek governments began promulgating a policy of persecution of the use of Slavic dialects both in public and in private, as well of expressions of any cultural or ethnic distinctiveness.

During the interbellum the foreign observers proceeded with describing the Macedonian Slavs as a nationally oblivious peasantry. Although in Vardar Macedonia a separate Macedonian consciousness was growing. In this part of Macedonia during World War II the communist Macedonian Partisans movement towards the end of what they called the National Liberation Struggle established the Socialist Republic of Macedonia as part of SFR Yugoslavia.

== See also ==
- Macedonian Bulgarians
- Macedonian nationalism
- Ethnic Macedonians
- Grecomans
