= Rosa Plaveva =

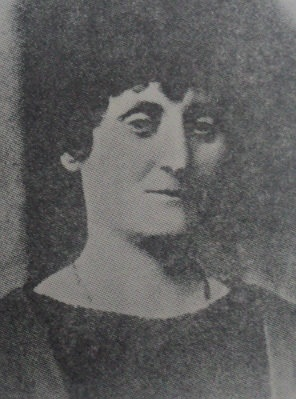
- Plaveva in the beginning of 1920s
- Born: 1878; Köprülü, Ottoman Empire (now Veles, North Macedonia)
- Died: 1970 (aged 91); Belgrade, Yugoslavia
- Occupations: Socialist and suffragette
- Spouse: Ilija Plavev

Rosa Plaveva, née Varnalieva (1878 – 1970), was an Ottoman and Yugoslav socialist and suffragette.

== Life ==
Rosa Plaveva was born in the town of Köprülü, then in the Ottoman Empire, (now Veles, North Macedonia) to a wealthy family in 1878.She studied in his hometown and then in Sofia. There she encountered the socialist movement for the first time. She attended a vocational school and became a seamstress. She married Ilija Plavev about 1903 and they had a son and a daughter together. Plaveva died in Belgrade, Yugoslavia, in 1970.

== Activities ==
In 1900 she joined the Macedonian-Adrianople Social Democratic Group, a branch of the Bulgarian Workers' Social Democratic Party established by Vasil Glavinov in Sofia, Bulgaria. She organized meetings in her house in 1909, after the Young Turk Revolution of 1908 liberalized the government, advocating possible campaigns for women's rights. Influenced by the Ilinden–Preobrazhenie Uprising of 1903, she was also an advocate for Macedonian independence. With her husband, Plaveva founded the Social-Democratic Organization in Skopje on 1 May 1909, in close link with the People's Federative Party (Bulgarian Section). Unhappy with the civil law of Serbia which annexed Vardar Macedonia after World War I, that treated adult women as minor children, Plaveva helped to found the Organization of Socialist Women in Skopje in 1920, that advocated for women's equality. She was one of the founders of the Socialist Workers' Party of Yugoslavia (Communists) in 1919.

== See also ==
- Women's Antifascist Front of Macedonia

== Bibliography ==
- Vesković-Vangeli, Vera (2005). "Plaveva, Rosa (born Varnalieva)". In Haan, Francisca de; Daskalova, Krassimira; Loutfi, Anna (eds.). Biographical Dictionary of Women's Movements and Feminisms in Central, Eastern, and South Eastern Europe: 19th and 20th Centuries. New York: Central European University Press. ISBN 978-963-7326-39-4.
