= Atanas Razdolov =

Socialist and writer (1872–1903)

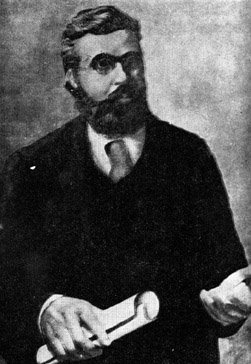
Portrait of Razdolov ca. 1920.

Atanas Ivanov Razdolov (Macedonian and Bulgarian: Атанас Иванов Раздолов; 1872–1931) was a socialist and anarchist revolutionary and writer from the region of Macedonia.

== Life ==
Born in Berovo, Ottoman Empire (present-day North Macedonia), as a young man, he left his hometown and settled in Kyustendil, Bulgaria. There he graduated from the Pedagogical School in 1895. He joined the Macedonian-Adrianople Social Democratic Group during this time. He later became a member of the Kyustendil Macedonian Society which was involved in the activity of the Supreme Macedonian-Adrianople Committee. In 1900, He moved to Bulgarian capital Sofia. In 1901, Atanas Razdolov, in an open letter to the chairman of the Supreme Committee, Boris Sarafov, criticized Prince Ferdinand I, and the committee's dependence on Bulgarian authorities. Razdolov believed that the Supreme Committee should work not for unification of Bulgaria and Macedonia but for Macedonian independence. As a result he was arrested. Disappointed with the activities of the Committee, he became radicalized and enrolled in the leftist Bulgarian Workers' Social Democratic Party. After General Ivan Tsonchev took control over the Supreme Committee, he joined the extreme left faction of the Internal Macedonian Revolutionary Organization. He worked alongside Gotse Delchev, who considered Razdolov's writings as part of the organization's propaganda. Atanas Razdolov participated in the Balkan Wars in the Macedonian-Adrianopolitan Volunteer Corps of the Bulgarian Army. He was enrolled in the 2nd Brigade of the Seventh Kumanovo Regiment. Razdolov is the author of books and brochures in Bulgarian language.

Destitute and addicted to alcohol, he died by suicide in Sofia in 1931.

== Views ==
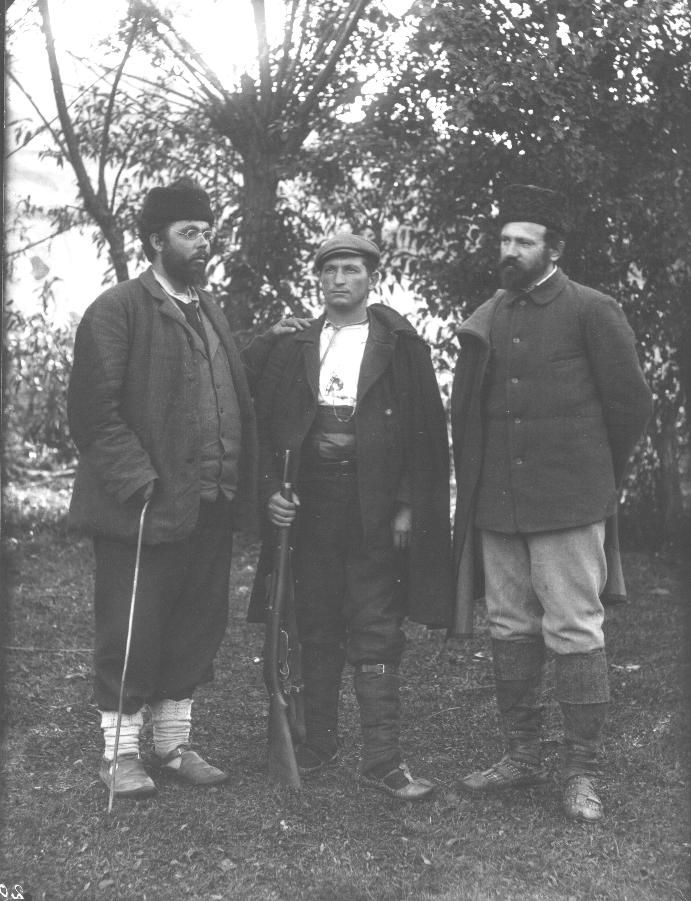
Sotir Atanasov (middle) and Atanas Razdolov (right).

Razdolov's writings supported Macedonian separatism and liberation, being among the first in Bulgaria to publish such opinions publicly. He expressed positions that were pro-Socialist and pro-Macedonian independence. Razdolov authored 97 poems, which were published in twelve books and six short stories. He published his first book, Poems of the Apostles, in 1895 and in it, encouraged Macedonians to fight for Macedonia's freedom. In one of his poems dedicated to Ilyo Maleshevski, he named him as a great Macedonian hero. In 1896, he published another book titled "Unhappy Macedonia" and one of the more notable songs was called "To the Macedonians". Razdolov had anarchist views. He supported an armed struggle to achieve liberation of Macedonia from the Ottoman Empire and fending off any encroachments from neighboring countries. In 1914 after the Balkan Wars, Razdolov published his book "The future of the Balkan Peninsula" which emphasized that all roads led to the autonomy of Macedonia, to the triumph of the motto "Macedonia for the Macedonians", for everyone to have equal rights as a citizen and live a free life, the way he was born, and not the Serb to forcefully make him Serb, the Greek to make him Greek, the Bulgarian to make him Bulgarian, and the Vlach to make him Vlach.

According to some of his contemporaries in Bulgaria, Razdolov was a controversial person. Mihail Dumbalakov claimed he was a famous person, but insane cynic. Per Evtim Sprostranov, Razdolov was a half-mad and drunkard who was engaged in financial blackmail. Petar Karchev wrote about Razdolov that a poetry could not be sought in his poems, however there was hidden the deep bitterness of an honest but failed revolutionary. The patriarch of Bulgarian literature, Ivan Vazov, met him during a scandal in public transport in Sofia. Razdolov travelled without a ticket and Vazov paid for it for him, while Razdolov curiously offered to sell him the copyright of his unpublished book. Per Dimo Kazasov, he was an undistinguished and poorly dressed man who made a living by writing illiterate and thoughtless patriotic poems. According to assessments of his personality from Bulgarian historians, he was a Bulgarian revolutionary who later switched to far left-wing political positions and accepted the ideas of Macedonism after the Balkan Wars.

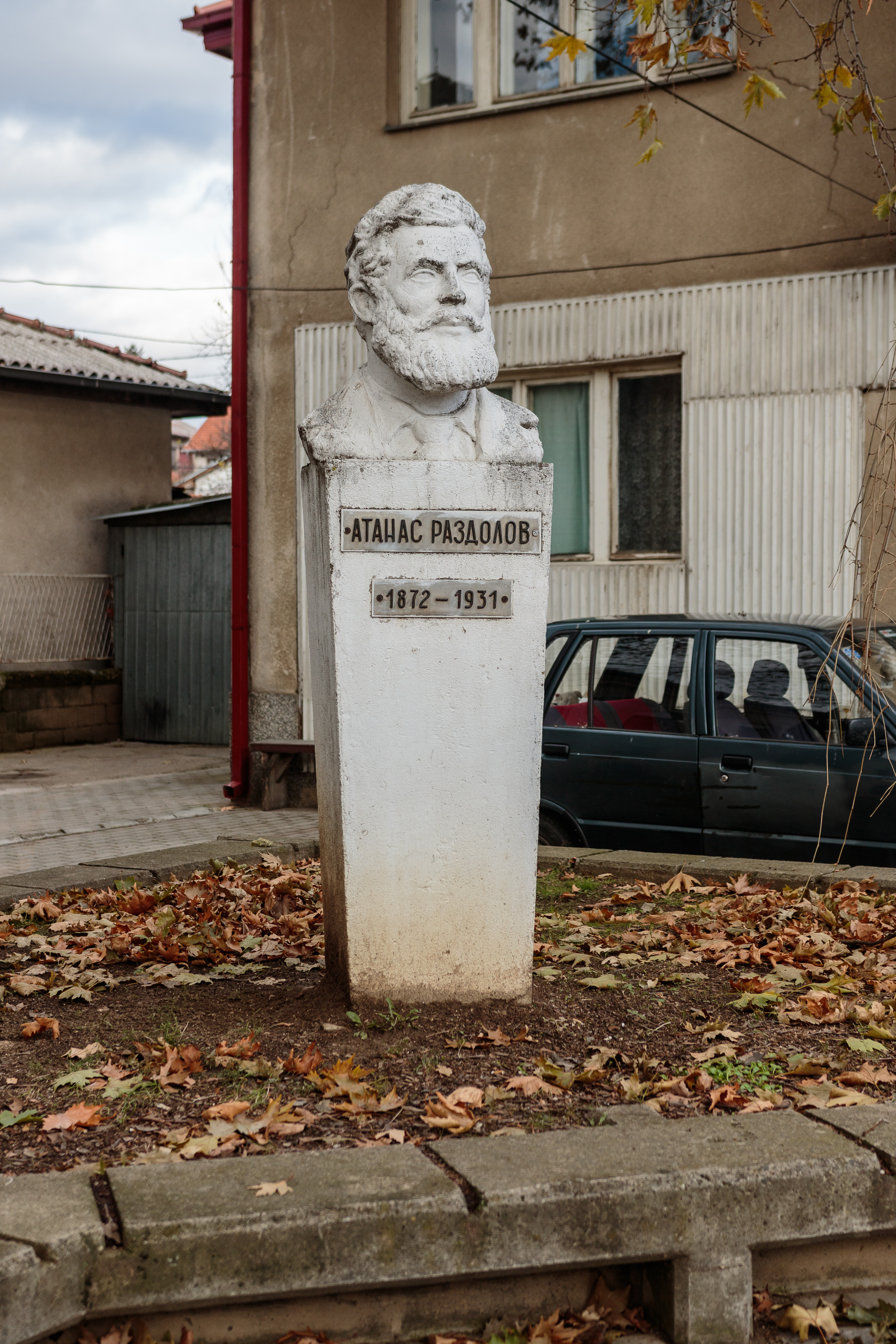
Bust of Razdolov in Berovo

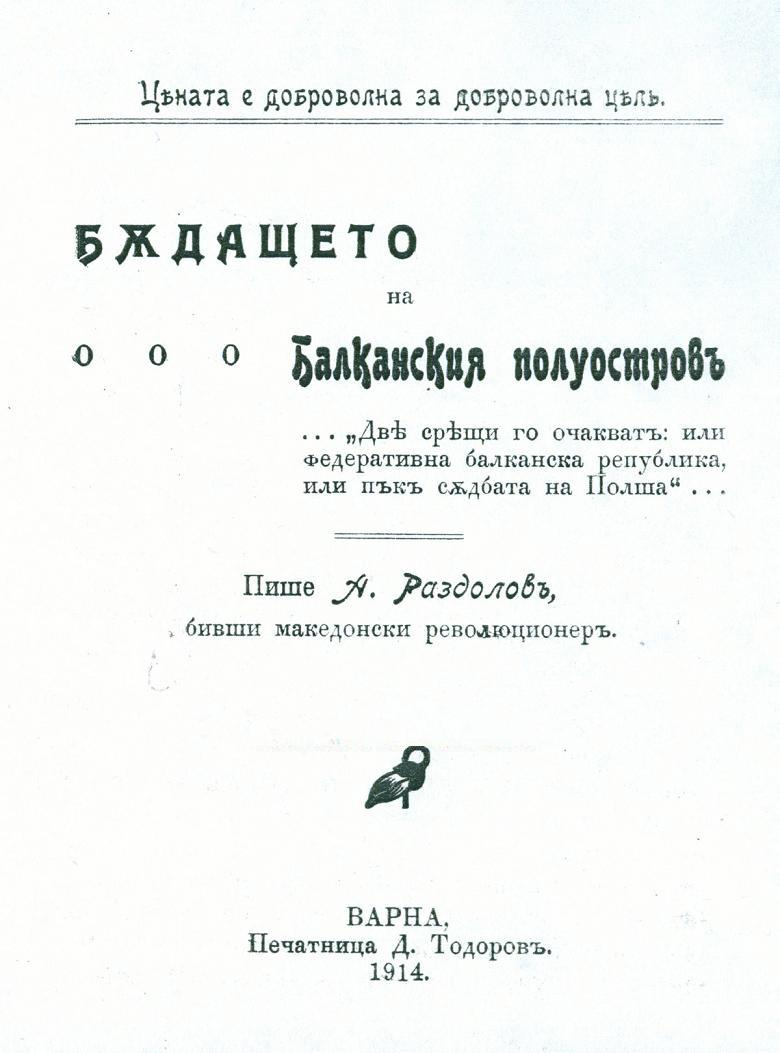
Cover of The future of the Balkan Peninsula
