= Yordan Hadzhikonstantinov-Dzhinot =

Bulgarian teacher and writer (c. 1818–1882)

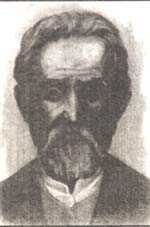
- Born: c. 1818; Veles, Ottoman Empire
- Died: 22 August 1882; Veles, Ottoman Empire

Yordan Hadzhikonstantinov - Dzhinot (Bulgarian: Йордан Хаджиконстантинов - Джинот, Macedonian: Jордан Хаџи Константинов - Џинот, romanized: Jordan Hadži Konstantinov - Džinot, c. 1818 – 22 August 1882), was a Bulgarian teacher, writer, playwright and an important figure of the Bulgarian National Revival in Macedonia during the 19th century.

Hadzhikonstantinov devoted all his life to the cause of secular public education, and he actively promoted the idea of enforcement of spoken vernacular in the schools and applying of modern pedagogical practices.

== Biography ==
Yordan Hadzhikonstantinov, nicknamed Dzhinot, was born around 1818 in Veles, Ottoman Empire (today North Macedonia). Hadzhikonstantinov received his education in Veles, continuing his education in Samokov and the Greek gymnasium in Thessaloniki. In 1838, he became a teacher in his hometown of Veles. Per historian Vemund Aarbakke, as a strong nationalist, he did not permit church singing in Greek in his part of town, nor did he permit Greek teachers in the community. He soon came into conflict with the Phanariot bishop. For three years, he was persecuted by that bishop until he was forced to leave Veles. He taught as a Bulgarian teacher in a school in Skopje from 1848 to 1857. Hadzhikonstantinov introduced the Lancaster educational system and developed active social activities there. Soon, in 1853, he came into a sharp conflict with a bishop and the Greek clergy. He was accused of being a Russian spy and for "inciting Serbs and Bulgarians to revolt." After the Crimean War (1853–1856), metropolitan Yoakim managed to have the authorities arrest him on 20 January 1857 and expel him from Skopje. Later, Hadzhikonstantinov returned to the city, but despite the letters of recommendation he presented from Belgrade, the authorities permanently exiled him.

In 1859, he returned to Veles, and then he worked as a teacher in Prilep for a short time, returning home in early 1860. In 1861, when the Grand Vizier of the Empire visited Veles, the Metropolitan of Bitola accused Hadzhikonstantinov of being a Serbian spy. The authorities found prohibited books and newspapers by Bulgarian revolutionary Georgi Rakovski in his home. The locals tried to defend him. The authorities had Hadzhikonstantinov exiled in Aydın (Asia Minor). During the trip, he was beaten with a whip by the authorities and ended up losing his right eye. Bulgarian locals rejected the accusations against Hadzhikonstantinov and he was released two years later after pressure by the Bulgarian community in Istanbul. He returned to Ottoman Macedonia, where he was a Bulgarian teacher again until 1870. Hadzhikonstantinov-Dzhinot died in Veles on 22 August 1882. His grave is located in the yard of the church of St. Spas in Veles.

== Works, views and legacy ==
Influenced by ideas locating the Indo‑European homeland in India, Hadzhikonstantinov argued that the Bulgarians' origins lay in Vedic India and drew direct parallels between Bulgarian and Sanskrit. Per political scientist Dimitar Bechev, Dzhinot believed that Bulgarians are descendants of the ancient Thracians and Illyrians. In his publications, Hadzhikonstantinov lost no occasion to declare his Bulgarian identity. He openly stated: " I am Bulgarian, and I bewail our lost Bulgarians, who are in Lower Moesia, and it is our duty to lay down our life for our brothers, the dearest Bulgarians". In the 1850s, Hadzhikonstantinov published a chronicle called "A Story about the Restoration of the Bulgarian Patriarchate in 1235" in Belgrade in 1855. He collaborated with the newspapers "Bulgarian Books" and "Macedonia". On 19 July 1852, in Tsarigradski Vestnik, he published his article "Bulgarian Writing", in which he wrote:

We Bulgarians have full and high dignity compared to other Slavs. And they are worthy to pay us honors because we have given them their alphabet. We Bulgarians have an original and abundant language, this is our grammar, this is our vocabulary. Anyone who dares to condemn our Bulgarianness is an image of Mamon (Devil's son).

He published articles, notes and literary works in newspapers. In his articles, he discussed various issues, such as education and upbringing, philological issues, ethnographic and geographical issues, philosophical issues and issues of morality. Hadzhikonstantinov showed much interest in philology, including the issues of Bulgarian grammar and Bulgarian orthography, Old Bulgarian language and etymology. He was interested in philosophy and considered himself as a philosopher. Apart from articles, he also wrote nine plays, of which four were published in Tsarigraski Vestnik ("Minerva and the Nine Muses", "The Teachers and the Student", "Conversation or the Righteous Man", published in 1851, and "Fables"). One play, "Serbia staggers within its own lands", was found in manuscript form, while another is known solely through references. The remaining works include two dramas mentioned by himself in 1853: "Socrates' Phial", and "Dionysius the Tyrant; Damon and Phidias". Finally, he translated "Sophocles' tragedy Antigone" in 1859. He also wrote poems. As such, he was one of the first authors in Bulgarian literature to write and publish plays. His contemporaries regarded him as a classicist, referring to him as "our Trediakovsky".

In the first half of the 19th century, the vernacular was viewed as a low-register language while Church Slavonic held prestige as the language of high culture. From the mid-19th century onward, intellectuals from Macedonia began debating how to construct a modern literary language, weighing options such as blending the vernacular with Church Slavonic or basing it on contemporary spoken dialects. They also debated whether it should serve only Slavic speakers of Ottoman Macedonia or all Slavs in the Ottoman Empire, and how close it should be to other Slavic languages, especially Russian, the cornerstone of Pan-Slavism. Dzhinot was criticized in the Bulgarian press for using the western Macedonian dialects in his textbooks. In an 1851 article in the newspaper Tsarigradski vestnik, the editorial argued that Dzhinot's western Macedonian dialect was so distinct from the Bulgarian written and spoken norm that many Bulgarians would find it incomprehensible and almost foreign. It stated:

"As concerns the language of Mr. Yordan, anyone can see that it is so different from our written and spoken language, so that to a person reading it for the first time it will appear not only incomprehensible but completely different. [...] it can be more easily learned and spoken correctly by a foreigner, and not by a native Bulgarian. May the residents of Skopje forgive us, along with those who speak a similar language; since they do not understand our language nor can they speak it."

Džinot was one of the participants in the debate among Slavs in the Ottoman Empire in the last third of the 19th century. The debate intensified among Bulgarian intellectuals after the establishment of Bulgarian administrative autonomy, and among Macedonian intellectuals it raised new questions once cultural and political unification proved impossible. Per Victor Friedman, the Bulgarian rejection of textbooks written in Macedonian dialects, and the reactions this provoked, contributed to the emergence of a distinct Macedonian linguistic and ethnic consciousness. Per historian Andrew Rossos, he did not have a clearly defined national or territorial consciousness, or a sense of belonging. In 1854, he reported to Tsarigradski Vestnik about his visit to the "Bulgarian-Serbian city Skopje in Albanian Macedonia" and that the people there spoke "Slav (Bulgarian-Serbian)." Furthermore, he used various terms to describe his people, such as "Bulgarians (Bolgari)", "Serbs (Srbi)", "Slav Christian", just "Slavs (Slavyani)", or "Slavchinya", and for himself "hardcore Slav (tvrdi Slavyan)". According to historian Blaže Ristovski, the concentration of našizam (the distinction between "we" and "you") was built on that stage. Per Slavist Wolf Oschlies, he viewed the Macedonians ethnically and linguistically as a transitional link between the Bulgarians and Serbs, which he expressed through various terminologies. According to historian Roumen Daskalov, Hadzhikonstantinov endorsed Slavophile and Pan-Slav views, to dissolve the Bulgarian identity and community into the wider Slavic identity and community, perhaps due to a feeling of inferiority in front of Greek culture in Macedonia and the need to have a common Slavic identity, culture and language.

In the second half of the 19th century, secular themes became popular in literature, creating a need for new vocabulary to express modern concepts. Džinot was among the first to introduce words from Latin, Church Slavonic, and Classical Greek into his language. He also worked to simplify Church Slavonic orthography, which had no standardized rules at the time. On grammar, he supported using Church Slavonic patterns, including restoring morphological cases. He also argued for accepting vernacular forms already known in Church Slavonic, such as the prepositions vo and so, believing this would bring the new Macedonian literary closer to other Slavic languages and serve as a means of unification.

Hadzhikonstantinov also declared himself as a Serb. In 1856, in his letter to Society of Serbian Letters, he wrote: "I remain ready to serve you most usefully and quietly as a Serb." In the same letter, he declared himself as a "Serbian son", and wrote: "You cannot understand how much my heart burns for our dearest Serbdom, for which I am ready to sacrifice myself.". In his letters to the society, he stressed that Greek bishops and Grecomans were a greater evil than the Turks. Dzhinot wrote the play "Serbia staggers within its own lands" for the Society of Serbian Letters, where he protests Macedonia's political and spiritual subjugation. The play advocated for native Slavic education over Greek Phanariot influence, while positioning Serbia as a leader and source of material and moral support, followed by personified Balkan lands of Thrace, Romania, Bulgaria, Albania and Macedonia. In an 1858 letter to the Serbian Ministry of Justice and Education, while requesting books for the schools in the villages Galičnik, Banjane, Kožle, Dračevo, Pobožje, Kučevište and the monastery St. Archangel Michael, he wrote: "We pray that you endow these places, so that we may open a path toward exploring our Serbian antiquity."

Hadzhikonstantinov remained a bachelor throughout his life.

According to the post-WWII Macedonian rendition of history, Dzhinot had an ethnic Macedonian identity and promoted education in Macedonian.

== Sources ==
- Кънчов, В. (1970). Избрани произведения (in Bulgarian). Vol. T. II. София: Наука и изкуство. pp. 138–153, 230–231, 264–250. Archived from the original on 2007-09-27.
- Тъпкова-Заимова, В.; Милтенова, А. (1996). Историко-апокалиптичната книжнина във Византия и в средновековна България (in Bulgarian). София: Университетско изсдателство "Св. Климент Охридски". pp. 311–321. ISBN 954-07-0766-8.
- Modern Greek Studies Program. University of Minnesota. 1992.
- Clarke, James Franklin (1988). Dennis P. Hupchick (ed.). The pen and the sword: studies in Bulgarian history. East European Monographs. East European Monographs. ISBN 0-88033-149-6.
