= Gavril Svetogorec =

Macedonian Orthodox saint and bishop

Saint Gavril Svetogorec
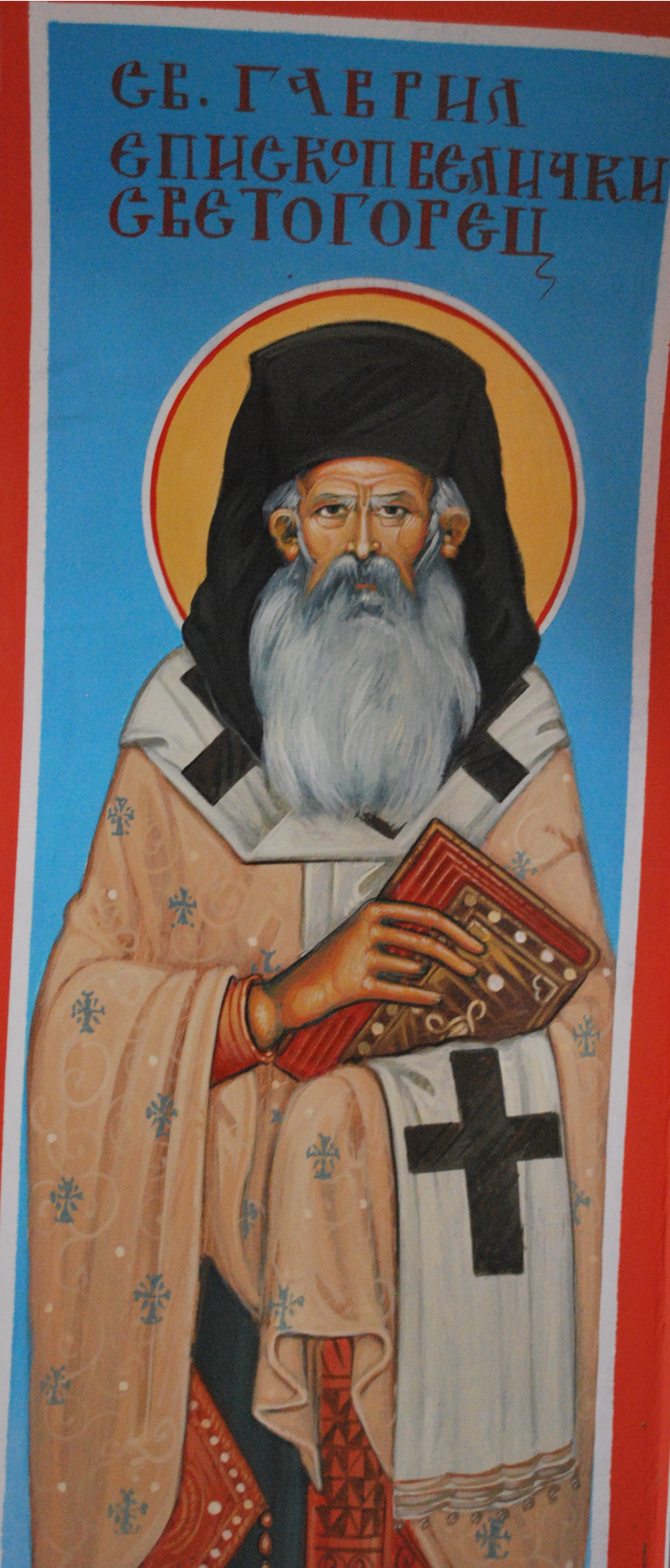
- Icon of Saint Gavril Svetogorec

Bishop of Velika
- Born: Mijalče Parnadžiev; 10 March 1926; Štip, Kingdom of Yugoslavia
- Died: 12 January 1990; Lesnovo Monastery, SFR Yugoslavia
- Venerated in: Eastern Orthodox Church
- Canonized: 28 May 2017 by Macedonian Orthodox Church – Ohrid Archbishopric
- Feast: 12 January

Gavril Svetogorec (Gabriel of Mount Athos; 10 March 1926 – 12 January 1990) was an Eastern Orthodox monk, ascetic, and Macedonian Orthodox bishop. In 2017, he was canonized as a saint by the Macedonian Orthodox Church.

== Biography ==
He was born as Mijalče Parnadžiev on 10 March 1926 in Štip, Kingdom of Yugoslavia, to Eastern Orthodox parents. Parnadžiev graduated from primary school and high school in Štip. In 1944, Parnadžiev joined the Yugoslav Partizans, becoming involved in World War II in Yugoslav Macedonia. Later, he became part of a defense unit stationed on the borders, including in Delčevo, Kavadarci, and the Kajmakčalan mountain. According to Macedonian Orthodox Church's hagiography, due to his service, Parnadžiev was recommended for membership in the Communist Party of Yugoslavia, but he was excluded because he went to church. He earned the rank of sergeant and was awarded the Order of Merit for People. After the war, Parnadžiev worked in the People's Committee in Štip and participated in public works projects, including in New Belgrade. In 1955, he graduated in sculpture from the University of Belgrade.

He worked as a professor of art in the Štip gymnasium and made sculptures that were placed around the city. From 1963, Parnadžiev served as a monk of Agiou Pavlou Monastery at Mount Athos, where he gained ascetic experience. There he took the monastic name Gavril (Gabriel), after the archangel Gabriel. After returning to Yugoslav Macedonia in 1971, he continued his monastic asceticism, staying in monasteries in the Skopje region, such as "St. Mary" in the village Pobožje, "St. Mary" at Matka Canyon, and the Markov monastery, "St. Demetrius". He became the abbot of Lesnovo Monastery In December 1975. His father also came to the monastery, becoming a monk named Kiril. After six years serving in Lesnovo Monastery, the Holy Synod of the Macedonian Orthodox Church appointed him as an archimandrite on 30 June 1981. He spent the rest of his life in Lesnovo Monastery as a hermit and ascetic. He advocated for monastic renewal in Yugoslav Macedonia and became the spiritual father of many Orthodox believers, familiarizing them with Jesus Prayer. Shortly before his death, the Holy Synod of the Macedonian Orthodox Church consecrated him as Bishop of Velika on 28 August 1989. Internal conflicts in the Macedonian Orthodox Church affected his consecration. He died on 12 January 1990 at Lesnovo Monastery.

== Legacy ==
His grave behind the temple of Lesnovo Monastery became a sanctuary for pilgrims. Only one sculpture of his has remained in front of the entrance to the "Makedonka" textile factory in Štip, while the rest are absent. He was officially canonized as a saint by the Macedonian Orthodox Church – Ohrid Archbishopric on 28 May 2017 in the cathedral "St. Nicholas" in Štip in the Bregalnica Diocese. His feast day is commemorated annually on 12 January. His relics have been preserved by Lesnovo Monastery and Simonopetra Monastery.

== Writings ==
Parnadžiev was also a prolific author of works of theological prose and poetry, such as:

- Poetry Collection (1975)
- Holy Mountain – Heavenly Land (1978)
- Before the Greatest Jubilee of Man (1980)
- Rules and Regulations of the Orthodox Church on Fasting (1994)
- Father Cherubim (1997)
