= Kanal 77 =

Radio Kanal 77
- North Macedonia
- Frequency: See list

Programming
- Format: Contemporary hit radio, adult contemporary, talk radio

Ownership
- Owner: Goran Gavrilov

History
- First air date: 1991

Links
- Webcast: Listen Live
- Website: www.kanal77.com.mk

Radio Kanal 77 (Macedonian: Радио Канал 77, transliteration: Radio Kanal 77) is a private national radio station broadcasting in North Macedonia, with its headquarters located in Štip, and studios located in Skopje and Bitola. It started broadcasting in 1991, and since then it is one of the most listened radios in North Macedonia. Kanal 77 is broadcasting on 89.7 FM in Skopje, 106.0 FM and 103.2 FM in Bitola, 104.1 FM in Prilep, 105.4 FM in Ohrid, 101.9 FM in Tetovo and Gostivar, 103.8 FM in Štip, 101.8 FM Radoviš, 102.9 FM in Strumica.

== Programme ==
Radio Kanal 77 has an informative programme. In Kanal 77's 25-year existence, the programme is constantly improving and developing, so today there are 155 minutes a day of news distributed throughout the day, starting from 7am to 24pm.

The news programme presents various topics, from politics and economy to culture and sport, as well as rebroadcasting news from Radio Free Europe. Kanal 77's principles are quick and timely information to listeners, diversity in the programme, as well as objectivity and impartiality towards the choice of events of the day. Radio Kanal 77's programming scheme includes the production and broadcast of programmes from the economic, political, social, music and sports fields, non-commercial programmes, contact and entertainment shows. Hence, Radio Kanal 77 is the only radio in North Macedonia specializing in news and information programmes. One of the most listened to shows of political-contact character is the Stadium show, in which listeners openly present their views on certain issues.

This way of accessing Channel 77 has so far proved successful and is seen by research conducted by agencies such as Strategic Marketing, IRI, Broadcasting Council, etc. In 2008, the number of news listeners and radio reports (news with a length of 3 minutes every half hour) increased by 25–30% compared to 2004. According to opinion polls conducted by SMMRI, Brima Galup and Idea International, Radio Channel 77 has the best rating among listeners and is the number one news radio in North Macedonia. One channel 77 news release has an average of about 110,000 listeners, which is equal to 10% of the population at any time.

== Frequencies ==
- 89.7 MHz in Skopje
- 106.0 MHz in Bitola
- 104.1 MHz in Prilep
- 101.9 MHz in Ohrid
- 101.9 MHz in Tetovo, Gostivar
- 103.8 MHz in Štip
- 101.8 MHz in Radoviš
- 102.9 MHz in Strumica
- 102.7 MHz in Kumanovo
- 106.8 MHz in Kriva Palanka
- 105.1 MHz in Kratovo
- 101.8 MHz in Kočani
- 102.7 MHz in Delčevo
- 92.3 MHz in Berovo
- 101.5 MHz in Gevgelija
- 106.9 MHz in Struga
