= Kežovica =

Coordinates: 41°43′59″N 22°10′35″E

The Kežovica mineral spa (Macedonian: Бања Кежовица) is situated near the southern Štip suburb of Novo Selo in North Macedonia, just after the canyon that the river Bregalnica forms when exiting the city. The water temperature is 74 °C (165 °F) at the source and is slightly radioactive, which is used for medicinal purposes. There is a thermal bath built in the vicinity of the main spring, as well as a hospital unit, specializing in physiotherapy performed in pools filled with water from the mineral springs.

There is a secondary mineral hot spring in the suburb of Novo Selo itself called L'dzhite, which is regularly used by the local residents. This spring is also considered to be part of the Kežovica system. The area in east-central North Macedonia between the cities of Štip and Kratovo is a site of many dormant and extinguished volcanoes, and the greater area has high seismic risk.

== Miscellaneous ==
- "Kežovica" is also the name of the second official football team of the city of Štip, the first being called "Bregalnica-Stip".

== See also ==
- North Macedonia
