= Vasil Glavinov =

Socialist from Ottoman Macedonia

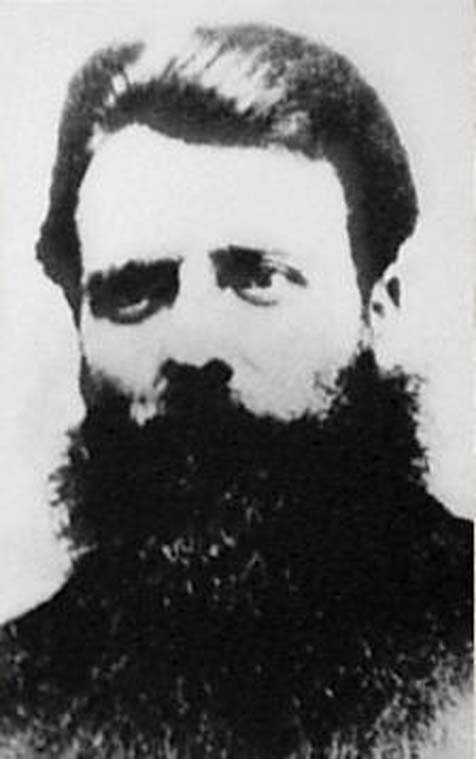
- Born: 1868 or 1869; Köprülü, Ottoman Empire
- Died: 1929; Sofia, Bulgaria
- Occupation: socialist politician

Vasil Kostov Glavinov (Bulgarian and Macedonian: Васил Костов Главинов; 1868 or 1869 – 1929) was a Bulgarian left-wing politician from Ottoman Macedonia, and an activist of the Bulgarian workers' movement.

== Life ==
Glavinov studied in his native school in Veles ran by Yordan Hadzhikonstantinov-Dzhinot. Then he worked here, before moving to Sofia in 1887. There, he found employment in a brickworks, but later he went bankrupt, owing to the financial support which he gave to the first Bulgarian theatre troupe. In July 1891 on the initiative of Dimitar Blagoev, several social democratic circles united to form the Bulgarian Social democratic Party. In 1892, Glavinov became acquainted with Dimitar Blagoev's exposition of the Marxist view of history and in 1894 he entered the new Bulgarian Social Democratic Workers Party. In the same year, under Vasil Glavinov's leadership and in order of Blagoev, the first Social-Democratic group in Ottoman Macedonia was formed in Veles.

In 1896, Glavinov founded a Macedonian-Adrianople Social Democratic Group, as part of the Bulgarian Workers' Social-Democrat Party. The last idea was probably influenced by the League for the Balkan Confederation, created in 1894 by Balkan socialists, which supported Macedonian autonomy inside a general federation of Southeast Europe. In Sofia Glavinov edited several Socialist papers. He met there one of the leaders of the Internal Macedonian-Adrianople Revolutionary Organization (IMARO) Gotse Delchev and both became a friends. Glavinov and Delchev were feeling the lack of funds, and both decided to steal a money from Bulgarian Posts. Their friend Zlatarev took 28,000 leva from the post-office in Kyustendil and fled over the border into Ottoman Macedonia. He had passed on 25,000 leva to Glavinov and his relative Kiprov, to give it to Delchev. The IMARO didn't receive the money. Glavinov maintained that both had buried the leva near a river which had subsequently flooded the area and carried it away. It is assumed that the money was diverted to support the socialist group around Glavinov.

The first Conference of Macedonian Socialists was held on June 3, 1900, near Krushevo, where the activities of Vasil Glavinov's political group defined the basic aspects of the creation of Macedonian republic as a part of Balkan Socialist Federation. This "federative Macedonian republic," (some kind of Switzerland on the Balkans), would be with a cantonal organization, with separate territorial units for all the "national elements" living there. During the beginning of the 20th century Glavinov was politically active in Sofia. He was arrested as one of the main organizers of the 1st May Day demonstrations in Sofia in 1902. In 1904-1905 he became more active as leader of the Macedonian-Adrianople Socialist Group.

After the Young Turk Revolution in 1908, he moved back to the Ottoman Empire and initially gravitated around the People's Federative Party (Bulgarian Section). The newspaper "Rabotnicheska Iskra" (Worker's Spark), edited by him, described the two rivaling Bulgarian parties in the Ottoman Empire at the time: the PFP (Bulgarian Section) and the Union of the Bulgarian Constitutional Clubs. According to the newspaper, both of the parties, the former a defender of the poorer Bourgeois, the latter - of the richer, were nationalist and were led by desires of unification with Bulgaria. Because of that, Glavinov was disappointed and entered the Ottoman Socialist Party in Salonica in 1910. It was actually not a real political party, but rather a group of intellectuals. In the same year he participated also in the First Balkan Socialist Conference held in Belgrade, which important aspect was the call for a solution to the Macedonian Question. After the Young Turks had taken stringent measures against it, difficult times began for the Ottoman Socialist Party. As a consequence, on the eve of the Balkan Wars in 1911 Glavinov moved back to Sofia, where he joined the Bulgarian Social Democratic Workers' Party (Narrow Socialists).

During the Balkan Wars and World War I, he was a member of the leadership of the Narrow Socialists' Organization in Sofia and of the leadership of its trade union organization. Here he opposed the Balkan Wars and World War I and was sympathetic to the October Revolution in Russia. In 1919 his Narrow Socialists joined the Comintern and were reorganised as the Bulgarian Communist Party. In 1920 Glavinov was elected as a member of the Central Emigrant's Commission to the Central Committee of the Party. He was arrested several times after the 1923 Bulgarian coup d'état. After the St Nedelya Church assault on 16 April 1925 he was arrested again and afterwards Glavinov withdrew from active political life. He died in Sofia in 1929.
