= Zoran Vanev =

Macedonian pop-folk singer (born 1973)

Zoran Vanev Зоран Ванев
- Also known as: Zoki
- Born: 1973 (age 52–53); Štip, SR Macedonia, SFR Yugoslavia
- Genres: Turbo-folk, music, pop-folk
- Occupation: Singer
- Instrument: Vocalist
- Years active: 1993–2011

Zoran "Zoki" Vanev (Serbian/Macedonian: Зоран Ванев) is a Macedonian pop-folk singer.

He was born in Štip, Macedonia, Yugoslavia and began his career in 1993 with the release of his song "Angela". He enjoyed moderate success in the Macedonian music industry in the 1990s, however his popularity in Macedonia declined by the turn of the century.

In 2003, he released his first Serbian album and is enjoying a successful career in Serbia and in Bosnia and Herzegovina. Many of his songs are about the city of Belgrade but some also mention cities in Bosnia most notably in his song Banja Luka, Beograd. Some of his hits in Serbian include "Lila", "Monika" and "Južna pruga".

He later stopped his music career and moved to Switzerland where he currently lives with his family and works with health insurance.

== Discography ==
- Lila (2003)
- Momak i Po (2004)
- Tanga (2005)
- Banjaluka, Beograd (2007)
- Unnamed record (2009)
