= Štip =

Štip Штип (Macedonian)
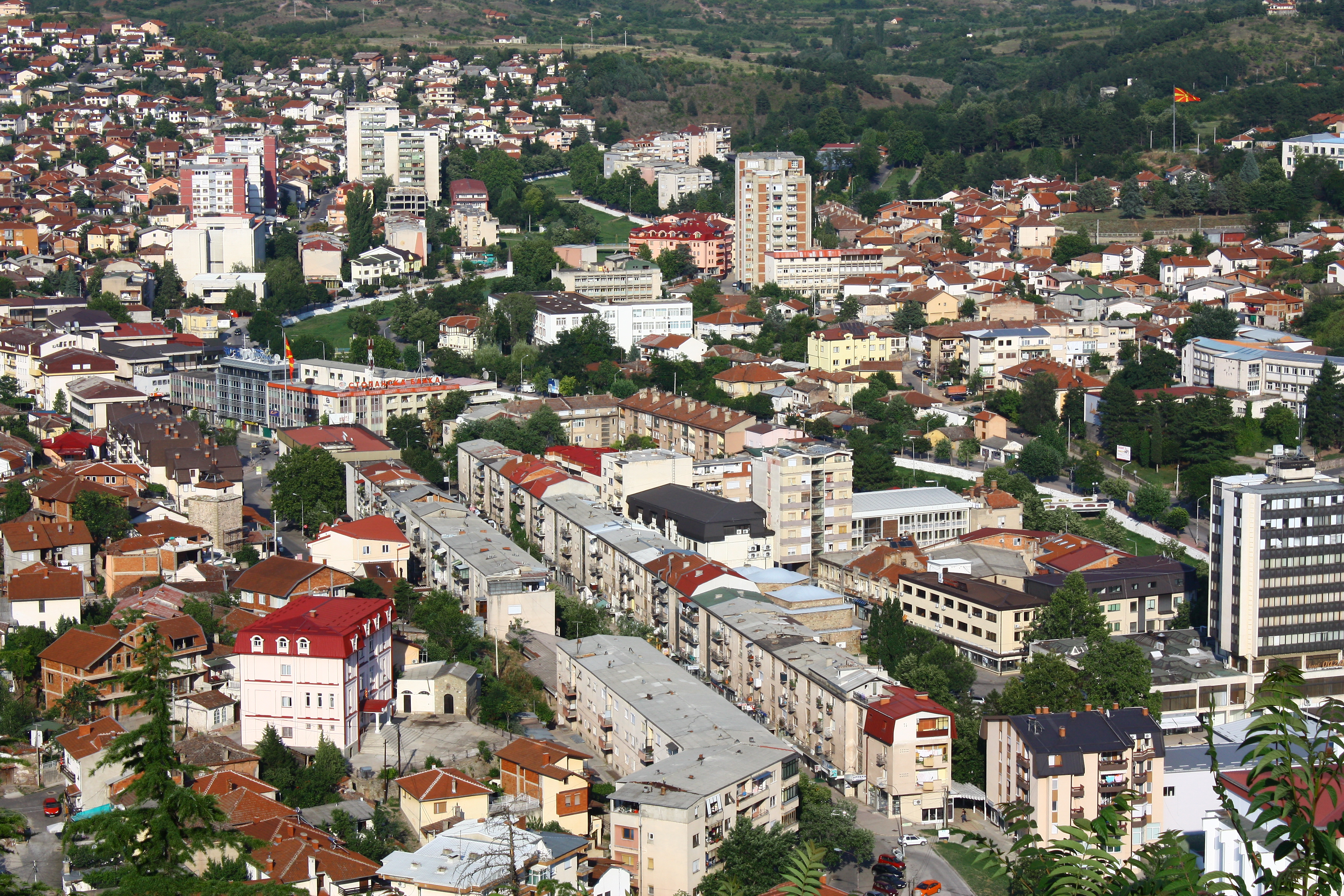
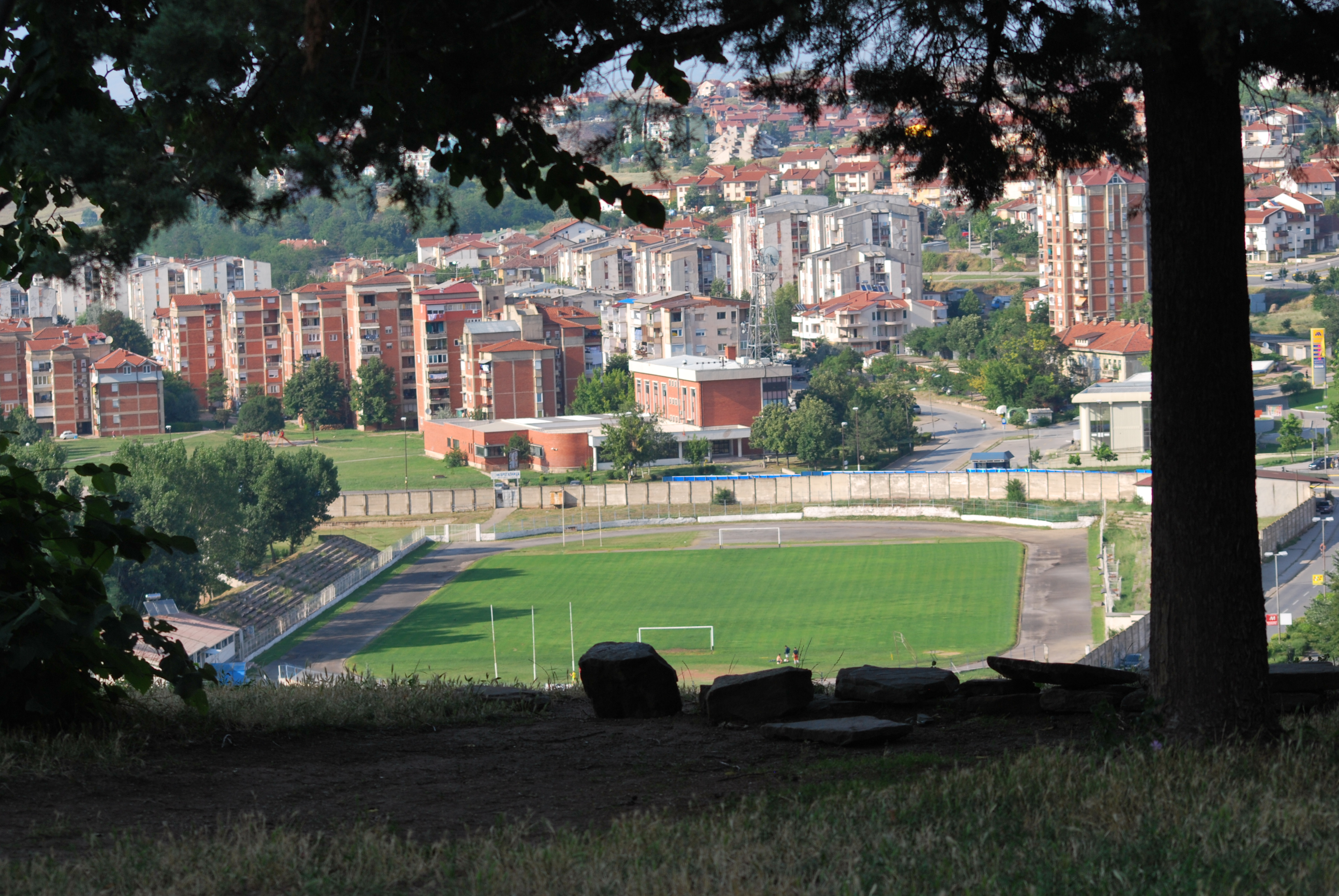
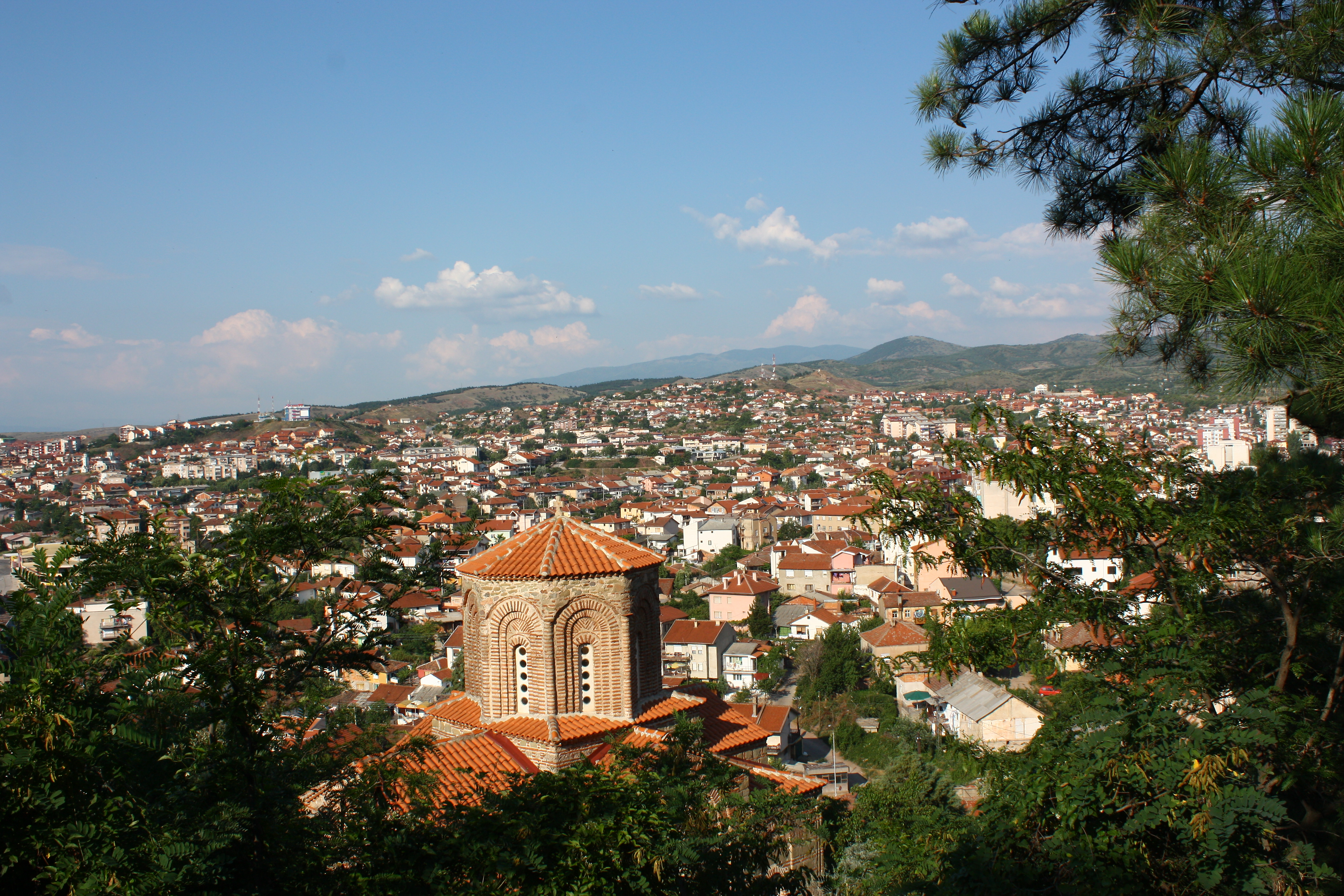
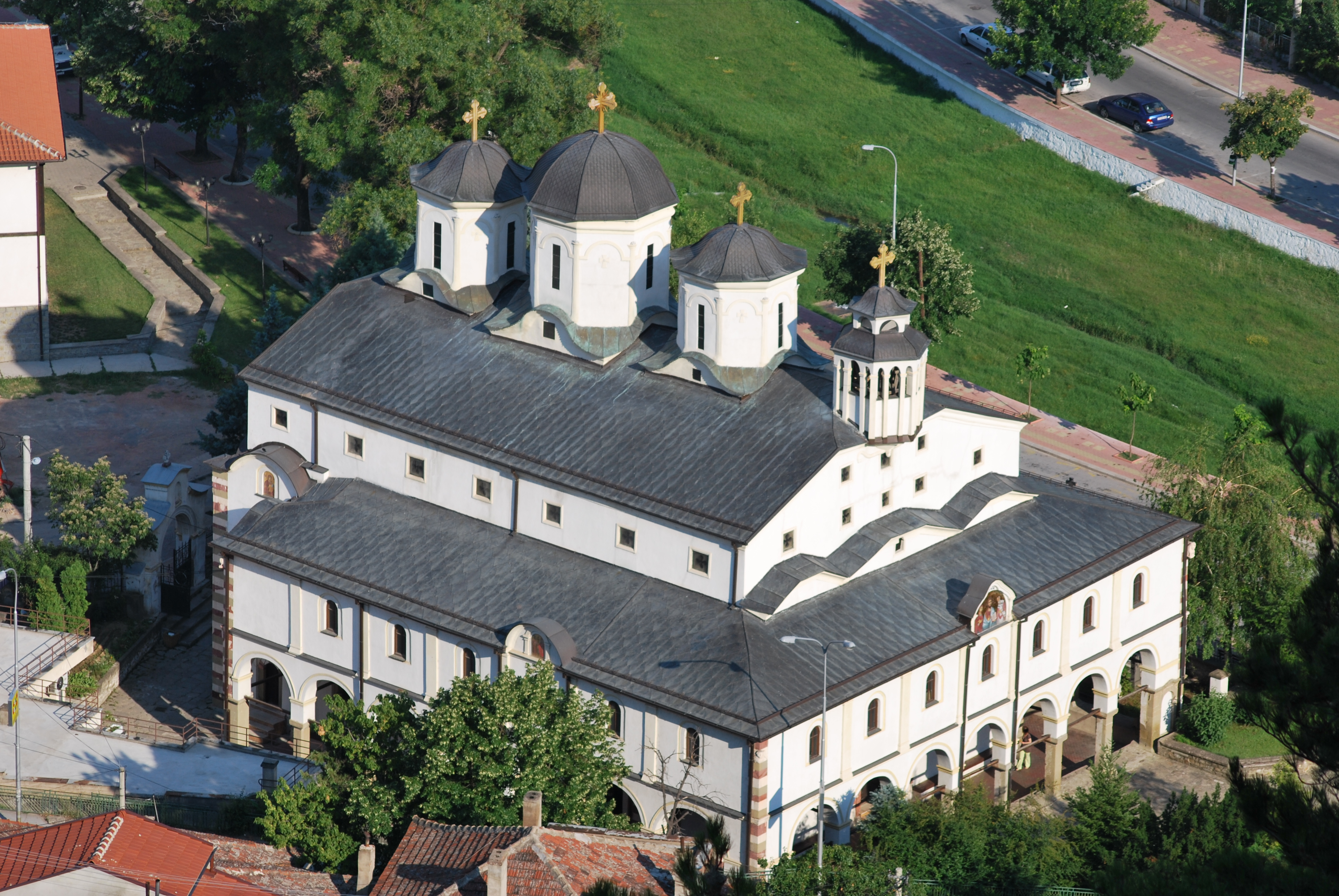
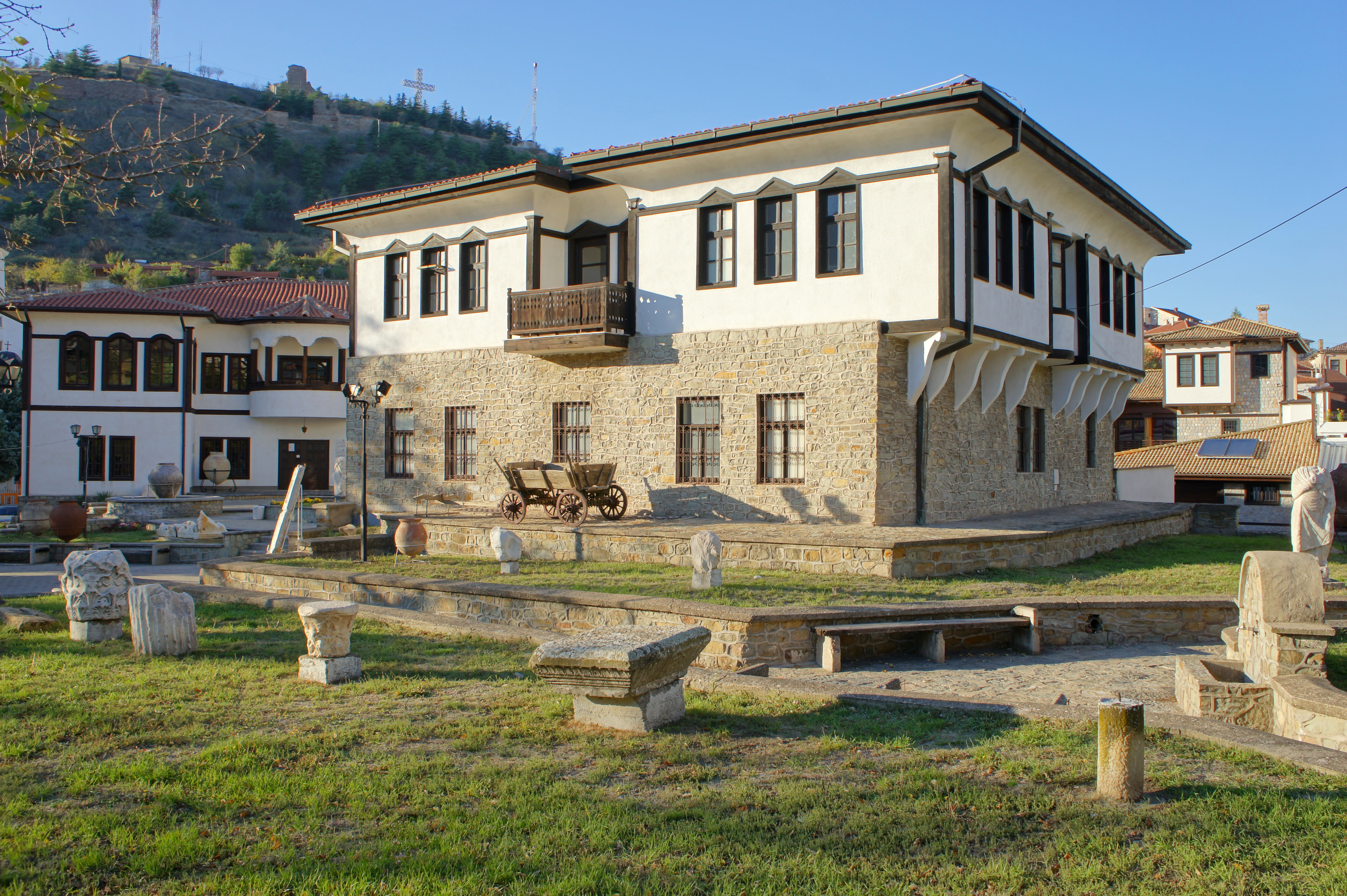
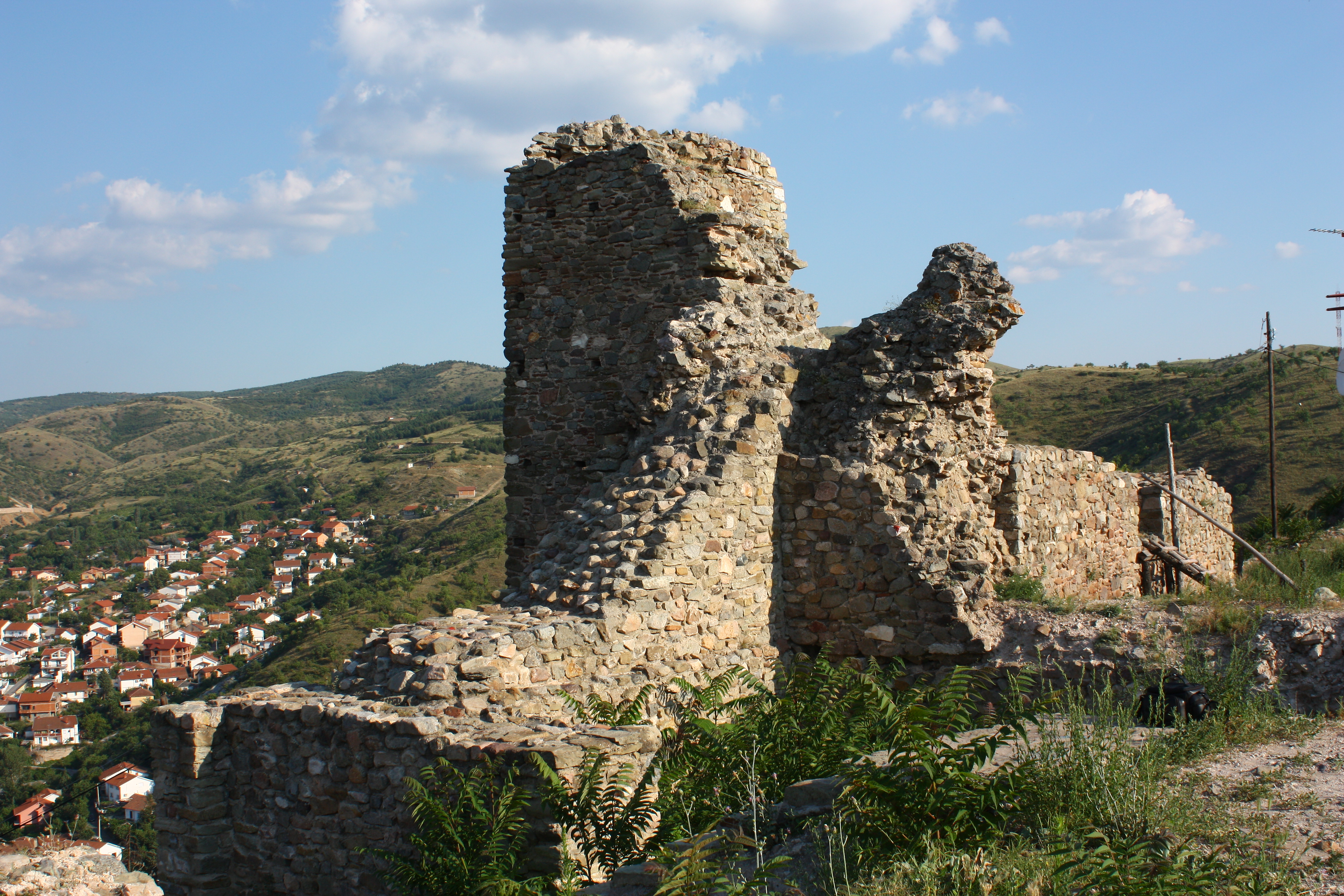
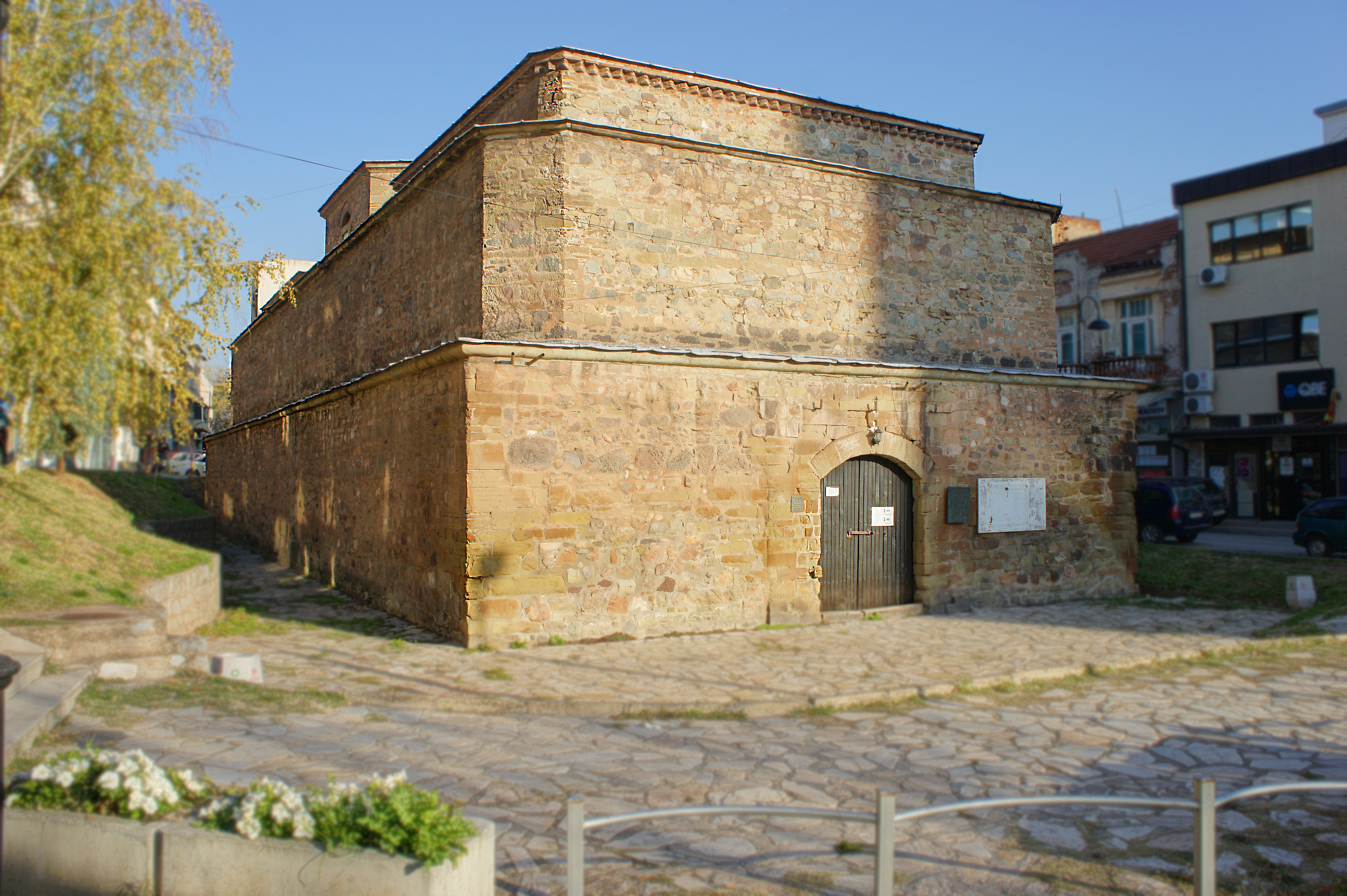
- View of Štip

- Flag Coat of arms

- Location within North Macedonia
- Coordinates: 41°44′15.01″N 22°11′36.81″E
- Country: North Macedonia
- Region: Eastern
- Municipality: Štip
- Founded: 1st century AD

Government
  - Mayor: Ivan Jordanov (VMRO-DPMNE)

Population (2021)
  - Total: 42,000
- Time zone: UTC+1 (CET)
  - Summer (DST): UTC+2 (CEST)
- Postal code: 2000
- Area code: +389 32
- Vehicle registration: ST
- Climate: Cfa
- Website: www.Stip.gov.mk/

Štip (Macedonian: Штип [ʃtip]) is the largest urban agglomeration in the eastern part of North Macedonia, serving as the economic, industrial, entertainment and educational focal point for the surrounding municipalities.

As of the 2021 census, Štip had a population of about 44,866, making it North Macedonia's sixth most populous city.

Štip is the largest textile production center in the country. It is the center of the fashion industry in North Macedonia, as well as the site of the sole public university in eastern North Macedonia, the Goce Delčev University of Štip.

The city is the eponymous seat of the Municipality of Štip.

== Name ==
The name Astibos is first mentioned by the ancient historian Polyaenus in the 2nd century BC, who notes that Paeonian kings did ritualistic bathing in the Astibo/Brigantium (today: Bregalnica) river, as a coronation ritual. Astibo is also marked in the Tabula Peutingeriana, as one of the stations from Stobi (near modern Gradsko) to Serdica (today: Sofia). The name evolved from the ancient Astibos, to Byzantine Stipeon, to modern Štip.

It is generally acknowledged that the Slavic 'Štip' follows Proto-Albanian phonetic rules and was acquired via the Albanian 'Shtip'. Shtip may indicate that Proto-Albanian was spoken in the region in pre-Slavic antiquity. The local Aromanian community also refer to the city as Shtip.

== Geography and climate ==
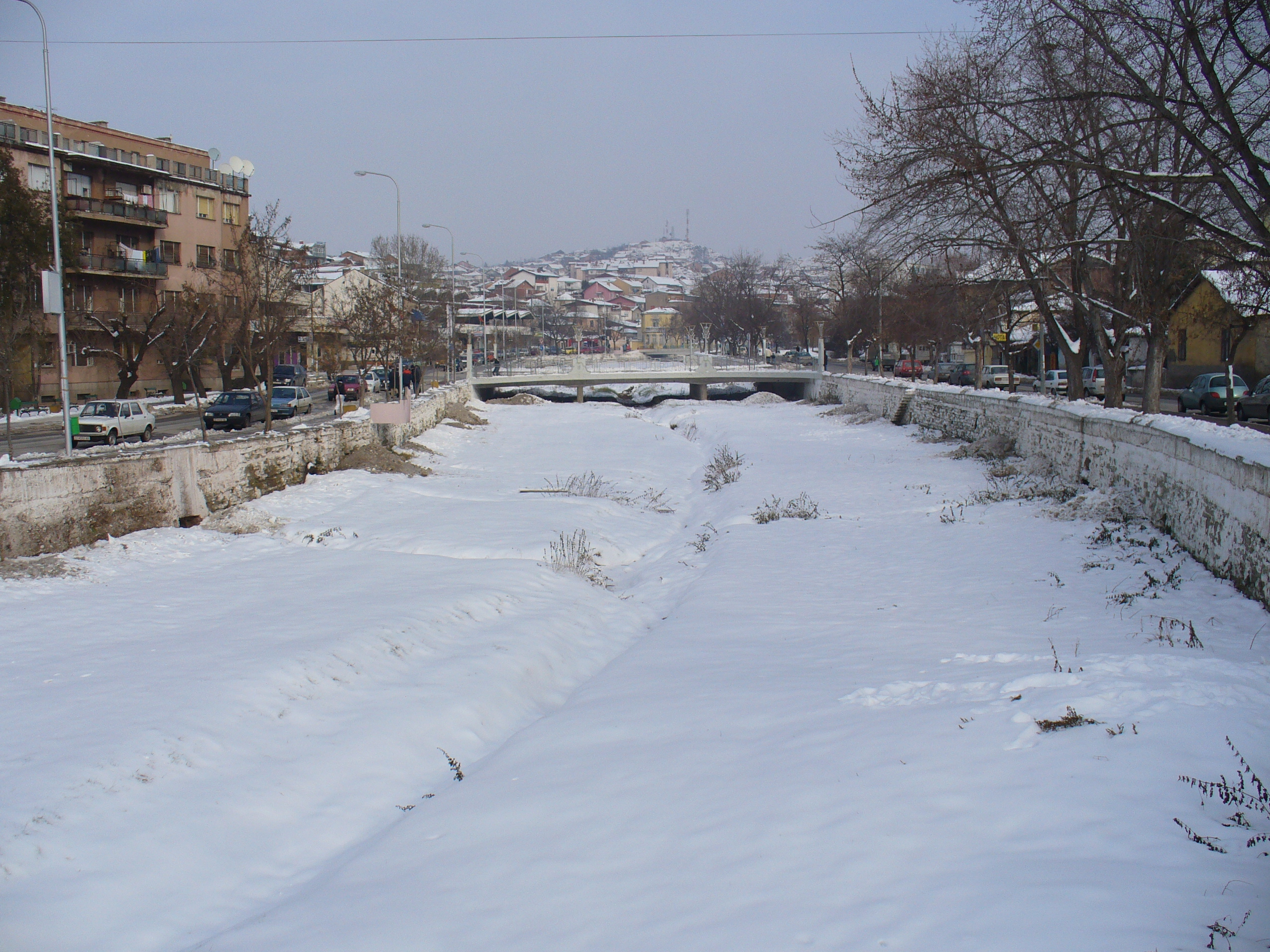
Snow-covered Otinja river

The city is located at the intersection of the Lakavica, Ovče Pole, and Kočani valleys.

Two rivers pass through Štip,

- the Bregalnica river, which is the second longest in North Macedonia, and
- the Otinja river, which divides the city center.

The Isar hill, with its early medieval fortress on top, dominates the city and provides for the common reference as "The town under the Isar".

The area surrounding the city is suffering from deforestation which is contributing to the extreme temperatures, summers being hot and dry with mean temperatures around 32 °C (90 °F) and days above 40 °C (104 °F) being common. Winters are short (usually less than 2 months) and mild (though considered cold for the area) with normal temperatures around −2 °C (28 °F), but with occasional drops down to −10 °C (14 °F). Spring usually comes in February, when most of the foliage is regenerating, although freak snow storms could appear as late as May.

The soil is mostly sandy, and has large patches of red soil (Macedonian: Црвеница, crvenica) which indicates large percentage of Iron in the soil.

The geographical area of the city of Štip is bordered

- by the Plačkovica mountain to the east,
- by the Krivolak valley to the southeast,
- by the estuary of the river Bregalnica in the southwest, and
- by its alluvial plain in the north.

Climate data for Štip
Month	Jan	Feb	Mar	Apr	May	Jun	Jul	Aug	Sep	Oct	Nov	Dec	Year
Record high °C (°F)	15.0 (59.0)	21.0 (69.8)	26.1 (79.0)	32.8 (91.0)	36.0 (96.8)	38.0 (100.4)	42.6 (108.7)	38.9 (102.0)	35.0 (95.0)	30.6 (87.1)	23.9 (75.0)	20.0 (68.0)	42.6 (108.7)
Mean daily maximum °C (°F)	4.5 (40.1)	8.1 (46.6)	12.7 (54.9)	18.1 (64.6)	23.2 (73.8)	27.3 (81.1)	30.1 (86.2)	30.0 (86.0)	26.2 (79.2)	19.5 (67.1)	11.9 (53.4)	6.1 (43.0)	18.1 (64.6)
Daily mean °C (°F)	0.7 (33.3)	3.5 (38.3)	7.5 (45.5)	12.5 (54.5)	17.3 (63.1)	21.1 (70.0)	23.4 (74.1)	23.0 (73.4)	19.2 (66.6)	13.4 (56.1)	7.4 (45.3)	2.4 (36.3)	12.6 (54.7)
Mean daily minimum °C (°F)	−2.8 (27.0)	−0.8 (30.6)	2.5 (36.5)	6.6 (43.9)	11.0 (51.8)	14.3 (57.7)	16.1 (61.0)	15.8 (60.4)	12.4 (54.3)	7.7 (45.9)	3.1 (37.6)	−1.1 (30.0)	7.1 (44.8)
Record low °C (°F)	−19.5 (−3.1)	−18.0 (−0.4)	−10.6 (12.9)	−1.1 (30.0)	2.8 (37.0)	7.0 (44.6)	8.3 (46.9)	7.5 (45.5)	2.0 (35.6)	−5.0 (23.0)	−9.0 (15.8)	−14.5 (5.9)	−19.5 (−3.1)
Average precipitation mm (inches)	30.0 (1.18)	29.0 (1.14)	33.1 (1.30)	39.9 (1.57)	57.6 (2.27)	47.3 (1.86)	37.5 (1.48)	31.7 (1.25)	31.6 (1.24)	44.0 (1.73)	52.2 (2.06)	40.3 (1.59)	474.0 (18.66)
Average precipitation days (≥ 0.1 mm)	7	7	10	10	10	6	4	4	4	7	9	9	86
Average relative humidity (%)	80	75	68	63	63	59	53	54	59	68	78	82	67
Mean monthly sunshine hours	86.9	112.5	161.1	198.4	245.2	276.3	323.0	305.4	247.5	188.2	114.8	79.6	2,338.9
Source: Deutscher Wetterdienst (sun 1961–1990) (Note: Station ID for Stip is 13591 Use this station ID to locate the sunshine duration)

== History ==
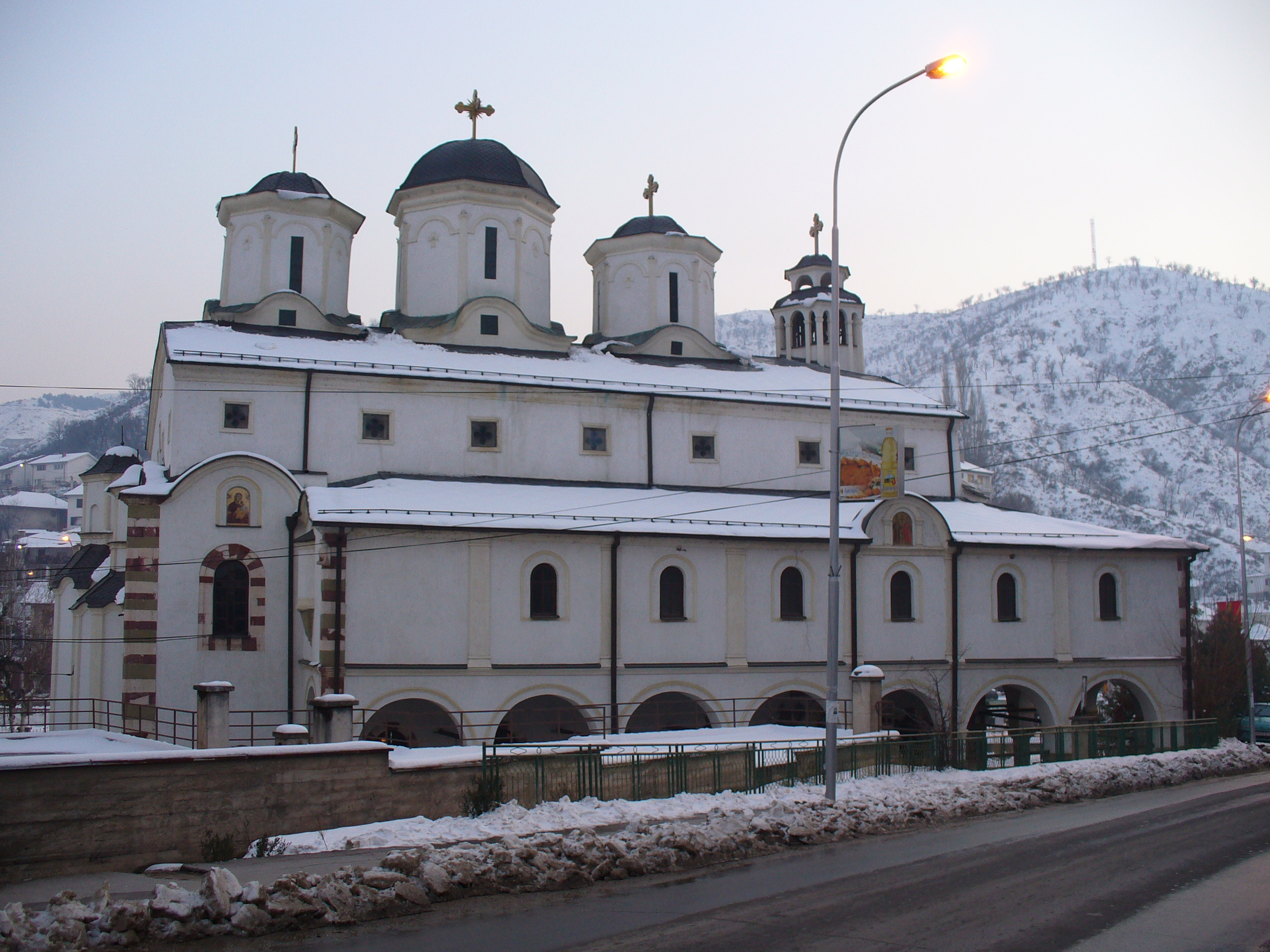
St. Nikola Church

=== Antiquity ===
It is probable that the capital of the Paeonian royal house was in the area of Astibus (Astivos, Άστιβος in Ancient Greek).

The Paeonians were situated in the region west of the fertile Axius river basin, around the 5th and 4th centuries BC. The two tribes that lived along the river Astibo, an estuary to the Axius, were the Derrones, named after their god of healing, Darron, and the Laeaeans, who minted their own heavy coins as a sign of their sovereignty following the example of the Greek city-states on Chalkidiki. Although these tribes were heavily weakened by the Persian invasion of 480 BC, led by King Xerxes I, they remained a formidable power and a well-organized people, renowned for the production of their exceptionally heavy coins with emblems including domesticated specimens of the wild aurochs for which Paeonia was also famous. They were absorbed into the Macedonian Empire by Alexander I before 360 BC.

The area itself is first mentioned in the writings of the historian Polien from the 3rd century BC, who talks of a river named "Astibo" which is presumed to be the river Bregalnica today. Polien also states that the Paeonian kings were crowned in Astibo.

The first mention of a settlement dates to the reign of Roman emperor Tiberius (14-37 AD), when Estipeon is mentioned as an important settlement in the Roman province of Macedonia and the second stop on the Roman road from Stobi to Pautalia.

In the 6th century, the Slavs raided the Balkans and destroyed the Byzantine settlement, and the Slavic tribe of Sagudates permanently settled the area.

=== Middle Ages ===
Many rulers controlled the area of Štip during the early Middle Ages.

Štip was part of the Bulgarian Empire, but after the Byzantine victory in the Battle of Kleidion in 1014 it fell again under Byzantine rule until the reestablishment of the Bulgarian Empire in 1185.

From the mid-13th century the town changed hands several times.

By 1284, Serbian King Stefan Milutin conquered the region; he mentioned Štip explicitly in 1308 and did not wish to give it up to the Byzantines.

In a document of Serbian Tsar Stefan Uroš that dates between 1293 and 1302, in which the citizens of Štip are named, there are several figures listed with Albanian names and anthroponomy. Furthermore, in a 1330 letter by Serbian Tsar Stefan Dušan, several figures with Albanian names and anthroponomy (including the last name Arbanasin, which literally means Albanian) were recorded.

In 1334, the Church of the Holy Archangel in Štip, built by protosebastos Hrelja who held the region under the Serbian crown, was according to his wish granted (metochion) to Hilandar, in a charter of King Stefan Dušan.

The region was annexed by the Ottoman Empire in a raid in 1385, after having been ruled by the Ottoman vassal Konstantin Dejanović. It was known as İştip and was made the seat of a sanjak.

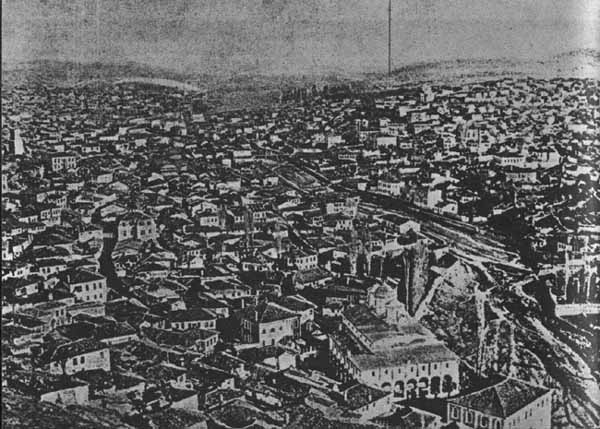
Štip at the end of the 19th century

There is little information about the development of Štip during Ottoman rule which would continue for the next five centuries, interrupted only during 1689–1690 when the city was taken by the Austrians for two years. In the late 19th and early 20th century, Štip was part of the Kosovo Vilayet of the Ottoman Empire.

=== 20th century ===
In 1912, at the start of the Balkan Wars, Štip and the surrounding area was occupied by Bulgaria. But Bulgaria's defeat, after it, dissatisfied with the result of the First Balkan War, attacked its former allies in 1913, which resulted in the annexation of all of Vardar Macedonia into the Kingdom of Serbia. Štip was occupied by Bulgaria and Germany during the First World War.

Events concerning the Kingdom of Serbia meant that Štip then became a part of the Kingdom of Serbs, Croats and Slovenes together with the rest of Vardar Macedonia.

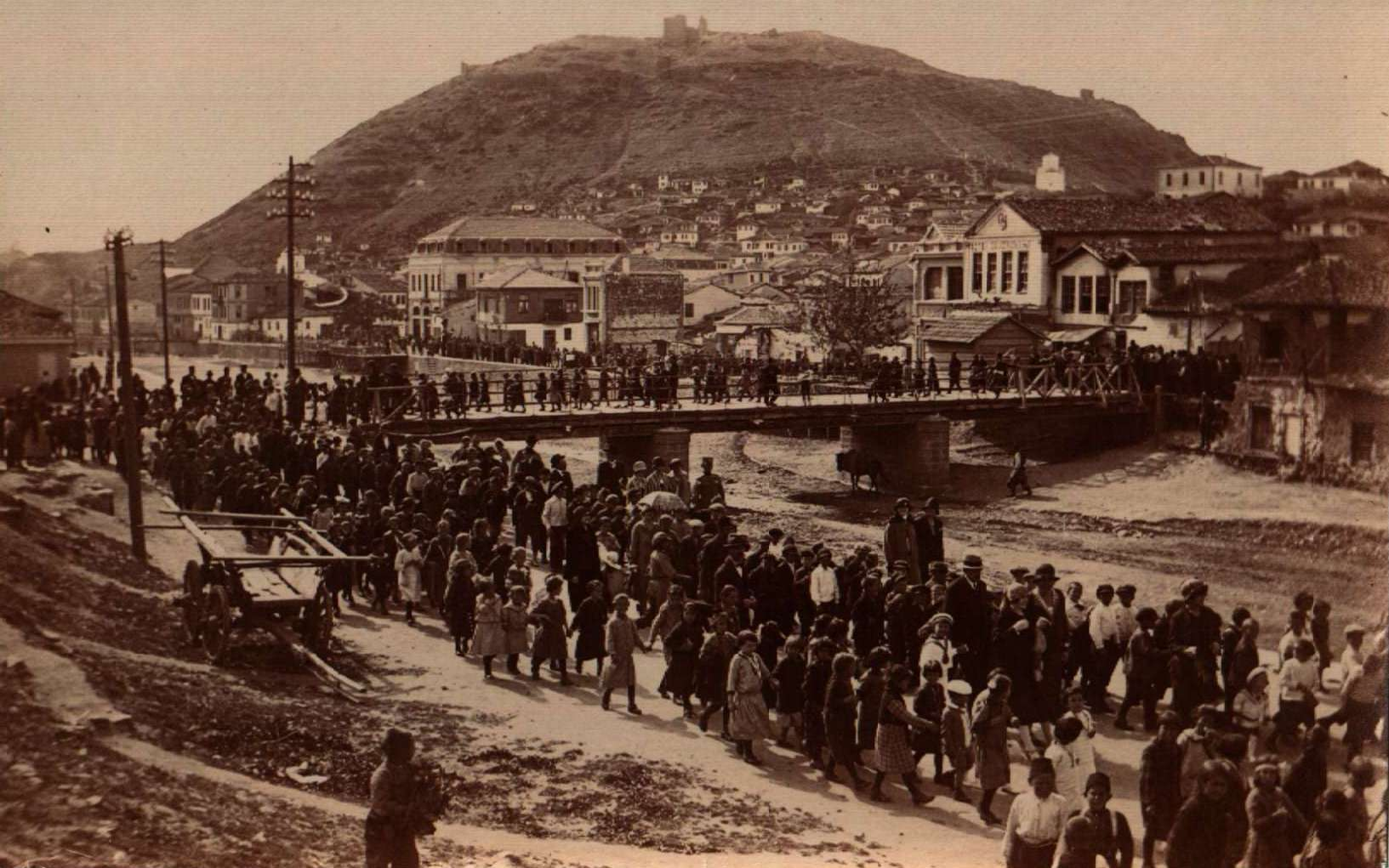
Štip in 1926.

From 1929 to 1941, Štip was part of the Vardar Banovina of the Kingdom of Yugoslavia.

On 6 April 1941, when Yugoslavia was attacked by Nazi Germany, the city was bombed by German planes which took off from Bulgaria. During the Second World War the Axis-allied Bulgarian forces occupied the city until early September, 1944, after which it was taken by German troops. Štip was retaken by the Macedonian National Liberation Army and the newly allied Bulgarian Army, now part of the anti-Axis coalition on 8 November 1944.

Thus, 8 November is celebrated as "Liberation Day" in the city of Štip and its broader municipality, and is a non-working holiday.

== Demographics ==
According to the National Census of 2002 the populations of Štip Municipality breaks down as follows:

Štip municipality	Total	Macedonians	Turks	Romani	Vlachs	Serbs	Albanians	Bosniaks	Others
Total	47796	41670	1272	2195	2074	294	12	11	265
Women	23876	20935	612	1039	981	153	4	6	146
Men	23920	20735	660	1156	1093	144	8	5	119
R.M. (%)	2.36	3.21	1.63	4.07	21.39	0.83	0	0.06	1.26

As of 2021, the city of Štip has 42.000 inhabitants and the ethnic composition was the following:

- Macedonians – 32.658
- Romani – 2.293
- Aromanians – 1.389
- Turks – 1.022
- Serbs – 163
- Albanians – 29
- Bosniaks – 12
- Others – 288
- Persons without data – 4.146

== Economy ==
Today, Štip is the center of North Macedonia's textile and fashion industry.

Formerly the home of such industrial giants in the former Yugoslavia like the cotton industry company "Makedonka" - Štip, with its enormous suburban campus, and the fashion industry brand "Astibo", from their ashes many private mini-factories were created, mostly by former managers in the socialist giants, which employ most of the women in town today, with fashion and textile still being the core skills of the city population, as maintained by the educational system.

Some of the larger private textile and fashion houses in Štip are:

- Albatros,
- Beas-S,
- Kit–Go Teks,
- Gracija,
- Modena,
- Mavis,
- Maksima,
- LARS,
- Linea,
- Briteks,
- Stipko,
- Stip-teks,
- Longurov,
- Vivendi,
- D&A,
- Amareta,
- Anateks,
- Angroteks,
- EAM,
- Milano,
- Vabo,
- Zogori,
- Metro Premier,
- Tekstil Invest-Denim,
- Tekstil Logistik and
- Eskada.

== Government ==
The current mayor of Štip is Ivan Jordanov (Macedonian: Иван Јорданов).

The city is ruled by the "City Council" which is elected every four years. The counselors are usually members of the strongest political parties. Every city council elects a president. The president of the city council leads the sessions and also signs the decisions together with city mayor.

== Transportation ==
The public transport is organized in suburban services and inter-city.

The suburbs of

- Babi,
- Senjak,
- Prebeg,
- Makedonka,
- Novo Selo and Kežovica, etc.

are served by a fleet of municipal buses running 7 days a week and connecting several locations in the city center with the suburbs.

The inter-city services are provided by the public transportation company "Stipion 2011" which has connections to all cities in North Macedonia as well as some neighboring countries.

The train station located in the northern suburb "Železnička" provides links to

- Kočani in the east, and
- Veles and Skopje to the west.

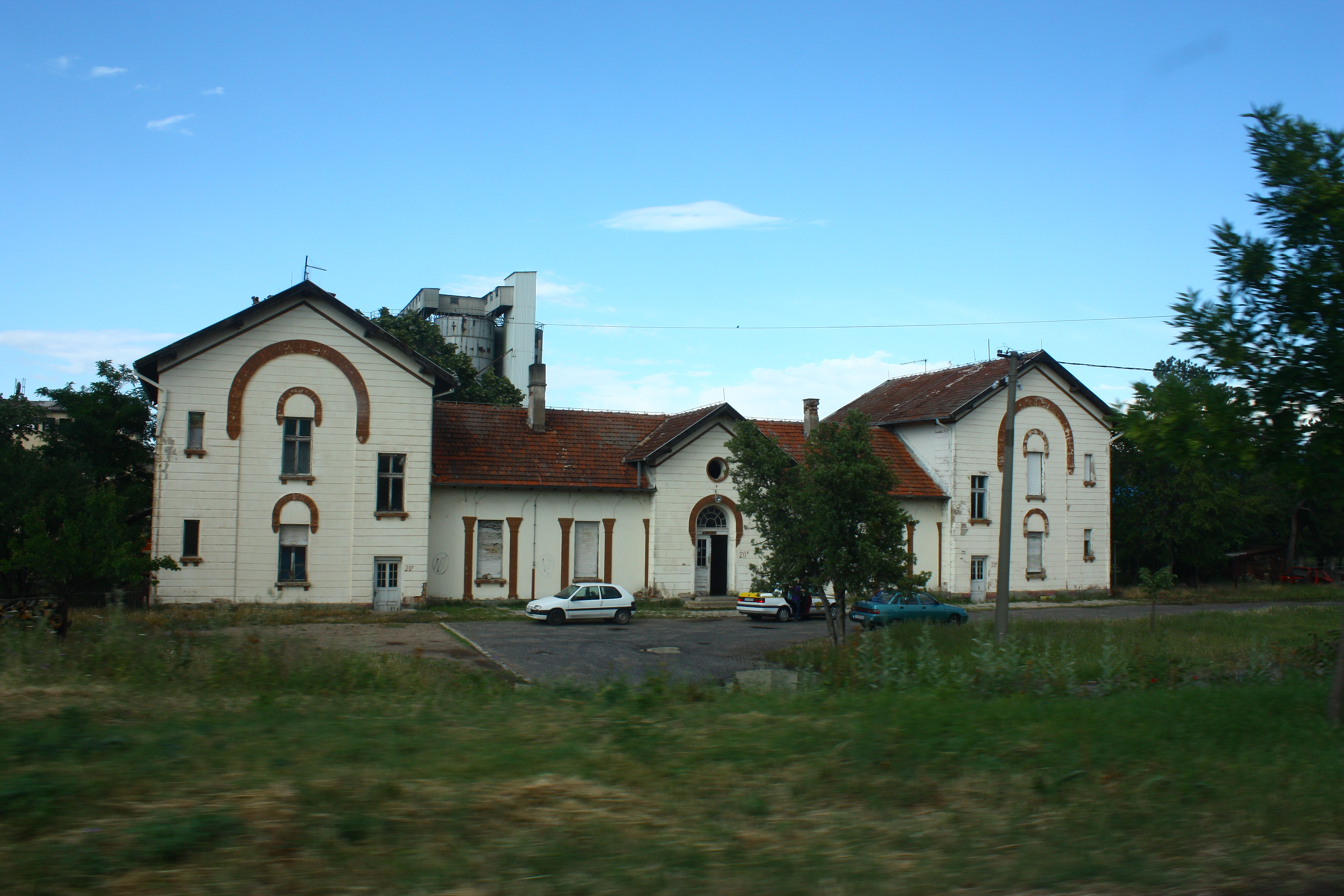
Štip railway station

There is a large fleet of private taxi vehicles in the city, with very competitive prices.

Štip can be reached by car through the M-5 highway (Štip-Kočani-Delčevo) in North Macedonia, and the connection to the E-75 Štip-Veles highway.

Travel direction in the region goes via the R-601 (Štip-Plačkovica) and R-526 routes that go through the city and connect to the M-5 freeway.

== Education ==
There are numerous pre-school, elementary/primary and middle school institutions in Štip and its municipal area.

There are five high/secondary schools, each somewhat specialized in a particular field, according to the educational policy of North Macedonia. The five high schools are as follows:

- Medical Secondary School "Jane Sandanski" (Macedonian: Државно средно медицинско училиште) - web site
- Music High School (Macedonian: Музички училишен образовен центар) - facebook page
- Textile Secondary School "Dimitar Mirasčiev" (Macedonian: Државно средно текстилно училиште „Димитар Мирашчиев“) - web site
- Secondary School for Children with Special Needs — Iskra - web site
- Electro-Technical Secondary School "Kole Nehtenin" (Macedonian: Државно средно електротехничко училиште) - web site
- Lyceum "Slavčo Stojmenski" (Macedonian: Државна гимназија „Славчо Стојменски“) - web site

The city is also the home of one of North Macedonia's four public universities, the Goce Delčev University of Štip.

The private music high school "Oksia" completes the list of educational institutions in the city.

== Architecture and sights ==
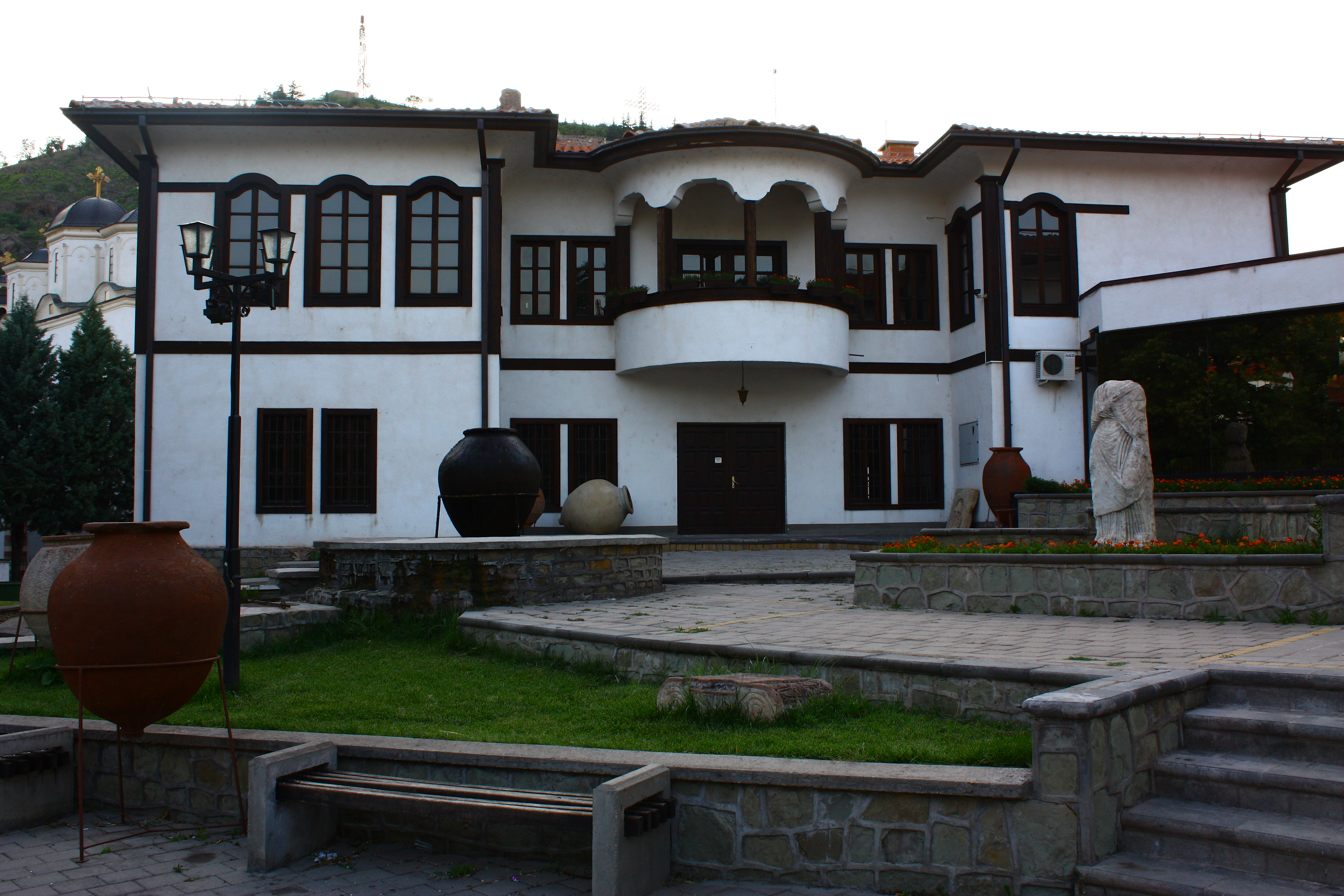
National Museum in Štip

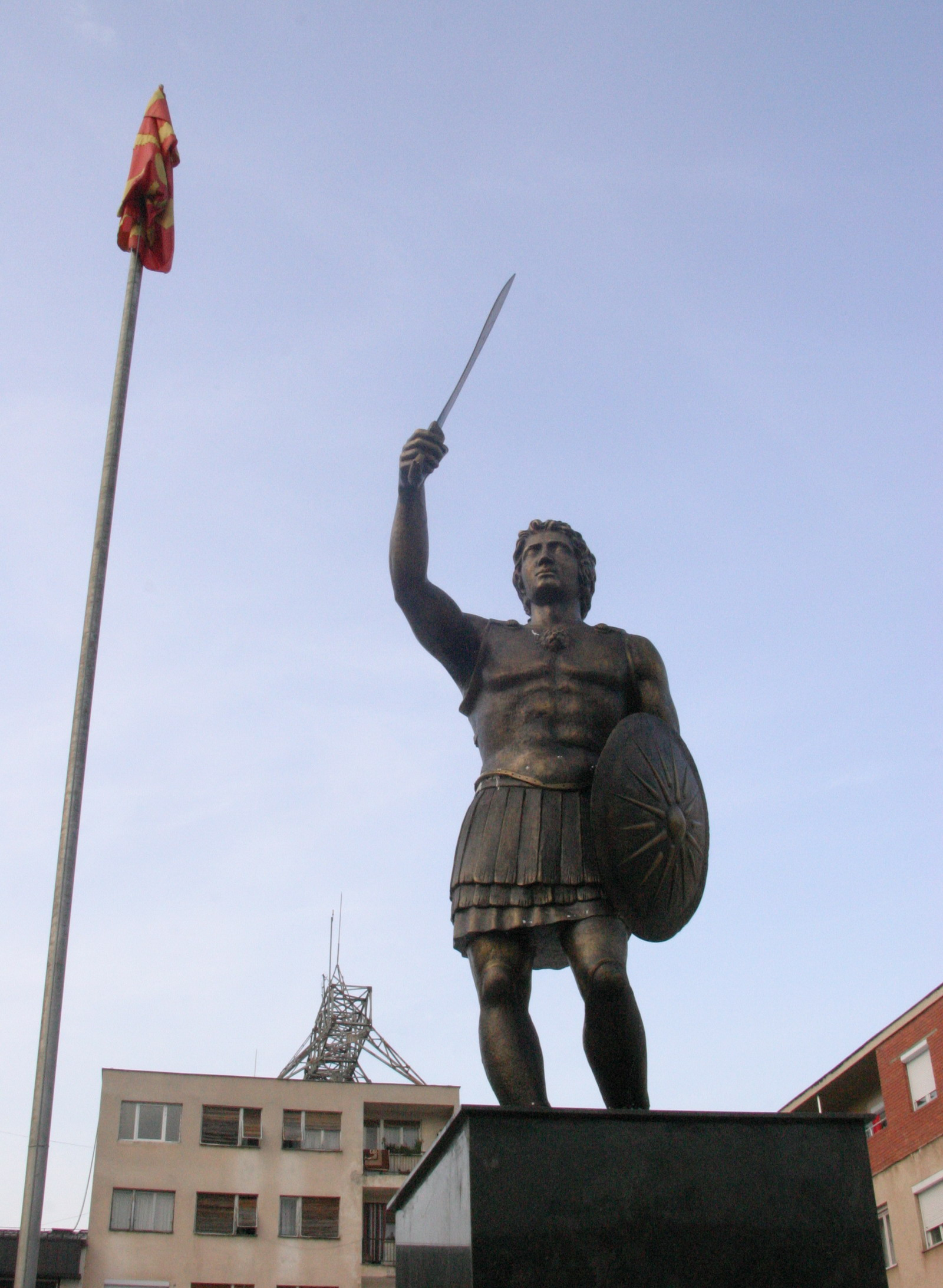
Statue of Alexander the Great in the City Square

Štip has a ruins of an old castle which keeps a watchful eye on the town from the Isar Hill.

In the town and its vicinity there are three 14th century-era churches, built in the time when the town was a part of medieval Serbia.

- The oldest one is the monastery church of St. Michael under Isar hill, built in 1332 by protosevast Hrelja who donated it to Chilandar, the Serbian monastery on Mount Athos.
- On the south slope of Isar stands a small church dedicated to St. John the Baptist built by nobleman Jovan Probištitović in 1350.
- A single nave church dedicated to the Ascension of Jesus (Sveti Spas) was built in 1369 by duke Dimitrije. In it one can still see original, 14th century frescoes as well as those from its reconstruction in 1601, done by master Jovan.

The Bezisten, a massive stone building which used to be an indoor bazaar (now an art gallery) is a remnant of the Ottoman influence in the city.

In the old parts of the town (and especially in Novo Selo), some houses built in the Ottoman style of architecture can still be found.

The town also boasts the healing powers of the Kežovica mineral spa and with the ruins of the ancient city of Bargala.

The ancient city of Bargala is located at the foot of the Plačkovica mountain. Nearby is the Kozjačka river and a small village called Kozjak. It is believed that the ruins found there belong to the ancient city. The town was built in the early 4th century, because there are some Roman documents found, containing information that the city gate of Bargala was built by Anthon Alipius, administrator of the province.

A statue of Alexander the Great was placed in the city's square in 2006.

== Arts and culture ==
Štip boasts the largest festival of pop music in North Macedonia, called MakFest. It has been held every November in the "Aco Šopov" cultural center for over two decades.

Another large cultural event in Štip is the "Štip Summer of Culture" (Macedonian: Штипско Културно Лето), which is a monthlong festival held from 1 July to 1 August, since 1987.

The first known opera performance in North Macedonia was staged in Štip in 1925.

In 2013 the Feast of the Holy Forty Martyrs was inscribed in UNESCO Intangible Cultural Heritage Lists of North Macedonia.

== Sports and recreation ==
Štip has four professional football teams,

- FK Bregalnica Štip which plays in the Macedonian First League,
- FK Babi which plays in the regional leagues,
- FK Astibo which play in the regional leagues and
- "Kežovica" which plays in the 3rd League East.
- Panda Basketball Academy

The town stadium in Štip, which also serves as FK Bregalnica's home ground, is the main stadium and it hosted the 2011–12 Macedonian Cup final.

RK Tekstilec is Štip's sole handball club and they play their home games at the sports hall of the Tošo Arsov Primary School.

== Media ==
Štip has many media establishments.

The first private television station in North Macedonia (and also in former Yugoslavia) "TEKO TV", was founded in Štip by Mr. Mile Kokotov in 1989. The channel is no longer operational.

The other currently operational local TV stations are:

- "TV IRIS" and
- "TV STAR".

Important radio stations are

- "Kanal 77", one of the most popular Macedonian radio stations,
- "Radio Štip" (Macedonian: Радио Штип) and
- the Roma language radio station "Radio Cherenja" (Macedonian: Радио Черења).

The local newspaper is called "Štipski Vesnik" (Macedonian: Штипски Весник).

== Notable people ==
About the wedding customs in Štip
Excerpt of speech by a woman from Štip speaking in the local Štip – Kočani dialect about the local wedding customs

- Ivan Mihaylov, the last leader of IMRO
- Todor Aleksandrov, leader of IMRO after WWI
- Mihajlo Apostolski, the first commander of the Army of People's Republic of Macedonia
- Ljubčo Georgievski, Prime Minister of the Republic of Macedonia from 1998 to 2002
- Kiro Gligorov, first president of the Republic of Macedonia
- Ljupčo Jordanovski, former acting president of the Republic of Macedonia
- Nikola Kljusev, first Prime Minister of the independent Republic of Macedonia
- Lyubomir Miletich, Bulgarian linguist, ethnographer, dialectologist and historian
- Bojan Miovski, footballer
- Ferus Mustafov, Romani musician
- Nataša Petrović, actress of Serbian descent
- Dragoslav Šekularac, a former-Yugoslav football legend
- Aco Šopov, poet
- Kiril Efremov, artist and painter, former president of DLUM
- Zoran Vanev, pop-folk singer
- Gabriel Athonite, monk, ascetic and bishop

== Twin towns ==
Štip is twinned with Split, Croatia, and Balıkesir, Turkey.

== Bibliography ==
- Ismajli, Rexhep (2015). Eqrem Basha (ed.). Studime për historinë e shqipes në kontekst ballkanik [Studies on the History of Albanian in the Balkan context] (PDF) (in Albanian). Prishtinë: Kosova Academy of Sciences and Arts, special editions CLII, Section of Linguistics and Literature.
- Prendergast, Eric Heath (2017). The Origin and Spread of Locative Determiner Omission in the Balkan Linguistic Area (Thesis). UC Berkeley.
