= Church of St. Michael, Štip =

Church building in Štip, North Macedonia

Coordinates: 41.7389°N 22.1881°E

Church of St. Michael (Macedonian Cyrillic: Свети Архангел Михаил), also called Fitija (Фитија) is the most valuable medieval monument of Štip, North Macedonia.

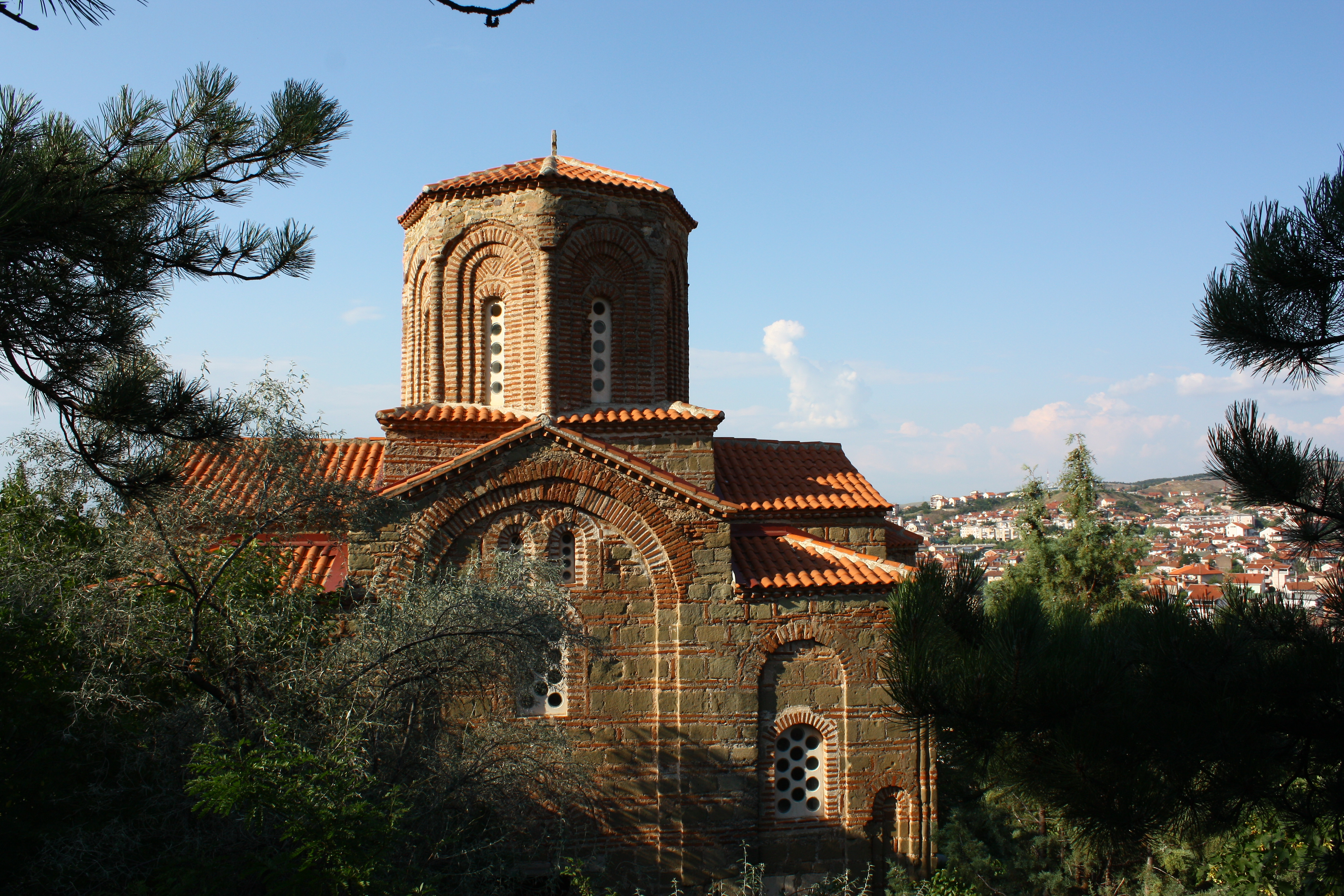
St Michael's in Štip

The church was built as the central feature of a monastery in 1332. Its endower was protosebastos Hrelja, a nobleman of Serbian kingdom that ruled Štip since 1282. It is located next to the road linking the suburb with the castle Isar. In 1334 Hrelja, with consent of king Stefan Dušan, donated the church to Chilandar, the Serbian monastery in Holy Mount Athos. The donation was confirmed in 1381 by the new lord of Štip Konstantin Dejanović with a charter.

In Ottoman times the church was turned into a mosque and lost its frescoes.

St Michael has a cross-in-rectangle base with a dome above it. The outer decoration shows all the signs of fine Byzantine architecture with facades in layers of bricks and stone.

Today the church is just a chapel (paraklis). Until recently it had an old iconostasis with icons by Georgi Zoografski but in 2000 it got a new, marble one, painted by Pero of Skopje.
