= TEKO TV =

Yugoslavian television station

TEKO TV (ТЕКО ТВ) was the first private television station in Yugoslavia, founded in 1989 in Štip (now Macedonia) by Mile Kokotov and Petar Varadinov.

In 1990, at the request of Kiro Gligorov, himself from Štip, the station took an active role in the promotion in favor of the independence of Macedonia, which was held successfully on 8 September. After the success of TEKO TV's experimental broadcasts, many private television stations opened in the country.
