= Medical School SOU Jane Sandanski – Štip =

Medical School SOU "Jane Sandanski"
- Štip; North Macedonia

Information
- Type: Public secondary school
- Established: 1956
- Grades: 1 – 4 year
- Enrollment: ~1000
- Nickname: Medical School
- Website: http://janesandanski.schools.edu.mk

Medical School "Jane Sandanski" (in Macedonian: Медицинско училиште СОУ "Јане Сандански", is a medical secondary school in Štip, North Macedonia. It was established in 1956 and named after the revolutionary Jane Sandanski. The school educate students from year 1 to year 4 (15–18 years students).

== History of the school ==
The school was founded with decision of the Municipality Council of Štip N#1256 on 9 September 1956 as secondary school for nurses and midwives. It was based in the building of the old midwife's school which was founded in 1944 and worked as a one-year school until 1948, eventually till the end of 1950. In the school year 1950/1951 the two-year midwife's school was established and it worked till the end of the school year 1957/1958 when it was replaced with the Secondary medical school created only for nurses. The opening of this school justified the main aim - the nurses of the school were supposed to take care of the patients in the medical center and the medical institutions. The secondary medical school used to have its boarding house and students from different towns in North Macedonia. The first school principal was Hristina Spiridonova, who was at that time the ex-principal of the midwife's school. She made all the preparations for the school opening. The first instructor was Blaga Beleva, a nurse from Štip. This school aroused a great interest among people. The lectures were held at the premises of the old midwife's school and the boarding school was placed in the old building of the gymnasium. The teachers were engaged only on a limited contractual basis and paid an hourly wage, as opposed to permanent positions and monthly wages, as was the norm at the time.

== Programs ==
Students enrolled in the school choose one of these programs:

- Nursing
- Gynecology/Obstetric Nursing
- Dental technician
- Pharmacy technician
- Physiotherapy Technician

== See also ==
- Education in North Macedonia
- Štip
- North Macedonia
