= Kožle =

Kožle Кожле Kozhlë
- Village
- Location within North Macedonia
- Coordinates: 41°50′N 21°41′E
- Country: North Macedonia
- Region: Skopje
- Municipality: Petrovec

Population (2021)
  - Total: 5
- Time zone: UTC+1 (CET)
  - Summer (DST): UTC+2 (CEST)
- Car plates: SK

Kožle (Macedonian: Кожле, Albanian: Kozhlë) is a village in the municipality of Petrovec, North Macedonia.

== Demographics ==
The Yugoslav census of 1953 recorded 309 people of whom 304 were Macedonians and 5 others. The 1961 Yugoslav census recorded 196 people of whom were 189 Maceidonians and 7 others. The 1971 census recorded 130 people of whom 87 were Macedonians, 12 Albanians and 31 others. The 1981 Yugoslav census recorded 70 people of whom 35 were Macedonians, 32 Albanians and 3 others. The Macedonian census of 1994 recorded 13 people of whom 7 were Macedonians, 4 Albanians and 2 others. According to the 2002 census, the village had a total of 14 inhabitants, of whom 10 were Macedonians, 2 Albanians, 1 Serb and 1 other. In 2021, the village had 5 inhabitants. Ethnic groups in the village include:

- Persons for whom data are taken from administrative sources 4
- Albanians 1
