= Sotir Atanasov =

Bulgarian army officer (1876–1940)

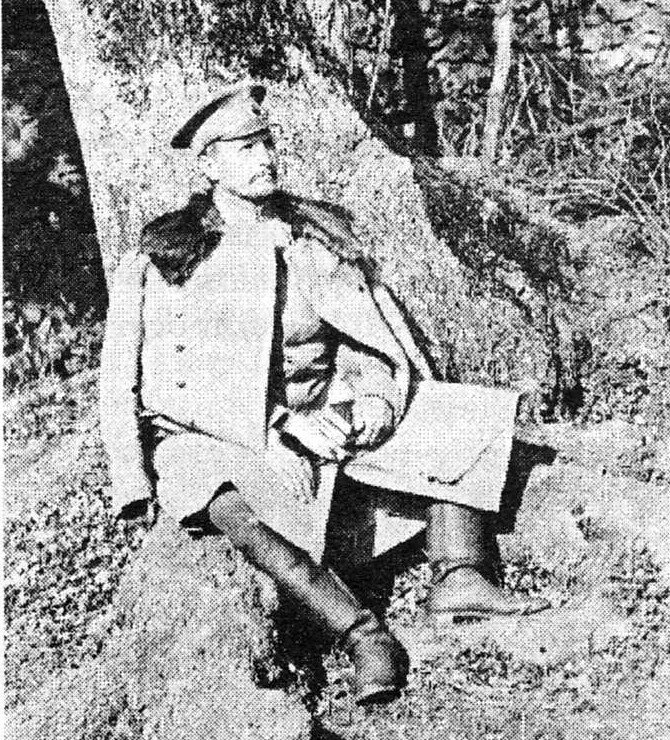
Atanasov during WWI.

Sotir Atanasov Yanakiev was a Bulgarian Army officer, revolutionary and voivode of the Supreme Macedonian-Adrianople Committee.

== Biography ==
Atanasov was born on March 30, 1876, in the village of Klisura, then in the Ottoman Macedonia, today in Bulgaria. In 1899 he graduated from the Military School in Sofia and was promoted to the rank of lieutenant in the artillery. Atanasov left the army later and devoted himself to revolutionary activity. He became a vojvode of a detachment of the Supreme Committee, active in the areas of Kochani, Kratovo and Shtip from 1902 to 1903. Afterwards he returned to service in the Shumen garrison, but on the recommendation of Boris Sarafov in 1904, he retired to Ottoman Macedonia and went to Nevrokop area, at the head of a new detachment. Later he returned to Bulgaria again. During the Balkan Wars Atanasov was a commander of the 5th Edirne Company of the Macedonian-Adrianopolitan Volunteer Corps, and during the First World War he was a company commander in the 11th Macedonian Infantry Division. Atanasov was dismissed from military service in 1919. Colonel Sotir Atanasov died on September 7, 1940, in the village of Drazhintsi, Belogradchik region.
