= Macedonian-Adrianople Social Democratic Group =

Macedonian-Adrianople Social Democratic Group Македонско-одринска социјалдемократска група
- Founder: Vasil Glavinov
- Founded: 1896
- Dissolved: 1912
- Newspaper: Political Liberty
- Ideology: Socialism; Macedonian nationalism Anti-imperialism; Balkan federalism
- Political position: Left-wing
- Regional affiliation: Bulgarian Workers' Social Democratic Party
- Slogan: Македонија за Македонците (Macedonia for the Macedonians)

The Macedonian-Adrianople Social Democratic Group was a regional faction of the Bulgarian Workers' Social Democratic Party in the Ottoman Empire. According to Macedonian historians, most of its activists were ethnic Macedonians.

== History ==
=== Creation and development ===
In 1894, on the instructions of Dimitar Blagoev, Vasil Glavinov founded the first socialist group in Ottoman Macedonia in Veles. In 1896 Glavinov founded the Macedonian-Adrianople Social Democratic Group itself. Other notable members of the group were Dimo Hadjidimov, Velko Markov, Atanas Razdolov, Dimitar Miraschiev, Nikola Karev, Nikola Rusinski, etc. Raising slogans such as "Macedonia for the Macedonians", and "Autonomy for Macedonia and Adrianople regions", they managed to create socialist groups and circles in some cities in Macedonia and Adrianople Thrace. They published the newspaper Political Liberty (Политическа свобода) and accepted the idea of an armed revolution, but criticized the Internal Macedonian Revolutionary Organization (IMRO) for "excessive centralization and insufficient ideological resilience."

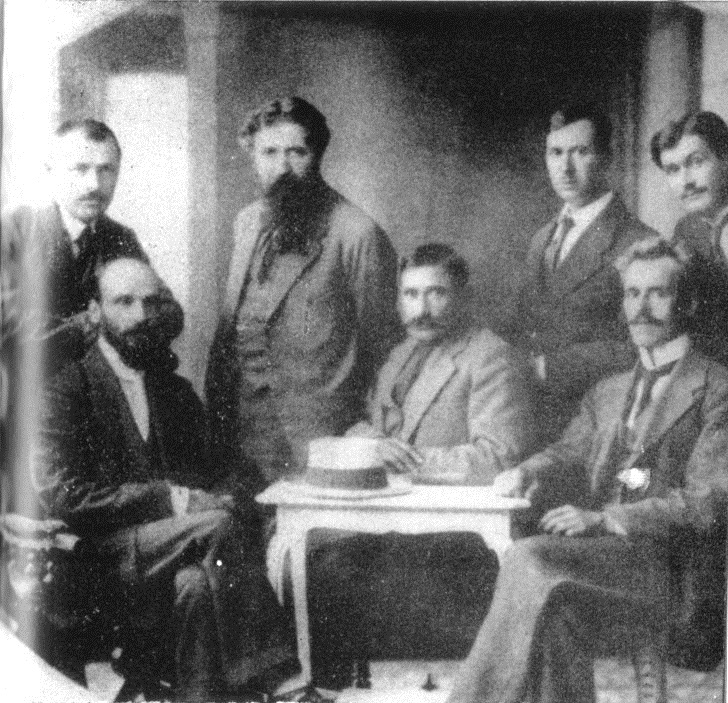
Vasil Glavinov (standing second from left) with IMRO members, among them is Dimo Hadjidimov (sitting from the left).

Finally the group established contacts with the IMRO and participated in the first socialist conference on July 3, 1900, held in Krushevo. Unable to reach the mass they desired, the Socialists decided to join the IMRO, but under certain conditions: autonomy within the Organization; freedom of socialist agitation; participation by right of one of their representatives in each district committee of IMRO. These conditions were accepted only by the Bitola revolutionary district, and the socialist Nikola Karev became the Krushevo district voivode and took an active part in the Ilinden Uprising in 1903. After the failure of the uprising there was discord both in the IMRO and in the BWSDP itself. After the Young Turk Revolution in 1908, the Marxist Bulgarian Social Democratic Workers' Party (Narrow Socialists) sympathized with the Bulgarian People's Federative Party and created its social democratic groups and trade unions in Macedonia and Adrianople Thrace. At the end of July 1908, Vasil Glavinov left from Bulgaria for the Ottoman Empire and toured Edirne, Alexandroupolron, Serres, Kommotini, Xanthi, Drama and settled in Thessaloniki. At a meeting of the group on August 10, 1908, at which Dimitar Blagoev and Georgi Kirkov presented reports, the program of the group was discussed and adopted, which included demands for self-determination of the nationalities in the Ottoman Empire, general, direct, equal and secret suffrage, abolition of the Ottoman Senate, the introduction of a progressive income tax, the replacement of the regular army with a people's militia, reforms in labor legislation, and others. At the end of 1910, a conference was held in Thessaloniki to establish an Ottoman Socialist Party, but attempts failed without much success.

After the beginning of the Balkan Wars (1912-1913) the members of the faction moved to Sofia, where the group was practically dissolved.

=== Views and concept ===
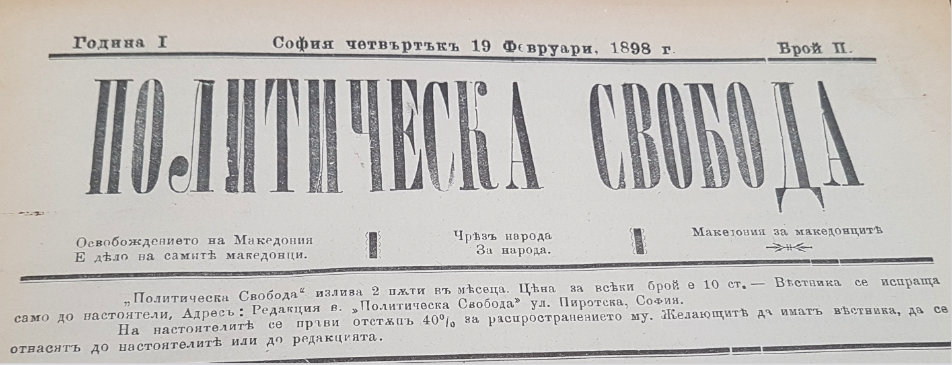
The front cover of the Political Liberty newspaper.

The idea of a self-governing Macedonia (and Adrianople) regions was emphasized in the program of these socialists and their agenda was made more explicit in their newspaper Political Liberty. The newspaper criticized the Bulgarian chauvinist government for its ambitions at territorial expansion in both areas and appealed for the creation of an independent Balkan Socialist Federation, and conceived it as some kind of “Switzerland of the Balkans”. It would have a presumed cantonal organization separate for all local national elements, which would choose free their official language. Per Political Liberty, the Macedonians should not be regarded as Bulgarians, Serbs, Greeks etc., but primarily as “slaves”. Its political agenda of a separate Macedonian people was based on Marxist class-ideological aspects, with a strong anti-nationalist motivation. Such socialist rhetoric, with specific and distinct political tasks of the Macedonian people, uniting in this designation not only “Bulgarians” but a number of other “nationalities”, reveals that then socialist “national” categories were quite distinct from today's separate Macedonian and Bulgarian national concepts. The idea of establishing a multinational autonomous Macedonian entity and promoting an inclusive Macedonian identity, was a supranational concept, not a national one.

While Bulgarian historians today criticize such a "nihilistic" position, their Macedonian colleagues are worried that the group was blind for Macedonians' separate ethnic identity.

== See also ==
- Strandzha Commune
- Krusevo Republic
- Macedonian Secret Revolutionary Committee
- Socialist Workers' Federation
