= Pobožje =

Pobožje Побожје
- Village
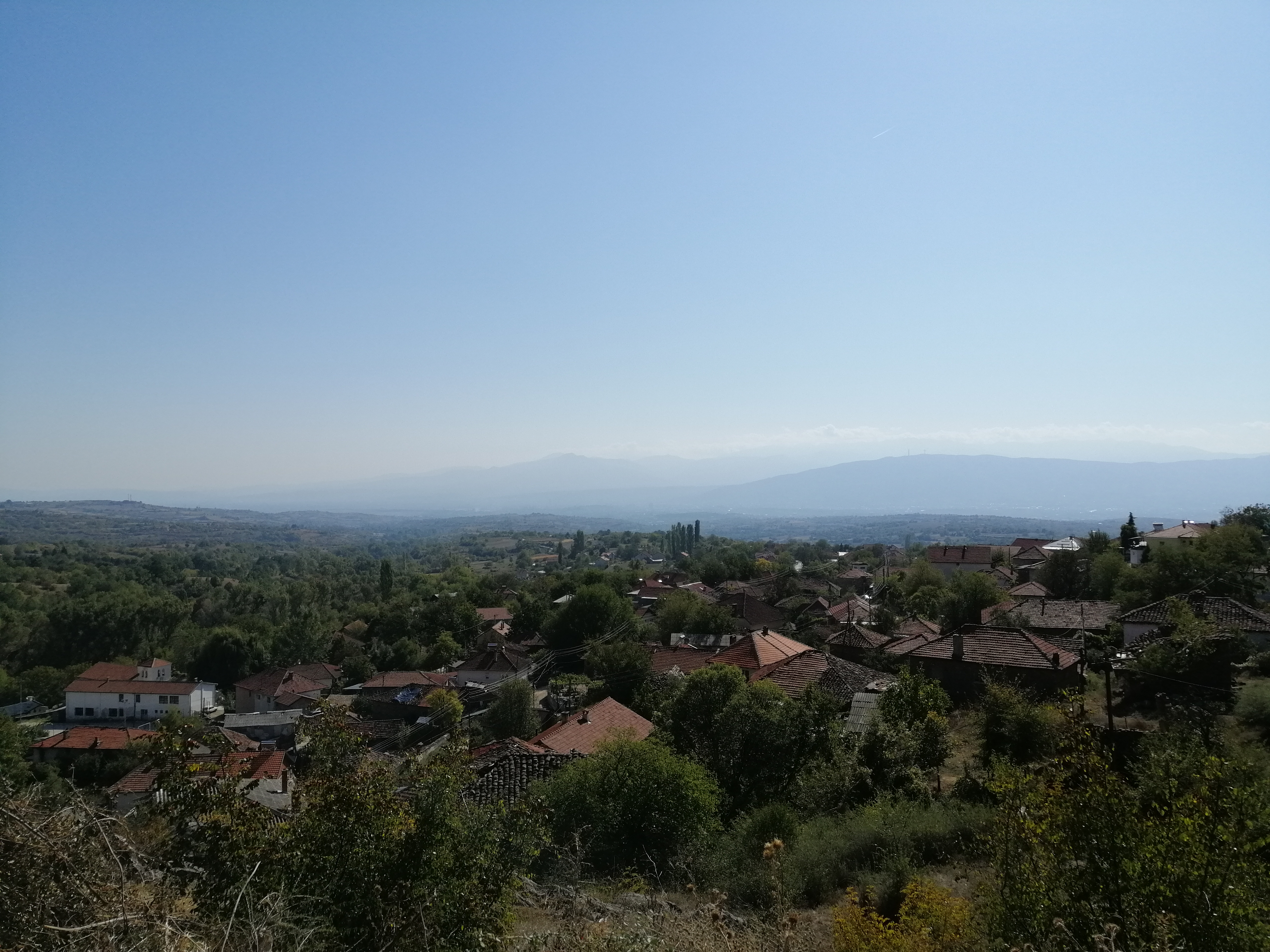

- Location within North Macedonia
- Coordinates: 42.113350°N 21.426069°E
- Country: North Macedonia
- Region: Skopje
- Municipality: Čučer-Sandevo

Population (2021)
  - Total: 710
- Time zone: UTC+1 (CET)
  - Summer (DST): UTC+2 (CEST)
- Website: .

Pobožje (Macedonian: Побожје) is a village in the municipality of Čučer-Sandevo, North Macedonia.

== Demographics ==
As of the 2021 census, Pobožje had 710 residents with the following ethnic composition:

- Macedonians 551
- Serbs 112
- Persons for whom data are taken from administrative sources 42
- Others 5

According to the 2002 census, the village had a total of 591 inhabitants. Ethnic groups in the village include:

- Macedonians 423
- Serbs 166
- Others 2
