= Kruševo =

Town in Pelagonia, North Macedonia

Kruševo Крушево (Macedonian) Crushuva (Aromanian)
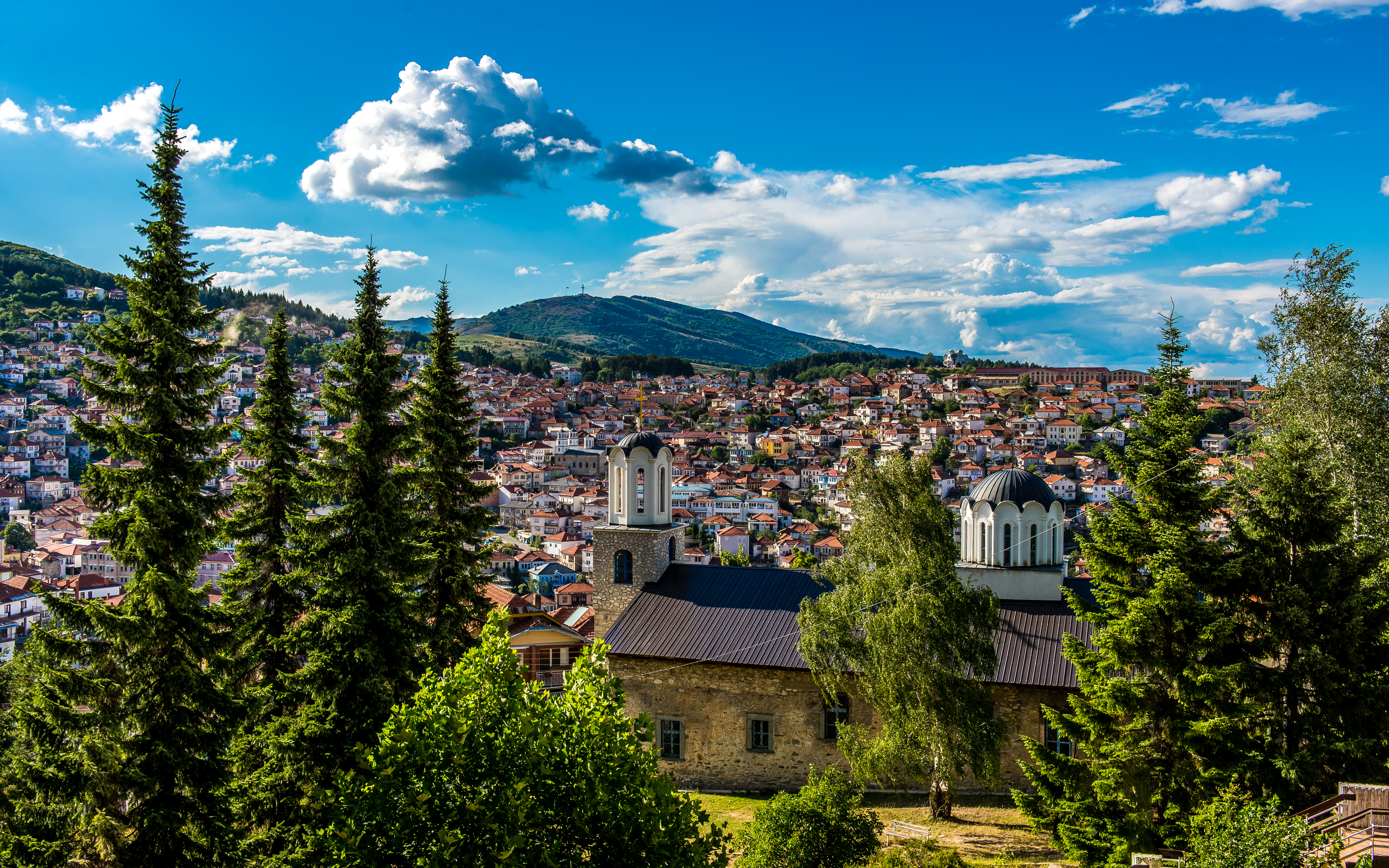
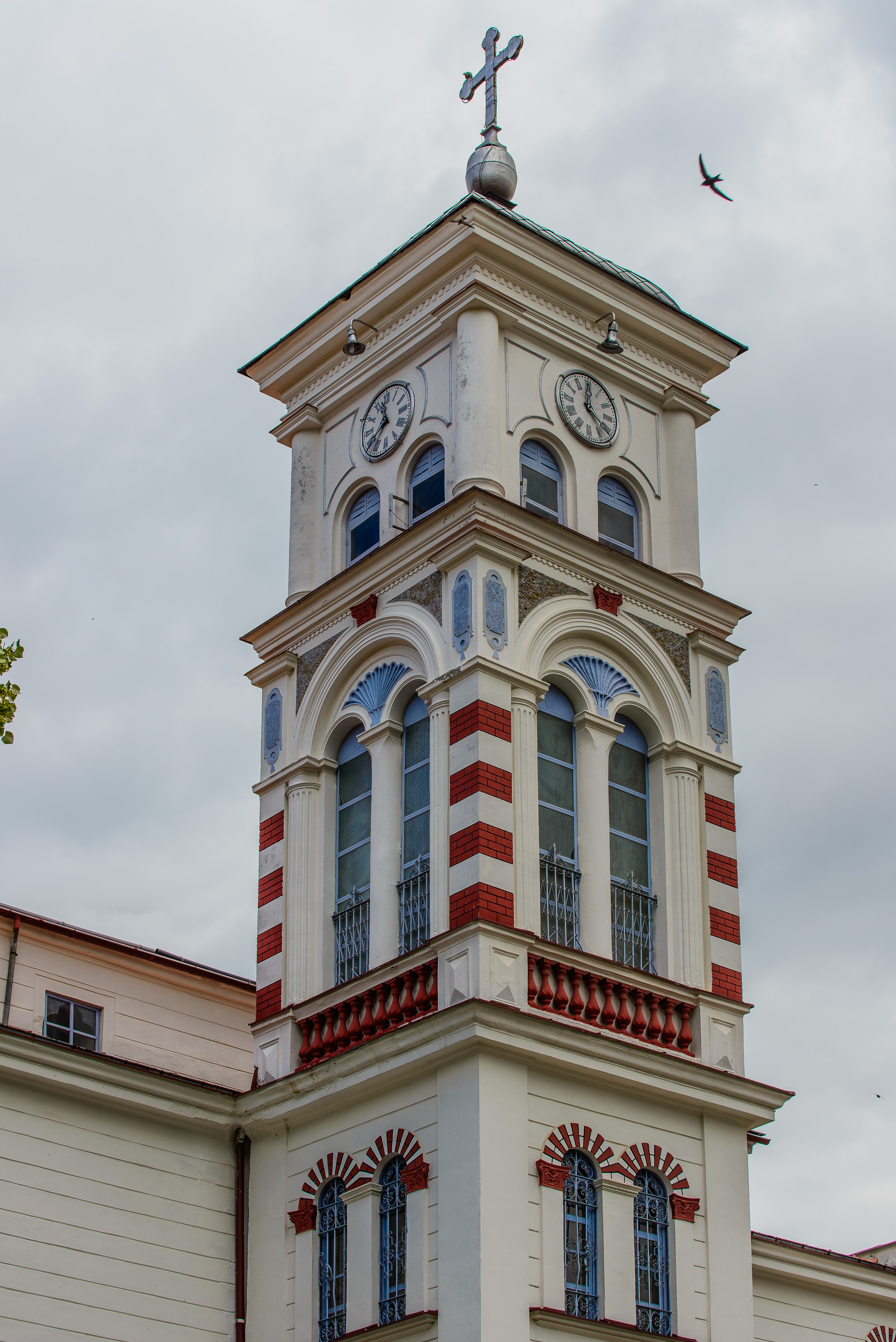
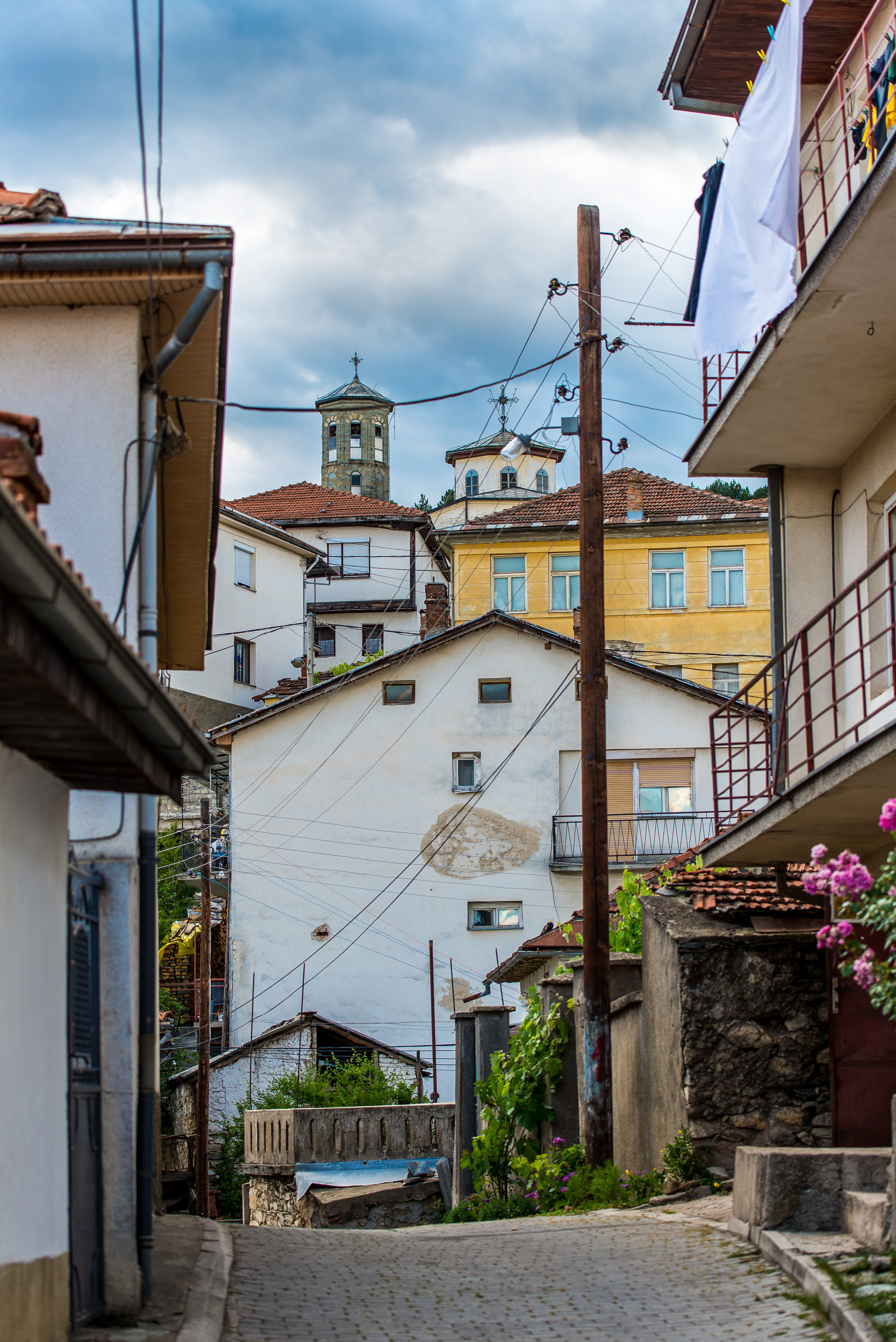
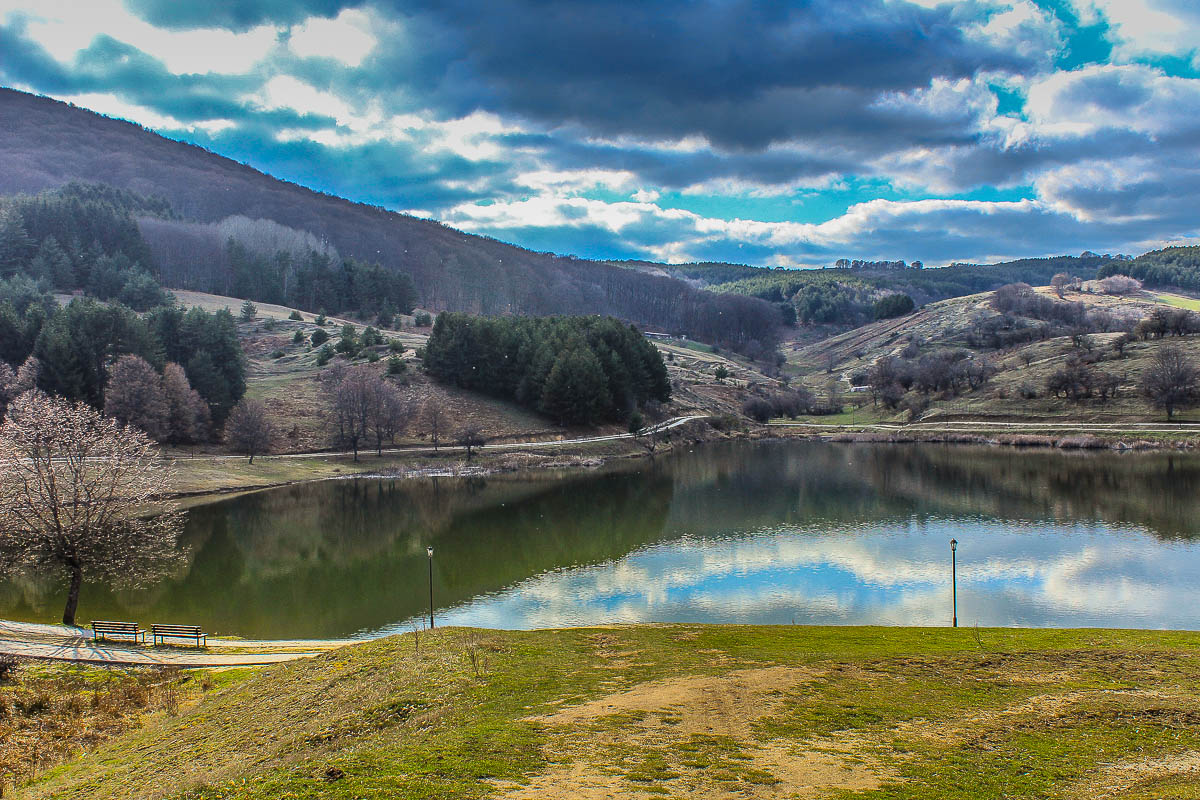
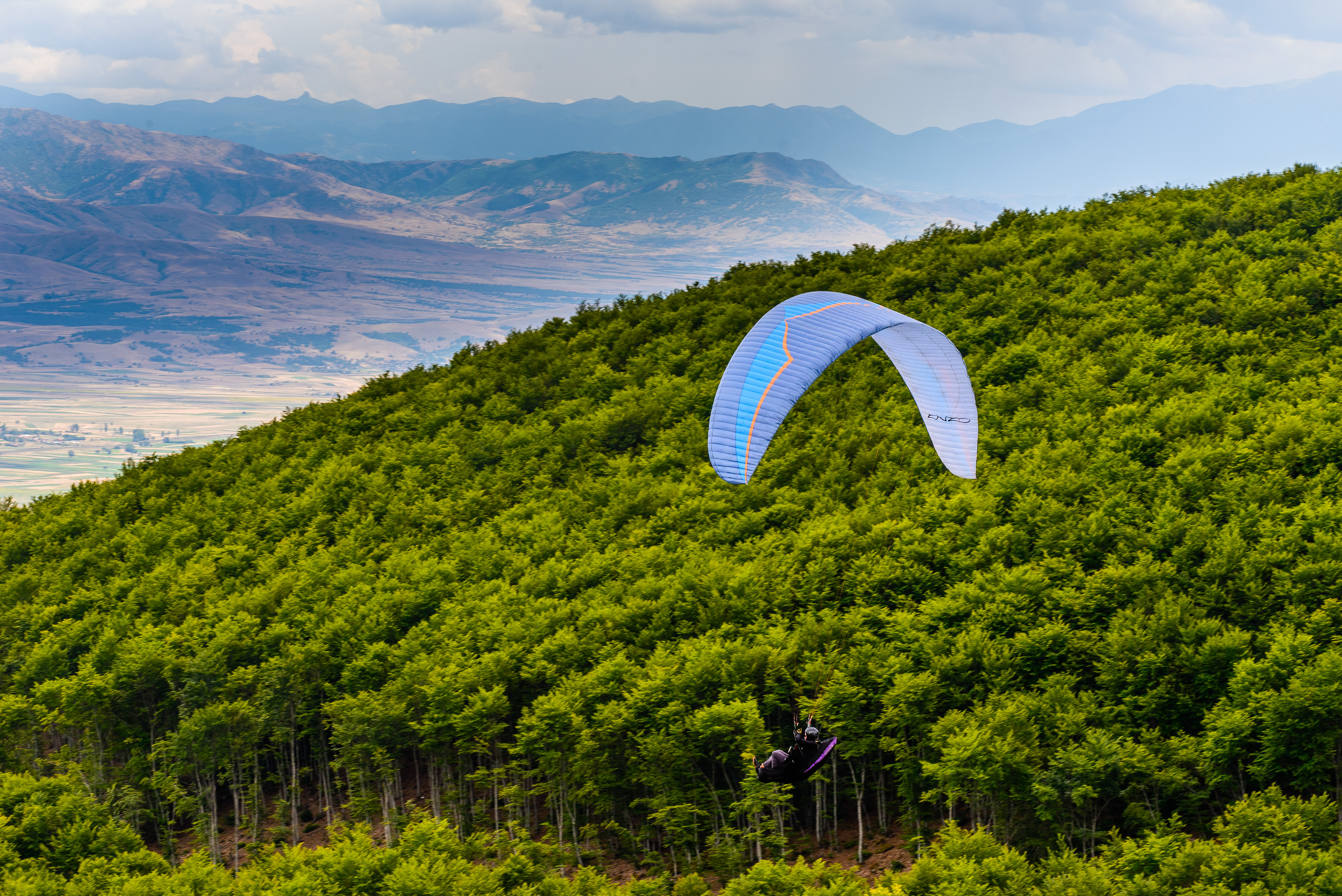
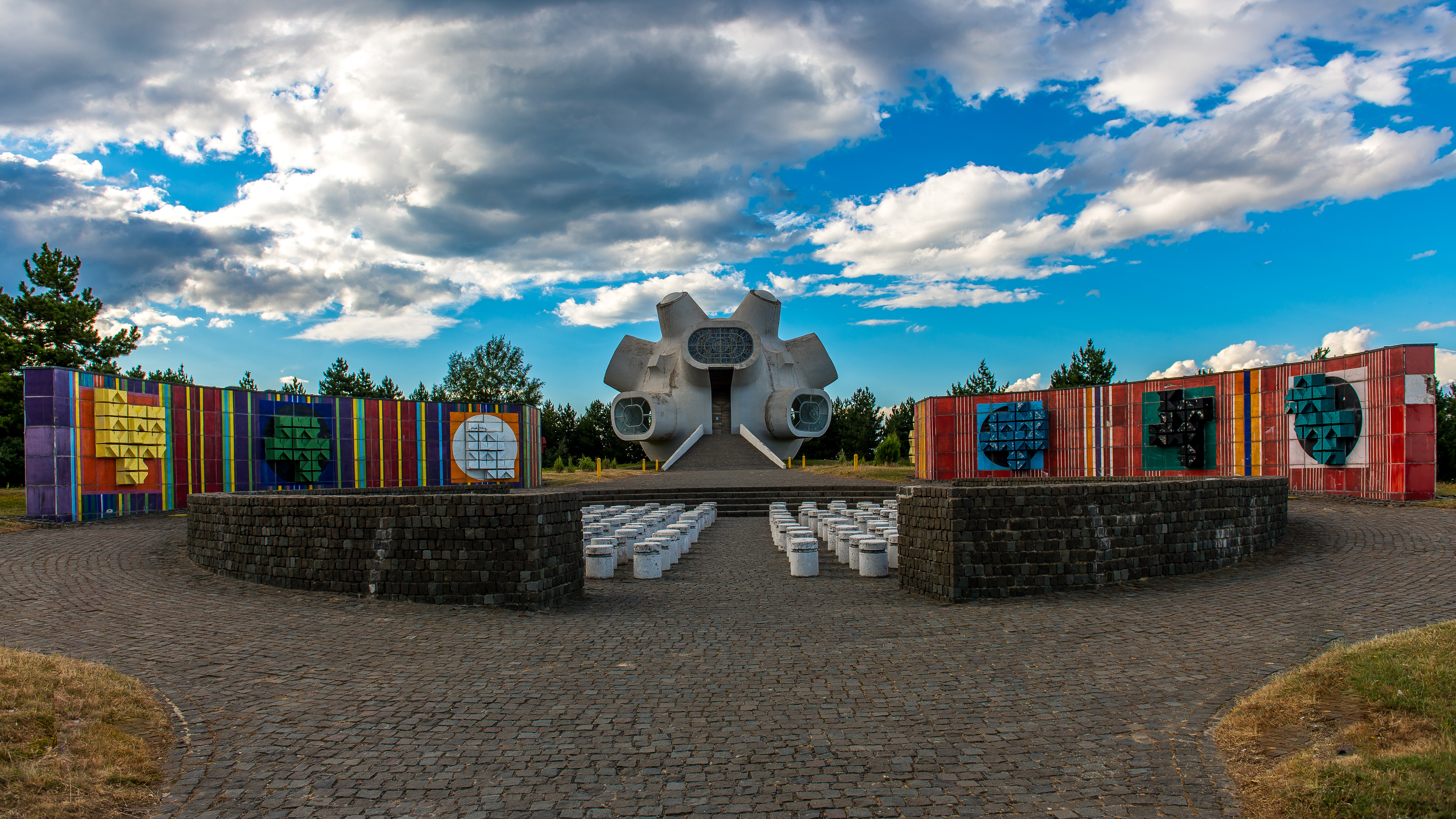
- Northern vista; St. Nicholas Church; a common street; southeastern vista; paragliding championship; Makedonium Monument

- Flag Coat of arms

- Location within North Macedonia
- Coordinates: 41°22′12″N 21°14′54″E
- Country: North Macedonia
- Region: Pelagonia
- Municipality: Kruševo

Government
  - Mayor: Tome Hristoski (SDSM)
- Elevation: 1,350 m (4,430 ft)

Population (2021)
  - Total: 4,104
- Time zone: UTC+1 (CET)
  - Summer (DST): UTC+2 (CEST)
- Postal code: 7550
- Area code: +389/48/47X-XXX
- Vehicle registration: KS
- Climate: Cfb

Kruševo (Macedonian: Крушево [ˈkruʃɛvɔ]; Aromanian: Crushuva) is a town in North Macedonia. In Macedonian, the name means the 'place of pear trees'. It is the highest town in the country and one of the highest in the Balkans, situated at an altitude of over 1,350 metres (4,430 ft) above sea level. The town is the seat of Kruševo Municipality. It is located in the western part of the country, overlooking the region of Pelagonia, 33 kilometres (21 mi) and 53 kilometres (33 mi) from the nearby cities of Prilep and Bitola, respectively.

== Etymology ==
The name "Kruševo" stems from the Slavic word for "pear", variants of which include gruša and kruša.

== History ==
=== Middle Ages ===
Initially part of the Byzantine Empire, the area of present-day Kruševo was conquered by the First Bulgarian Empire in the 9th century and subsequently reconquered by the Byzantines in the 11th century. It then feel under short-lived, 14th-century Lordship of Prilep, before coming under Ottoman Turkish rule in 1395.

=== Ottoman rule ===
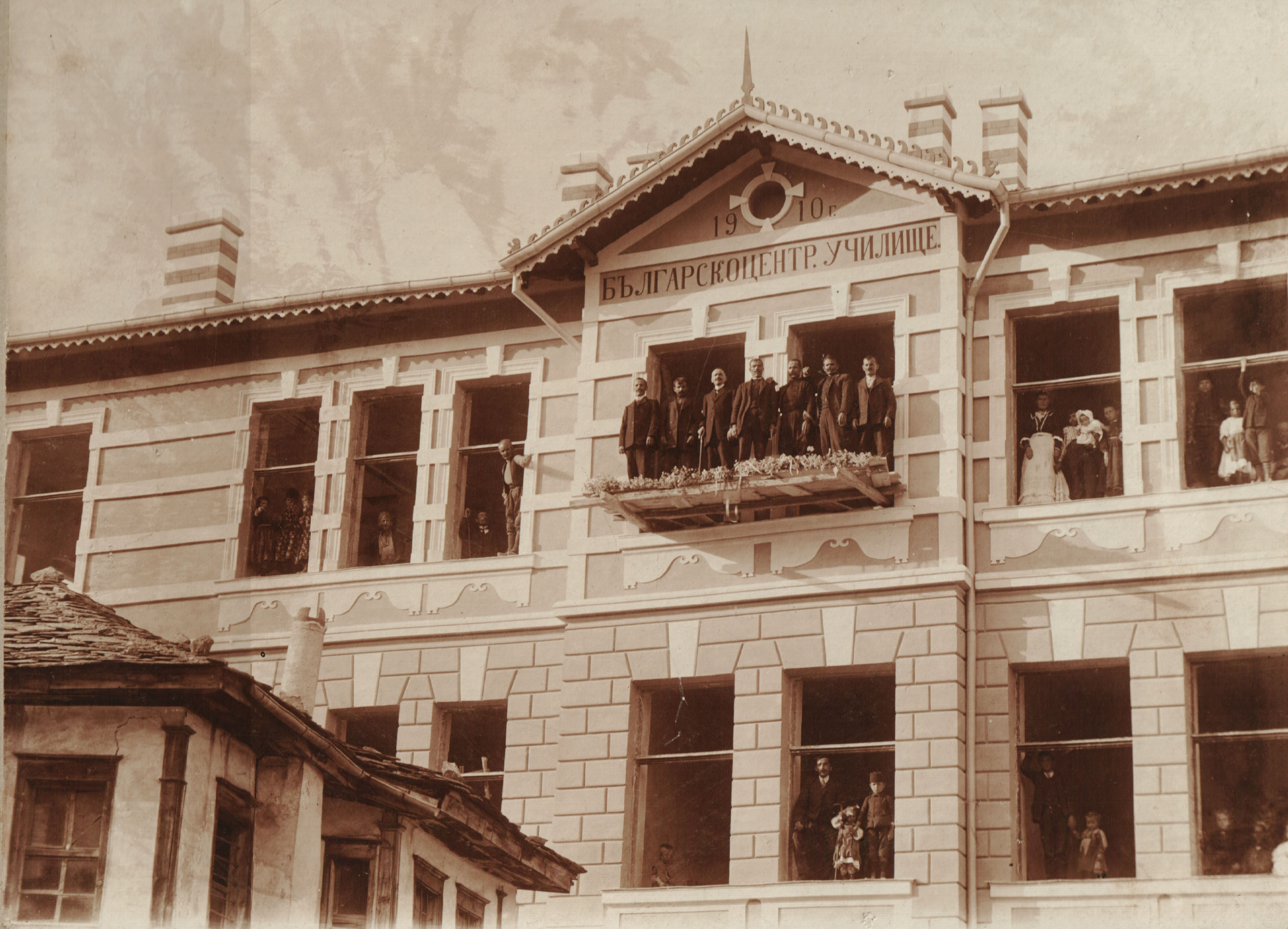
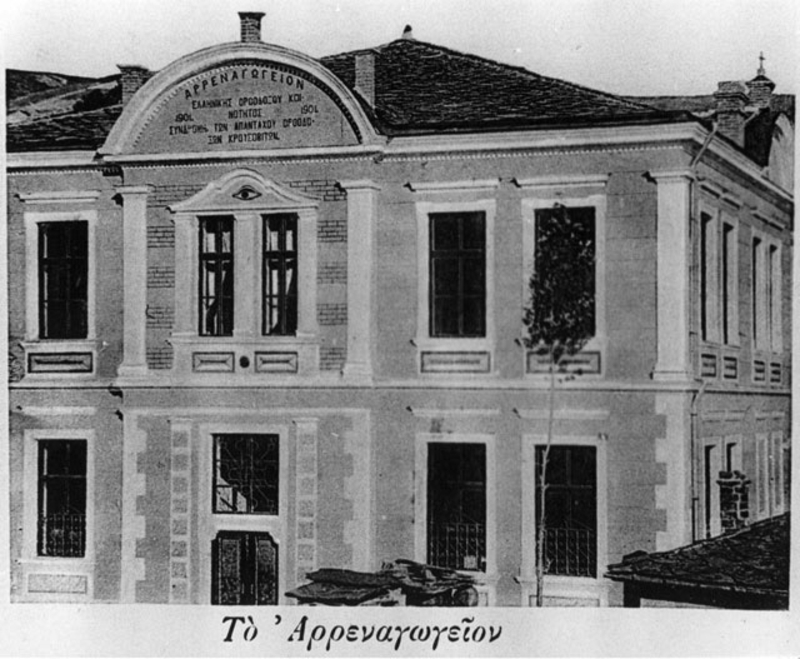
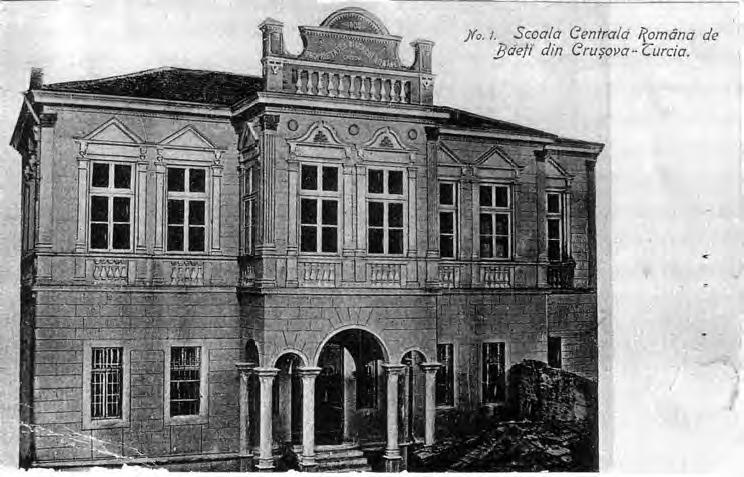
The schools of the three ethno-religious communities in Kruševo recognized by Ottoman authorities: Bulgarian (top), Greek (middle), and Aromanian.

A large part of the Macedonian population in Kruševo originate from Lazaropole and descend from Mijaks, a Macedonian subgroup who settled in the town alongside Aromanians by the middle of the eighteenth century. Aromanians settled in Kruševo along with Orthodox Albanian refugees, often in groups of families and led by a priest, fleeing the 18th-century sociopolitical and economic crises in present-day southern Albania. Orthodox Albanians arrived from Vithkuq and the Opar region, while local Kruševo traditions also relate that other families arrived from Korçë and the villages of Polenë, Dardhë, and Mborje.

In the 19th century, Kruševo grew as a commercial center, with connections throughout the Balkans and beyond. Local merchants such as the Nitsiotas brothers and five other companies were active in Vienna. Orthodox Albanians from Moscopole founded the so-called Ohtul di Arbinesh ("hill of the Albanians") neighborhood. This community would soon assimilate into the Aromanian population of the city. In the 1860s, a Bulgarian municipality and school were established in the town. Subsequently, a Bulgarian girls' school was also opened, and it operated simultaneously with the Greek schools in the town. A Romanian school opened its doors in Kruševo in 1876. In the early 20th century, Kruševo was a small town in Manastir Vilayet, with a mixed population of 4,950 Bulgarians, 4,000 Vlachs (Aromanians), and 400 Christian Albanians, according to the Bulgarian geographer Vasil Kanchov's statistics. Due to intermarriage with locals, at the onset of the twentieth century, few in the small Orthodox Albanian community spoke Albanian. A neighbourhood inhabited by Aromanians in Kruševo bears the name Arbineš, meaning "Albanians" in the Aromanian language. Per the Bulgarian teacher Nikola Kirov, who was native to the town, most of the Aromanians as well as the Orthodox Albanians were in fact Grecomans.

During the Ilinden Uprising of 1903, the rebels proclaimed a short-lived Kruševo Republic. Its leader, Nikola Karev, created a council of Kruševo's notable citizens, with twenty members from each of the town's three major ethnic groups (Slavic speakers, Albanians, and Vlachs). As the uprising was suppressed, the city was almost completely destroyed by the Ottoman army. One of the most important points in the Ilinden Uprising was the declaration of the "Kruševo Manifesto", which called for all the people of Macedonia, regardless of their nationality or religion, to fight together against the Ottoman Empire in order to establish an independent Macedonian republic. There is a monument in Kruševo called Mečkin Kamen ("bear's stone"), marking the place where Pitu Guli's band tried to defend the town from Turkish troops. The band and their leader are remembered as heroic defenders of Kruševo and the surrounding villages.

== Demographics ==
As of the 2021 census, the town of Kruševo had 4,104 inhabitants, and its ethnic composition was as follows:

- Macedonians 3,053 (74.4%)
- Aromanians 866 (21.1%)
- Persons for whom data are taken from administrative sources 146 (3.6%)
- Serbs 10 (0.2%)
- Albanians 9 (0.2%)
- Bosniaks 1 (0.0%)
- others 19 (0.5%)

Year	Macedonian	Albanian	Turks	Romani	Aromanians	Serbs	Bosniaks	Others	Person for whom data are taken from administrative sources	Total
2002	4.273	...	...	...	1.023	...	...	37		5,330
2021	3.053	9	...	...	866	10	1	165	146	4,104

The official languages of the town are, since 2006, Macedonian and Aromanian. Kruševo is the only locality where Aromanian has any kind of official status.

The religious composition of the town was the following:

- Orthodox Christians – 5,275 (99.0%)
- others – 55 (1.0%)
Churches in Kruševo

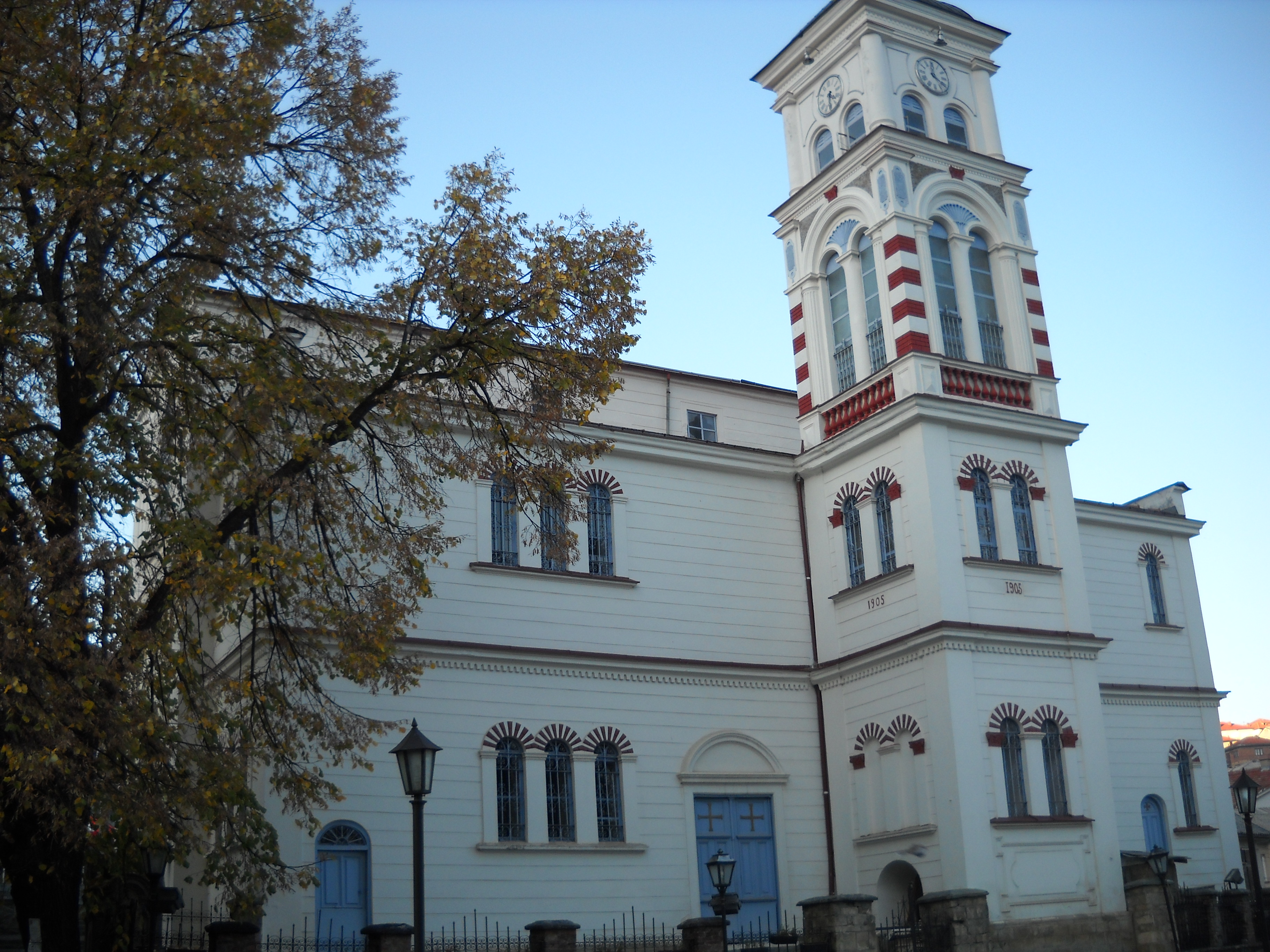
Church of St. Nicholas

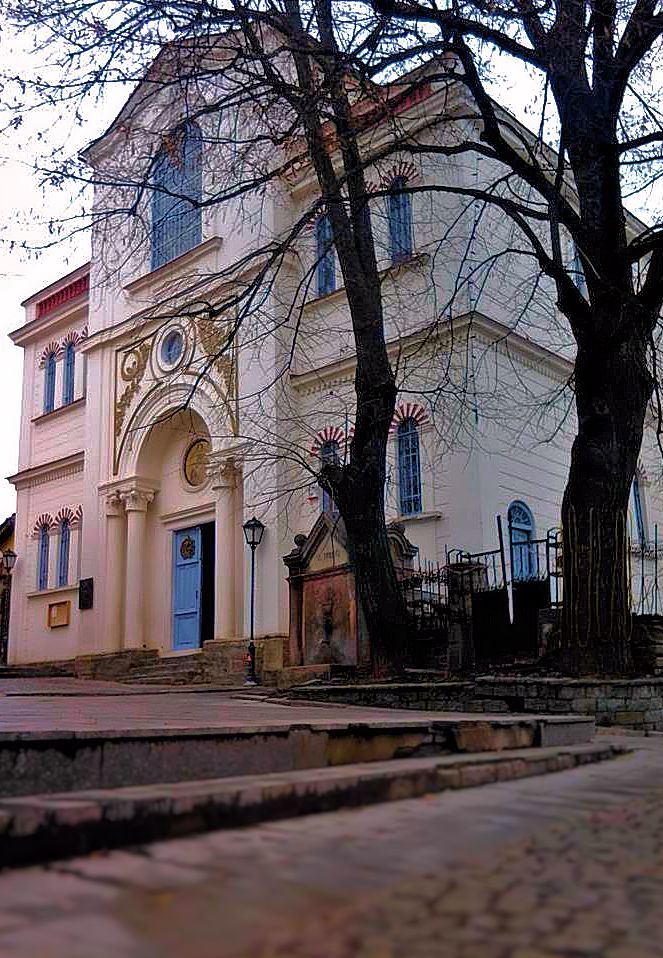
Church of St. Nicholas

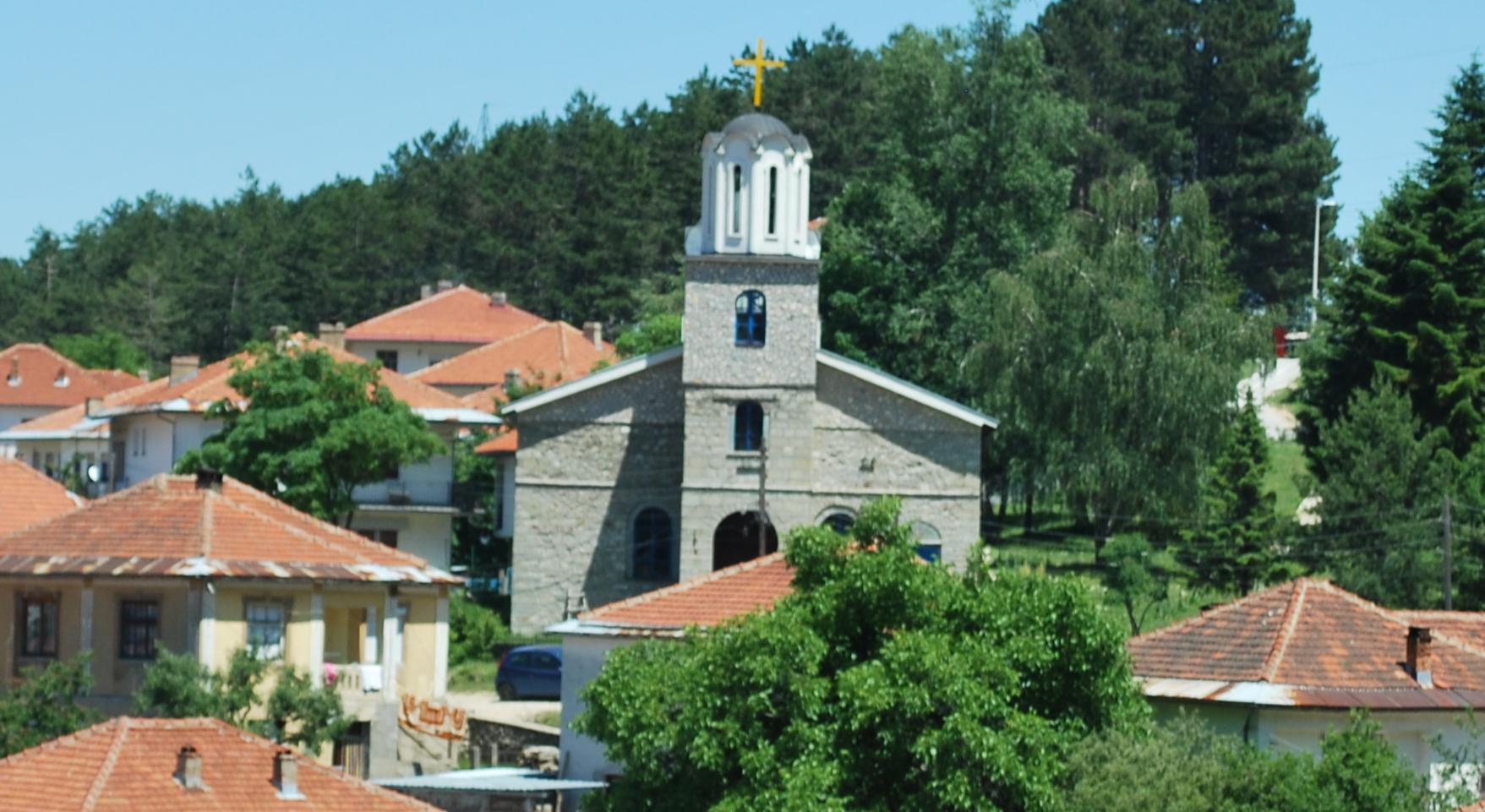
Church of the Holy Trinity

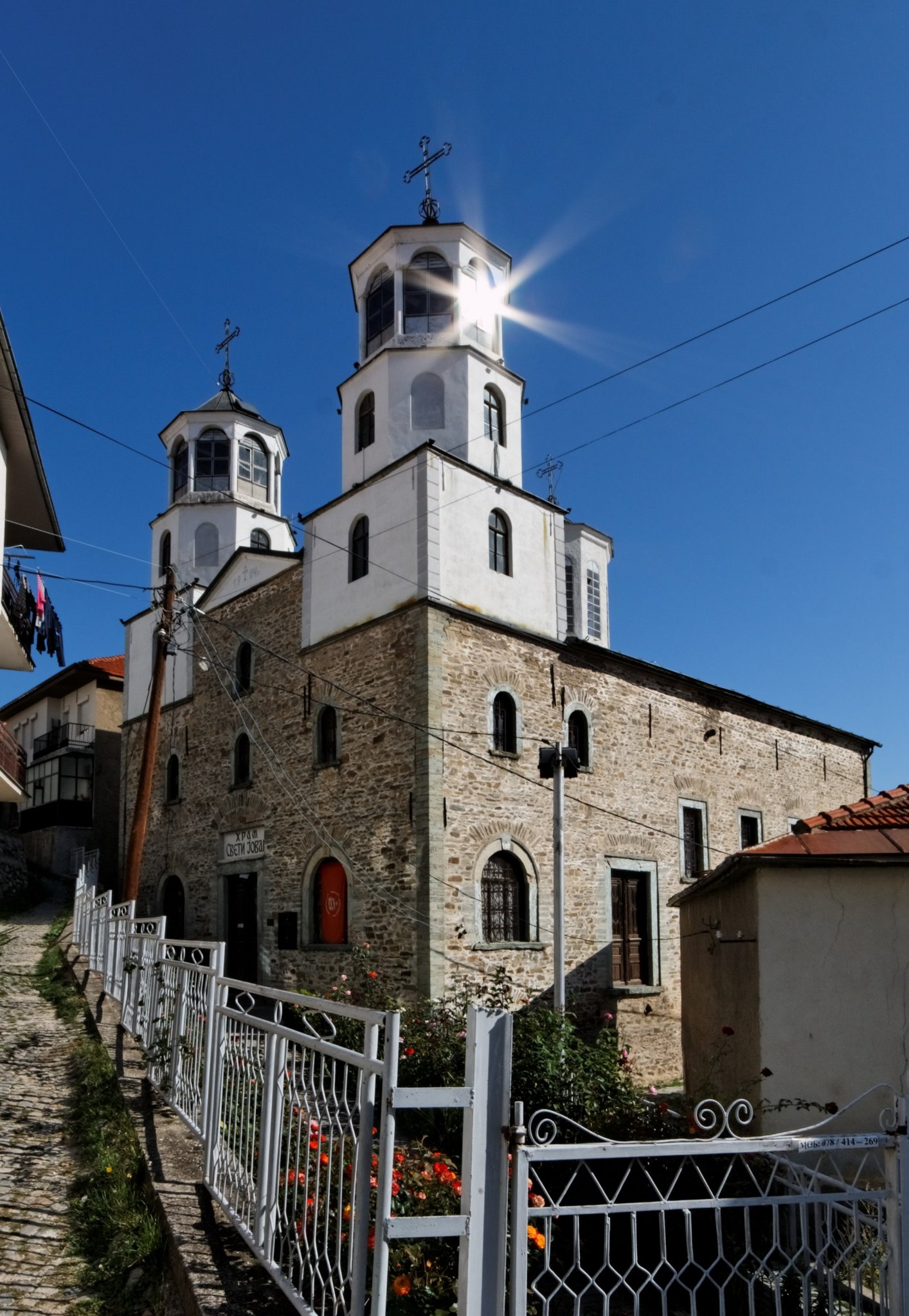
Church of St. John the Baptist

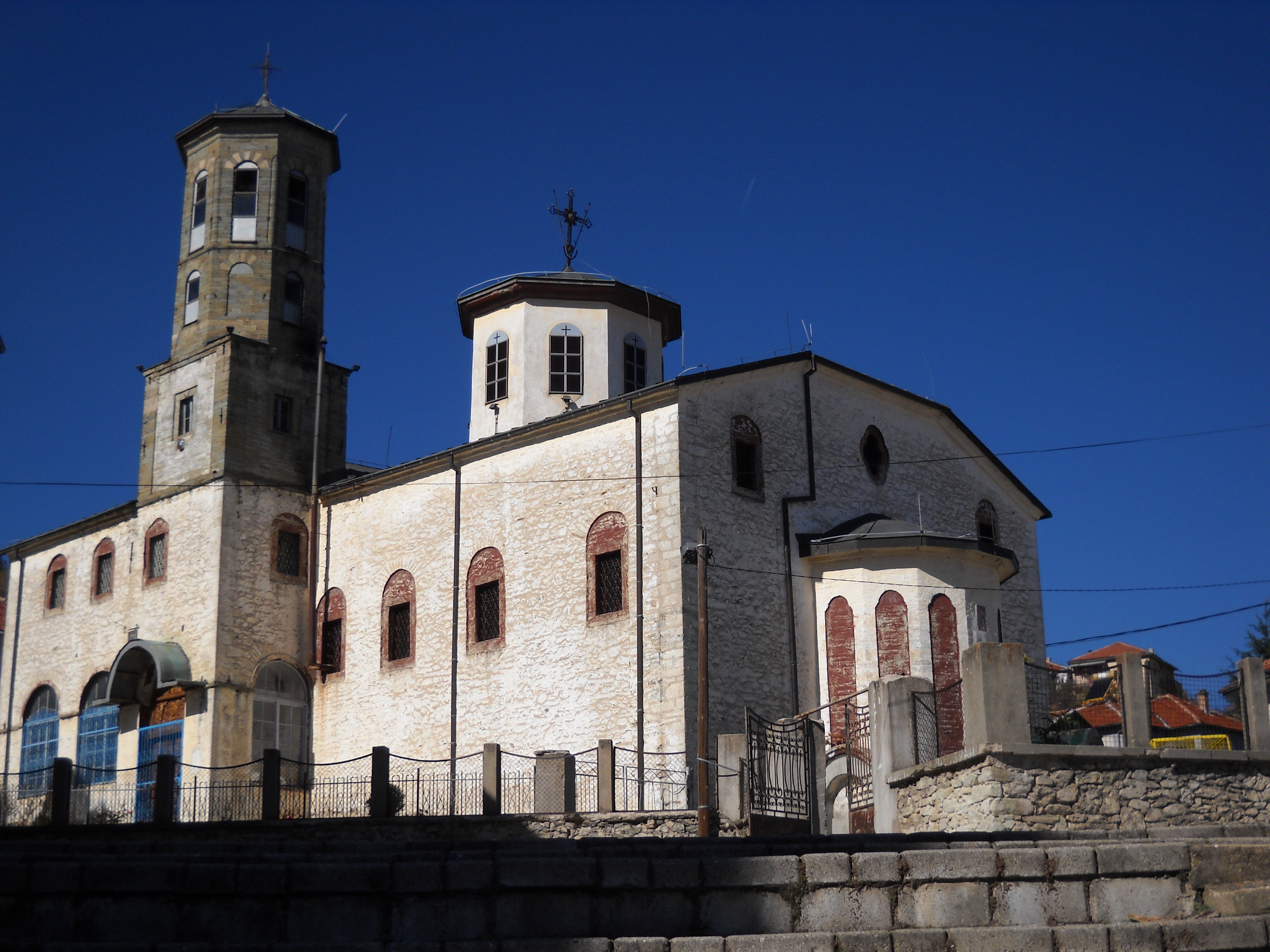
Church of St. Mother of God

== Features ==
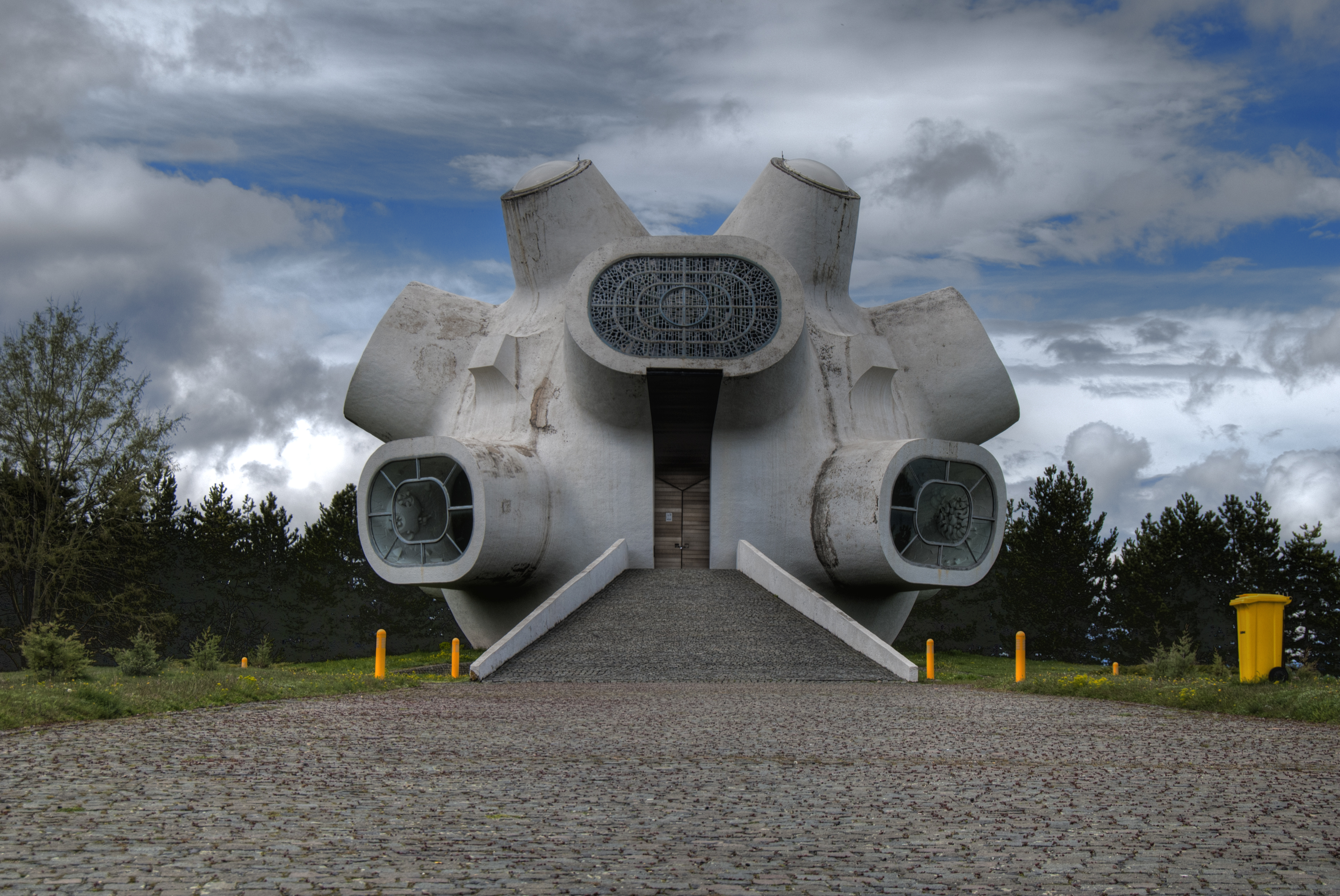
Makedonium monument, dedicated to the Ilinden Uprising

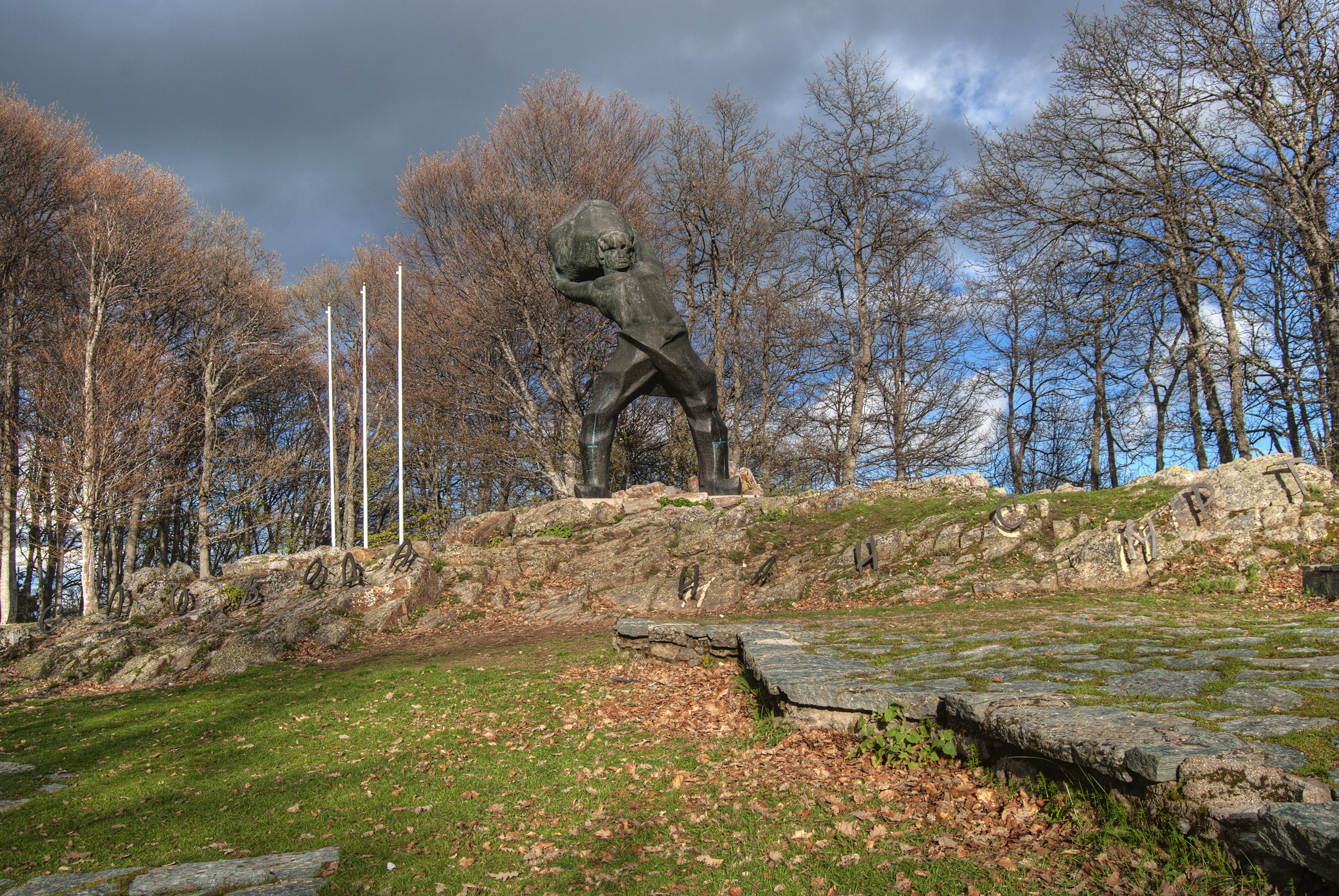
Mečkin Kamen

Kruševo is a mountainous town. Situated at an altitude of 1,350 metres (4,430 ft), it is the highest town in North Macedonia. It is known for its 19th-century Ottoman architecture.

Kruševo is the home of Mečkin Kamen, a historical landmark that marks the location of the Ilinden Uprising of 1903. On 2 August each year, it is one of two sites where the Macedonian Day of the Republic is celebrated. The town also hosts the Makedonium monument, another landmark commemorating the Ilinden Uprising.

The local football club FK Pitu Guli is named after the revolutionary leader and plays in the Macedonian Third League (South division).

=== Toše Proeski Memorial House ===
The pop singer Toše Proeski grew up in Kruševo, and after his death in 2007, several monuments to him were inaugurated in the town, including the Toše Proeski Memorial House, which opened in April 2011. The museum holds all his awards, many of his childhood belongings, recreations of his living room and home recording studio, as well as a wax model of Proeski. The museum is shaped like a cross as a reference to Proeski's devout Orthodox faith. Its interior walls are covered with song lyrics, including his signature concert phrase "Ve sakam site" (I love you all), translated into over 100 languages. At the 2011 World Architecture Festival in Barcelona, the building won the People's Choice Award.

== Notable people ==
- Toše Proeski (1981–2007), pop singer famous throughout the Balkans
- Nikola Karev (1877–1905), politician, revolutionary leader
- Pitu Guli (1865–1903), revolutionary leader
- Vasil Iljoski (1902–1995), writer
- Nikola Martinoski (1903–1973), painter
- Ioryi Mucitano (1882–1911), revolutionary
- Ilija Najdoski (born 1964), footballer, European Cup champion
- Taki Fiti (born 1950), academic, former president of the Macedonian Academy of Sciences and Arts, politician, author
- Nicolae Constantin Batzaria (1874–1952), writer, Ottoman Minister of Public Works and Commerce
- Alexandros Svolos (1892–1956), prominent Greek legal expert, president of the Political Committee of National Liberation, a Resistance-based government during the Axis Occupation of Greece
- Mencha Karnicheva (1900–1964), revolutionary
- Nikola Gabrovski (1871–1962), military figure
- Yiannis Boutaris (1942–2024), Greek businessman, politician, former mayor of Thessaloniki

== Architecture ==
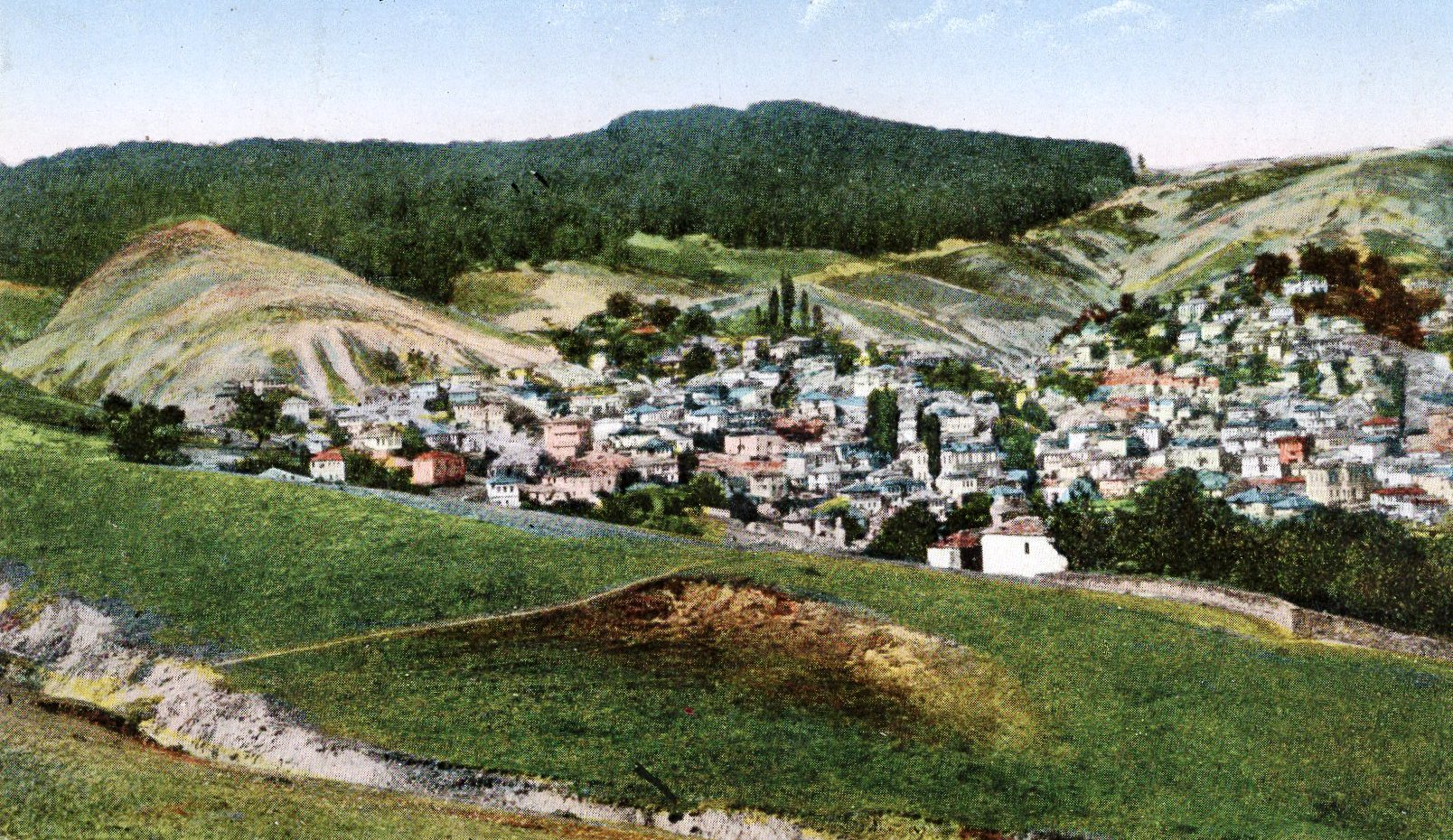
1920s postcard from Kruševo

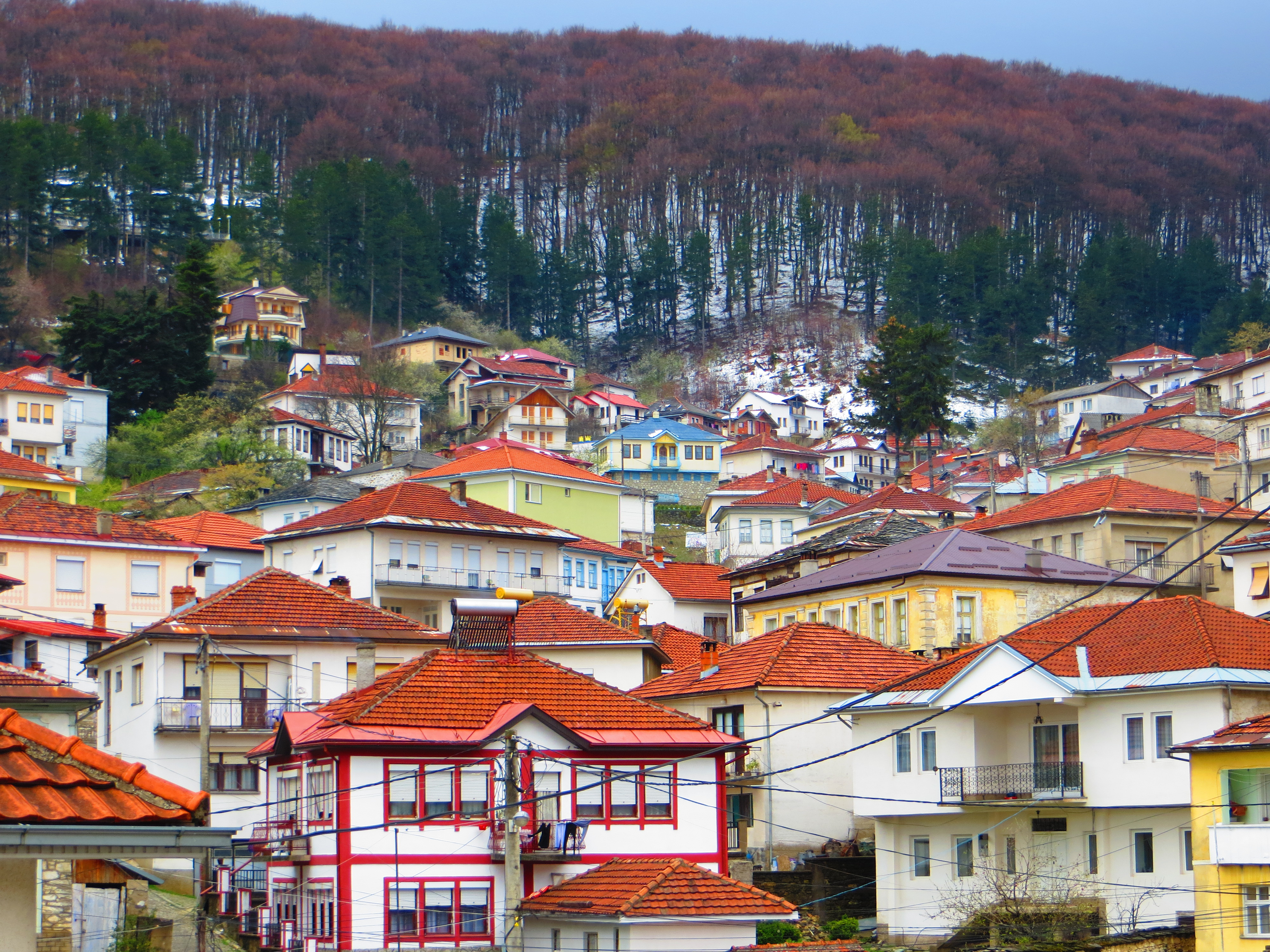
Town architecture

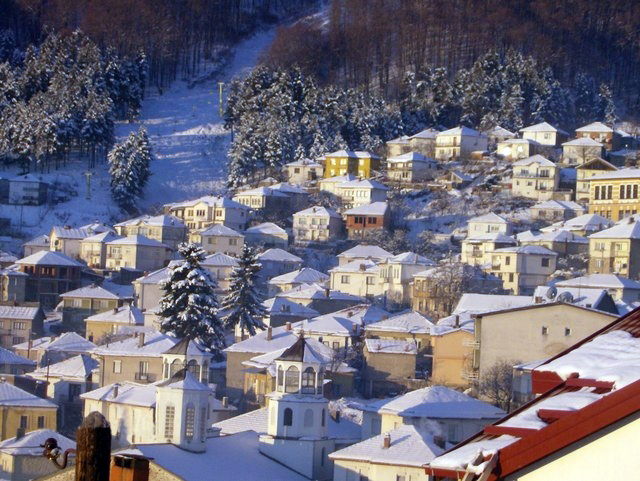
Kruševo in winter

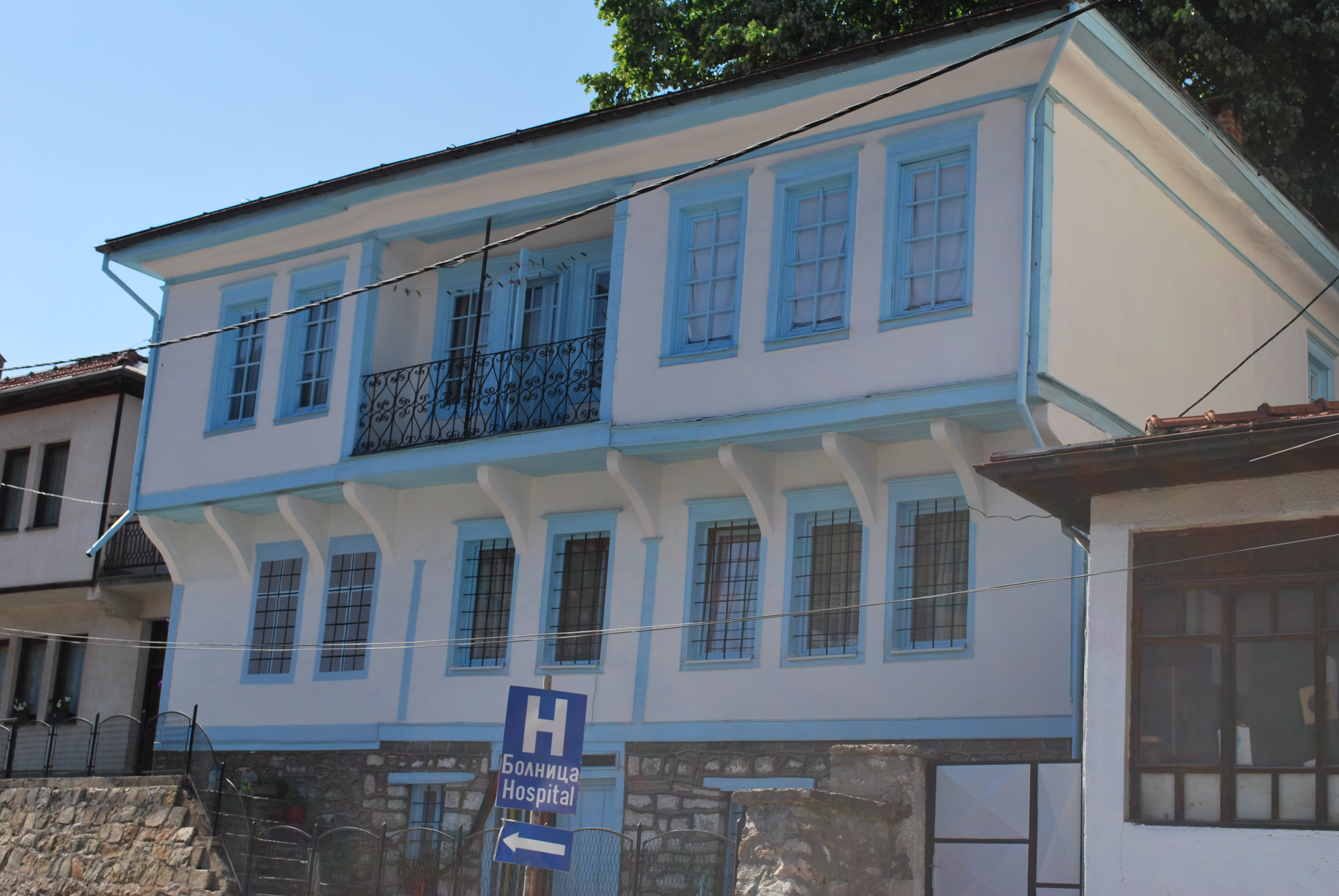
A typical house

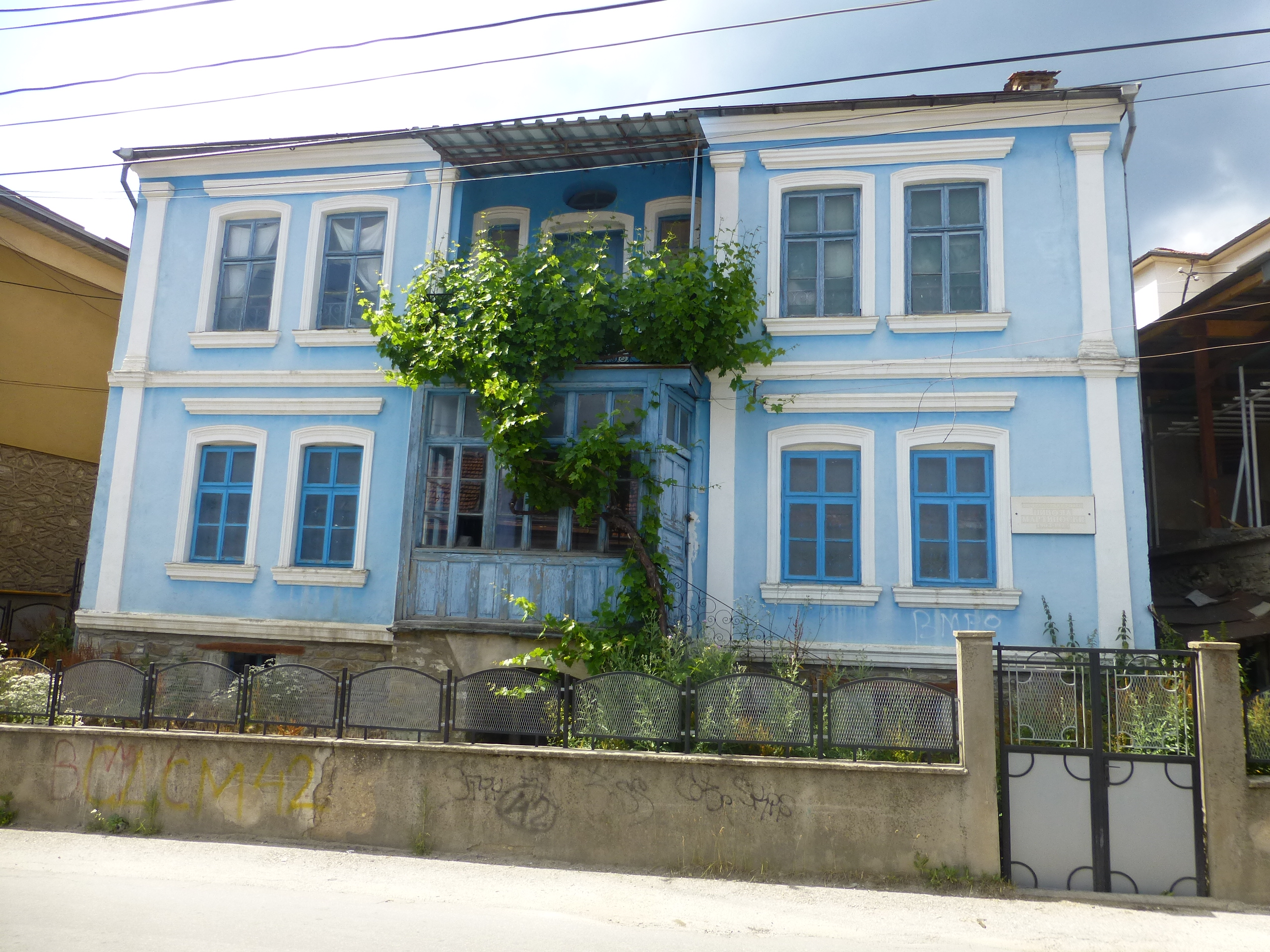
Birth house of Nikola Martinoski

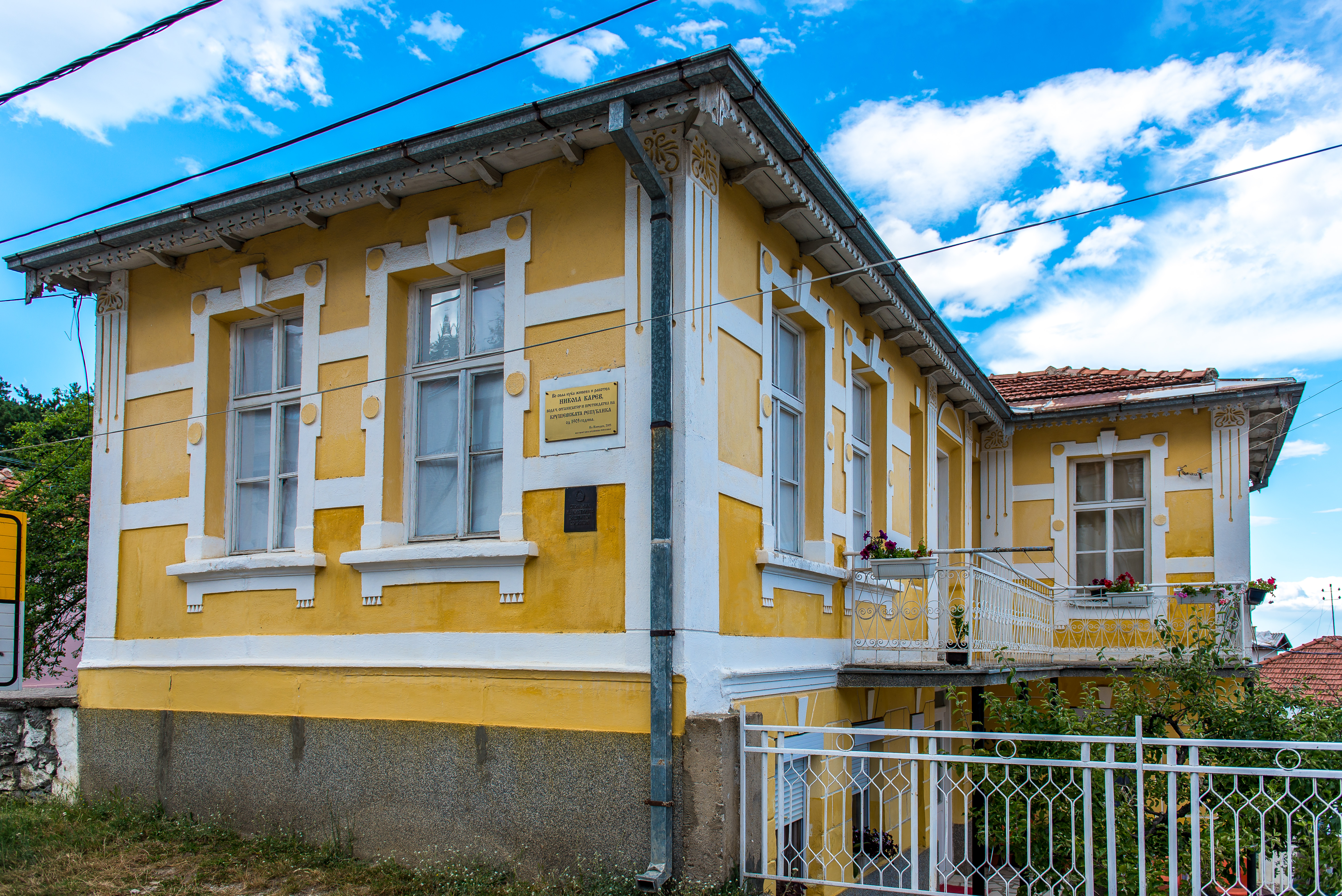
A house where Nikola Karev lived

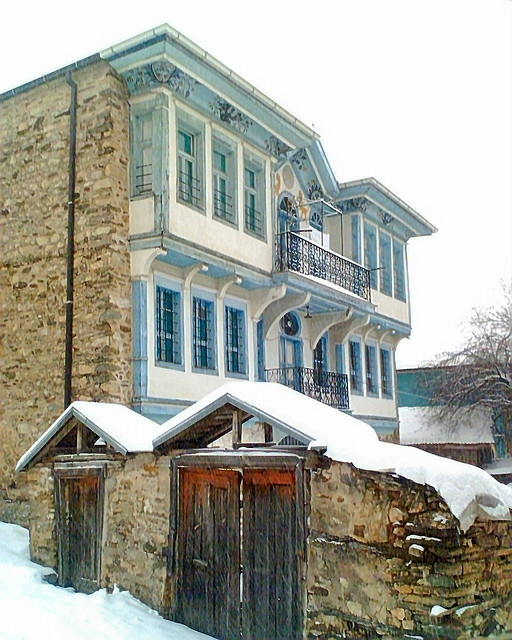
A typical house

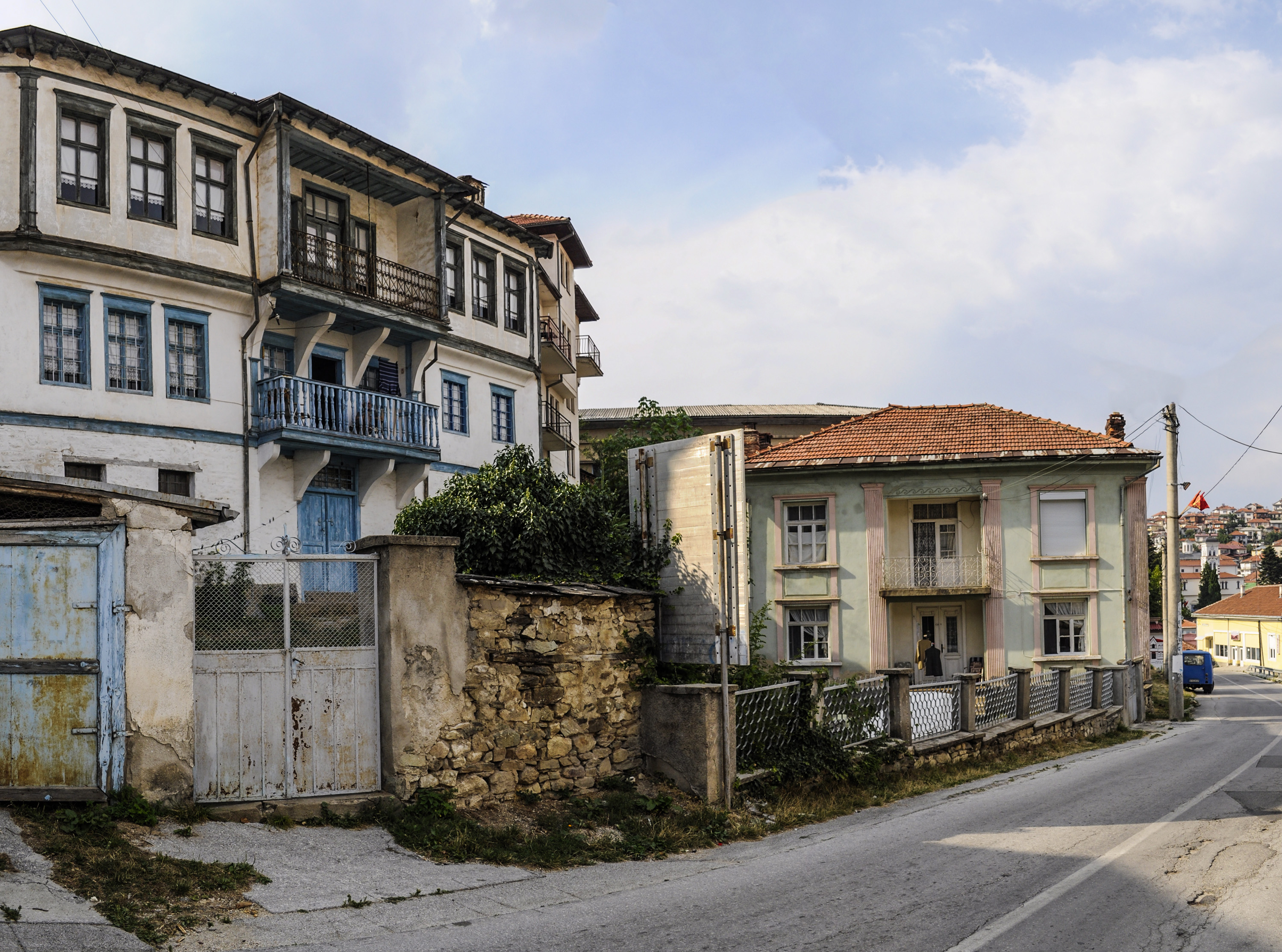
A typical house

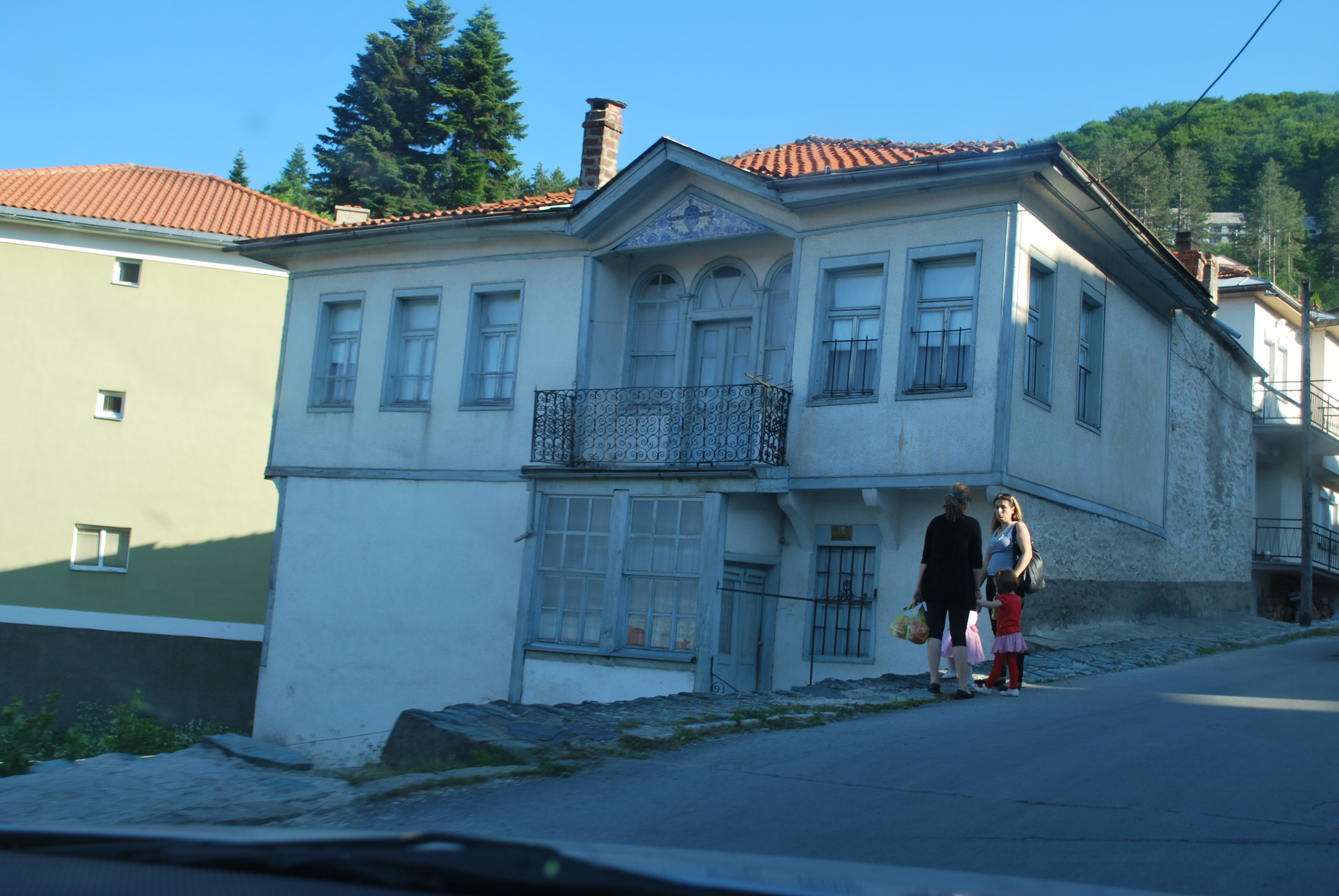
A typical house

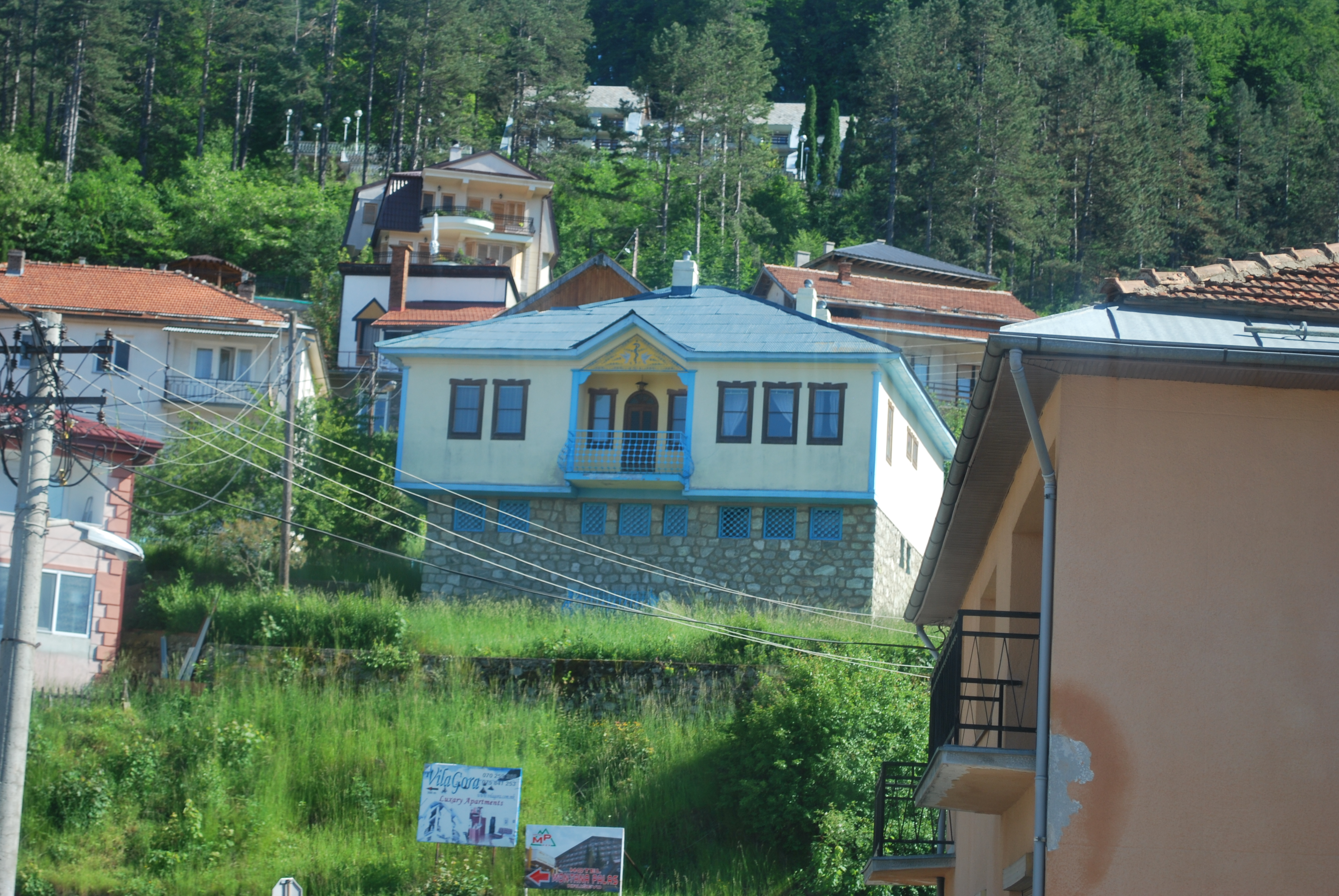
A typical house

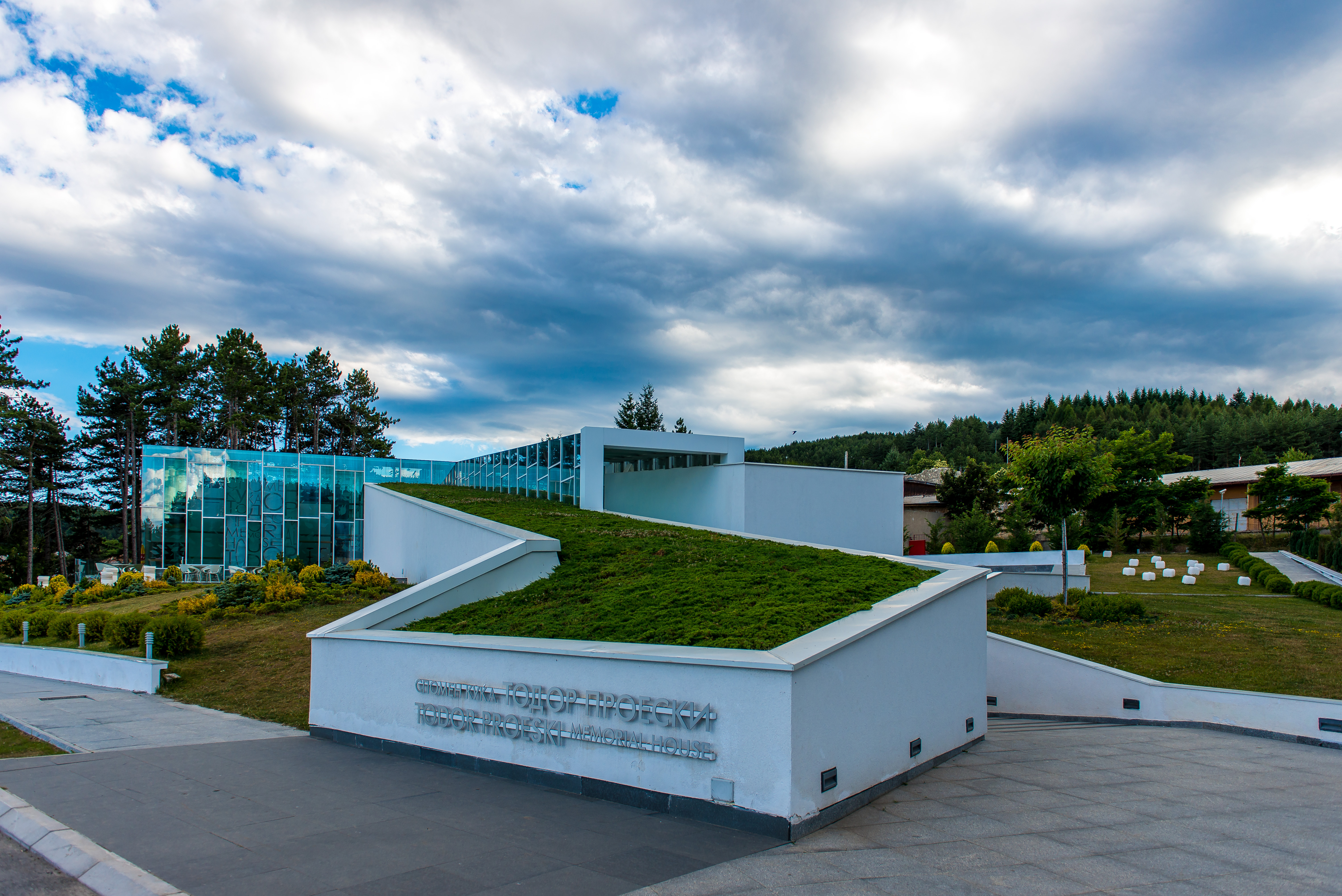
Toše Proeski Memorial House

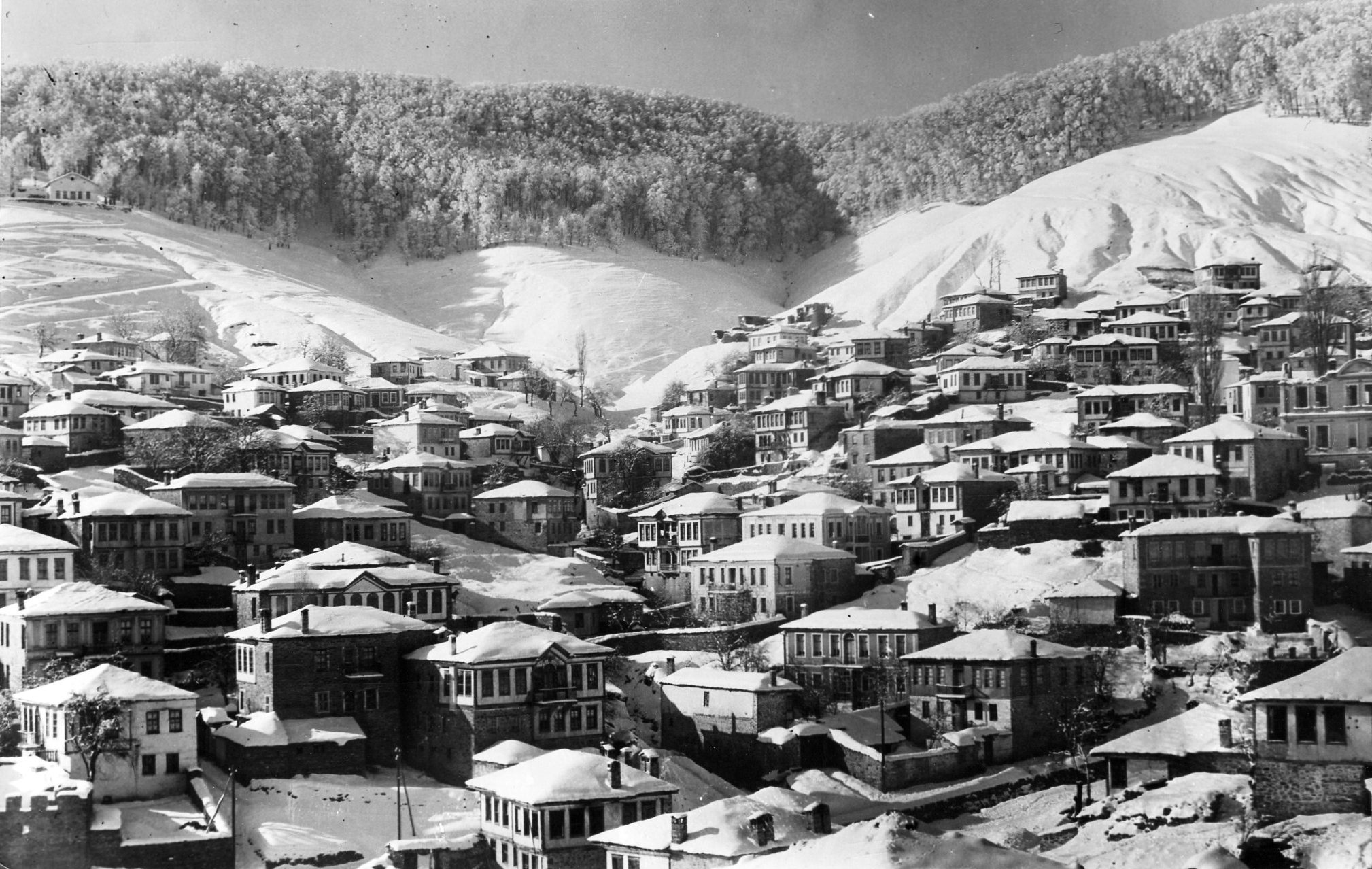
Kruševo during the 1930s

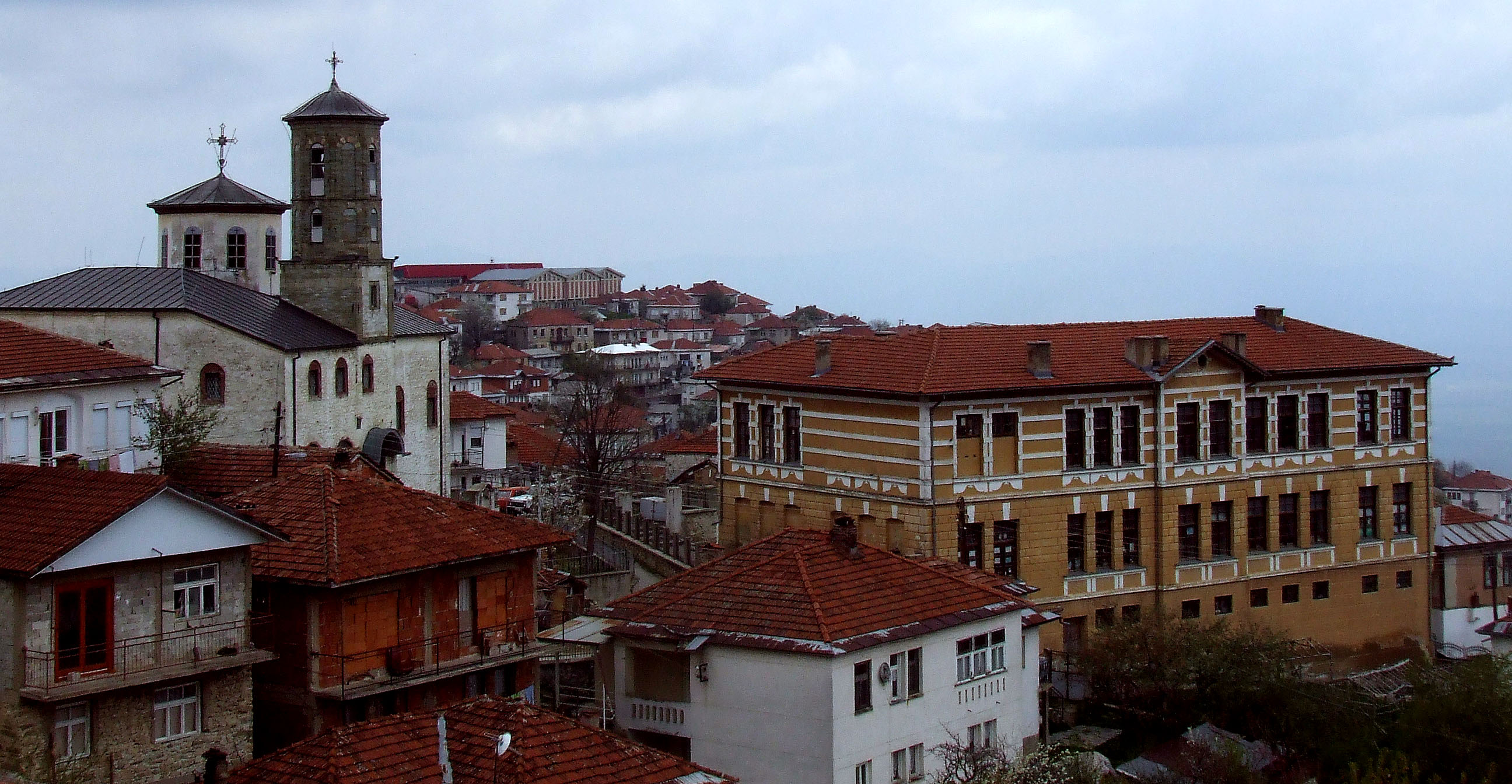
Mother of God church and a town school

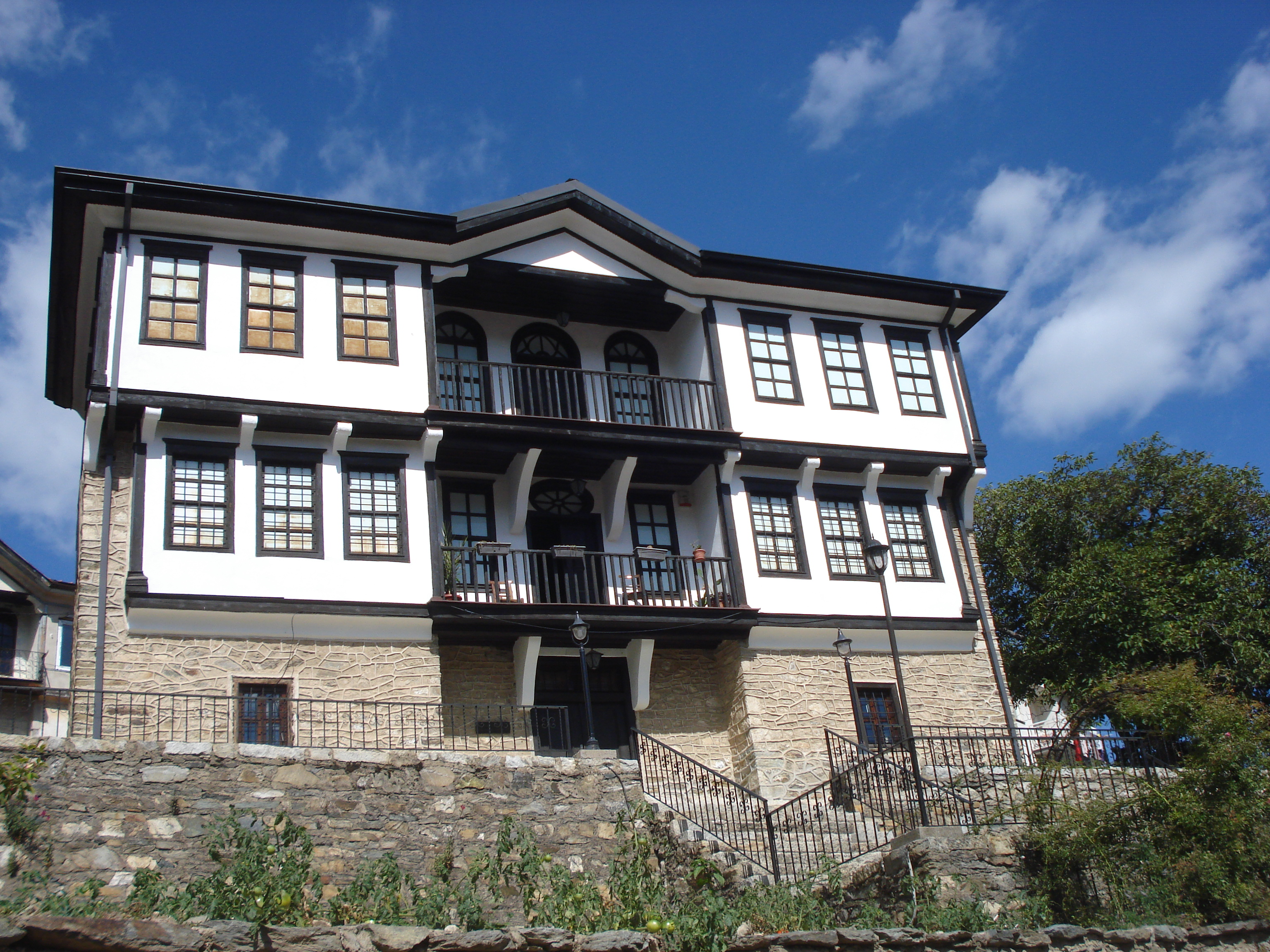
Nikola Martinoski Gallery
