= Sts. Cyril and Methodius High School of Humanities, Plovdiv =

Coordinates: 42.1527°N 24.7485°E

Sts. Cyril and Methodius High School of Humanities
- 15 Han Kubrat Street, Central District, Plovdiv, Bulgaria, 4000

Information
- Type: Public School
- Motto: Through labor and enlightenment towards progress and prosperity
- Founded: September 1, 1850
- Founder: Nayden Gerov
- Principal: Emil Nachev
- Grades: 8-12
- Gender: Mixed
- Website: https://ghp-plovdiv.org/

Situated in the heart of Plovdiv, Saints Cyril and Methodius High School of Humanities (Хуманитарна гимназия "Св. св. Кирил и Методий", Пловдив) is one of Bulgaria's oldest educational institutions.

With a strong focus on humanities and social sciences, the curriculum is supported by a variety of extracurricular activities, especially those related to community work, like volunteering.

== History ==
=== Founding and early years ===
The Plovdiv Eparchial School, now known as the Humanities High School, was founded in 1850 by Nayden Gerov. The school quickly became a symbol of Bulgarian spirit and culture, playing a crucial role in the formation of the modern Bulgarian state and nation.

Initially, Gerov structured the educational process using Russian high school programs. His efforts were highly successful, with the first exam in 1851 impressing Bishop Andrea Canova, who remarked, "...the answers to many of the questions I posed are ones I learned in Europe, in higher education institutions. How is it possible for such a newly founded school to grasp such difficult knowledge?"

Prominent public figure Ivan Evstratiev Geshov fondly remembered the eight "blissful years" he spent at the school, noting that by 1863, subjects like statistics and the history of fine arts were being taught. He praised the French language instruction, claiming he learned French better than students in high schools in 1916.

=== After liberation ===
After the Liberation, the Plovdiv Gymnasium resumed its activities, and attracted Czech educators who significantly elevated its standards.

Despite its dedication to academics, Plovdiv Gymnasium maintained a strong commitment to Bulgarian national sentiments and ideals. Its students actively participated in pivotal national events, including the Grand National Assembly in Tarnovo in 1879, where they made significant contributions to drafting the First Bulgarian Constitution.

== Official names ==
NAME	YEARS USED	GENDER COMPOSITION
'Sts. Cyril and Methodius' Class Eparchial School	1850–1867	Single-sex
'Sts. Cyril and Methodius' Plovdiv Male Gymnasium	1868–1884	Single-sex
'Prince Alexander I' 1st Male Gymnasium	1885–1947	Single-sex
'Dimitar Blagoev' Unified Secondary Polytechnic School	1948–1993	Mixed
'Prince Alexander I' Secondary General Education School	1994–1995	Mixed
'Sts. Cyril and Methodius' Gymnasium with Humanities Profile	1996–2015	Mixed
'Sts. Cyril and Methodius' Specialized Humanities High School	2016–2017	Mixed
'Sts. Cyril and Methodius' High School of Humanities	2017–Present	Mixed

== Notable alumni ==
=== Teachers ===
==== Authors and publishers ====
- Yoakim Gruev (1828–1912), translator and author of textbooks
- Hristo G. Danov (1828–1911), the father of organized book publishing in Bulgaria

==== Artists ====
- Georgi Danchov (1846–1908), photographer, illustrator and comics artist
- Ivan Mrkvička (1856–1938), painter
- Anton Mitov (1862–1930), art critic and art historian
- Zlatyu Boyadzhiev (1903–1976), painter
- Svetoslav Obretenov (1909–1955), composer and choir conductor

==== Politicians ====
- Petko Karavelov (1843–1903), served 4 times as Prime Minister of Bulgaria, founder of the Liberal Party and later the Democratic Party
- Dimitar Blagoev (1856–1924), journalist, philosopher and founder of the Bulgarian Communist Party
- Andey Toshev (1867–1944), professor of botany, diplomat and former Prime Minister of Bulgaria

==== Other ====
- Anton Bezenshek (1854–1915), journalist and shorthand expert
- Antonín Šourek (1857–1926), mathematician
- Frantisek Splitek, mathematician
- Ludwig Lukash, chemist
- Karel Škorpil (1859–1944), archaeologist and museum worker
- Nikola Gabrovski (1871–1962), colonel in the Bulgarian army
- Stefan I of Bulgaria (1878–1957), Bulgarian prelate

=== Students ===
==== Revolutionary activists ====
- Lyuben Karavelov (1834–1879), poet, journalist and leader of the Bulgarian Revolutionary Central Committee
- Vasil Levski (1837–1873), founder of the Internal Revolutionary Organisation
- Todor Kableshkov (1851–1876), one of the leaders of the April Uprising

==== Prime Ministers of Bulgaria ====
- Ivan Geshov (1849–1924), politician, governor of the Bulgarian National Bank (1883-1886)
- Konstantin Stoilov (1853–1901), lawyer, politician and founder of the People's Party
- Andrey Lyapchev (1866–1933), politician
- Georgi Kyoseivanov (1884–1960), politician and diplomat

==== Politicians ====
- Mikhail Madzharov (1854–1944), lawyer and diplomat: MP under the People's Party from 1880, Financial Director of Eastern Rumelia (1884-1885), Bulgarian Ambassador to the UK (1913), to Russia (1914-1915), Minister of Foreign Affairs (1919-1920)

==== Writers ====
- Ivan Vazov (1850–1921) poet and novelist, nominated for the 1917 Nobel Prize in Literature
- Pencho Slaveykov (1866–1912), poet and philosopher
- Peyo Yavorov (1878–1914), poet
- Luydmil Stoyanov (1886–1973), writer, translator, and literary critic
- Dimcho Debelyanov (1887–1916), poet

==== Scientists ====
- Asen Zlatarov (1885–1936), biochemist, writer and social activist

==== Composers ====
- Panayot Pipkov (1871–1942), composer of children's choir songs
- Georgi Atanasov (1882–1931), the first professional Bulgarian opera composer
