= Nikola Kirov =

Bulgarian teacher, revolutionary and public figure

Nikola Kirov Никола Киров
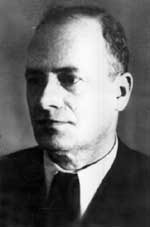
- Born: 28 June 1880; Kruševo, Manastir Vilayet, Ottoman Empire (now North Macedonia)
- Died: 2 August 1962 (aged 82); Sofia, People's Republic of Bulgaria
- Occupations: Teacher, publicist, revolutionary

Nikola Kirov Traykov, known also as Mayski (Никола Киров Трайков - Майски; 28 June 1880 – 2 August 1962) was a Macedonian Bulgarian teacher, revolutionary and public figure, a member of IMRO.

== Biography ==
Nikola Kirov was born on 28 June 1880 in Kırşova, in the Manastir Vilayet of the Ottoman Empire (present-day North Macedonia). He completed basic education in his hometown, but then studied at the Bulgarian Men's High School in Bitola, from where he was expelled in 1898. He moved later to Thessaloniki and in 1902 graduated the Bulgarian Men's High School of Thessaloniki. In the high school he joined the IMRO. During the Ilinden-Preobrazhenie uprising, Nikola Kirov was in Kruševo and participated in the declaration and defense of the Kruševo Republic, and after the uprising was the head of the Kruševo Revolutionary Committee. He became Bulgarian Exarchate teacher in Embore and later in Debar and in 1911-1912 he was the director of the Bulgarian school in Resen.

After the Second Balkan War he emigrated with his whole family to Bulgaria and graduated from Sofia University. He participated in the activities of the Macedonian Federative Organization and of the Ilinden (Organization). In 1923 he published the novel "Ilinden", in which he attributed to Nikola Karev the creation of the Kruševo Manifesto. It was one of the first literary works that were published in his native Prilep-Bitola dialect, even before there was a standardized Macedonian language. He is the author of the works "Looking to Macedonia", "Krushevo and his struggles for freedom" (1935), "The Krushevo Epic", "Light to Darkness" and others. He also appeared as a playwright and poet. Kirov regularly published materials in the magazine "Ilinden". Kirov's writings, which are among the most known primary sources on the rebellion, mention Bulgarians, Vlachs and sic: Grecomans, who participated in the events in Kruševo.

He died in 1962 in Sofia.
