= Mother with Child =

Painting by Nikola Martinoski

- Nurse, 1967, oil on canvas
- Artist: Nikola Martinoski
- Year: 1930s - 60s
- Type: Modern art
- Location: Museum of Contemporary Art of Macedonia, Skopje

Mother with Child, also known as Nurse, is an oil painting art series by Macedonian modern artist Nikola Martinoski created from the 1930s to the 1960s. The pictures depict a Macedonian Romani woman breastfeeding a child. The works mainly employ oil paint on canvas. The works today are considered as one of the finest art pieces in the contemporary Macedonian art.

== See also ==
- Breastfeeding in art
