= Nikola Martinoski =

Macedonian Yugoslav painter (1903–1973)

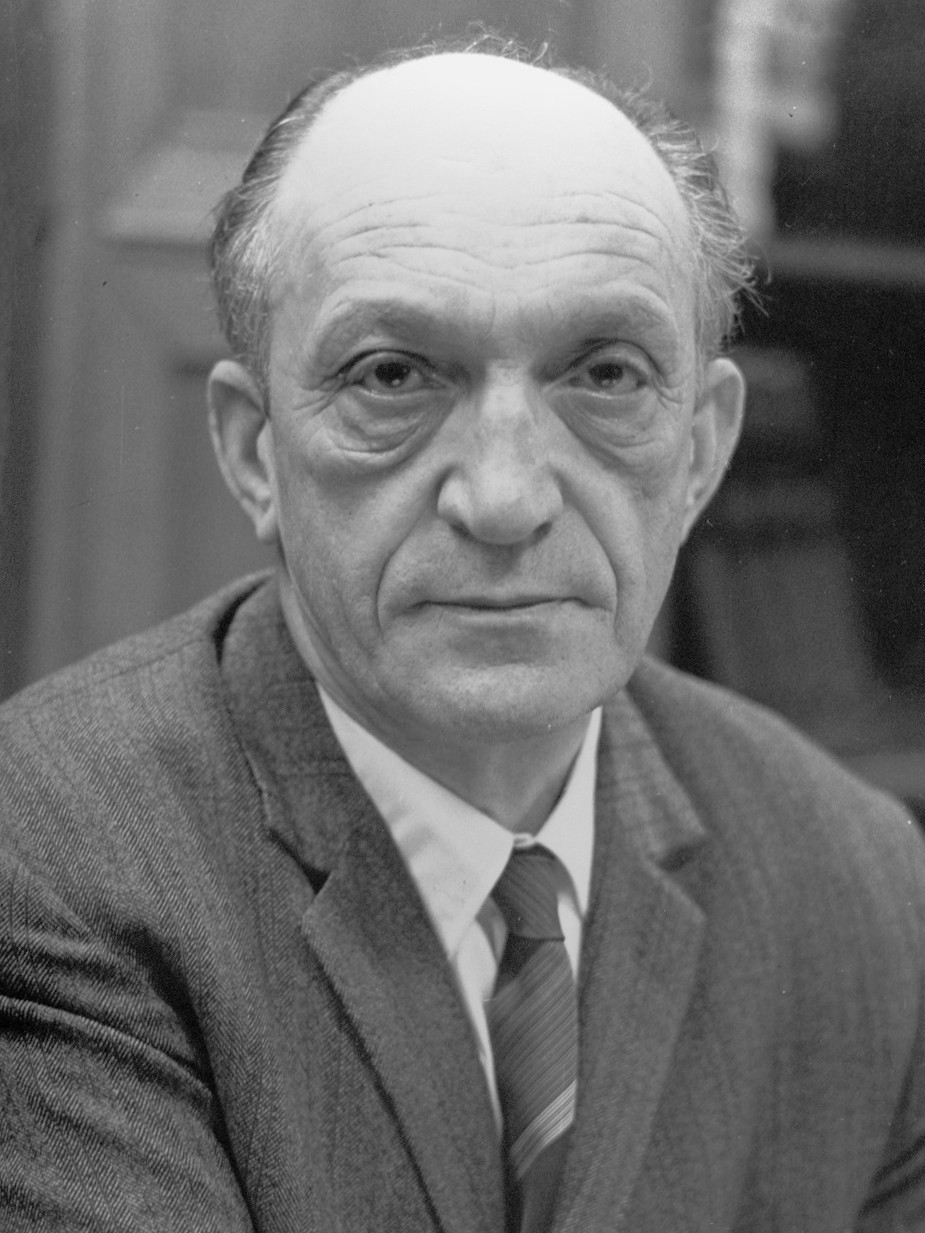
Nikola Martinoski in 1967

Nikola Martinoski (born Nicolache Martin; Aromanian: Nicola Martinoschi, Macedonian: Никола Мартиноски; 18 August 1903 – 7 February 1973), sometimes spelled Martinovski (Aromanian: Martinovschi, Macedonian: Мартиновски), was a Macedonian Yugoslav painter of Aromanian ethnicity. He is considered as a founder of contemporary Macedonian art. Martinoski is best known for his painting titled Mother with Child, which, although first created in the 1930s, was not completed until the 1960s. He is also known as "The Doctor" for the many paintings he donated to modern art.

== Early life ==
Martinoski was born Nicolache Martin in 1903 to an Aromanian family in Kruševo (Aromanian: Crushuva; at the time part of the Ottoman Empire). He developed an interest in painting at a young age and attended art classes in the workshop of Dimitar Andonov-Papradinski, an icon painter in Skopje. Prior to 1921, he was constantly on the move. Finally, Nikola settled down in Bucharest, Romania and attended the Academy of Fine Arts, now known as the Bucharest National University of Arts, from which he graduated in 1927.

== Years in Paris ==
Martinoski spent two years (1927–1928) in Paris at the Académie de la Grande Chaumière, which is famous for former students Amedeo Modigliani and Boris Anrep and the Académie Ranson with artists like the Polish painter Moise Kisling and Roger Bissiere, who acted as mentors. This period had a major impact on his life and style as a painter.

== Life in Skopje ==
Bride (Young Gypsy) (1937)

Martinoski came back to Skopje brimming with avant-garde ideas about art. He developed a very specific expressionistic style and started dealing with social themes rather than portraits. Nikola soon became a member of the Belgrade group Oblik.

His first individual exhibition was in 1929 in Skopje. Afterwards, he started exhibiting in other cities such as Belgrade, Zagreb and Paris. While he continued drawing, painting, and exhibiting, Martinoski also began creating large murals. Later, he established the Artistic Gallery located in Skopje (now known as the National Gallery of Macedonia) and won numerous awards.

Martinoski died on 7 February 1973, at the age of sixty-nine in Skopje, then in Yugoslavia. He gave sixty-two of his paintings to Kruševo as a parting gift. His home in Kruševo is now a gallery where a small number of his works are exhibited.

== Centenary of Martinoski's birth ==
In 2003, the National Gallery of Macedonia completed the project "100 years from Martinoski's birth". The exhibition featured paintings that had never been publicly shown before because they were part of 116 paintings that Martinoski left to his family in a nondescript box.

== Painting style ==
Many of Martinoski's works were greatly influenced by medieval fresco art and modern Parisian school crisscross. However, his strongest artistic creations were portraits.
