= Nikola Gabrovski =

Bulgarian army officer (1871–1962)

Nikola Gabrovski (Bulgarian and Macedonian: Никола Габровски) was a military figure and a colonel in the Bulgarian army. He was born in the village of Krushevo (present-day North Macedonia) in 1871 and died in 1962 in Sofia. He studied in a gymnasium and then in the Military school in Sofia. Gabrovski took part in all three of the so-called "Wars of National Unification" - the First and Second Balkan and the First World War. He became a member of the "Union of Macedonian brotherhoods" in 1924. He has been awarded numeral medals and honors during his military career. Today, one of the main streets in Veliko Tarnovo bears his name.
