= Kruševo Manifesto =

Presumed manifesto of the 1903 Ilinden-Preobrazhenie Uprising

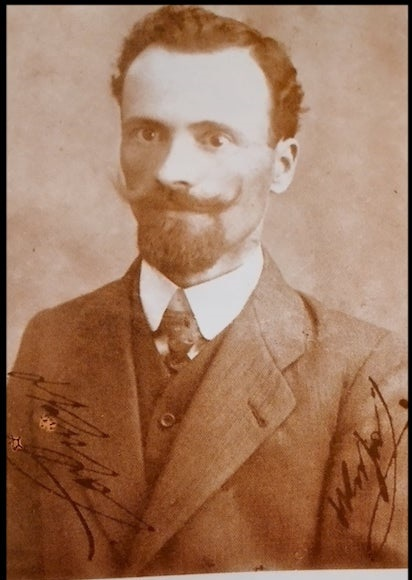
Nikola Kirov Mayski

The Kruševo Manifesto is a presumable manifesto published by the Forest Staff of the Krushevo Revolutionary Region during the 1903 Ilinden-Preobrazhenie Uprising. It was calling upon the Muslim population to join forces with the republican government in the struggle against tyranny, and to attain democratic form of statehood. It urged that the uprising was against the Sultanate, and was not religiously or ethnically based. The original document did not survive, and its historical authenticity is disputed.

The manifesto is cited by modern Macedonian historiography as a historical example of the use of a separate Macedonian language during the uprising, In fact, Macedonian historiography refers to a text published in 1923 by Nikola Kirov in Sofia, in his native dialect, as part of a play called "Ilinden". In the play, he attributed his cousin Nikola Karev the creation of the Manifesto. On the other hand, Macedonian historians object to Kirov's classification of then Krusevo's Slavic population as 'Bulgarian'. At the turn of the 20th century, there were only a few researchers who claimed that a separate Macedonian language and ethnicity existed.
