= Jovan Dimovski (Mechkoski) =

Jovan Dimovski (Mechkoski) Jon Pashata
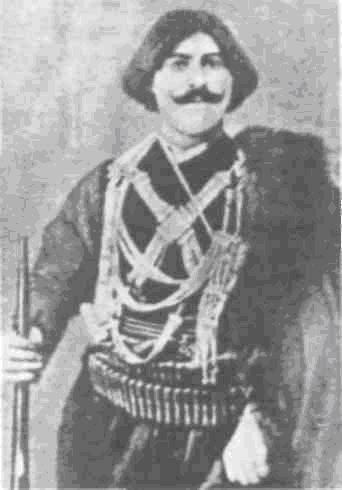
- Macedonian revolutionary
- Born: 1876; Loznani, Bitola region
- Died: 20 November 1907 (aged 30–31); Bitola

Jovan Dimovski (Mechkoski) or Jon Pashata (1876, Loznani, Bitola Region – 20 November 1907, Bitola) was a Macedonian revolutionary, Bitola voivode of the Secret Macedonian-Adrianople Revolutionary Organization.

== Biography ==
Jovan Dimovski (Mechkoski) was born in 1876 in the Bitola region village of Loznani. In 1897, he worked in Romania, and upon returning from seasonal work in 1900, he went to Shebedin Bey, where he had previously worked, broke down the door, and took a rifle and two pistols. He then joined VMORO and, from 1902, became a fighter in the detachment of the voivode Gjorgji Sugarev. During the Ilinden uprising of 1903, he was in the detachment of Ivan Kafedzijata. He led an independent detachment in the Shurkovska Mountain and Prespa region and later operated in the Kichevo and Bitola regions.

In 1904, he was appointed regional voivode in the Bitola plain. Together with Dimche Sarvanov and Trajko Kralot, he fought against the Greek armed propaganda in Macedonia. His comrade-in-arms was Grujo Akelov. On 1 July 1905, near the village of Mogila, they killed the notorious Turkish oppressor Shefki Agha. He acted as an assistant regional voivode to Dimche Sarvanov. His area of operations included the villages of Pelagonia on the right side of the Crna River and Gjavatkol, with a group of six fighters.

At the end of 1907, Jon Pashata fell seriously ill with diphtheria and died in Bitola on 20 November 1907.

He was buried in the courtyard of the Bitola church "St. Nedela" and was later reburied in the grave of a young woman due to frequent military searches in the cemetery.

His descendants and direct family are the Dimovski (Mechkoski) family from Loznani, Bitola region, and the Vrdjovski family from Logovardi, Bitola region.
