= Budakovo =

Budakovo Будаково Budaklar
- Village
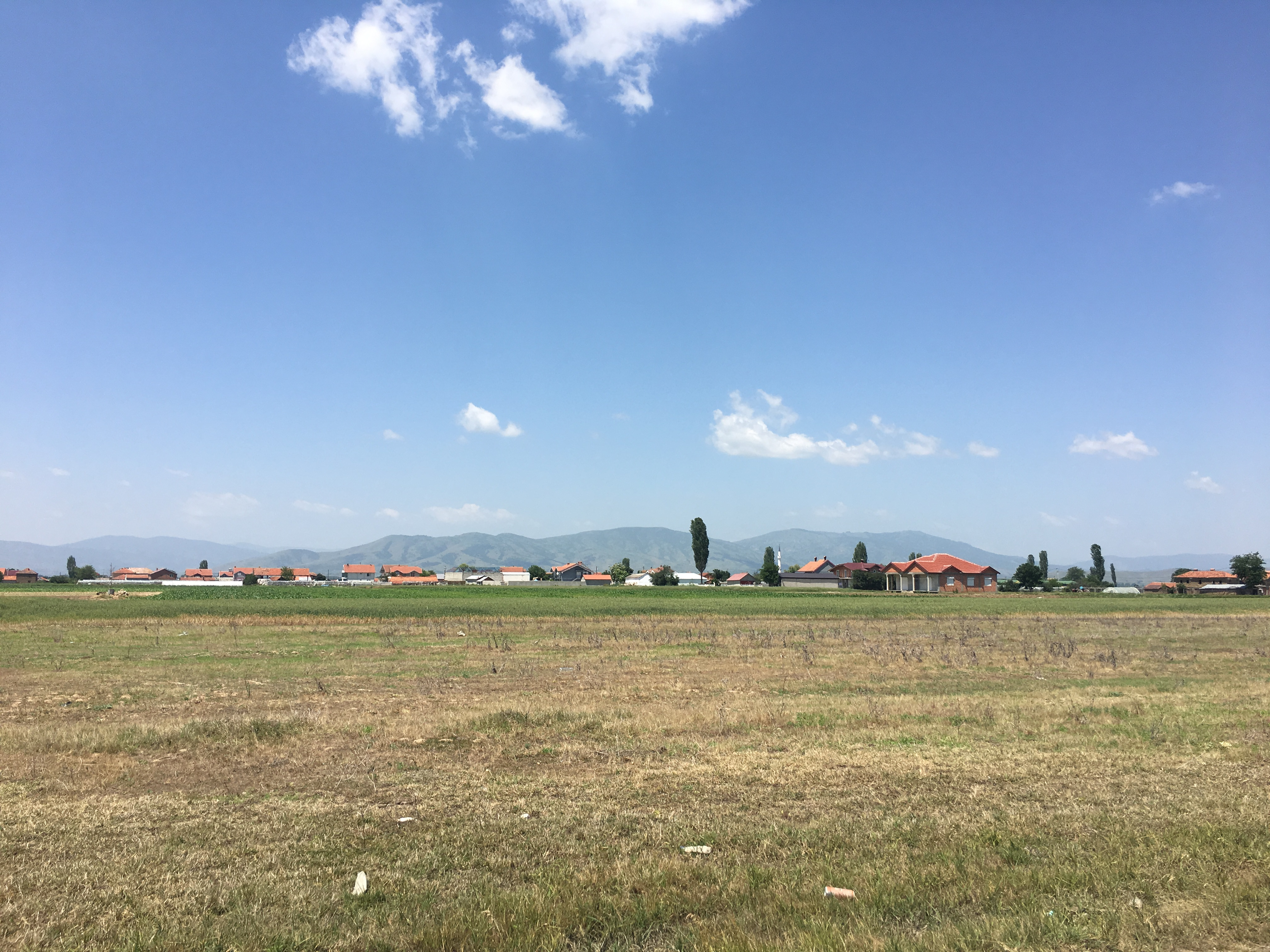
- Panoramic view of the village

- Location within North Macedonia
- Coordinates: 41°08′N 21°28′E
- Country: North Macedonia
- Region: Pelagonia
- Municipality: Mogila

Population (2002)
  - Total: 248
- Time zone: UTC+1 (CET)
  - Summer (DST): UTC+2 (CEST)
- Car plates: BT
- Website: .

Budakovo (Macedonian: Будаково, Turkish: Budaklar) is a village in the municipality of Mogila, North Macedonia. It used to be part of the former municipality of Dobruševo.

== Demographics ==
In the early Ottoman period, Budakovo was one of several villages in the Pelagonia plain settled by nomadic Turkomen tribes from Anatolia during 1475–1543.

According to the 2002 census, the village had a total of 248 inhabitants. Ethnic groups in the village include:

- Turks 200
- Macedonians 44
- Albanians 3
- Others 1
