= Dedebalci =

Dedebalci Дедебалци
- Village
- Location within North Macedonia
- Coordinates: 41.115956°N 21.484230°E
- Country: North Macedonia
- Region: Pelagonia
- Municipality: Mogila

Population (2002)
  - Total: 288
- Time zone: UTC+1 (CET)
  - Summer (DST): UTC+2 (CEST)
- Website: .

Dedebalci (Macedonian: Дедебалци) is a village in the municipality of Mogila, North Macedonia. It used to be part of the former municipality of Dobruševo.

== Demographics ==
According to the 2002 census, the village had a total of 288 inhabitants. Ethnic groups in the village include:

- Macedonians 288
