= Musinci =

Musinci Мусинци Musaobası
- Village
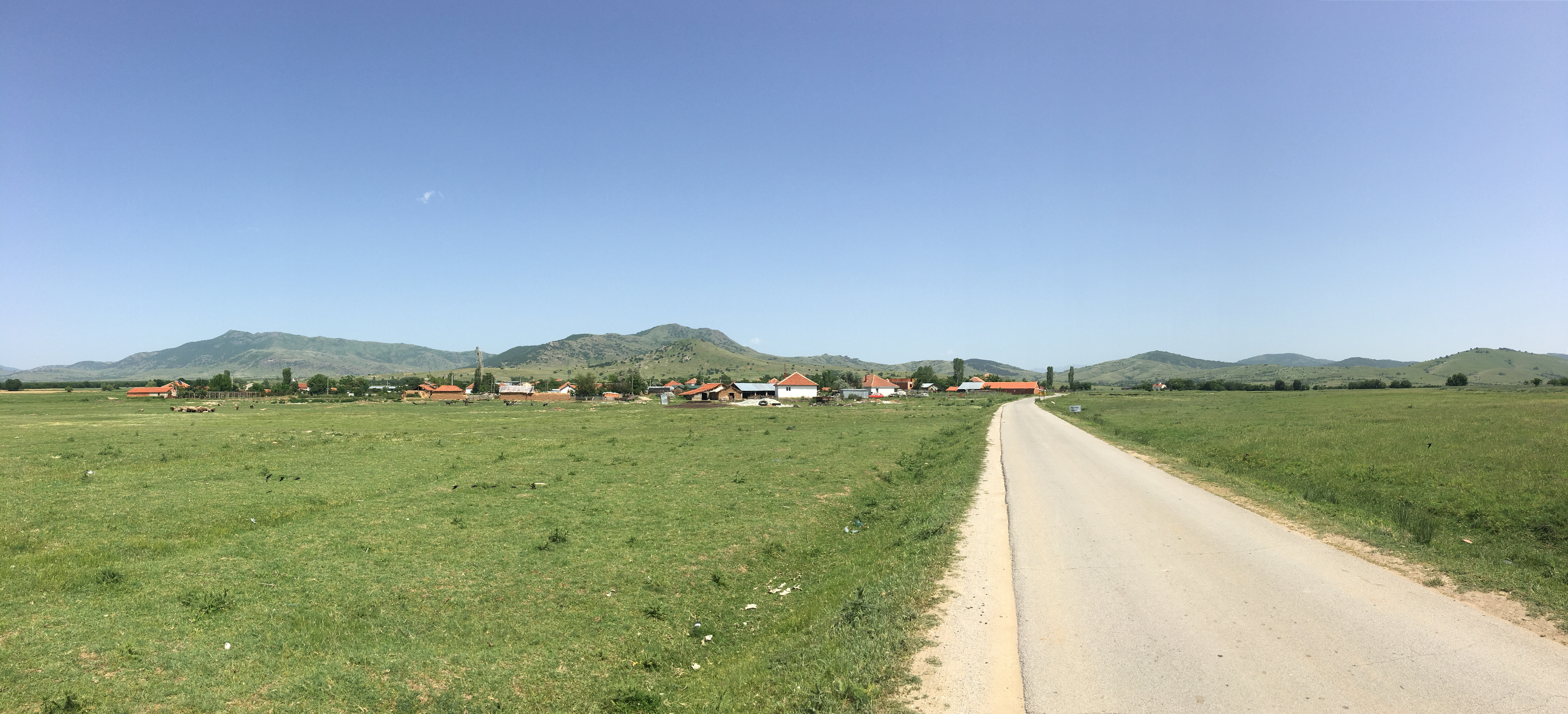
- Panoramic view of the village

- Location within North Macedonia
- Coordinates: 41°09′59″N 21°32′17″E
- Country: North Macedonia
- Region: Pelagonia
- Municipality: Mogila

Population (2002)
  - Total: 302
- Time zone: UTC+1 (CET)
  - Summer (DST): UTC+2 (CEST)
- Car plates: BT
- Website: .

Musinci (Macedonian: Мусинци, Turkish: Musaobası) is a village in the municipality of Mogila, North Macedonia. It used to be part of the former municipality of Dobruševo.

== Demographics ==
In the early Ottoman period, Musinci was one of several villages in the Pelagonia plain settled by nomadic Turkomen tribes from Anatolia during 1475–1543.

In statistics gathered by Vasil Kanchov in 1900, the village of Musinci was inhabited by of whom 450 people are Turks, 80 Bulgarian Christians and 10 Romani.

On the Ethnographic Map of the Bitola Vilayet of the Cartographic Institute in Sofia from 1901, Musinci appears as a mixed village of Bulgarians, Albanians and Turks in the Prilep Kaza of the Bitola Sanjak with 83 houses.

In the 1905 Austrian ethnographic map of the region of Macedonia, Musinci appears as being inhabited by an Exarchist Orthodox Macedonian Slavic majority as well as a Turkish Muslim and Orthodox Christian Albanian minority.

The Yugoslav census of 1953 recorded 1222 people of whom 1200 were Turks, 18 Macedonians, 1 Albanian and 3 others. The 1961 Yugoslav census recorded 575 people of whom 480 were Macedonians, 90 Turks, 4 Albanians and 7 others. The 1971 census recorded 396 people of whom 361 were Macedonians, 31 Turks, 1 Albanian and 3 others. The 1981 Yugoslav census recorded 388 people of whom 353 were Macedonians, 21 Turks, 13 Bosniaks and 2 others. The Macedonian census of 1994 recorded 309 people of whom 284 were Macedonians, 24 Turks and 1 Albanian.

According to the 2002 census, the village had a total of 302 inhabitants. Ethnic groups in the village include:

- Macedonians 284
- Turks 16
- Albanians 1
- Serbs 1
