= Crničani =

Crničani may refer to:

- Crničani, Dojran, North Macedonia
- Crničani, Mogila, North Macedonia
