= Loznani =

Loznani Лознани

- Location within North Macedonia
- Coordinates: 41°12′28″N 21°24′14″E
- Country: North Macedonia
- Region: Pelagonia
- Municipality: Mogila

Government
  - Mayor: Vladimir Taleski

Area
  - Total: 9 km^{2} (3.5 sq mi)
- Elevation: +600 m (2,000 ft)

Population (2002)
  - Total: 185
- Time zone: UTC+1 (CET)
- Area code: 389 047
- Patron saints: Saint Atanasije Veliki
- Website: http://www.bitola.gov.mk

Loznani (Macedonian: Лознани) is a village in North Macedonia. It is located in the Mogila municipality near the city of Bitola.

Loznani, pre-harvest with Selačka Planina in the background

== Origin of name ==
Loznani as mentioned in 1467 by an Ottoman the main features sighted in Loznani were the large presence of vineyards and swine, thus due to the large amount of vineyards in this village the villagers named it Loznani after the Macedonian word for vineyard being "Lozar or Loznica", hence the name Loznani.

== Location and demographics ==
Loznani is a small village located next to the Crna Reka (Black River) in the southern state of Bitola, but in the municipality of Mogila. The village is located in the central part of the Pelagonian valley, next to Selačka Planina (Village mountain, 777 m). Loznani is located 22 kilometres from Bitola and 19 kilometres from Prilep at 590–640 metres above sea level. The village is surrounded by mountains on both sides which exceed to 2200 metres. Loznani's coordinates are Longitude: 21 ° 24' 14" East Latitude: 41° 12' 28" North. The first mention of the village is in an Ottoman defter of 1467-8, which records seventy-four households and the presence of vineyards and swine. The population of Loznani as of 2002 was 185, all of whom were Macedonians.

== Economy ==
The economy of Loznani is primarily agricultural. Produce includes tobacco, milk (both sheep and cow), meats, and sunflower oil and seeds. A number of vineyards produce a quality wine. The largest agricultural export is wheat which is processed in the local mill.

The area of the village is 9 square kilometres. 563 hectares are arable, 215 hectares are grazing land, and 32 hectares are bush.

== Climate ==
The climate of Loznani, located in the Pelagonian Valley, brings air from the Mediterranean, creating a Mediterranean climate. Summers temperatures are hot, reaching 40 degrees Celsius with little rain. Winters are Continental, reaching -20 degrees with heavy precipitation.

== Sport ==
Loznani has a football team named "FK Hajduk Loznani" (Macedonian: ФК Хајдук Лознани).

Other sports include small and rarely big game hunting, swimming, fishing, basketball and many more.

== Attractions ==
Loznani offers many attractions to tourist which include:

- The church of Saint Atanasje Veliki: this magnificent white church is built semi-underground built in 1886 during the Ottoman Empire. The reason being built half underground was due to the reigning Turks telling the villagers of Loznani that if a church was to be built, it was to be built without it being able to be seen clearly by the Turks. The church also hold magnificent medieval Byzantine art full of beautiful icons of Mary, the burial of the Virgin Mary, the crucifixion, and many saints and martyrs. Alongside the church there is the church bell tower built at a height of 12 metres with tan and white bricks.

Inside Saint Atanasije veliki church and frescoes, 15th century

- Saints Cyril and Methodius monastery: The monastery of Saints Cyril and Methodius church is located at the south end of the village in the slopes of mount. Selačka at a height of 637 metres above sea level, only a few metres from the ancient ruins of the old church. It was built in the year of 1990 by a local villager by the name of Bisera Dimitrovska who was awakened by the Virgin Mary one night telling Bisera that she was to build a monastery next to the site of the old church of Saint Cyril and Methodius where the ancient spring is. This Monastery will serve as a purpose to women who are unable to conceive children.

After many years of construction and furnishing it has become a well known monastery not only in Macedonia but in the Balkans where women come to pray in the church and drink the holy water from the church tap where the water of the ancient spring flows and has flowed for many generations non-stop. Today the monastery has become a massive highlight of the village where many festivals are held, church services and many other religious ceremonies and a gathering for the villagers to have conversation and for the women to cook in the monastery hall.

The church has one tower in the middle and a 3-D golden crucifix which can be seen at all angles. In the church tower a massive icon of Jesus Christ overlooks the people in the church and wonderful depictions of the Virgin Mary, Christ and many saints.

- Saints Cyril and Methodius monastery tap: Fed by the underground springs from the mountain the monastery tap is built at the old opening of the spring. This wonderful Tap is decorated with a large cross on top, a fresco of the Virgin Mary with baby Jesus and a cavity or square hole where a fresco of saint George killing the devil and a small sand pit in that area for a candle to be lit and left as a prayer to the saint.
