= Nošpal =

Nošpal Ношпал
- Village
- Location within North Macedonia
- Coordinates: 41.183319°N 21.451108°E
- Country: North Macedonia
- Region: Pelagonia
- Municipality: Mogila

Population (2002)
  - Total: 348
- Time zone: UTC+1 (CET)
  - Summer (DST): UTC+2 (CEST)
- Website: .

Nošpal (Macedonian: Ношпал) is a village in the municipality of Mogila, North Macedonia. It used to be part of the former municipality of Dobruševo.

The name of the village is related to its history. Nošpal comes from the Macedonian word for knife "нож" and thumb "палец", according to the legend, the people who first settled Noshpal were Peonians from Mariovo and Mijak tribes from western Macedonia who were shepherds and during the slaughter of animals the people used knives only to kill the animal, the rest of the process was done with hands, thus their skills are engraved in the name of the village Nošpal.

== Demographics ==
According to the 2002 census, the village had a total of 348 inhabitants. Ethnic groups in the village include:

- Macedonians 347
- Others 1
