= Crničani, Mogila =

Crničani Црничани
- Village
- Location within North Macedonia
- Coordinates: 41.124419°N 21.539464°E
- Country: North Macedonia
- Region: Pelagonia
- Municipality: Mogila

Population (2002)
  - Total: 41
- Time zone: UTC+1 (CET)
  - Summer (DST): UTC+2 (CEST)
- Website: .

Crničani (Macedonian: Црничани) is a small village in the municipality of Mogila, North Macedonia. It used to be part of the former municipality of Dobruševo.

== Demographics ==
According to the 2002 census, the village had a total of 41 inhabitants. Ethnic groups in the village include:

- Macedonians 41
