= Aleksandar Turundzhev =

Bulgarian revolutionary (1872–1905)

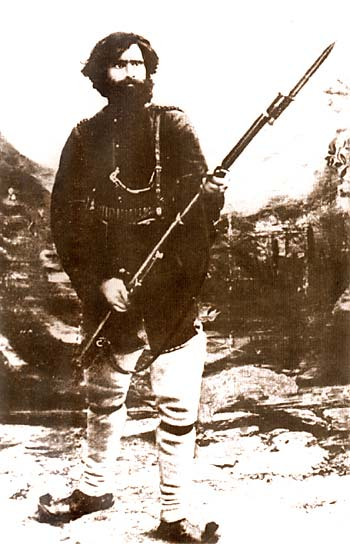
- Aleksandar Turundzhev in 1900
- Born: 1872; Gorno Varbeni, Ottoman Empire
- Died: 30 August 1905; Bitola, Ottoman Empire

Aleksandar Turundzhev (Bulgarian: Александър Турунджев; Macedonian: Александар Турунџев, romanized: Aleksandar Turundžev; 1872–1905) was a Bulgarian revolutionary from Ottoman Macedonia and leader (voyvoda) of the Lerin cheta of the Internal Macedonian Adrianople Revolutionary Organization.

== Life ==
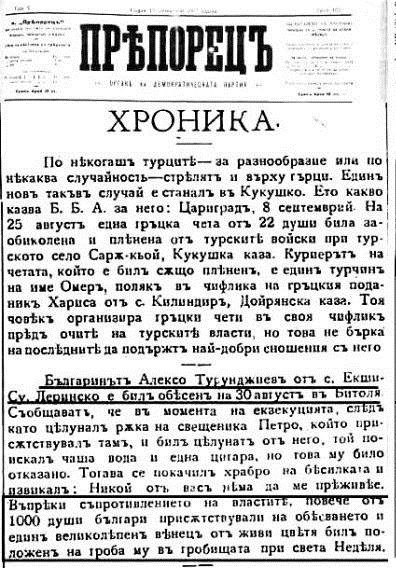
Report of the hanging of the Bulgarian Turundzhev in the newspaper Pryaporets.

He was born in 1872 in the village of Gorno Varbeni in Monastir Vilayet (today Xino Nero in Amyntaio, Greece). He joined the IMARO while he was young as a rebel and took part in terrorist operations. Starting in 1902 he was under the command of the Bulgarian officer Georgi Papanchev, but after his death in May, by June 1903 he became a voyvoda of the cheta in Florina (Lerin).

=== Ilinden–Preobrazhenie Uprising ===
In the time of the Ilinden Uprising he played a big part in the battles in the territory around Lerin. During all the years of illegal residence and movement, Turundzhev regularly surrounded the villages in Lerin and some in Lower Prespa and Bitola (Monastir).

After the decision to begin a rebellion on the Salonica Congress of IMARO and its confirmation on the Smilevo Congress, Turundzhev was given the task to organize his own village and prepare it for the uprising.

When finished with the military training of his fellow villagers of all ages, but mostly aged 20–25 years, Turundzhev with all of them, about 230 people, made a training, organized several Thalia (maneuver) with that in the improvised clashes between insurgents. During the Ilinden Uprising in Lerin was fulfilled the directive given on the Smilevo Congress for guerrilla mode of warfare. Turundzhev mobilized a total of 500 fighters, including 100 rebels from his native village.

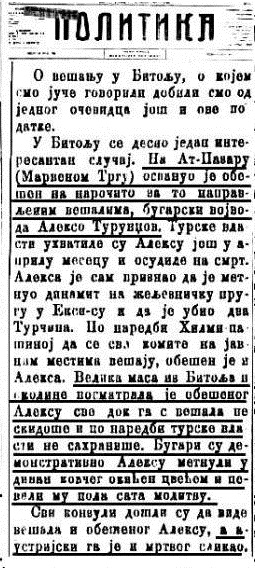
The Serbian newspaper Politika, describing the death of the "Bulgarian vojvoda".

Ottoman commanders drafted a detailed plan of the counteroffensive against Macedono-Bulgarian revolutionary, rebel units. To stop the uprising, the vilayet authorities made a decision to accommodate a new unit in the village of Turundzhev on 14 November 1903.

The presence of the Ottoman units did not scare the IMRO members of Ekshi su, and it did not stop the organization's activity of Turundzhev, who began a reconstruction of the revolutionary network in his region.

=== Death ===
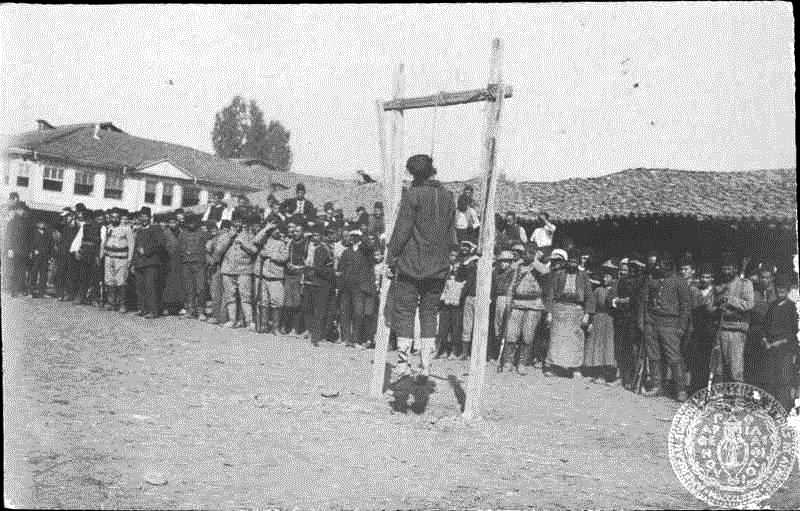
The hanging of Turundzhev

In the aftermath of the Ilinden Uprising (1903) the Ottomans persecuted Exarchists. At Aetos, a village of the Florina area, an Orthodox notable Nikolaos Vannis and the village priest Papa Alexis conspired with Ottoman authorities to trap Turundzhev, a figure hostile to the Patriarchist cause. Turundzhev was arrested on 6 April 1904 by Ottoman soldiers at the home of Vannis. Local Patriarchists received the news of his capture with relief. In Monastir (modern Bitola) Turundzhev was imprisoned for over a year and later hanged on 12 September 1905 at the town marketplace. According to the British Consul in Thessaloniki, Robert Graves, the same day several thousand citizens followed the coffin, which was covered with wreaths from the Bulgarian Church congregation. His grave is in the cemeteries Saint Nedela in Bitola, North Macedonia.

=== Family ===
Turundzhev's grandson, Ilias Turundjiev was a prominent communist involved in separatist and anti–Greek activities who formed the Kastoria and Florina Regiment composed of Slavic Macedonians from Greece in World War Two. Another relative of Turundzhev was Giorgos Touroundzias (Turundjiev), the leader for the Florina branch of the Slavic Macedonian National Liberation Front (NOF).
