= Andreas Tsipas =

Greek Communist leader

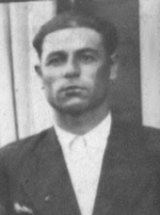

General Secretary of the Communist Party of Greece
- In office July 1941 – September 1941

Personal details
- Born: 1904 Patele, Ottoman Empire (now Agios Panteleimonas, Florina, Greece)
- Died: 1956 (aged 51–52) Bitola, Yugoslavia
- Party: Communist Party of Greece

Andreas Tsipas (Greek: Ανδρέας Τσίπας; Macedonian: Андреjа Чипов, romanized: Andreja Čipov; Bulgarian: Андрей Чипов, romanized: Andrey Chipov; 1904–1956) was a Slavic Macedonian leader of the Greek Communist Party during the Second World War.

== Biography ==
Andreas Tsipas was from Agios Panteleimonas. He was a Slavic Macedonian. In the interwar period, Tsipas was a member of IMRO (United) in Greek Macedonia, part of its left–wing faction and supported autonomy for Macedonia. Tsipas became a member of the Central Committee of the Communist Party of Greece (KKE). He was a KKE candidate in the last pre-war Greek legislative elections in 1936.

In the KKE, Tsipas was pro–Bulgarian. Between 1935 and 1941, he was imprisoned at Acronauplia prison. In June 1941, the Bulgarians secured his release. Tsipas was one of 27 communist prisoners released from the Acronauplia at the request of the Bulgarian embassy in Athens with the intercession of Bulgarian Club in Thessaloniki, which had made representations to the German occupation authorities. With the permission from the leader of KKE Giannis Ioannides to reconstruct the Greek Communist Party, they all declared Bulgarian ethnicity. Some merely pretended to be a Bulgarian in order to be set free, such as Andreas Tzimas who was a Greek Vlach, Petros Kentros of Arvanite and Vlach descent, etc.

After his release, Tsipas followed orders from the KKE leadership and worked with Tzimas to form local committees in Athens. Tsipas and others set about reorganising the decimated KKE. Along with Andreas Tzimas and Kostas Lazaridis, also released from prison, and Petros Rousos, Pandelis Karankitzis and Chrysa Hatzivasileiou constituted themselves as a new central committee. For a brief period Tsipas became leader of the KKE as its secretary–general. The role was given to him at a meeting in July 1941, subsequently named as the VI Plenum by the KKE. This new central committee succeeded in winning the recognition of the "old central committee" and the "provisional leadership" wings of the party.

At the VII Plenum of the central committee, held the following September, Tsipas was relieved of his post owing to "political unreliability". He had disputes with several high ranking leaders of the KKE. Tsipas was careless in security terms and abused alcohol. One account claims that after running up a bill in a bar, he sent the barman to the secret meeting place of the politburo, where someone was expected to pay his bill. After the removal from his post, he was isolated. During the occupation of Greece, he was arrested by Greek authorities and the Italians handed Tsipas over to the Bulgarians. Later he left for Bulgaria through the assistance of the Bulgarian Club of Thessaloniki and the organisation Ohrana.

In January 1942, he sought refuge in Sofia, where he remained for eight months. According to some sources then he was an agent of the Bulgarian secret service. In 1944, Tsipas through the National Liberation Front (NOF) returned and was present in Yugoslav Macedonia at the conclusion of the Second World War.

During the Greek Civil War, he was active in the (NOF) working as a nurse. After the defeat of the Democratic Army of Greece, he fled to SFRY in the Socialist Republic of Macedonia, in the city of Bitola, where he died in 1956, suffering from alcoholism.
