= Dolna Čarlija =

Dolna Čarlija Долна Чарлија
- Village
- Location within North Macedonia
- Coordinates: 41.140913°N 21.437627°E
- Country: North Macedonia
- Region: Pelagonia
- Municipality: Mogila

Population (2002)
  - Total: 198
- Time zone: UTC+1 (CET)
  - Summer (DST): UTC+2 (CEST)
- Website: .

Dolna Čarlija (Macedonian: Долна Чарлија) is a village in the municipality of Mogila, North Macedonia.

== Demographics ==
According to the 2002 census, the village had a total of 198 inhabitants. Ethnic groups in the village include:

- Macedonians 197
- Serbs 1
