= Mirka Ginova =

Communist partisan (1916–1946)

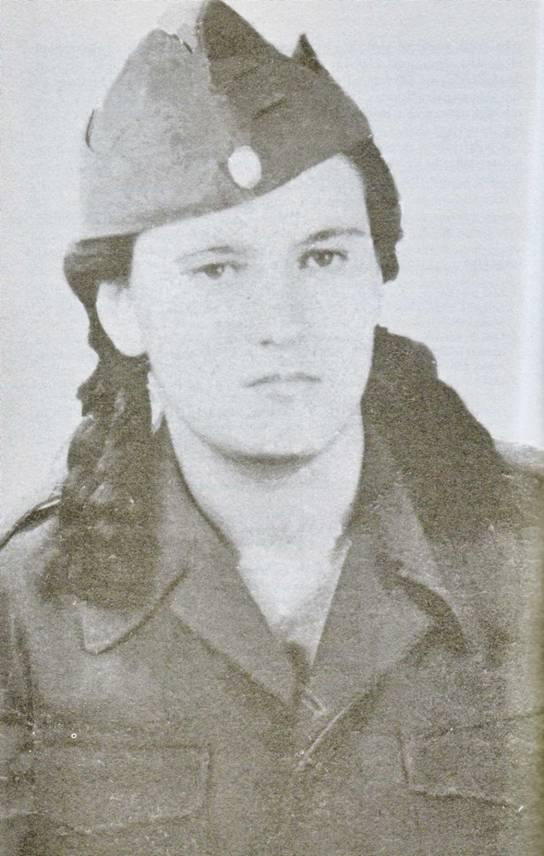
- Born: 1916; Rusilovo near Vodena, Greece
- Died: 26 July 1946 (aged 29/30); Giannitsa, Greece
- Cause of death: Execution by firing squad
- Other name: Irini Gini
- Occupations: Teacher, partisan

Mirka Ginova (Macedonian: Мирка Гинова), also known as Irini/Eirini Gini (Greek: Ειρήνη Γκίνη; 1916 – 26 July 1946), was a Slavic Macedonian communist partisan and teacher during World War II and Greek Civil War. She was the first woman to receive capital punishment in Greece.

== Biography ==
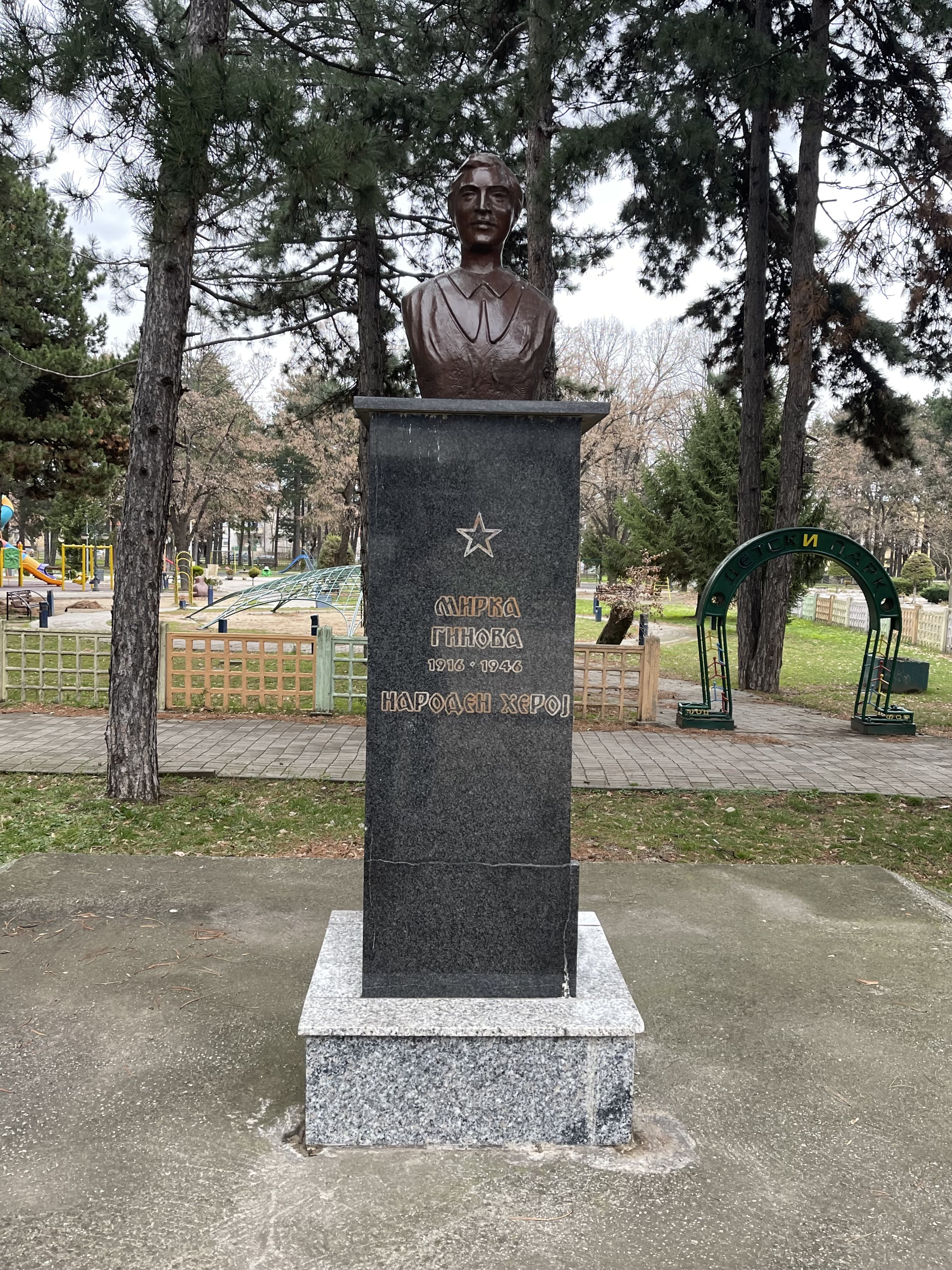
Bust of Ginova in Bitola

Ginova was born in a pro-Bulgarian family in the village of Rusilovo (now Xanthogeia), near Vodena (now Edessa), Greece, in 1916. In the 1930s, she attended the Kastoria Nursery School Teachers' Academy. Ginova joined the Young Communist League of Greece in 1943. She was also a member of the Greek People's Liberation Army (ELAS). While three members of her family joined the Bulgarian Club of Thessaloniki, she joined the Communist Party of Greece (KKE). In April 1945, she was appointed as a teacher at a nursery school in Arnissa and joined a local National Liberation Front's (NOF) committee. The right-wing village council had her removed for "unseemly conduct" and alleged complicity in a murder of two brothers, and she fled to avoid arrest. After the Greek Civil War broke out in 1946, she joined a guerrilla group of NOF. Ginova was captured by the Greek army and sentenced to death by the military court in Giannitsa. KKE campaigned to have her sentence commuted. Despite the campaign, she was executed by a firing squad on 26 July 1946. She was the first woman in Greece to be executed. Her memory has been honored in North Macedonia and among the Greek leftists. A bust of her is in Bitola.

== See also ==
- Slavic speakers of Greek Macedonia
