= Radobor =

Radobor Радобор
- Village
- Location within North Macedonia
- Coordinates: 41.118854°N 21.442500°E
- Country: North Macedonia
- Region: Pelagonia
- Municipality: Mogila

Population (2002)
  - Total: 145
- Time zone: UTC+1 (CET)
  - Summer (DST): UTC+2 (CEST)
- Website: .

Radobor (Macedonian: Радобор) is a village in the municipality of Mogila, in the Pelagonia statistical region of North Macedonia.

== Demographics ==
According to the 2002 census, the village had a total of 145 inhabitants. Ethnic groups in the village include:

- Macedonians 145
