= Podino =

Podino Подино
- Village
- Location within North Macedonia
- Coordinates: 41.217972°N 21.342657°E
- Country: North Macedonia
- Region: Pelagonia
- Municipality: Mogila

Population (2002)
  - Total: 51
- Time zone: UTC+1 (CET)
  - Summer (DST): UTC+2 (CEST)
- Website: .

Podino (Macedonian: Подино) is a village in the municipality of Mogila, North Macedonia.

== Demographics ==
Podino is attested in the Ottoman defter of 1467/68 as a village in the vilayet of Manastir. The overwhelming majority of the inhabitants attested bore typical Slavic anthroponyms, with one instance of an individual bearing the name Miho Arbanaš, Arbanas being a medieval Slavic rendering for Albanian.

According to the 2002 census, the village had a total of 51 inhabitants. Ethnic groups in the village include:

- Macedonians 48
- Romani 3
