= Dimche Sarvanov =

Bulgarian revolutionary

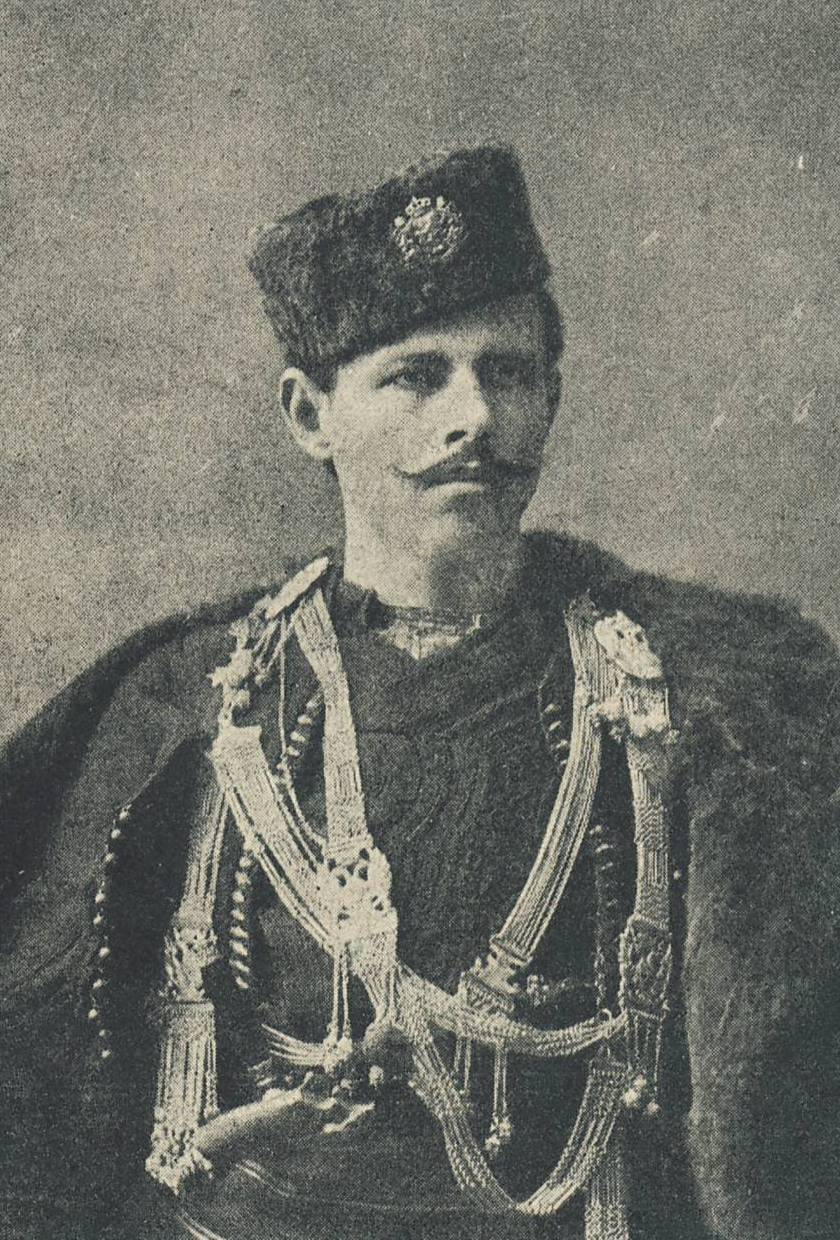
- Born: 1879; Mogila, Ottoman Empire
- Died: January 4, 1908 (aged 28–29); Nošpal, Ottoman Empire
- Other name: Dimche Mogilcheto (Димче Могилчето)
- Movement: Internal Macedonian Revolutionary Organization

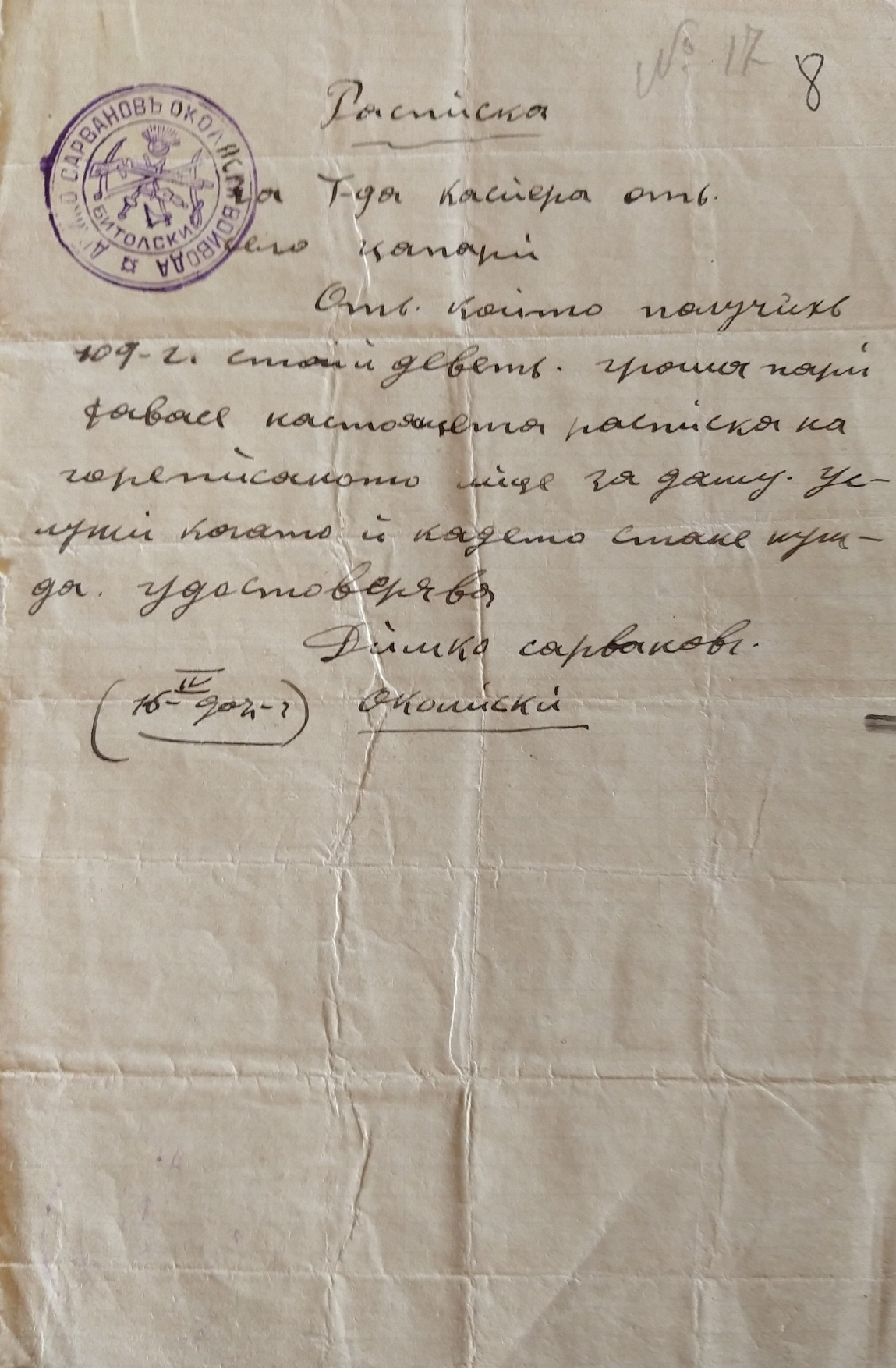
Document issued by Sarvanov on 16 April 1902; (In Bulgarian language).

Dimche Sarvanov, also Dimko Mogilcheto or Dimche Mogilche (Bulgarian/Macedonian: Димче Сарванов; 1879 –January 4, 1908), was a Macedonian Bulgarian revolutionary and a member of the Internal Macedonian-Adrianople Revolutionary Organization.

Sarvanov was born in Mogila (now in the North Macedonia) in 1879. He joined Georgi Sugarev's group within IMRO, and fought against Ottoman rule in the Bitola and Mariovo districts. During the Ilinden–Preobrazhenie Uprising, Sarvanov fought in the Pelister and Prespa districts. After the death of Sugarev, Sarvanov continued fighting "Greek propaganda".

On January 4, 1908, Sarvanov fell into an Ottoman ambush in the village of Nošpal, which is close to Bitola in present-day North Macedonia, and rather than allowing himself to fall into Ottoman hands, committed suicide.

He was buried in the cemetery in the yard of the then Bulgarian Exarchate Church "Sveta Nedelya" in Bitola.
