= Vegora, Florina =

Vegora Βέγορα
- Community
- Location within Greece
- Coordinates: 40°40′49″N 21°42′53″E
- Country: Greece
- Geographic region: Macedonia
- Administrative region: Western Macedonia
- Regional unit: Florina
- Municipality: Amyntaio
- Municipal unit: Filotas

Population (2021)
  - Community: 392
- Time zone: UTC+2 (EET)
  - Summer (DST): UTC+3 (EEST)

Vegora (Greek: Βέγορα, before 1926: Νέογραδ – Neograd) is a village in Florina Regional Unit, Macedonia, Greece.

The 1920 Greek census recorded 800 people in the village, and 800 inhabitants (170 families) were Muslim in 1923. Following the Greek–Turkish population exchange, Greek refugee families in Neograd were from Asia Minor (24) and Pontus (58) in 1926. The 1928 Greek census recorded 315 village inhabitants. In 1928, the refugee families numbered 89 (308 people).

Vegora had 469 inhabitants in 1981. In fieldwork done by anthropologist Riki Van Boeschoten in late 1993, Vegora was populated by a Greek population descended from Anatolian Greek refugees who arrived during the population exchange. Pontic Greek was spoken in the village by people over 30 in public and private settings. Children understood the language, but mostly did not use it.

In the late 1990s, the water levels of Lake Vegoritida decreased and new land became exposed for cultivation. The land became the centre of an ownership dispute, involving sometimes violent incidents with the neighbouring village of Agios Panteleimonas. Tensions between Greece and the Republic of Macedonia affected the situation as Vegora, populated by Pontic Greeks and other Greeks, was supported by government authorities in Florina over Agios Panteleimonas, a Slavophone village.
