= Agios Panteleimonas, Florina =

Agios Panteleimonas Άγιος Παντελεήμονας
- Community
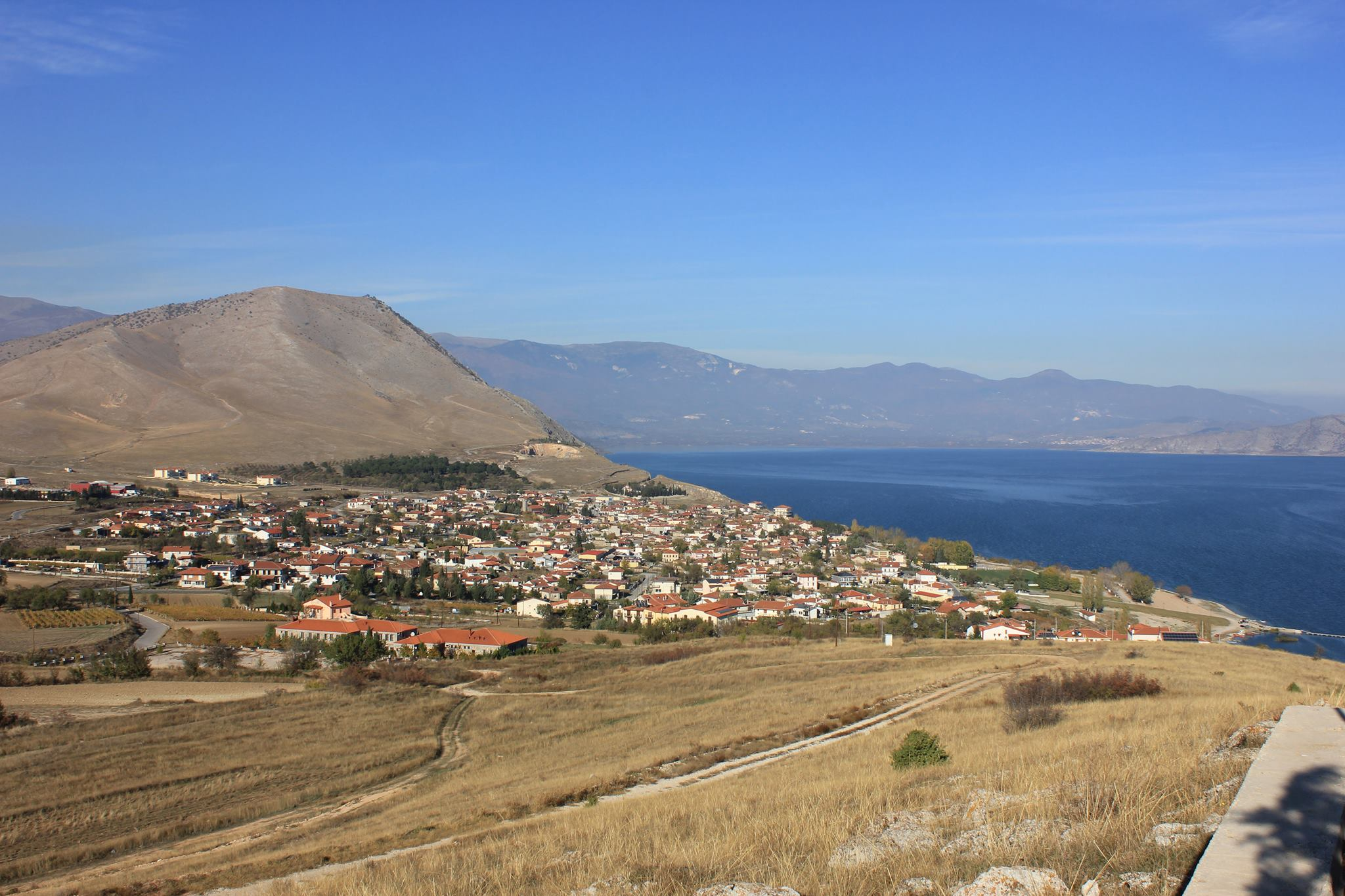
- Agios Panteleimonas and Lake Vegoritida

- Location within Greece
- Coordinates: 40°43′26″N 21°44′54″E
- Country: Greece
- Administrative region: Western Macedonia
- Regional unit: Florina
- Municipality: Amyntaio
- Municipal unit: Amyntaio

Population (2021)
  - Community: 784
- Time zone: UTC+2 (EET)
  - Summer (DST): UTC+3 (EEST)

Agios Panteleimonas (Greek: Άγιος Παντελεήμονας, before 1926: Πάτελι – Pateli, also: Πάτελε, Patele; Macedonian: Пателе, Patele) is a village in the Florina Regional Unit in West Macedonia, Greece. It is located on Lake Vegoritida. The village has vineyards and is the centre of wine production in the wider area.

A hill in the village is the site of an ancient Hellenistic period settlement and archaeological artifacts recovered from the area are dated to the time of King Philip II of Macedon.

In an Ottoman document of the 15th century, Pateli is recorded as an old Christian village. Toward the end of the 15th century, the village had 47 inhabitants and was a hass (an estate with revenue) of the sultan. The church of St. Pandeleimon was built in 1729. The modern new Greek name of the village is derived from the church.

In the early 19th century, Pateli had the continued status of a hass and was located in the kaza (district) of Monastir. In the early 20th century, many villagers immigrated abroad to the USA. The village participated in the Ilinden Uprising (1903) and during the conflict it was razed by the Ottoman army. The population numbered 1,800 in 1912. The village was pro–Bulgarian and had Internal Macedonian Revolutionary Organization (IMRO) members among its population.

Agios Panteleimonas was a Slavic Macedonian village. During the occupation of Greece in the Second World War and in the Greek Civil War the village supported the separatist side and retaliation followed from supporters of the Greek side. In May 1947, a Slavic Macedonian communist affiliated guerilla band from Verno mountains attacked Agios Panteleimonas. The band tortured villagers who were against them such as the priest Evangelos Deligiannis (of Greek refugee origin) who was killed.

Agios Panteleimonas had 1068 inhabitants in 1981. In fieldwork done by anthropologist Riki Van Boeschoten in late 1993, Agios Panteleimonas was populated by Slavophones. The Macedonian language was spoken in the village by people over 30 in public and private settings. Children understood the language, but mostly did not use it.

In the late 1990s, villagers increasingly were unable to fish and traditional livelihoods became impacted as the water levels of Lake Vegoritida decreased. A large number of people in Agios Panteleimonas were landless and the shrinking lake exposed new land for cultivation, viewed as a solution to the situation. The land became the centre of an ownership dispute, involving sometimes violent incidents with the neighbouring village of Vegora (populated by Pontic Greeks and other Greeks). Tensions between Greece and the Republic of Macedonia affected the situation as Vegora was supported by government authorities in Florina over Agios Panteleimonas, a Slavophone village. In the early 21st century, the modern village population is in decline.

== Notable people ==
- Andreas Tsipas (1904–1956), communist leader
