= National Liberation Front (Macedonia) =

Slavic Macedonian organization in Greece

National Liberation Front Народноослободителен фронт
- Abbreviation: NOF
- Leaders: Paskal Mitrevski
- Founded: 1945
- Preceded by: SNOF
- Merged into: Democratic Army of Greece (1946)
- Ideology: Republicanism; Communism; Anti-fascism ethnic Macedonian minority interests Macedonian nationalism
- Political position: left-wing to far-left
- Religion: Secularism

The National Liberation Front or the People's Liberation Front (Macedonian: Народноослободителен фронт [НОФ], Narodnoosloboditelen front [NOF]), also known by its acronym NOF, was a left-wing political and military organization created by the Slavic Macedonian minority in Greece in 1945. In 1946, during the Greek Civil War, NOF was merged into the Democratic Army of Greece, which was founded by the Communist Party of Greece.

Nepokoren was one of the newspapers published by NOF.

== Background ==
=== Late Ottoman era ===
The Macedonian Question surfaced in 1878, after the Treaty of Berlin had revised the short-lived Greater Bulgaria established by the Treaty of San Stefano and turned back Macedonia under Ottoman control. During rise of nationalism in the Ottoman Empire, the Slavic speakers in Ottoman Macedonia were under the influence of the Bulgarian, Greek and Serbian religious, educational and military propaganda. Even the Macedonian nationalist movement hardly started its activity in the late 19th century. However at that time and beyond, the majority of the Macedonian Slavs who had clear ethnic consciousness, believed they were Bulgarians.

=== Interwar Greece ===
The Balkan Wars (1912–1913) and World War I (1914–1918) left the area divided mainly between Greece and Serbia (later Yugoslavia), which resulted in significant changes in its ethnic composition. The formerly leading Bulgarian community was reduced either by population exchanges or by change of communities' ethnic identity. Part of the Treaty of Neuilly-sur-Seine in 1919 was a population exchange Convention, signed between Bulgaria and Greece. In 1924 upon the League of Nations' demand, a Bulgarian-Greek agreement was signed, known as the Politis–Kalfov Protocol, which recognized the Greek Slavophones as Bulgarians and guaranteed their protection. Belgrade was suspicious of Greece's recognition of a Bulgarian minority and was annoyed this would hinder its policy of Serbianisation in Vardar Macedonia. On February 2, 1925, the Greek parliament, claiming pressure from the Kingdom of Yugoslavia, which threatened to renounce the Greek–Serbian Alliance of 1913, refused to ratify the agreement, that lasted until June 10, 1925. In 1927, Mollov–Kafantaris Agreement was signed that dealt with the financial issues related to the liquidation of the Bulgarians' properties in Greece and the Greeks' in Bulgaria.

During the Metaxas regime the Greek government began promulgating a policy of persecution of the use of Slavic dialects both in public and in private, as well of expressions of any cultural or ethnic distinctiveness. At that time a new consciousness arrived among the Slavic-speaking population – an ethnic Macedonian one. The first organization that promoted in 1932 the existence of a separate ethnic Macedonian nation was IMRO (United), composed of former left-wing Internal Macedonian Revolutionary Organization (IMRO) members. This idea was backed by the Comintern, which issued a resolution in 1934, supporting the development of Macedonia as a separate entity and recognizing a Macedonian nationality. This action was attacked by the IMRO, but was supported by the Balkan communists, including the Greek Communist Party. It created a Macedonian section within the party, headed by Andreas Tsipas and maintained the national consolidation of the Slav Macedonian minority within Greece.

=== World War II ===
==== Occupation of Greece in World War II ====
Nevertheless, most of the Macedonian Slavs in all parts of divided Macedonia, still had strong pro-Bulgarian sentiments at the beginning of the Occupation. Tsipas himself declared Bulgarian ethnicity during the Second World War, sought refuge in Sofia, and became an agent of the Bulgarian secret service. More, until the end of the Second World War, the Macedonian peasants, being neither communists nor members of IMRO (United), were not affected by the Macedonian national identity. Bulgarian withdrawal from Northern Greece after the pro-Communist coup in the country on 9 September 1944 led to that, ca. 90,000 Bulgarians left the area, nearly the half of them locals.

While most of Greece was occupied by Axis powers in World War II, resistance movements were created by Greeks while the collaborationist Ohrana battalions were constituted from among the Slavophone population. After Greece was occupied by Italy, Germany and Bulgaria, different guerrilla bands and movements were formed across all of northern Greece,. Some of them fought against the occupation, like Napoleon Zervas and his National Republican Greek League (EDES), while others were collaborationists, like the Ohrana, some of whom later joined the SNOF. Greek People's Liberation Army (ELAS), EAM's partisan army headed by the Communist Party of Greece (KKE), was the largest resistance organisation. Ethnic Macedonians sympathized with ELAS and the KKE because of their friendly position towards the ethnic minorities of Greece.

==== Ohrana ====
The Ohrana (Bulgarian: Охрана, "Protection" or "Guards") were armed collaborationist detachments organized by the Bulgarian army, composed of Slavophone pro-Bulgarian people in occupied Greek Macedonia during World War II and led by Bulgarian officers. Bulgaria was interested in acquiring Thessalonica and Western Macedonia under Axis occupation and hoped to sway the allegiance of the 80,000 Slavs who lived there at the time. The appearance of Greek partisans in those areas persuaded the Italians to allow the formation of these collaborationist detachments, which Veremis and Koliopoulos describe as "Bulgarian fascist Ohrana paramilitary forces" that, together with the occupying army, intimidated the local population.

Following the defeat of the Axis powers, many members of the Ohrana joined the SNOF, where they could still pursue their goal of Macedonian autonomy. Cowan and Voigt both describe this as a rapprochement, with collaboration between the Bulgarian-controlled Ohrana and the EAM-controlled SNOF following an agreement on Macedonian autonomy, and Kophos states that entire Ohrana units transferred to the SNOF, which then pressed the ELAS leadership to allow it autonomous action in Greek Macedonia. Mazower similarly notes that wartime Ohrana members were quick to join the Slavic-speaking units under EAM's jurisdiction to avoid post-occupation prosecution for collaboration.

== SNOF ==
Slav-Macedonian People's Liberation Front SNOF
- Active: 1943–1944
- Country: Greece (Greek Macedonia)
- Allegiance: Greek People's Liberation Army
- Engagements: Greek Resistance

The Slav-Macedonian People's Liberation Front (Macedonian: Славјаномакедонски народноослободителен фронт [СНОФ], Slavjanomakedonski narodnoosloboditelen front [SNOF]), also known by its acronym SNOF, was the first paramilitary organization established by ethnic Macedonian members of the Communist Party of Greece (KKE) in 1943. Before the creation of SNOF, ethnic Macedonian military detachments in Greek Macedonia participated in the Greek People's Liberation Army.

=== Slav-Macedonian People's Liberation Front ===
The main aim of the SNOF was to obtain the support of the local population and to mobilize it, through SNOF, to help the National Liberation Front of Greece (EAM) liberate the country from Axis occupation. As they increased in numbers, the military detachments of the SNOF fought the occupation in Northern Greece and collaborated with units of the KKE. Another tactic of SNOF was to struggle against the Ohrana activity in western Macedonia, and to persuade the Ohrana members to desert their ranks and join the SNOF and support ELAS. SNOF started publishing newspapers and booklets on ethnic Macedonian history and engaged a massive propaganda war against the Ohrana. Just before the liberation of Greece, SNOF operatives managed to convince many former Ohranists to enter the ranks of the SNOF. Some of them later took part in the Greek Civil War on the side of the Democratic Army of Greece (DSE) and gave their lives in the struggle. By 1944 SNOF had begun to publish a regular newspaper known as Slavjano-Makedonski Glas (Macedonian: Славјано-Македонски Глас).

During this time, the ethnic Macedonians in Greece were permitted to publish newspapers in Macedonian and run schools. After the end of the Greek Resistance against the Axis occupation, SNOF was dissolved in 1944 on the orders of the KKE Central Committee and through British intervention. Headed by Vangel Ajanovski - Oche, some SNOF commanders, dissatisfied with the KKE decision, crossed into Vardar Macedonia and participated in the National Liberation War of Macedonia.

== NOF ==
=== Socialist Republic of Macedonia as part of Yugoslavia ===
The turning point for the Macedonian ethnogenesis became the creation of the Socialist Republic of Macedonia as part of the Socialist Federal Republic of Yugoslavia following World War II. Then the idea of an ethnic Macedonian conscience and identity gained momentum and ethnic Macedonian institutions were created in the three parts of Macedonia. The new People's Republic of Bulgaria and the Socialist Federal Republic of Yugoslavia began a policy of making the region of Macedonia a connecting link for the establishment of new Balkan Communist Federation and also supported the development of a distinct ethnic Macedonian consciousness in the area. The Greek communists as well, were then the only political party in Greece to recognize Macedonian national identity.

=== Foundation of NOF in 1945 and first actions ===
After the liberation of Greece and the signing of the Treaty of Varkiza in February 1945, there was no sign of possible political stabilization of the country. The Communist-led forces become isolated from the process, and British intervention backed the right-wing government formed in Athens. After the ELAS was partly disarmed, the KKE and its forces concentrated on political struggle. But while the KKE was negotiating and fighting within the political framework, in northern Greece bands of the former Security Battalions (wartime collaborators) and government forces harassed the ethnic Macedonians, accusing them of autonomist activities.

A number of ethnic Macedonians in Edessa, Kastoria and Florina, Paskal Mitrevski, Mihail Keramidzhiev, Georgi Urdov, Atanas Koroveshov, Pavle Rakovski and Mincho Fotev, formed the National Liberation Front on 23 April 1945. According to its statute, their objectives were: to resist the "Monarchist-Fascist aggressors", to fight for democracy and a Greek Republic; and the physical preservation of the ethnic Macedonian population. However, according to Stathis Kalyvas, as far as its ruling cadres were concerned its participation in the Greek Civil War was nationalist rather than communist, with the goal of secession from Greece.

The NOF organised meetings, street and factory protests, and published illegal papers. The ethnic Macedonian KKE members who escaped Greece when the country was liberated started coming back to their homes, and many entered the ranks of NOF. Soon the group began forming partisan detachments. Even before the KKE declared the beginning of the armed struggle of the Democratic Army of Greece in 1946, the NOF was acting independently from the KKE, and engaged in several battles with government forces, who had British support. Thus, the NOF stimulated the beginning of an armed insurrection of the communist forces against the government. NOF also created regional committees in all areas with compact ethnic Macedonian populations (Florina, Edessa, Giannitsa and Kastoria).

=== NOF merged into the DSE ===
KKE was trying to avoid the Civil War until after the elections of 1946. Up to this time more than 100,000 fighters of ELAS and EAM members had been imprisoned with accusations of treason and brutalities against civilians during the fascist occupation. Many ELAS and NOF members created small armed groups based in their former hideouts. Among the areas populated with Slavic speaking population in western Greek Macedonia the NOF became a powerful factor, and the KKE opened negotiations with it. The negotiations were conducted by Mihail Keramitčiev and Paskal Mitrevski on behalf of the NOF, and Markos Vafiadis, on behalf of the Democratic Army of Greece (DSE). After nearly seven months of negotiations, they reached an agreement to merge. In October 1946, KKE founded DSE High Command in Middle Greece. The Capetanios (Military and Political Leader) of DSE was Markos Vafeiadis. KKE and NOF maintained a position on the minorities question in Greece (the equality of all ethnic groups within the borders of Greece), and NOF was against every form of autonomy. Owing to the KKE's equal treatment of ethnic Macedonians and Greeks, many ethnic Macedonians enlisted as volunteers in the DSE.

=== Greek Civil War ===
At the beginning of the war Markos Vafiadis had an efficient guerilla strategy, and controlled territories from Florina to Attica, and for a short period there were DSE-controlled territories in the Peloponnese. Ethnic Macedonian partisans were not fighting only in the territory of Greek Macedonia, but also in Thessaly, Roúmeli, and in the battles north of Athens. The ethnic Macedonians of Greek Macedonia made a critical contribution to the communist side during the Greek Civil War. Soon after the first free territories were created, Keramitčiev met with KKE officials, and it was decided that Macedonian schools would open in the area controlled by the DSE. Books written in Macedonian were published, while Macedonians theatres and cultural organizations operated. Under the auspices of the NOF, a women's organization, the Antifascist Women's Front (AFZH), and a youth organization, the National Liberation Front of Youth (ONOM), were formed. Newspapers and books were published by NOF, public speeches made and the schools opened, helping the consolidation of Macedonian conscience and identity among the population. According to information announced by Paskal Mitrevski on the I plenum of NOF in August 1948, about 85% of the Macedonian-speaking population in Aegean Macedonia identified themselves as ethnic Macedonian. The language that was taught in the schools was the official language of the Socialist Republic of Macedonia. About 20,000 young ethnic Macedonians learned to read and write using that language, and learned their own history.

The Provisional Democratic Government, founded in 1947, was in political and military control of 70% of the mainland (from Evros to Peloponnese) and partial control of the mountainous areas and most of the islands. During 1947 and until the spring of 1948, the National Army was mainly barricaded in Athens and other major Greek cities, and held the plains (Thessaly and Thessaloniki). DSE was then an army of nearly 40,000 fighters and benefited from a strong network of sympathizers in all rural villages – especially the mountainous areas. Its HQ was in Mount Vitsi, near the border with Yugoslavia. Two more Area HQs of DSE were stationed at Pindus and Peloponnese (Mount Taygetos).

Ethnic Macedonians fought in the Greek Civil War and made a significant contribution to the initial victories of the DSE. Their significance, however, rose as the conflict progressed due to their increased numbers within the DSE. However, when the Tito–Stalin split arose, Yugoslavia (and the Socialist Republic of Macedonia) closed its border to the DSE, as both the NOF and the DSE supported the Soviet line. At the end of the war, nearly 20,000 fighters have been either killed or captured by the National Army after the fighting in Peloponnese. Same situation was encountered in nearly all the islands, and in Thrace. By the beginning of 1949, in the last stage of the war, the Provisional Government was confined to the mountains of Pindos, Grammos, and Vitsi, and out of the DSE fighters more than 14,000 were ethnic Macedonians. Alexandros Zaouses in his research book Η Τραγική αναμέτρηση, 1945–1949 – Ο μύθος και η αλήθεια, states that out of the 22,000 DSE fighters, 14,000 were Slav-Macedonians. This number is confirmed by C. M. Woodhouse in his book "The Struggle for Greece, 1941–1949". Nevertheless, considerable debate continues to exist over the numbers, particularly as Woodhouse relied extensively on official Greek and British documents for his numbers. Αccording to ethnic Macedonian sources, at mid-1949 two-thirds of the DSE was composed of ethnic Macedonians. The DSE came under pressure after the British intervened, sending tanks, airplanes and ammunition to the government forces, which were mainly stationed in cities.

=== The defeat of the Democratic Army ===
The DSE, whose soldiers were armed mainly with light arms and had little heavy weaponry, started losing ground as a result of the heavy aerial bombardment, artillery barrages and tank attacks. In August 1948, Vafiadis was removed from the position of DSE commander-in-chief and was replaced by Nikos Zachariadis, who changed the whole command cadre to party members with no combat experience. This decision accelerated the decline of the DSE.

From the merger in 1946 until the end of the Civil War, the NOF was loyal to the idea of a unified Greece and was fighting for human rights for all groups within the borders of the Greek republic. But Zachariadis, in order to mobilize more ethnic Macedonians into the DSE, declared on 31 January 1949 at the 5th Meeting of the KKE Central Committee:

In Northern Greece the people of Macedonia gave its best for the struggle and fights on an integration of heroism and self-sacrifice that is admirable. There must be no doubt that as a result of the victory of DSE and of the peoples' revolution, the Macedonian people will find its full national restoration as they want it, offering its blood today to conquer it. The Macedonian communists are always in the front line of the struggle of their people. At the same time, the Macedonian Communists must be careful of disjunctive actions by foreign controlled chauvinists that want to dissolve the unity between the Macedonian and the Greek people. This actions will help only our common enemy, the monarch-fascism and English imperialism. At the same time, CPG must lift all the obstacles all the chauvinist actions that cause bad sentiments to the Macedonian people and therefore they help the chauvinists and in their actions of betrayal. The Greek and Macedonian people can win only united. If they are divided they can only be defeated. That's why unity of the two people must be kept as a precious element and must be strengthened constantly and at any time.

This new line of the KKE increased the mobilization rate of ethnic Macedonians (which even earlier was considerably high), but did not manage, ultimately, to change the course of the war. At the battles of Vitsi and Grammos, in which the government forces deployed napalm bombs and artillery barrages, the DSE was expelled from Greece. As Yugoslavia had closed its borders to Greece, the evacuation was conducted through Albania.

== Aftermath ==
=== Emigration of ethnic Macedonians from Greece ===
Whether as a result of force or of their own accord in order to escape repression and retaliation, some 50,000 civilians left Greece with the retreating DSE forces. All of them went to Eastern Bloc countries. It was not until the 1970s that some of them were allowed to return to the Socialist Republic of Macedonia. In the 1980s, the Greek parliament adopted a law of national reconciliation which allowed DSE members "of Greek origin" to repatriate to Greece, where they were given land. Ethnic Macedonian DSE members remained excluded from the terms of this legislation.

On August 20, 2003, the Rainbow Party hosted a reception for the "child refugees". Ethnic Macedonian children who fled their homes during the Greek Civil War were permitted to enter Greece for a maximum of 20 days. Now elderly, this was the first time many of them had seen their birthplaces and families in some 55 years. The reception included relatives of the refugees who were living in Greece and were members of Rainbow Party.

== See also ==
- Macedonian Question
- Mirka Ginova
- World War II in Yugoslav Macedonia
- Macedonian Anti-Fascist Organization
- Minorities in Greece

== Notes ==
1. "History of the Balkans, Vol. 2: Twentieth Century", Barbara Jelavich, 1983.
2. "Кон македонската преродба" Блаже Конески, Скопје, 1959. – The ethnic Macedonian renaissances started with Georgi Pulevski, going through the teachings of Misirkov to Dimitrija Čupovski.
3. "History of the Balkans, Vol. 2: Twentieth Century", Barbara Jelavich, 1983.
4. "The Situation in Macedonia and the Tasks of IMRO (United)" – published in the official newspaper of IMRO (United), "Македонско дело", N.185, April 1934
5. "Резолюция о македонской нации (принятой Балканском секретариате Коминтерна") – Февраль 1934 г, Москва
6. "Σαραντα χρονια του ΚΚΕ 1918–1958", Athens, 1958, p. 549.
7. "Rizospastis", no. 89 (7026), 10 June 1934, p. 3.
8. "Σαραντα χρονια του ΚΚΕ 1918–1958", Athens, 1958, p. 562.
9. "Les Archives de la Macedonine" – (Letter from Fotis Papadimitriou to the CC of the KKE), 28 March 1943.
10. "Народно Ослободителниот Фронт и други организации на Македонците од Егејскиот дел на Македонија. (Ристо Кирјазовски)", Skopje, 1985.
11. "Славјано Македонски Глас", 15 Јануари 1944 с.1
12. "АМ, Збирка: Егејска Македонија во НОБ 1941–1945 – (Повик на СНОФ до Македонците од Костурско 16 Мај 1944)"
13. "Идеолошкиот активизам над Македонците под Грција", Стојан Кочов, Скопје, 2000
14. "Народно Ослободителниот Фронт и други организации на Македонците од Егејскиот дел на Македонија. (Ристо Кирјазовски)", Скопје, 1985.
15. "Егеjски бури – Револуционерното движење во Воденско и НОФ во Егеjска Македоница. (Вангел Аjановски Оче)", Скопје, 1975.
16. "To ΚΚΕ, Episama kimena", t. V, 1940–1945, 1973.
17. "Les Archives de la Macedonine" – (The Constitution of NOF).
18. "Les Archives de la Macedonine, Fond: Aegean Macedonia in NLW" – (Field report of Mihail Keramidzhiev to the Main Command of NOF), 8 July 1945
19. "Les Archives de la Macedonine, Fond: Aegean Macedonia in NLW" – (Report of Elefterios Imsiridis to the CC of KKE about the activity of NOF), 6 September 1945
20. "Егејскиот дел на Македонија (1913–1989). Стојан Киселиновски", Скопје, 1990.
21. "КПГ и Македонското национално прашање (1918–1940). Ристо Кирјазовски", Скопје, 1985.
22. "Народно Ослободителниот Фронт и други организации на Македонците од Егејскиот дел на Македонија. (Ристо Кирјазовски)", Скопје, 1985.
23. "Η Τραγική αναμέτρηση, 1945–1949 – Ο μύθος και η αλήθεια. Ζαούσης Αλέξανδρος" (ISBN 9607213432).
24. "The Struggle for Greece, 1941–1949". C. M. Woodhouse, London, 1976. p. 262.
25. "Memoirs of the Gapkovski brothers – veteran fighters of the Greek Civil War"
26. "Incompatible Allies: Greek Communism and Macedonian Nationalism in the Civil War in Greece, 1943–1949. Andrew Rossos", The Journal of Modern History, Vol. 69, No. 1 (Mar., 1997)
27. "Prokiriksi, Praksis kai apofasis tou Genikou Arhigiou tou Dimokratikou Stratou tis Elados", 1947.
28. "Македонски национални институции во Егејскиот дел на Македонија (Ристо Кирјазовски)", Скопје, 1987.
29. "Σαραντα χρονια του ΚΚΕ 1918–1958", Αθηνα, 1958, σ.575.
30. "Македонците и односите на КПЈ и КПГ (1945–1949). Ристо Кирјазовски", Скопје, 1995.
31. "ΠΡΕΣΠΑ η Ελληνική", Δημήτρις Πένης. 1993. (p. 77)
32. "General Markos: Zašto me Staljin nije streljao. Jovan Popovski", Ljubljana, 1982.
33. "General Markos: Zašto me Staljin nije streljao. Jovan Popovski", Ljubljana, 1982.
34. "Resolution of the 5th Plenary Session of the Communist Party of Greece", 31 January 1949.
35. "Македонската политичка емиграција од Егејскиот дел на Македонија во Источна Европа. Ристо Кирјазовски", Скопје, 1989.
36. "From Gramos Mountain towards Lower Schleszia: Refugees from the Greek Civil War in Eastern Europe and Central Asia", Stefan Troebst.
37. "Greek Helsinki Monitor (GHM) – Minority rights Report on Greece to the 1998 OSCE Implementation Meeting", 28 October 1998.
