= Church of Saint Nedela =

Macedonian Orthodox church in North Macedonia

Coordinates: 41°02′26″N 21°20′55″E

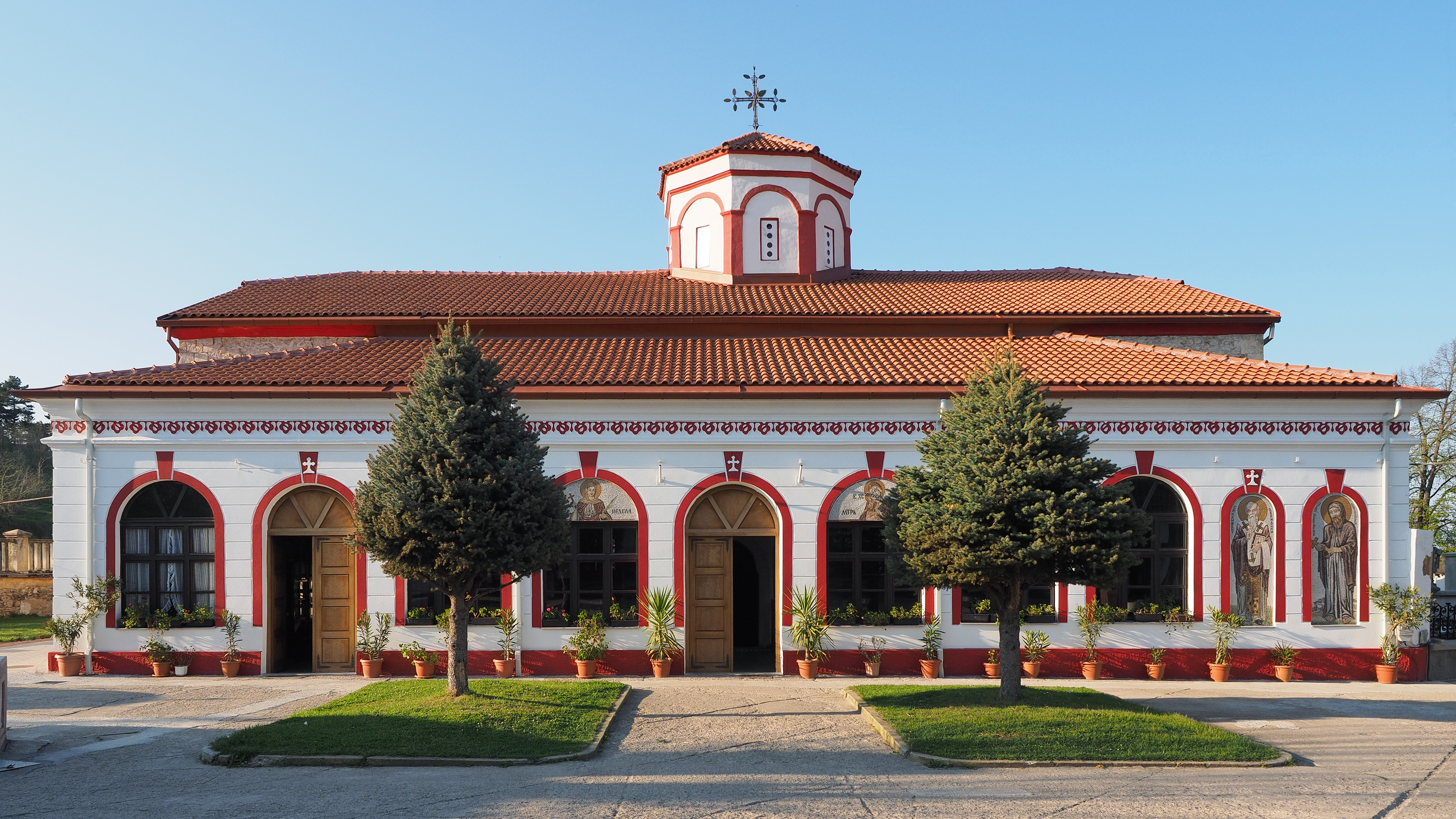
The Church of Saint Nedela

Fair in front of the Church of "St. Nedela" in Bitola, by the Manaki brothers

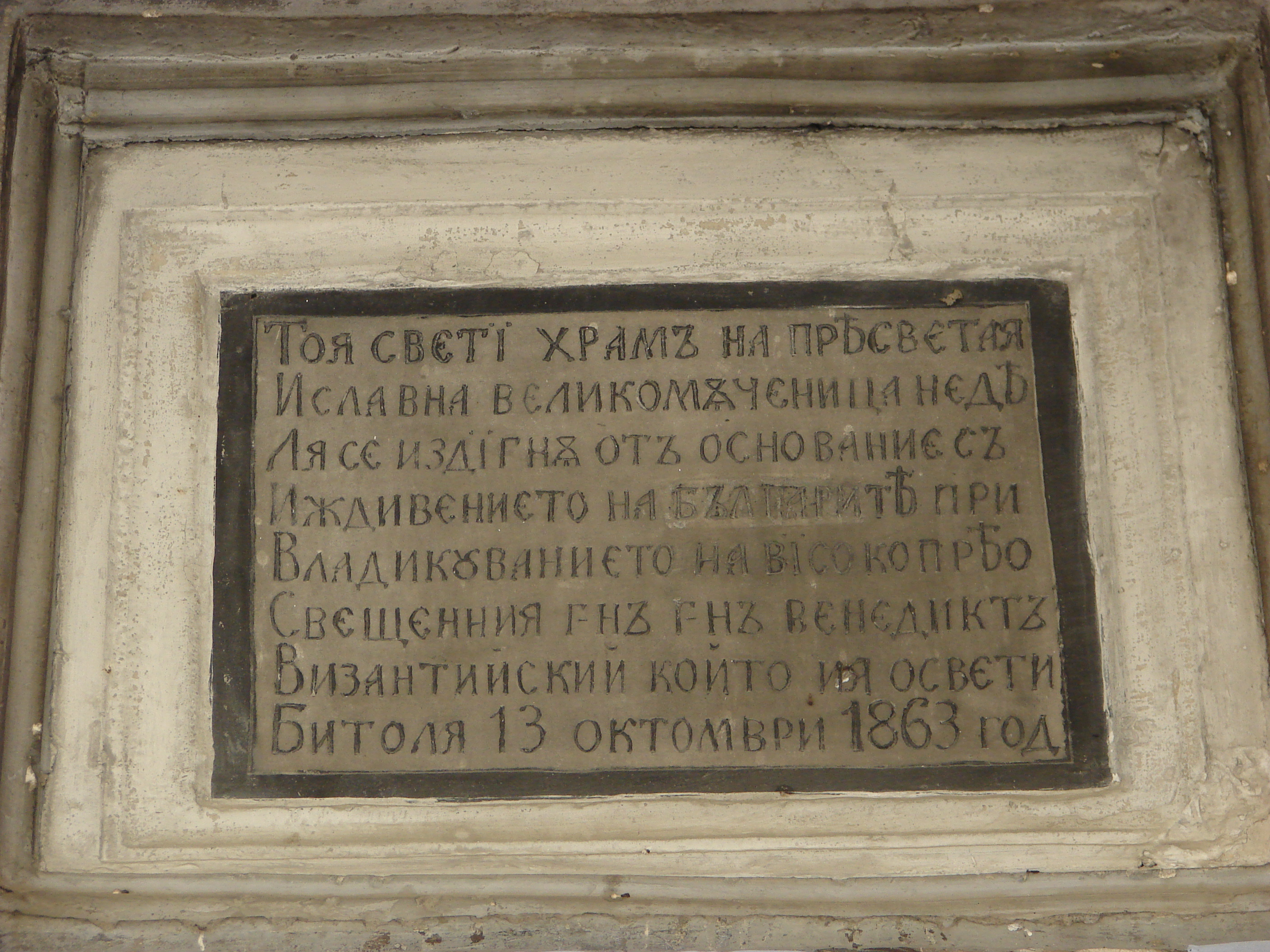
Commemorative plaque about the foundation of the church. It reads: This holy church was erected with the contribution of the Bulgarians in Bitola on October 13, 1863.

The Church of Saint Nedela (Macedonian: Црква „Св. Недела“, romanized: Crkva „Sv. Nedela“) is a Macedonian Orthodox church in Bitola, North Macedonia. It was completed in October 1863. The icons of the Apostles in the church were done by the artist Solomon Nikolov.

The church is the setting of the film Fair in front of the Church of St. Nedela in Bitola, filmed by the pioneering Manaki brothers from 1905 to 1912.

== Cemetery ==
The grounds of the Church of Saint Nedela contain a cemetery. Seven Bulgarian soldiers were buried here following World War I.

=== Notable burials ===
- Mihail Dimev
- Kiril Lozančev
- Dimko Nikolov
- Jon Pašata
- Dimche Sarvanov
- Aleksandar Turundzhev
