= Andon Kalchev =

Bulgarian army officer (1910–1948)

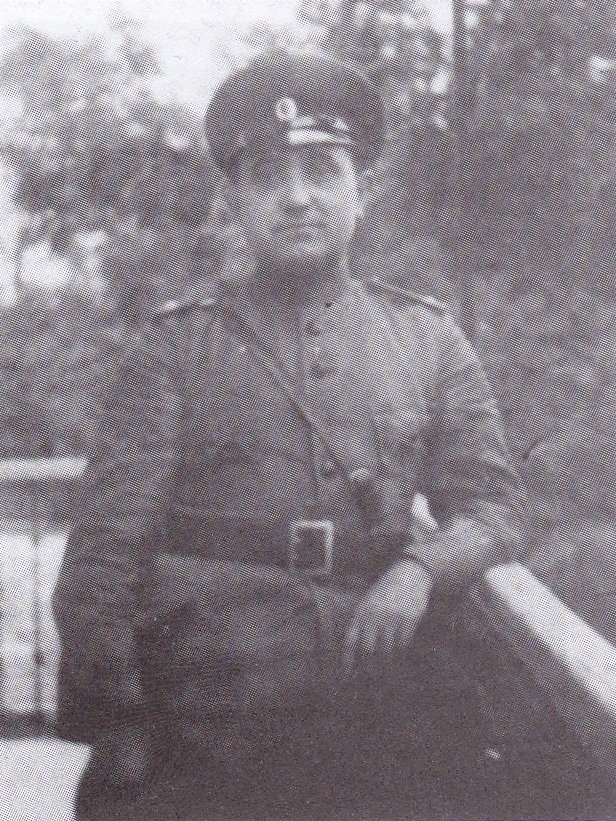
- Andon Kalchev in Aegean Macedonia, 1941
- Native name: Андон Калчев
- Born: 1910; Zhuzheltsi, Kastoria, Ottoman Empire
- Died: 27 August 1948 (aged 37–38) Thessaloniki, Greece
- Allegiance: Kingdom of Bulgaria
- Education: Leipzig University

Andon Kalchev (Bulgarian: Андон Калчев) (1910 – 27 August 1948) was a Bulgarian army officer, one of the leaders of the Bulgarian-backed Ohrana, a paramilitary formation of Bulgarians in Greek Macedonia during World War II Axis occupation. He was active outside the Bulgarian occupied area of Macedonia, under the tolerance of the Italian and German authorities which used him in their fights with rival Greek EAM-ELAS and Yugoslav Communist resistance groups. Because of his collaborationist activity, he was sentenced to death by Greek military tribunal, and was executed by firing squad on 27 August 1948.

== Early life ==
He was born in Zhuzheltsi, Ottoman Empire, today Spilia, Kastoria regional unit in Greece in 1910. After the Balkan Wars in 1913, Greece took control of southern Macedonia and began an official policy of forced assimilation which included the settlement of Greeks from other provinces into southern Macedonia, as well as the linguistic and cultural Hellenization of the ethnic Bulgarians. The Greeks expelled Bulgarian Exarchist churchmen and teachers and closed Bulgarian schools and churches. Bulgarian language (including the Macedonian dialects) was prohibited, and its surreptitious use, whenever detected, was ridiculed or punished.

Within Greece, the Macedonian Bulgarians were designated "Slavophone Greeks". After the Balkan Wars and especially after the First World War up to 190,000 Bulgarians from Aegean Macedonia and Western Thrace fled to Bulgaria as refugees. At this time the Internal Macedonian Revolutionary Organization (IMRO) began sending armed combat groups (cheti) into Greek Macedonia and Thrace to assassinate officials and stir up the spirit of the oppressed population. Kalchev came from a well known IMRO Bulgarian local family, which emigrated from Greek Macedonia to Balchik, Bulgaria after the Second Balkan War. Kalchev graduated at a gymnasium in Sofia and then at the Leipzig University. Later he went back to Bulgaria, where he graduated from a military officer's school in Sofia.

== Participation by the Bulgarian occupation of Greece ==
The 4th of August Regime in Greece (1936 to 1941) under the leadership of General Ioannis Metaxas was firmly opposed to the pro-Bulgarian factions of the Slavophones of northern Greece, some of whom underwent political persecution due to advocacy of irredentism with regard to neighboring countries. Metaxas' regime continued repression of the use of Slavic languages both in public and in private as well as expressions of Slavic cultural distinctiveness. As a consequence after the German invasion in Greece (6 April 1941) followed also a Bulgarian annexation of Eastern Macedonia and part of Western Thrace.

Bulgaria joined World War II siding with the Axis in an attempt to solve its own "national question" and fulfill the aim of "Greater Bulgaria", especially in the area of Macedonia (where much territory was lost in the Second Balkan War) and Western Thrace (former Bulgarian state international recognized territory lost to Greece in the Treaty of Neuilly). Bulgaria joined the Axis on 1 March 1941, explicitly requesting German support for its territorial claims.

A massive campaign of "Bulgarisation" was launched, which saw all Greek officials deported. A ban was placed on the use of the Greek language, the names of towns and places changed to the forms traditional in Bulgarian. In addition, the Bulgarian government tried to alter the ethnic composition of the region, by expropriating land and houses from Greeks in favour of Bulgarian settlers (former refugees from Macedonia and others), and by the introduction of forced labour and of economic restrictions for the Greeks in an effort to force them to migrate. A spontaneous and badly organized uprising around Drama, Greece in late September 1941 was violently crushed by the Bulgarian Army. By late 1941, more than 100,000 Greeks had been expelled from the Bulgarian occupation zone.

When the Bulgarians occupied eastern Macedonia in 1941 they began also a campaign to win the loyalty of the Bulgarians of Greek Macedonia and to reinforce their Bulgarian ethnic sentiments. While some of these people did greet the Bulgarians as liberators particularly in eastern and central Macedonia (which was under Bulgarian occupation), this campaign was less successful in German-occupied western Macedonia.

Kalchev served as officer first into Bulgarian annexed territories, but later was sent into the German occupied Thessaloniki to found there a Bulgarian military club, when the German High Command approved it in 1941. The Bulgarians soon organized supplying of food and provisions for the Bulgarian population in Central and Western Macedonia in an attempt to gain support. Many Bulgarian political prisoners were released with the intercession of Bulgarian Club in Thessaloniki, which had made representations to the German occupation authorities.

== Founding of Ohrana and collaboration with the Italian and the German occupation forces ==
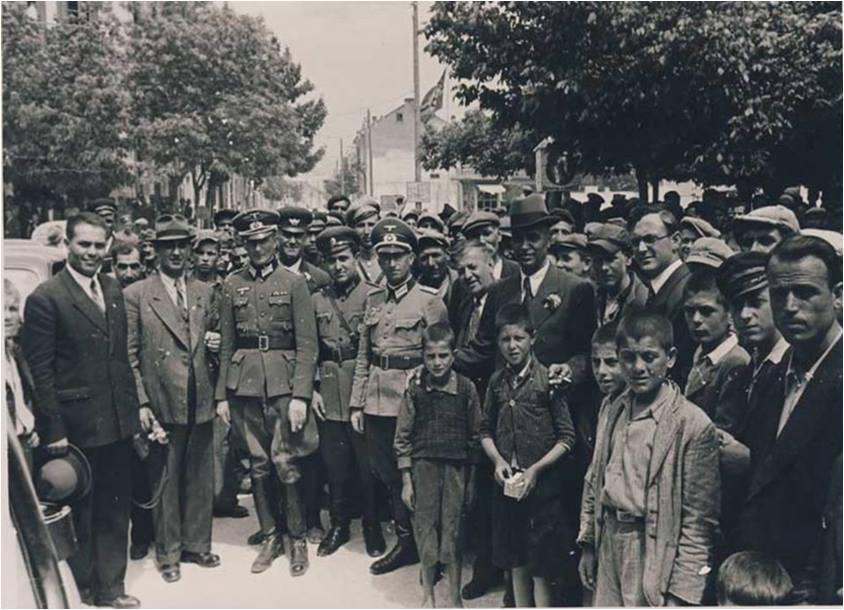
Slavophones welcoming Andon Kalchev and German soldiers in Florina, 1942. During the German and Italian occupation of Western Macedonia, most of the local Slavophone population welcomed the Bulgarian administrators as liberators, as anti-Greek and pro-Bulgarian feelings among the local Slavophone population prevailed at that time.

In 1942, the Bulgarian club asked assistance from the German High command in organizing armed units among the Bulgarian population in northern Greece. For this purpose, the Bulgarian army, under the approval of the German forces in the Balkans sent a handful of officers to the zones occupied by the Italian and German troops to be attached to the occupying forces as "liaison officers". One of them was Kalchev. These officers were given the objective to form armed Bulgarian militias. Bulgaria was interested in acquiring the zones under Italian and German occupation and hoped to sway the allegiance of the 80,000 Bulgarophones who lived there at the time.

In the first half of March 1943, Bulgarian military and police carried out the deportation of the majority of non-Bulgarian Jews, 13,341 in total, from the occupied territories, beyond the borders of Bulgaria before the war, and handed them over into German custody. On the eve of the planned deportations, the Bulgarian government made inquiries regarding the destination of the deportees and asked to be reimbursed for the costs of deportation. German representatives indicated that the deportees would be used as labor in agricultural and military projects. As recorded in the German Archives, Nazi Germany paid 7,144.317 leva for the deportation of 3,545 adults and 592 children destined for the Treblinka extermination camp. 4,500 Jews from Greek Thrace and Eastern Macedonia were deported to Poland, and 7,144 from Vardar Macedonia and Pomoravlje were sent to Treblinka. None survived. On March 20, 1943, Bulgarian military police, assisted by German soldiers, took Jews from Komotini and Kavala off the passenger steamship Karageorge, massacred them, and sank the vessel.

The appearance of Greek partisans in those areas persuaded the Italians to allow the formation of these detachments. The Bulgarian plan was to organize them militarily in the hope that Bulgaria would eventually assume the administration there. The appearance of Greek partisans in Western Macedonia persuaded the Italian and German authorities to allow the formation of Slav security battalions led by Bulgarian officers. The initial detachments were formed in early 1943 in the district of Kastoria by Andon Kalchev with the support of the head of the Italian occupation authorities in Kastoria lieutenant Ravalli, who armed the local villages to help combat the growing resistance activity by the ELAS.

The name given to the armed militias was Ohrana (Bulgarian: Охрана - "Protection" in Bulgarian). The reasons of locals for taking arms varied. Some of the men were pre-war members of IMRO, and thus harbored deep Bulgarian convictions, some to assist in self-defense of Greek attacks, others due to pro-Nazi sentiments, some to avenge repressions inflicted on them by Greek authorities during the Metaxas dictatorship, and many others to defend themselves from attacks by other Greek resistance movements, which saw them as collaborationists with the Italian, Bulgarian and German forces. In the summer of 1944, Ohrana constituted some 12,000 local fighters and volunteers from Bulgaria charged with protection of the local population.

During 1944, whole called by the Greeks Bulgarophone (now Slavophone) villages were armed by the occupation authorities to counterbalance the emerging power of the resistance and especially of Greek People's Liberation Army (ELAS). On 5 April 1944, rebel group EAM-ELAS attacked a German convoy of lorries killing 25 soldiers. The Germans later in the afternoon, arrived gathered men, women, children and elders of the village and executed between 233 and 300 people.

After the war, Kalchev was accused of having participated in atrocities in the town of Kleisoura known as the Massacre of Kleisoura with Bulgarian men of the German militia.

== Dissolution of Ohrana and extraordinary military court death sentence ==
However the advance of the Red Army into Bulgaria in 1944, the withdrawal of the German armed forces from Greece in October, meant that the Bulgarian Army had to withdraw from Greek Macedonia and Thrace, leaving Greece with the difficult task of post-occupation reconstruction. Kalchev's active collaboration with the Italian and German Army in fighting the resistance forces and the using of local conscripted manpower born a very unpleasant situation for this pro-Bulgarian Slavophone part of the population after the end of the war, leading to a new wave of emigration to Bulgaria and Yugoslavia, the last (since World War I) members of the Bulgarian minority of Greece. After the Bulgarians and Germans withdrew, he hid in his village until April 1945.

Kalchev was taken POW by the Yugoslav partisans and imprisoned in Bitola. Later they sent him to the Greeks. Bulgaria's Communist Prime Minister Traycho Kostov twice sent official demands for the repatriation of Kalchev, but to no avail. The Greeks prosecuted him for collaboration and sentenced him twice in 1946 to life in prison/penal servitude, and, despite being once again sentenced again in 1948, to death. He was executed on 27 August 1948 at Thessaloniki Yedi Kule prison. During the public process organized he states "Overthere, where I was born, since centuries are living only Bulgarians". His last words in front of a firing squad were: "Hurray Macedonia!"

== See also ==
- Collaboration with the Axis Powers
- Macedonian Question
- Slavic-speakers of Greek Macedonia
- Axis occupation of Greece during World War II
- Military history of Greece during World War II
- Military history of Bulgaria during World War II
