= Monastery of St. George and St. Cyril and Methodius =

Place of worship in Macedonia

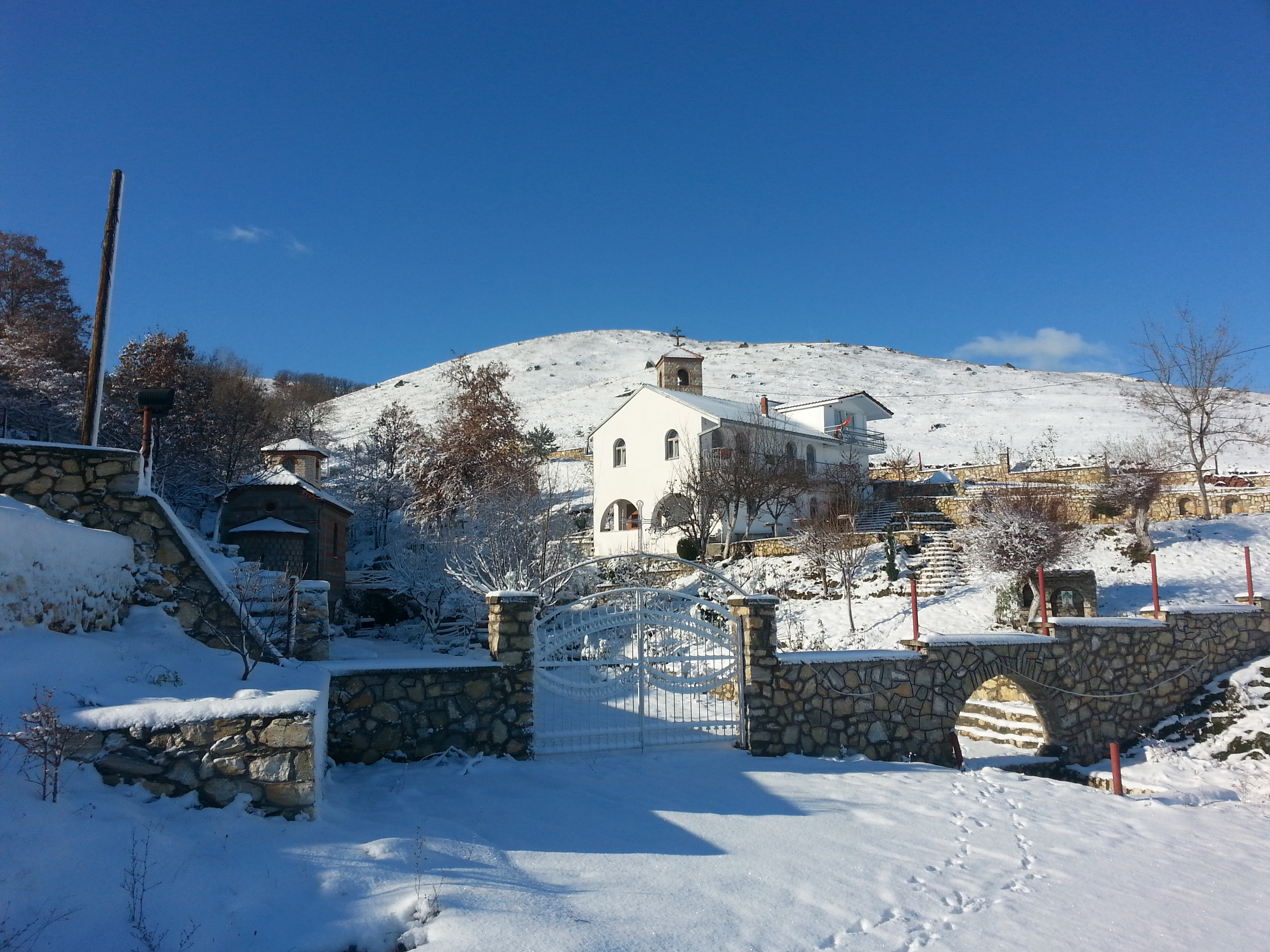

The Monastery of Saints Cyril and Methodius and St. George is a Macedonian Orthodox monastery and church in Loznani, North Macedonia. It is located on the slopes of Mount Selačka at an elevation of 637 metres.

The church has one tower in the middle and a 3-D golden crucifix which can be seen at all angles. In the church tower, a massive icon of Jesus Christ overlooks the church. Depictions of the Virgin Mary, Christ and many saints are displayed on the walls.

The monastery was built in 1990 by Bisera Dimitrovska, a local resident. Dimitrovska claimed that he was awakened one night by the Virgin Mary. She told him to build a monastery next to the site of the old church of Saint Cyril and Methodius by an ancient spring .

The monastery attracts worshippers from all over the Balkans. They pray in the church and drink the spring water flowing from a tap inside the building. The monastery holds festivals, church services and other religious ceremonies.
