= Vangel Ajanovski-Oče =

Macedonian politician (1909–1996)

Vangel Ajanovski-Oče Вангел Ајановски-Оче
- Born: 5 February 1909; Voden, Salonica Vilayet, Ottoman Empire (now Edessa, Greece)
- Died: c. 1996 (aged 86-87); Skopje, Former Yugoslav Republic of Macedonia
- Children: Risto Ajanovski - Taki; Georgi Ajanovski
- Military career
- Allegiance: Yugoslavia: Socialist Republic of Macedonia
- Branch: National Liberation Front
- Service years: 1943-1949
- Conflicts: Greek Civil War
- Other work: Leader of the Macedonia Antifascist Organization; Leader of the Secret Macedonian Organization for Liberation

Vangel Ajanovski-Oče (Macedonian: Вангел Ајановски-Оче) (1909–1996) was the initiator and communist leader of Macedonian national organizations such as the Macedonian Anti-Fascist Organization (Macedonian: Македонска антифашистичка организација, Makedonska antifašistička organizacija, MAO) and the Secret Macedonian Organization for Liberation (Macedonian: Тајна ослободителна македонска организација, Tajna osloboditelna makedonska organizacija, TOMO). He then became the secretary of the Voden (Edessa) regional committee of the People's Liberation Front (NOF), a communist political and military organization created by the Slavic Macedonian minority in Greece. He was an organizational secretary of the central council of NOF for sections of the Slavic Macedonian minority in northwestern Greece. He died aged 87 in 1996. His sons are Risto Ajanovski - Taki, Georgi Ajanovski.
