= Mogila, North Macedonia =

Village in Pelagonia, North Macedonia

Mogila, North Macedonia Могила
- Village
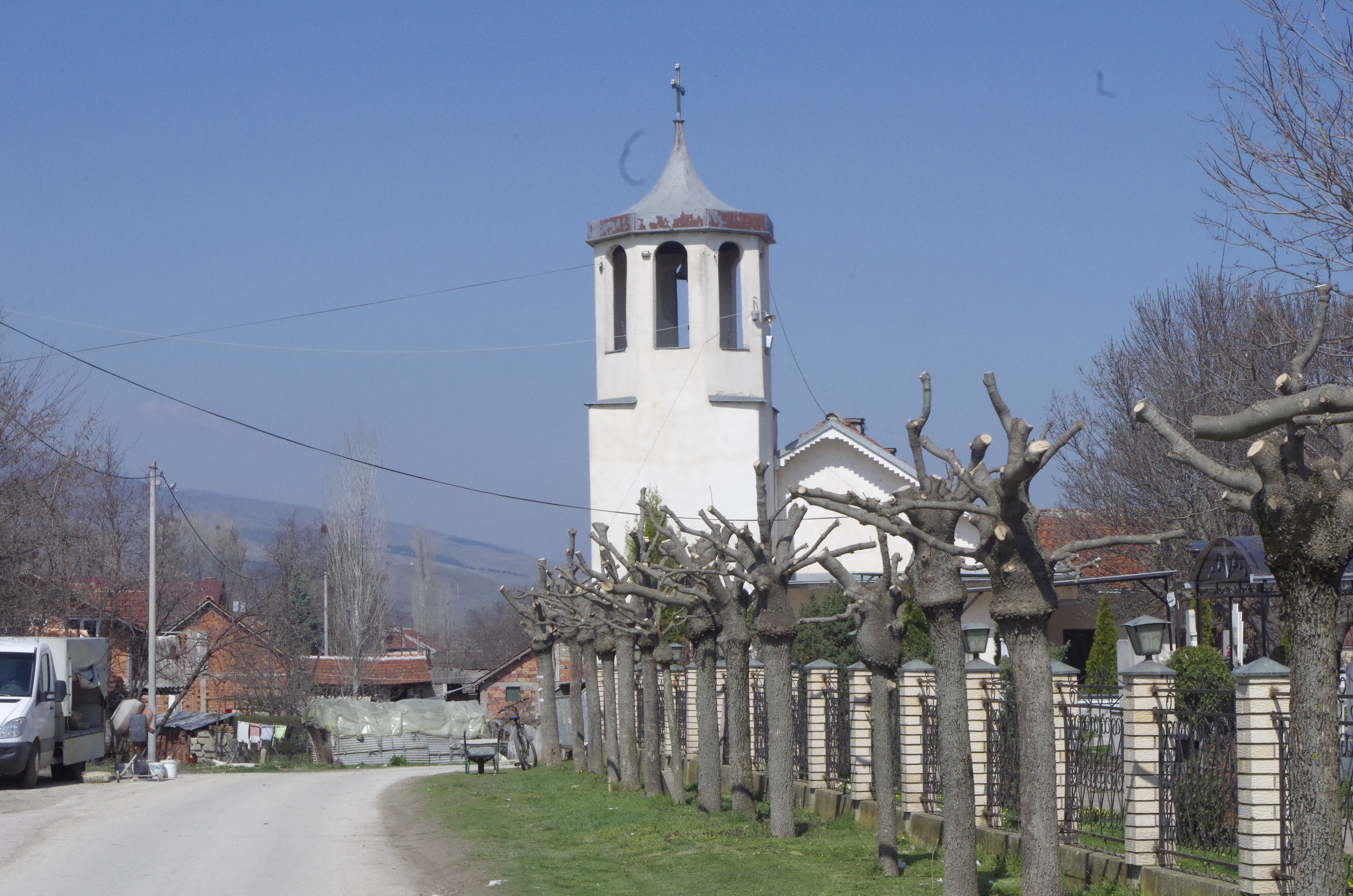
- Bell tower of the church "St. Michael the Archangel" in Mogila

- Location within North Macedonia
- Coordinates: 41°6′29″N 21°22′42″E
- Country: North Macedonia
- Region: Pelagonia
- Municipality: Mogila

Government
  - Mayor: Dragančo Sabotkovski (VMRO-DPMNE)

Area
  - Total: 22.2 km^{2} (8.6 sq mi)
- Elevation: 582 m (1,909 ft)

Population (2021)
  - Total: 1,262
  - Density: 56.8/km^{2} (147/sq mi)
- Time zone: UTC+1 (CET)
  - Summer (DST): UTC+2 (CEST)
- Vehicle registration: BT

Mogila (Macedonian: Могила) is a village in Pelagonia, North Macedonia, serving as the seat of the Mogila Municipality. In 2021, the village had a population of 1,262.

== History ==
Vasil Kanchov's 1900 survey recorded 850 Bulgarian Christians in the village. Later in 1905, Secretary of the Bulgarian Exarchate Dimitar Mishev (writing as "Brancoff") documented 736 Exarchist Bulgarians in Moghila, with one primary school, one teacher, and 21 students.

In the late 19th century and early 20th century the village became involved in the struggle of the Internal Macedonian Revolutionary Organization against Ottoman rule. On May 8, 1903, the home of local revolutionary Nikola Meshkov, a member of Parashkev Tsvetkov's band, was raided by Ottoman forces, and in the ensuing battle three men and two women were killed.

== Geography ==
The village is situated in the central part of the Bitola Field at an elevation of 582 meters above sea level. It has a relatively large land area of 22.2 square kilometers and is adjacent to the Bitola-Prilep road.

== Demographics ==
=== Ethnic groups ===
The historical ethnic makeup of this village is as follows: (Note: In 1948, the population was 1,480, with no recorded ethnic composition.)

| Ethnicity | Year | | | | | | | |
| Ethnicity | 1953 | 1961 | 1971 | 1981 | 1991 | 1994 | 2002 | 2021 |
|---|---|---|---|---|---|---|---|---|
| Macedonians | 1,695 | 2,033 | 2,263 | 2,495 | 2,280 | 1,576 | 1,525 | 1,228 |
| Albanians | 0 | 0 | 0 | 2 | 0 | 0 | 0 | 1 |
| Turks | 0 | 0 | 0 | 0 | 0 | 0 | 0 | 0 |
| Roma | 0 | 0 | 0 | 0 | 0 | 0 | 0 | 0 |
| Aromanians | 0 | 0 | — | 0 | 0 | 0 | 0 | 0 |
| Serbs | 7 | 5 | 1 | 0 | 0 | 0 | 0 | 0 |
| Bosniaks | 0 | 0 | — | — | — | 0 | 0 | 0 |
| Others | 1 | 0 | 18 | 13 | 5 | 0 | 1 | 0 |
| Total | 1,703 | 2,038 | 2,282 | 2,510 | 2,285 | 1,576 | 1,526 | 1,262 (Note: There are one "not mentioned" and 32 "persons for whom the data has been obtained from administrative sources".) |

=== Sex distribution ===
The historical population of both sexes in this village is as follows:

| Sex | | Year | | | | | | |
| Sex | 1948 | 1953 | 1961 | 1971 | 1981 | 1991 | 1994 | 2002 |
|---|---|---|---|---|---|---|---|---|
| Male | 777 | 874 | 1,046 | 1,180 | 1,333 | 1,196 | 828 | 800 |
| Female | 703 | 829 | 992 | 1,102 | 1,177 | 1,089 | 748 | 726 |

== Sports ==
Local football club FK Mogila last played in the Macedonian Third League.

== Notable people ==
=== Born in Mogila ===
- Dimche Sarvanov, IMRO revolutionary

=== Died in Mogila ===
- Parashkev Tsvetkov, IMRO revolutionary
