= Macedonian Anti-Fascist Organization =

Macedonian political organization

The Macedonian Anti-Fascist Organization was a Macedonian political organization formed in 1941 in the Voden region at the initiative of the Communist Party of Greece. The organization was headed by Vangel Ajanovski-Oče, Angel Gacev, Risto Kordalov, Dini Papayankov and others. The aim of the organization was, in alliance with the Greek EAM-ELAS, to fight the fascist forces. It was dissolved in 1943.
