= Crničani, Dojran =

Crničani Црничани
- Village
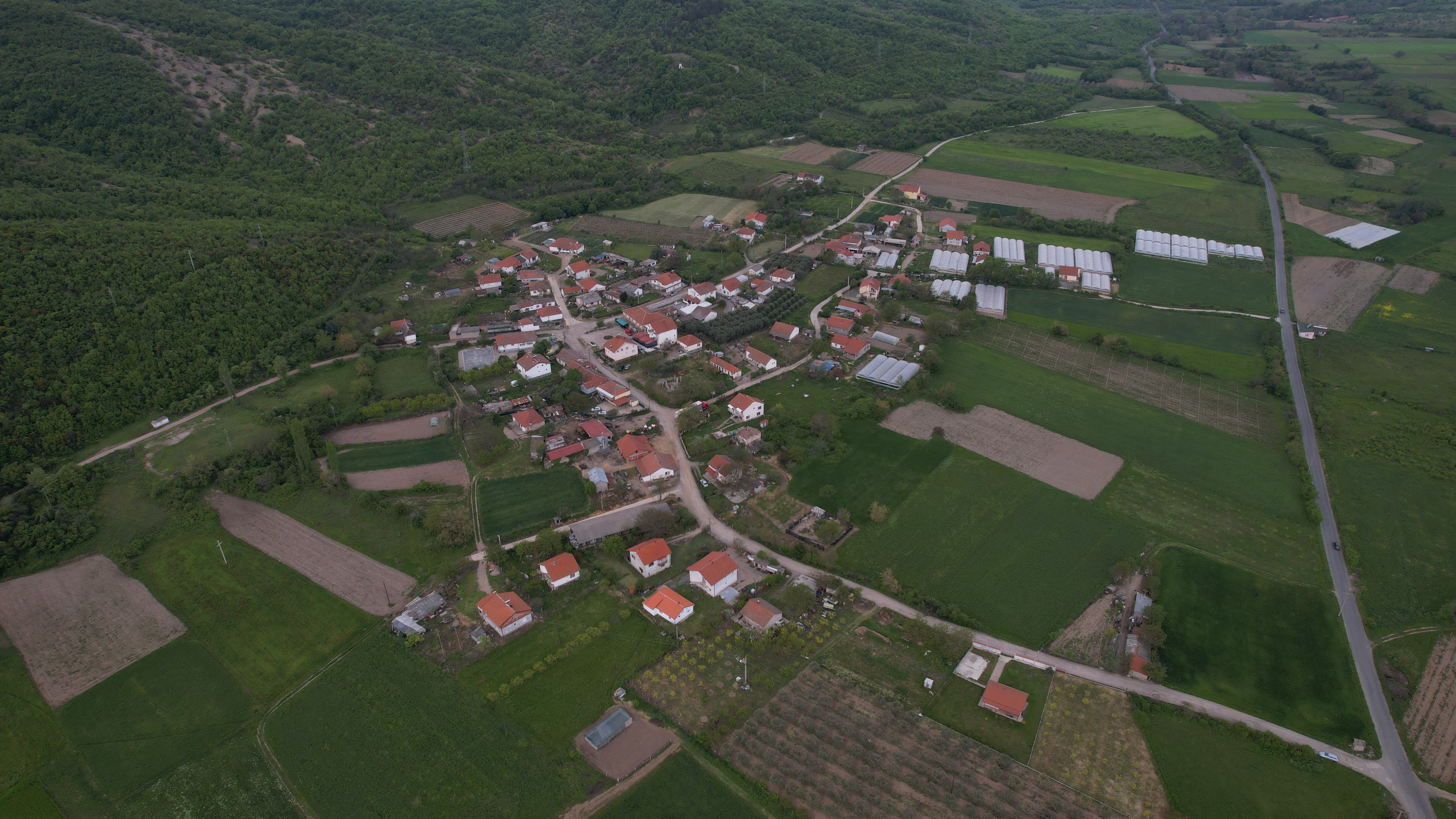
- Air view of the village

- Location within North Macedonia
- Coordinates: 41.235611°N 22.654484°E
- Country: North Macedonia
- Region: Southeastern
- Municipality: Dojran

Population (2021)
  - Total: 189
- Time zone: UTC+1 (CET)
  - Summer (DST): UTC+2 (CEST)
- Website: .

Crničani (Macedonian: Црничани) is a village in the municipality of Dojran, North Macedonia.

== Demographics ==
According to the 2002 census, the village had a total of 221 inhabitants. Ethnic groups in the village include:

- Macedonians 189
- Serbs 29
- Others 3

As of 2021, the village of Crnichani has 189 inhabitants and the ethnic composition was the following:

- Macedonians – 116
- Serbs – 69
- others – 2
- Person without Data - 2
