= Ohrana =

Bulgarian collaborationist units in Greek Macedonia during WWII

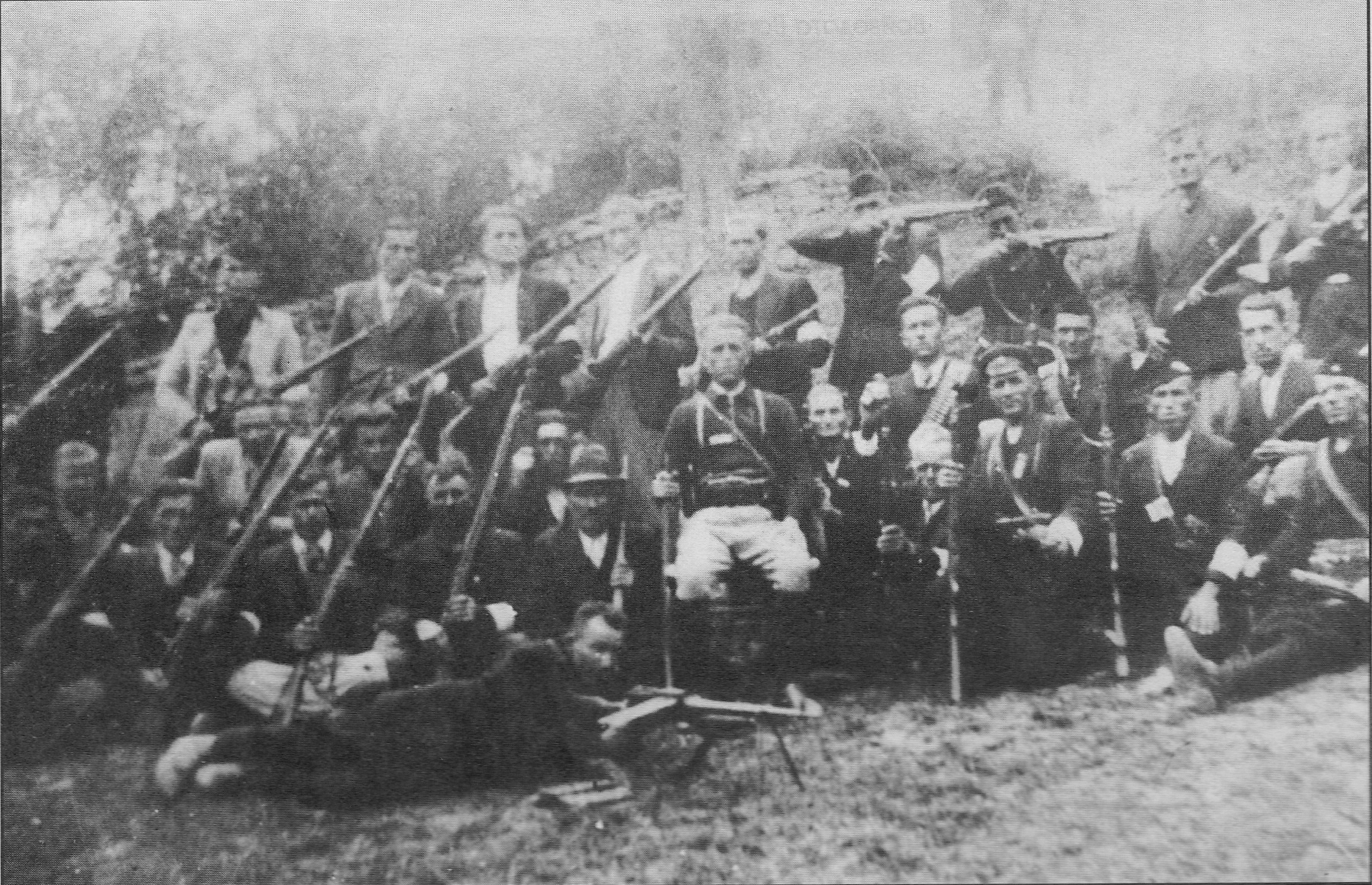
Detachment of Ohrana in Lakkomata, Kastoria, Orestida in 1943.

Ohrana (Bulgarian: Охрана, "Protection"; Greek: Οχράνα) were armed collaborationist detachments organized by the former Internal Macedonian Revolutionary Organization (IMRO) structures, composed of Bulgarians in Nazi-occupied Greek Macedonia during World War II and led by officers of the Bulgarian Army. Bulgaria was interested in acquiring Thessalonica and Western Macedonia, under Italian and German occupation and hoped to sway the allegiance of the 80,000 Slavs who lived there at the time. The appearance of Greek partisans in those areas persuaded the Axis to allow the formation of these collaborationist detachments. However, during late 1944, when the Axis appeared to be losing the war, many Bulgarian Nazi collaborators, Ohrana members and VMRO regiment volunteers fled to the opposite camp by joining the newly founded communist SNOF. The organization managed to recruit initially 1,000 up to 3,000 armed men from the Slavophone community that lived in the western part of Greek Macedonia.

== Background ==
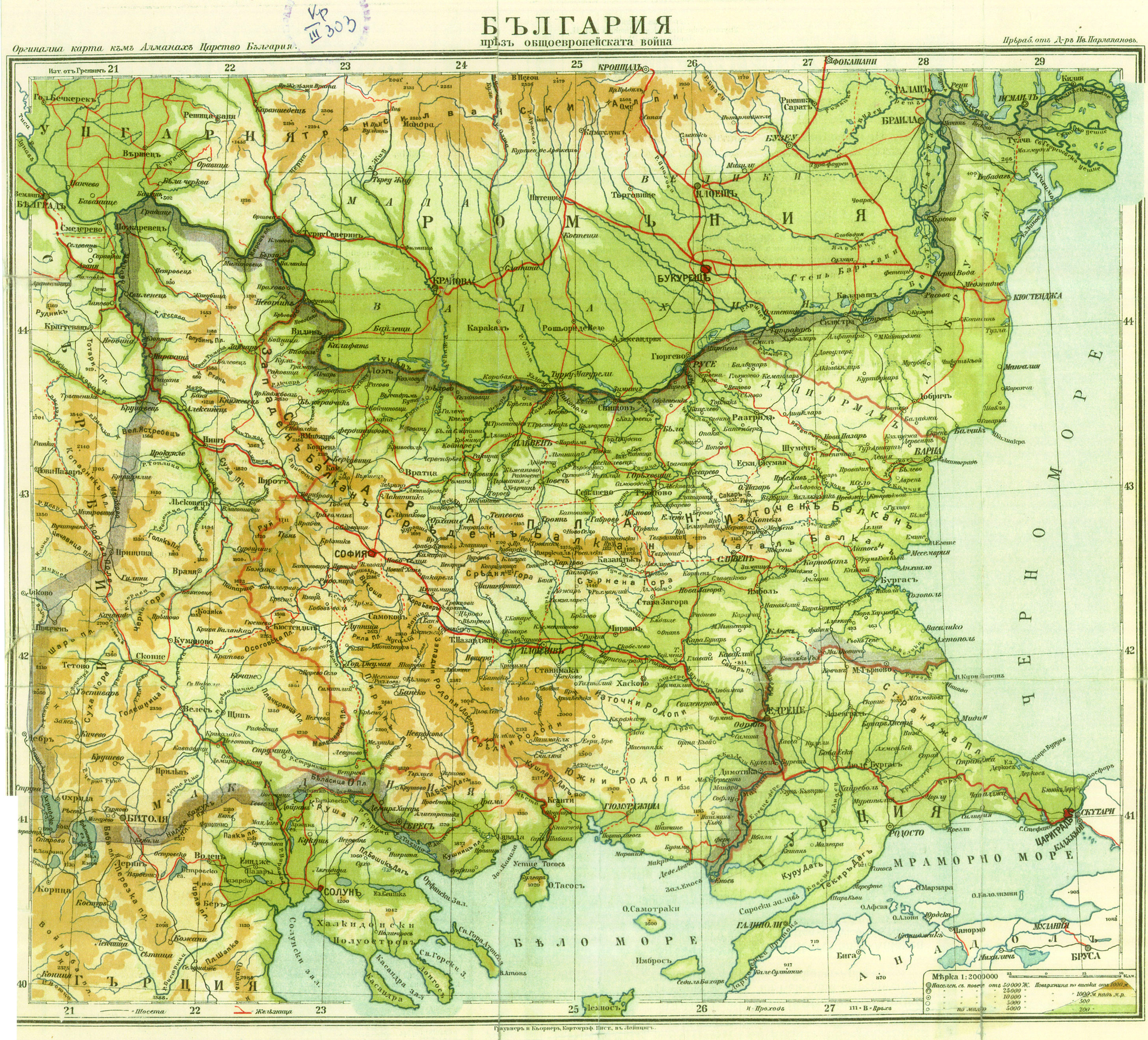
Bulgarian campaigns during World War I, borders in grey

The "Macedonian Question," became especially prominent after the Balkan Wars in 1912–1913, following the defeat of the Ottoman Empire and the subsequent division of the Region of Macedonia between Greece, Bulgaria and Serbia.

Bulgarian communities inhabited parts of southern Macedonia from the Middle Ages. This continued also during 16th and 17th centuries, as recorded by Ottoman historians and travellers like Hoca Sadeddin Efendi, Mustafa Selaniki, Hadji Khalfa and Evliya Çelebi. The majority of Slavic-speakers after 1870 were under the influence of the Bulgarian Exarchate and its education system, and thus considered themselves to be Bulgarians. Part of them were influenced by the Greek Patriarchate, which resulted in the formation of Greek consciousness. Greece, like all other Balkan states, adopted restrictive policies towards its minorities, namely towards its Slavic population in its northern regions, as a result of the aftermath of Second Balkan War and the potential threat that Bulgaria could pose in the fear of using the pro-Bulgarian oriented minority in Greece as a subversive fifth column. After the Balkan Wars and especially after the First World War more than 100,000 Bulgarians from Greek Macedonia moved to Bulgaria, as part of the population exchange policy between the two countries.

During the 1930s a new identity parallel to the Greek and Bulgarian ones began to arose in the region of Macedonia, the Slav Macedonian (Greek: Σλαβομακεδόνας) and was initially supported by IMRO (United). In 1934 the Comintern issued a declaration supporting the development of the new Macedonian identity, which was admitted by the Greek Communist Party. During the 1930s under the Metaxas Regime, the government endorsed violence by nationalist bands, which sowed the seeds of bitterness that kept brewing within the local Slavic-speaking population which found the opportunity to come into effect during the Second World War and the occupation of Greece by the Axis forces.

== Bulgarian occupation and policy in Greece ==
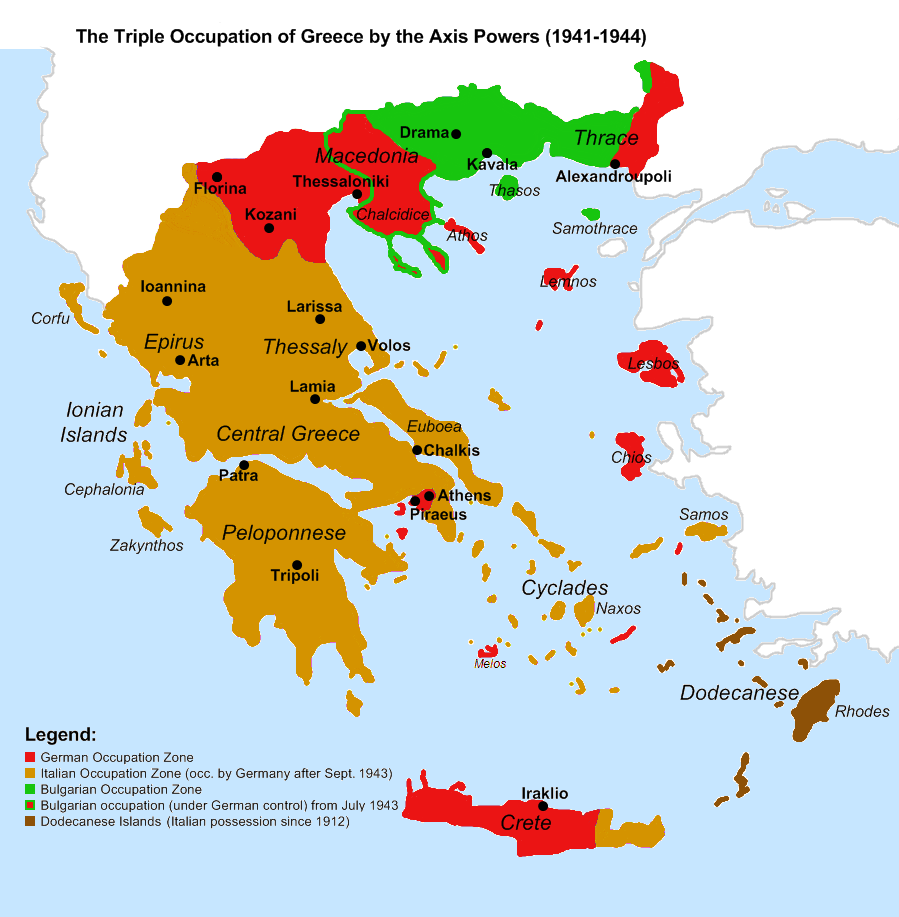
Triple Occupation of Greece.

In 1941 Greek Macedonia was occupied by German, Italian and Bulgarian troops. The Bulgarians occupied the Eastern Macedonia and Western Thrace, an area of 14,430 square kilometers, with 590,000 inhabitants. The Bulgarian policy was to win the loyalty of the Slav inhabitants and to instill them a Bulgarian national identity. Indeed, some of these people did greet the Bulgarians as liberators, particularly in eastern and central Macedonia, yet the campaign was less successful in German-occupied western Macedonia. At that time most of them felt themselves to be Bulgarians, irrespective of ideological affiliation. However, in contrast with the population of Vardar Macedonia, smaller fraction of the Slav population collaborated in the Greek part of Macedonia, whether in the Bulgarian-occupied eastern section or the German and Italian-occupied zones. Nevertheless, Bulgarian expansionism was better received in some frontier districts, where strong pro-Bulgarian oriented Slav-speakers lived (in Kastoria, Florina and Pella districts).

== Thessaloniki Bulgarian club ==
During the same year, the German High Command approved the foundation of a Bulgarian military club in Thessaloníki. The Bulgarians organised supplies of food and provisions for the Slavic-speaking population in Greek Macedonia, aiming to gain the hearts and minds of the local population that was in the German- and Italian-occupied zones. The Bulgarian clubs soon started to gain support among parts of the population. In 1942, the Bulgarian club asked assistance from the High Command in organising armed units among the Slavic-speaking population in northern Greece. For this purpose, the Bulgarian army, under the approval of the Commander of the German forces in the Balkans - Field Marshal List sent a handful of officers from the Bulgarian Army, to the zones occupied by the Italian and German troops (central and west Greek Macedonia) to be attached to the German occupying forces as "liaison officers". All the Bulgarian officers brought into service were locally born Macedonians who had immigrated to Bulgaria with their families during the 1920s and 30s as part of the Greek-Bulgarian treaty of the Neuilly which saw 90,000 Bulgarians migrating to Bulgaria from Greece and 50,000 Greeks moving the opposite direction. Most were members of pro-Bulgarian IMRO and followers of Ivan Mihailov.These officers were given the objective to form armed Slavophone militias.

== Kastorian Italo-Bulgarian Committee ==
The initial detachments were formed in 1943 in the district of Kastoria by Bulgarian army officer Andon Kalchev with the support of the head of the Italian occupation authorities in Kastoria, colonel Venieri, who armed the local villages to help combat the growing communist threat presented by the ELAS raiding the Italian occupation forces in the district. The name given to the bands armed was 'Ohrana' which in Bulgarian is defined as 'security'. The uniforms of the Ohranists were supplied by the Italians and were resplendent with shoulder patches bearing the inscription "Italo-Bulgarian Committee — Freedom or Death". The Kastorian unit was called the Macedonian Committee. The reasons of locals for taking arms varied. Some of the men were pre-war members of IMRO, and thus harbored deep nationalistic convictions, others because of pro-Nazi sentiments, some to avenge wrongdoings inflicted on them by Greek authorities during the Metaxas regime, and many took arms in order to defend themselves from the attacks of other Greek paramilitary and resistance movements as the latter saw them as collaborators with the Italian, Bulgarian and German forces.

Bulgarian collaborationist bands participated in reprisal missions together with the Nazi troops in the region. In one occasion together with the 7th SS Panzer Grenadier Regiment they were responsible for a major massacre in the village of Klisoura near Kastoria, that cost the lives of 250 women and children.

== Edessa and Florina Ohrana detachments ==
After their initial success in arming several villages in Kastoria, Kalchev went to the German occupied zone in order to start arming villages in Edessa region. In Edessa, with the help of the German occupation authorities, Kalchev created the Ohrana para-military unit. In 1943, Ohrana detachments counted a total of around 3,000 members and organized guerrilla activity. In the tradition of the IMRO Komitadjis, these bands pursued the local Greek population, including Greek-identifying Slavophones, Aromanians, and Pontic Greeks, seeing them as an obstacle to an all-Bulgarian Macedonia. The main leaders during the early phase of activity from 1941 to 1942 were Tsvetan Mladenov and Andon Kalchev in the Florina prefecture, where there were 600 men under arms.

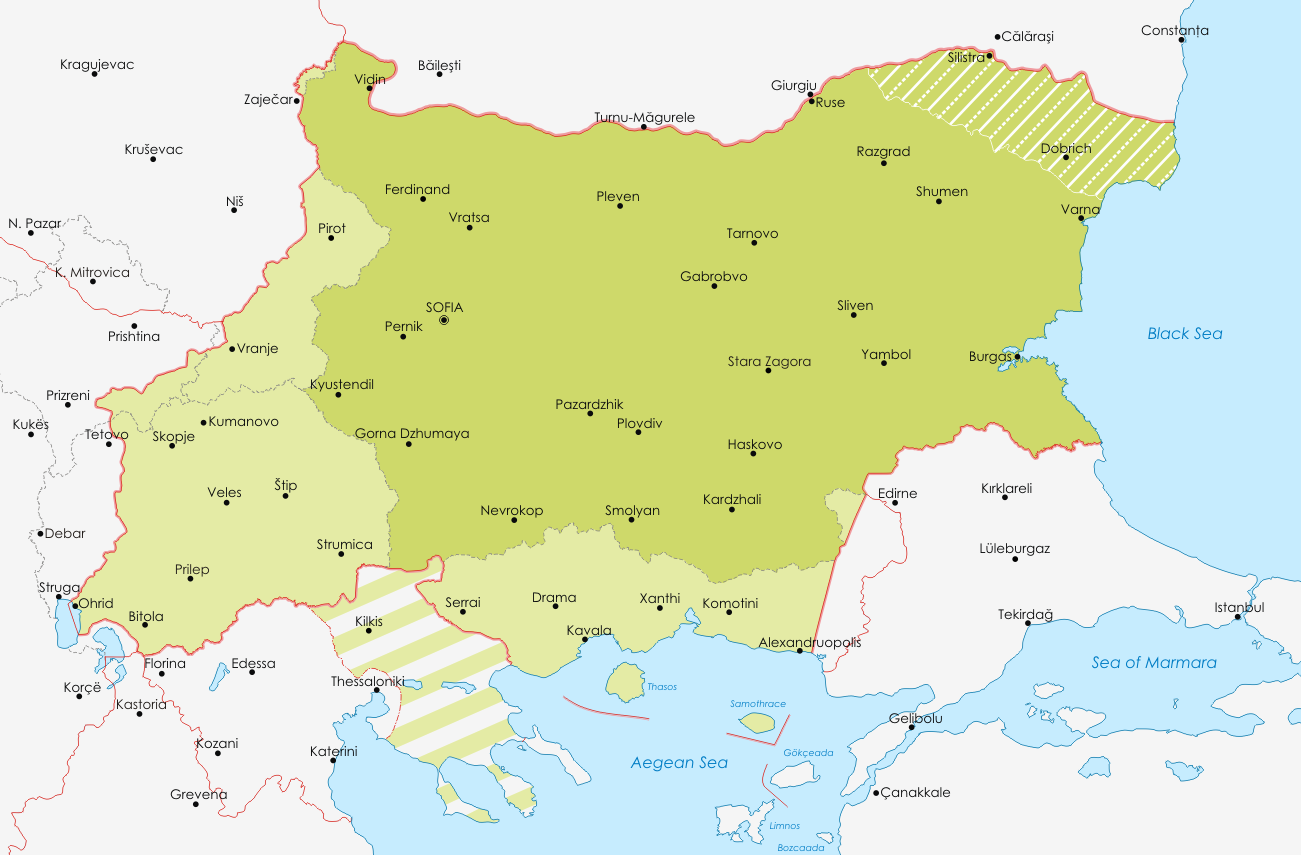
Bulgaria during WWII.

== Ohrana activity ==
In the summer of 1944, Ohrana constituted some 12,000 local fighters and volunteers from Bulgaria charged with protection of the local population. During 1944, whole Slavophone villages were armed by the occupation authorities to counterbalance the emerging power of the resistance and especially of Greek People's Liberation Army (ELAS). Ohrana was also fighting pro-communist Slavic Macedonians. and Greek communists — members of the ELAS. A part of the Slavophone population, with the help of the Greek Communist Party, organized itself into SNOF, and their prime objective was to struggle occupation forces and pro-Bulgarian agents in the Ohrana, and try to persuade its members to join ELAS and fight against the occupation. Nevertheless, in the summer of 1944, members of the Macedonian faction of the Communist Party of Greece were unable to distinguish friend from foe in Slav Macedonian villages. Mass involvement of the population was one of the tactics of Ohrana, which thus aims to provide good cover for its activities.

== Ohrana and Mihailov's plans for Macedonia ==
Ohrana was supported from Ivan Mihaylov too. In August 1943, Ivan Mihailov left Zagreb incognito for Germany where he was to visit the main headquarters of the Sicherheitsdienst. From German information, it is apparent that Mihailov received consent to create battalions consisting of volunteers armed with German weapons and munitions. Moreover, these battalions were to be under the operative command and disposal of Reichsfuhrer of the SS, Heinrich Himmler. Additionally, in Sofia talks were held between high-ranking functionaries of the SS and the IMRO Central Committee members. Despite the confidential character of the negotiations between Mihailov and the Sicherheitsdienst, the Bulgarian government obtained certain information about them. In this connection to the village companies in these counties, there was also formed three volunteer battalions in Kastoria, Florina and Edessa. These were organized by the Internal Macedonian Revolutionary Organization and were to carry the name "IMRO Volunteer Battalions". They were formed after the arrival of the IMRO cadres from the Sofia.

== Re-organization and clashes with ELAS ==
In spring 1944, the Germans taking up where the Italians left off, reformed, re-organized and re-armed the village companies in the Kastoria district. Soon after the villages in the Edessa and Florina districts were also armed and prepared for service. The militiamen from the Kastoria and Edessa districts were actively involved in the German anti-guerilla sweep operations. In June 1944 delegation of IMRO cadres met up with the German Commander in Edessa with whom they discussed the formation of the volunteer corps. This was in accordance with the agreement Ivan Mihailov and IMRO struck with Hitler and Himmler, which envisaged that these battalions would form the avant-garde of the whole Macedonian military effort in Western Macedonia and would spearhead the drives and sweeps against the ELAS forces. However, the guerrilla bands of EAM/ELAS soon forced Ohrana to retreat and disbanded many of its groups. In one report of Colonel Mirchev to the staff of the army on 5 June 1944, it was reported that the ELAS fighters took captive the local band consisting of 28 militiamen. On 21 August 1944 ELAS successfully attacked the IMRO stronghold at the village of Polikerason. During the battle, 20 IMRO militiamen were reported killed in action and 300 militiamen were captured. In September, two IMRO companies were wiped out in the defense of Edessa by an ELAS attack.

== Dissolution of Ohrana ==
After the declaration of war by Bulgaria on Nazi Germany in September 1944 Ivan Mihaylov arrived in German-occupied Skopje, where the Germans hoped that he could form a Macedonian puppet-state with their support. Seeing that Germany had lost the war, he refused. Ohrana was dissolved in late 1944 after their German and Bulgarian protectors were forced to withdraw from Greece. In autumn 1944 Anton Kalchev escaped northern Greece, and tried to flee with the retreating German army, but was captured in the vicinity of Bitola by communist partisans from Vardar Macedonia, and was apprehended to ELAS officials. In Thessaloniki, Kalchev was put on trial as a military criminal and was sentenced to death by the Greek authorities.

After World War II the ruling Bulgarian Communists declared the Slav-speaking population in Macedonia (including the Bulgarian part) as ethnic Macedonians. The organizations of the IMRO in Bulgaria were completely destroyed. Also, the internment of those people disagreeing with these political activities was organized at the Belene labor camp. Tito and Georgi Dimitrov worked about the project to merge the two Balkan countries Bulgaria and Yugoslavia into a Balkan Federative Republic according to the projects of Balkan Communist Federation. This led to the 1947 cooperation and signing of Bled Agreement. It foresaw unification between Yugoslav ("Vardar") and Bulgarian ("Pirin") Macedonia, as well as a return of the so-called Western Outlands to Bulgaria. They also supported the Greek Communists and especially Slavic-Macedonian National Liberation Front in the Greek Civil War with the idea of unification of Greek Macedonia and Western Thrace to the new state under Communist rule.

By this situation, the Macedonian section of the Greek Communist Party created the SNOF and some of the former collaborators enlisted in the new unit. and took part in the Greek Civil War on the side of the Democratic Army of Greece. To an extent the collaboration of the peasants with the Germans, Italians, Bulgarians or ELAS was determined by the geopolitical position of each village. Depending upon whether their village was vulnerable to attack by the Greek communist guerrillas, or the occupation forces, the peasants would opt to support the side in relation to which they were most vulnerable. In both cases, the attempt was to promise "freedom" (autonomy or independence) to the formerly persecuted Slavic minority as a means of gaining its support.

== Aftermath ==
After the Greek Civil War many from these people were expelled from Greece. Although the People's Republic of Bulgaria originally accepted very few refugees, government policy changed and the Bulgarian government actively sought out ethnic Macedonian refugees. It is estimated that approximately 2,500 children were sent to Bulgaria and 3,000 partisans fled there in the closing period of the war. There was a larger flow into Bulgaria of refugees as the Bulgarian Army pulled out of the Drama-Serres region in 1944. A large proportion of Slavic speakers emigrated there. The "Slavic Committee" in Sofia (Bulgarian: Славянски Комитет) helped to attract refugees that had settled in other parts of the Eastern Bloc. According to a political report in 1962 the number of political emigrants from Greece numbered at 6,529. The policy of communist Bulgaria towards the refugees from Greece was, at least initially, not discriminative with regard to their ethnic origin: Greek- and Slav-speakers were both categorized as Greek political emigrants and received equal treatment by state authorities. However, certain institutions of communist Bulgaria, charged with the national policy, tried progressively to promote certain selection among them privileging Slav-speakers, frequently named ethnic Macedonians and to prescribe special measures for the attainment of their "ethnic" loyalty. Unlike the other countries in the Eastern Bloc, there were no specific organizations founded to deal with specific issues relating to the child refugees, this caused many to cooperate with the "Association of Refugee Children from the Aegean part of Macedonia", an association based in the Socialist Republic of Macedonia. However, the end of the 1950s and the beginning of the 1960s was marked by a decisive turn in the "Macedonistic" policy of Bulgaria, which did not recognize anymore the existence of a Macedonian ethnicity different from the Bulgarian one. As a result, the trend to a discriminative policy, the refugees from Greece – more targeted at the Slav-speakers and less to "ethnic Greeks" – was given a certain proselytizing aspect. In 1960, the Bulgarian Communist Party voted a special resolution explained “with the fact that almost all the Macedonians have a clear Bulgarian national consciousness and consider Bulgaria their homeland. Eventually, many of these migrants were assimilated into Bulgarian society.

== See also ==
- Democratic Army of Greece
- Security Battalions
- Internal Macedonian Revolutionary Organization (IMRO)
- Slavic-speakers of Greek Macedonia
- Macedonian Question
- Military history of Bulgaria during World War II
- Axis occupation of Greece during World War II
- National Liberation Front (Greece)
- National Liberation Front (Macedonia)
