= Dobruševo =

Dobruševo Добрушево
- Village
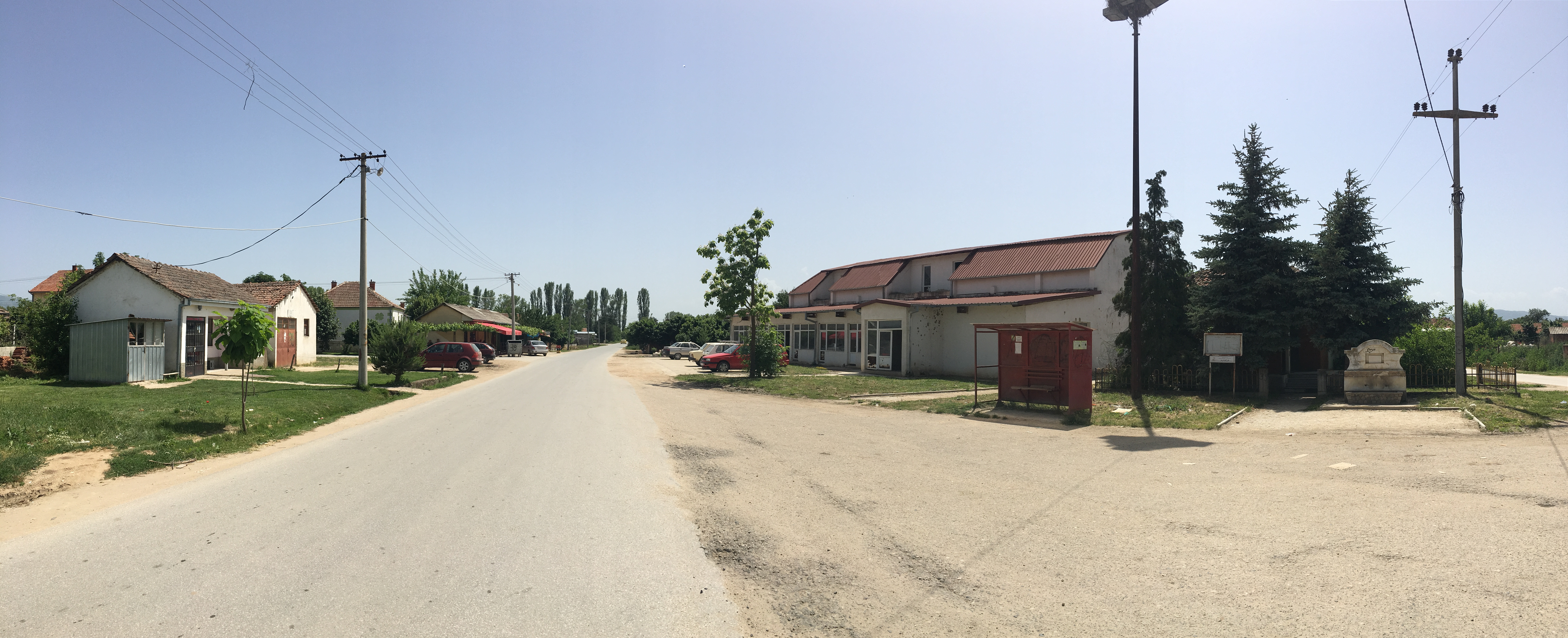
- View of the village

- Location within North Macedonia
- Coordinates: 41.168702°N 21.482458°E
- Country: North Macedonia
- Region: Pelagonia
- Municipality: Mogila

Population (2002)
  - Total: 624
- Time zone: UTC+1 (CET)
  - Summer (DST): UTC+2 (CEST)
- Website: .

Dobruševo (Macedonian: Добрушево) is a village in the Mogila Municipality of North Macedonia, and is located at 41.169°N 21.483°E. It used to be a municipality of its own and its FIPS code was MK26.

== Demographics ==
According to the 2002 census, the village had a total of 624 inhabitants. Ethnic groups in the village include:

- Macedonians 624
