= Mogila Municipality =

Municipality of North Macedonia

Coordinates: 41.11°N 21.39°E

Municipality of Mogila Општина Могила
- Municipality
- Flag Coat of arms

- Country: North Macedonia
- Region: Pelagonia
- Municipal seat: Mogila

Government
  - Mayor: Dragančo Sabotkovski (VMRO-DPMNE)

Area
  - Total: 255.62 km^{2} (98.70 sq mi)

Population
  - Total: 5,283
- Time zone: UTC+1 (CET)
- Vehicle registration: BT

Mogila (Macedonian: Могила) is a municipality in south-central North Macedonia. Mogila is also the name of the village where the municipal seat is located. The Mogila Municipality is part of the Pelagonia Statistical Region.

== Geography ==
The municipality borders the Demir Hisar Municipality to the northwest, the Kruševo and Krivogaštani Municipalities to the north, the Prilep Municipality to the northeast, the Novaci Municipality to the southeast, and the Bitola Municipality to the southwest.

== Demographics ==
According to the 2021 North Macedonia census, this municipality has 5,283 inhabitants. Ethnic groups in the municipality include:

	2002		2021	
	Number	%	Number	%
TOTAL	6,710	100	5,283	100
Macedonians	6,432	95.86	4,632	87.68
Turks	229	3.41	266	5.04
Albanians	34	0.51	73	1.38
Roma	6	0.09	15	0.28
Vlachs			2	0.04
Serbs	2	0.03	1	0.02
Other / Undeclared / Unknown	7	0.37	38	0.71
Persons for whom data are taken from administrative sources			256	4.85
