= Demographic history of Macedonia =

The modern region of Macedonia, as defined in the middle of the 19th century, spans several countries in southeastern Europe. It is known to have been inhabited since Paleolithic times.

== Ancient period ==
=== Еarliest historical inhabitants of the region of Macedonia ===
The earliest historical inhabitants of the region were the Pelasgians, the Bryges, the Paeonians and the Thracians. The Pelasgians occupied Emathia and the Bryges occupied northern Epirus, as well as Macedonia, mainly west of the Axios River and parts of Mygdonia. Thracians, in early times occupied mainly the eastern parts of Macedonia, (Mygdonia, Crestonia, Bisaltia).

The Ancient Macedonians are missing from early historical accounts because they had been living in the southern extremities of the region – the Orestian highlands – since before the Dark Ages. The Macedonian tribes subsequently moved down from Orestis in the upper Haliacmon due to pressure from the Orestae. (Note: Anna Panayotou describes the geographical delimitations of ancient Macedon as encompassing the region from Mount Pindus to the Nestos River, and from Thessaly to Paeonia (the area occupied by the kingdom of Philip II, corresponding in most respects with the Roman province of the same name).) The name of the region of Macedonia (Greek: Μακεδονία, Makedonia) derives from the tribal name of the ancient Macedonians (Greek: Μακεδόνες, Makedónes, Makedones). According to the Greek historian Herodotus, Makednon (Greek: Mακεδνόν) was an alternative name for the Doric ethnos and specifically for the Dorian tribe that stayed behind during the great southward migration of the Dorian Greeks. The word "Makednos" is cognate with the Doric Greek word "Μάκος" Μakos (Attic form Μήκος – "mékos"), which is Greek for "length". The ancient Macedonians took this name either because they were physically tall, or because they settled in the mountains. The latter definition would translate "Macedonian" as "Highlander".

=== Expansion of the kingdom of Macedon ===
Macedonia in antiquity.

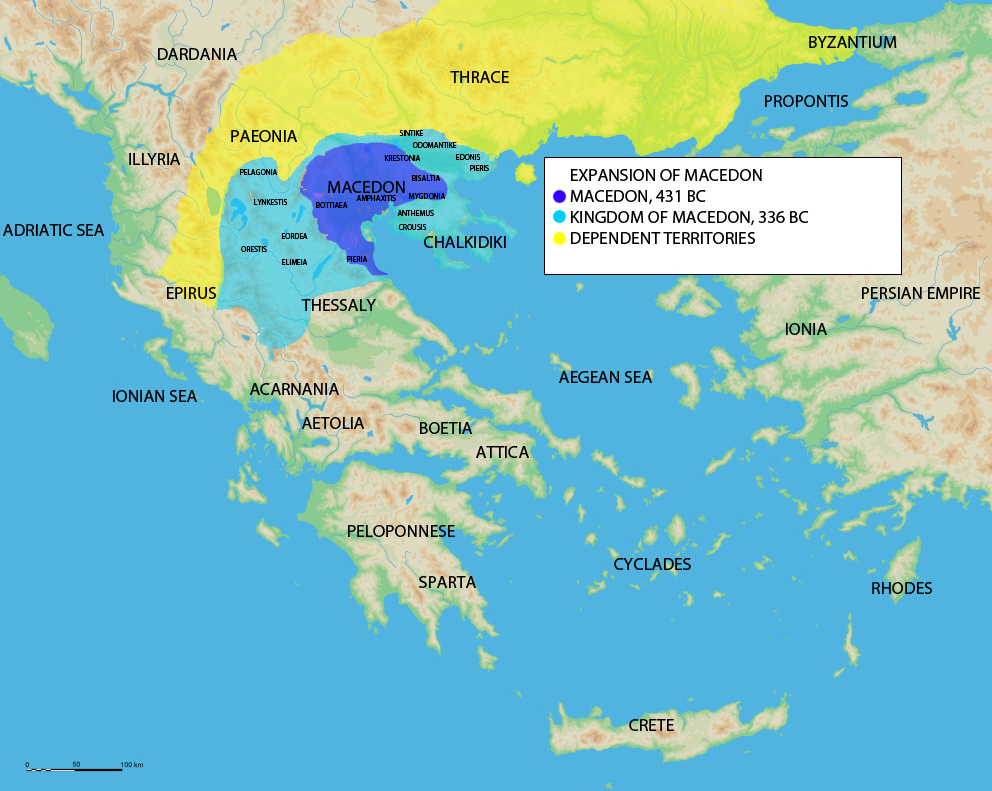
Expansion of Macedon

The Macedonians (Greek: Μακεδόνες, Makedónes) were an ancient tribe that lived on the alluvial plain around the rivers Haliacmon and lower Axios in the northeastern part of mainland Greece. Essentially an ancient Greek people, they gradually expanded from their homeland along the Haliacmon valley on the northern edge of the Greek world, absorbing or driving out neighbouring non-Greek tribes, primarily Thracian and Illyrian. They spoke Ancient Macedonian, which is usually classified as a Northwest Doric Greek dialect or occasionally as a Hellenic language. However, the prestige language of the region was at first Attic and then Koine Greek. Their religious beliefs mirrored those of other Greeks, following the main deities of the Greek pantheon, although the Macedonians continued Archaic burial practices that had ceased in other parts of Greece after the 6th century BC. Aside from the monarchy, the core of Macedonian society was its nobility. Similar to the aristocracy of neighboring Thessaly, their wealth was largely built on herding horses and cattle.

=== Roman province ===
Roman province of Macedonia.

After the defeat of Andriscus in 148 BC, Macedonia officially became a province of the Roman Republic in 146 BC. Hellenization of the non-Greek population was not yet complete in 146 BC, and many of the Thracian and Illyrian tribes had preserved their languages. It is also possible that the ancient Macedonian tongue was still spoken, alongside Koine, the common Greek language of the Hellenistic era. From an early period, the Roman province of Macedonia included Epirus, Thessaly, parts of Thrace and Illyria, thus making the region of Macedonia permanently lose any connection with its ancient borders, and now be the home of a greater variety of inhabitants.

== Middle Ages ==
Part of the Byzantine Empire in 1045 under Emperor Basil II (reigned 976-1025

Taking advantage of the desolation left by the nomadic tribes, Slavs settled in the Balkan Peninsula from the 6th century AD. (see also: South Slavs). Aided by the Avars and by Turkic Bulgars, Slavic tribes in the 6th century started a gradual invasion into the lands of Byzantium. They infiltrated into Macedonia and reached as far south as Thessaly and the Peloponnese, settling in isolated regions that the Byzantines called Sclavinias, until they were gradually pacified. Many Slavs came to serve as soldiers in Byzantine armies and settled in other parts of the Byzantine Empire. Slavic settlers assimilated many among the Romanised and Hellenised Paeonian, Illyrian and Thracian population of Macedonia, but pockets of tribes that fled to the mountains remained independent. Greek historiography considers that present-day Aromanians (Vlachs), Sarakatsani and Albanians originate from these mountainous populations, a fact disputed by other national historiographies. The interaction between Romanised and non-Romanised indigenous peoples and the Slavs resulted in linguistic similarities which are reflected in modern Bulgarian, Albanian, Romanian and Macedonian, all of them members of the Balkan language area. The Slavs also occupied the hinterland of Thessaloniki, launching consecutive attacks on the city in 584, 586, 609, 620, and 622 AD, but never taking it. Detachments of Avars often joined the Slavs in their onslaughts, but the Avars did not form any lasting settlements in the region. A branch of the Bulgars led by khan Kuber, however, settled in western Macedonia and eastern Albania around 680 AD and also engaged in attacks on Byzantium together with the Slavs. By this time, several different ethnicities inhabited the whole Macedonia region, with South Slavs forming the overall majority in the northern fringes of Macedonia while Greeks dominated the highlands of western Macedonia, the central plains, and the coastline.

== Ottoman rule ==
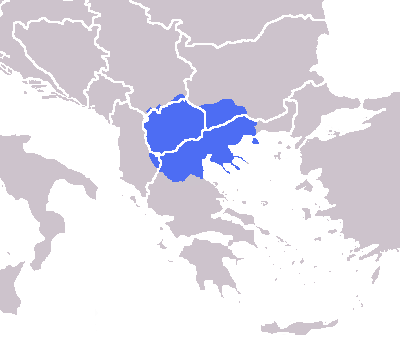
The geographical region of Macedonia

=== Muslims and Christians ===
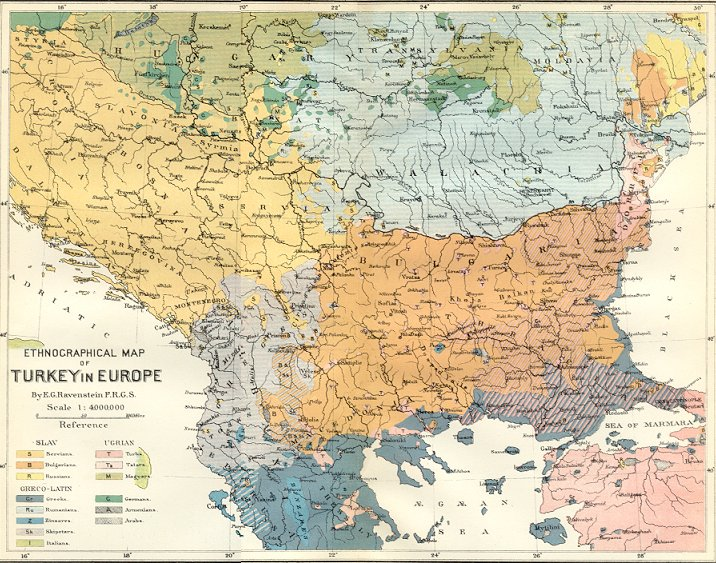
Ethnic composition of the central Balkans in 1870 by the English-German cartographer E.G. Ravenstein.

The initial period of Ottoman rule led a depopulation of the plains and river valleys of Macedonia. The Christian population there fled to the mountains. Ottomans were largely brought from Asia Minor and settled parts of the region. Towns destroyed in Vardar Macedonia during the conquest were renewed, this time populated exclusively by Muslims. The Ottoman element in Macedonia was especially strong in the 17th and the 18th century with travellers defining the majority of the population, especially the urban one, as Muslim. The Ottoman population, however, sharply declined at the end of the 18th and the beginning of the 19th century on account of the incessant wars led by the Ottoman Empire, the low birth rate and the higher death toll of the frequent plague epidemics among Muslims than among Christians.

The Ottoman–Habsburg War (1683–1699), the subsequent flight of a substantial part of the Serbian population in Kosovo to Austria and the reprisals and looting during the Ottoman counteroffensive led to an influx of Albanian Muslims into Kosovo, northern and northwestern Macedonia. Being in the position of power, the Albanian Muslims managed to push out their Christian neighbours and conquered additional territories in the 18th and the 19th centuries. Pressures from central government following the first Russo-Turkish war that ended in 1774 and in which Ottoman Greeks were implicated as a "fifth column" led to the superficial Islamization of several thousand Greek-speakers in western Macedonia. These Greek Muslims retained their Greek language and identity, remained Crypto-Christians, and were subsequently called Vallahades by local Greek Orthodox Christians because apparently the only Turkish-Arabic they ever bothered to learn was how to say "wa-llahi" or "by Allah". The destruction and abandoning of the Christian Aromanian city of Moscopole and other important Aromanian settlements in the southern Albania (Epirus-Macedonia) region in the second half of the 18th century caused a large-scale migration of thousands of Aromanians to the cities and villages of Western Macedonia, most notably to Bitola, Krushevo and surrounding regions. Thessaloniki also became the home of a large Jewish population following Spain's expulsions of Jews after 1492. The Jews later formed small colonies in other Macedonian cities, most notably Bitola and Serres.

=== Hellenic idea ===
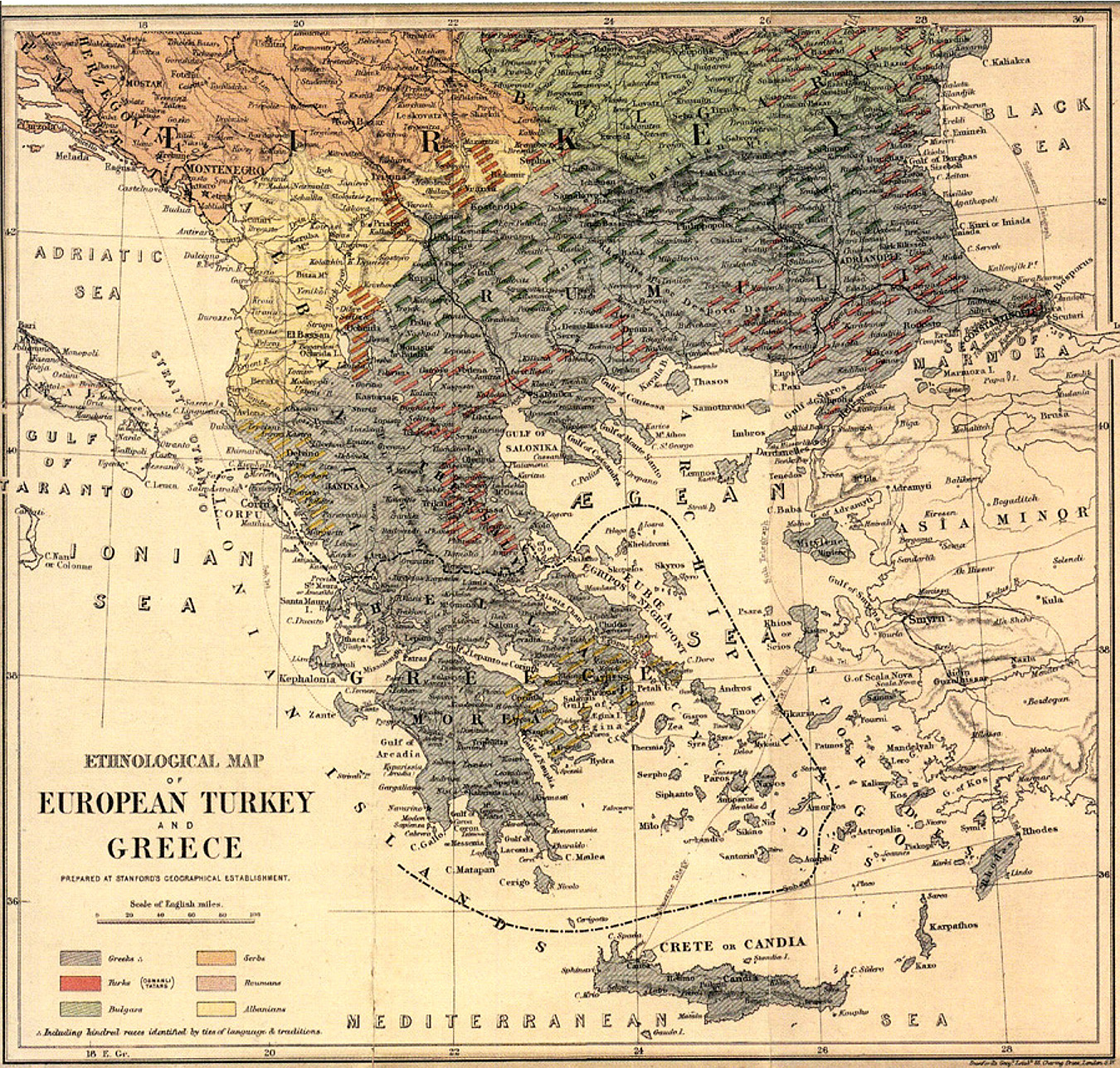
Pro-Greek ethnic map of the Balkans by Ioannis Gennadius, which covers most of the peninsula with the color associated with the Greeks. In particular it considers the Slavic population of northern Macedonia and Thrace as Greek. Published by the English cartographer E. Stanford in 1877.

The rise of European nationalism in the 18th century led to the expansion of the Hellenic idea in Macedonia. Its main pillar throughout the centuries of Ottoman rule had been the indigenous Greek population of historical Macedonia. Under the influence of the Greek schools and the Patriarchate of Constantinople, however, it started to spread among the other orthodox subjects of the Empire as the urban Christian population of Slavic and Albanian origin started to view itself increasingly as Greek. The Greek language became a symbol of civilization and a basic means of communication between non-Muslims. The process of Hellenization was additionally reinforced after the abolition of the Bulgarian Archbishopric of Ohrid in 1767. Though with a predominantly Greek clergy, the Archbishopric did not yield to the direct order of Constantinople and had autonomy in many vital domains. However, the poverty of the Christian peasantry and the lack of proper schooling in villages preserved the linguistic diversity of the Macedonian countryside. The Hellenic idea reached its peak during the Greek War of Independence (1821–1829) which received the active support of the Greek Macedonian population as part of their struggle for the resurrection of Greek statehood. According to the Istituto Geografiko de Agostini of Rome, in 1903 in the vilayets of Selanik and Monastir Greek was the dominant language of instruction in the region:

Language	Schools	Pupils
Greek	998	59,640
Bulgarian	561	18,311
Romanian	49	2,002
Serbian	53	1,674

== Macedonian question ==
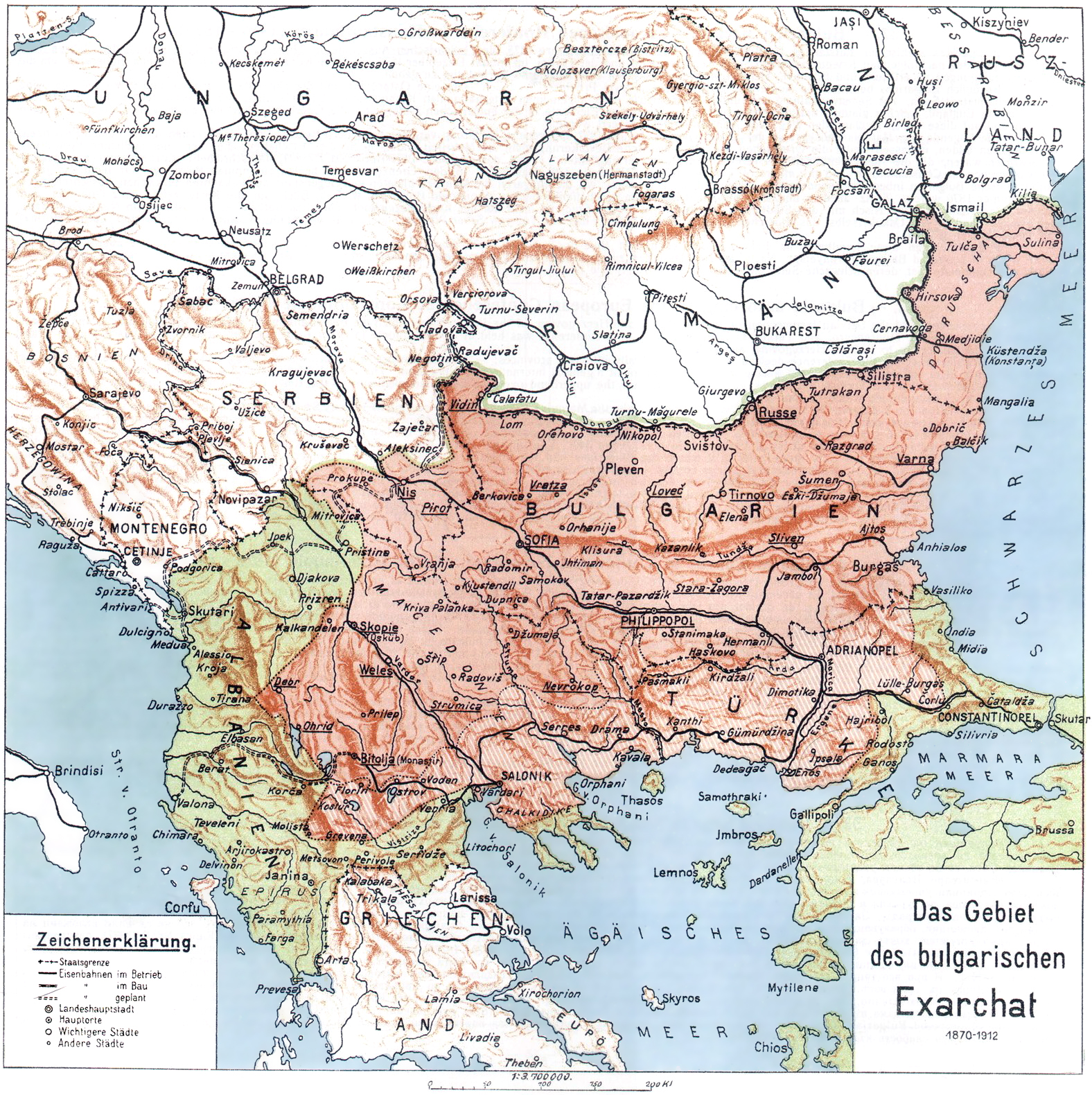
Map of the Bulgarian Exarchate (1870–1913).

In Europe, the classic non-national states were the multi-ethnic empires such as the Ottoman Empire, ruled by a Sultan and the population belonged to many ethnic groups, which spoke many languages. The idea of nation state was an increasing emphasis during the 19th century, on the ethnic and racial origins of the nations. The most noticeable characteristic was the degree to which nation-states use the state as an instrument of national unity, in economic, social and cultural life. By the 19th century, the Ottomans had fallen well behind the rest of Europe in science, technology, and industry.

=== Bulgarian propaganda ===
By that time Bulgarians had initiated a purposeful struggle against the Greek clerics. Bulgarian religious leaders had realised that any further struggle for the rights of the Bulgarians in the Ottoman Empire could not succeed unless they managed to obtain at least some degree of autonomy from the Patriarchate of Constantinople. The foundation of the Bulgarian Exarchate in 1870, which included most of Macedonia by a firman of Sultan Abdülaziz was the direct result of the struggle of the Bulgarian Orthodox against the domination of the Greek Patriarchate of Constantinople in the 1850s and 1860s.

Afterward, in 1876 the Bulgarians revolted in the April Uprising. The emergence of Bulgarian national sentiments was closely related to the re-establishment of the independent Bulgarian church. This rise of national awareness became known as the Bulgarian National Revival. However, the uprising was crushed by the Ottomans. As a result, on the Constantinople Conference in 1876 the predominant Bulgarian character of the Slavs in Macedonia reflected in the borders of future autonomous Bulgaria as it was drawn there. The Great Powers eventually gave their consent to variant, which excluded historical Macedonia and Thrace, and denied Bulgaria access to the Aegean Sea, but otherwise incorporated all other regions in the Ottoman Empire inhabited by Bulgarians. At the last minute, however, the Ottomans rejected the plan with the secret support of Britain. Having its reputation at stake, Russia had no other choice but to declare war on the Ottomans in April 1877. The Treaty of San Stefano from 1878, which reflected the maximum desired by Russian expansionist policy, gave Bulgaria the whole of Macedonia except Thessaloniki, the Chalcidice peninsula and the valley of the Aliakmon.

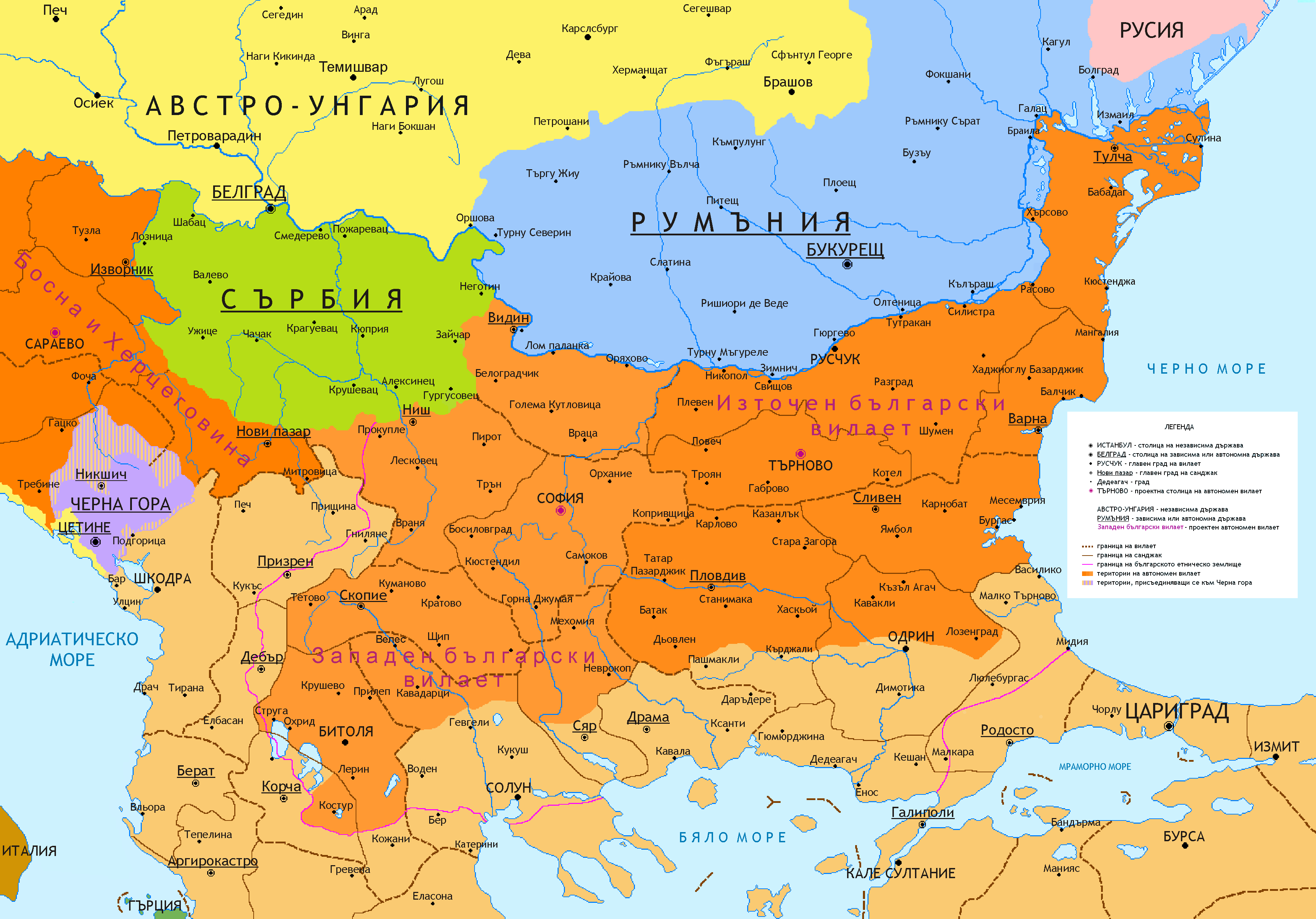
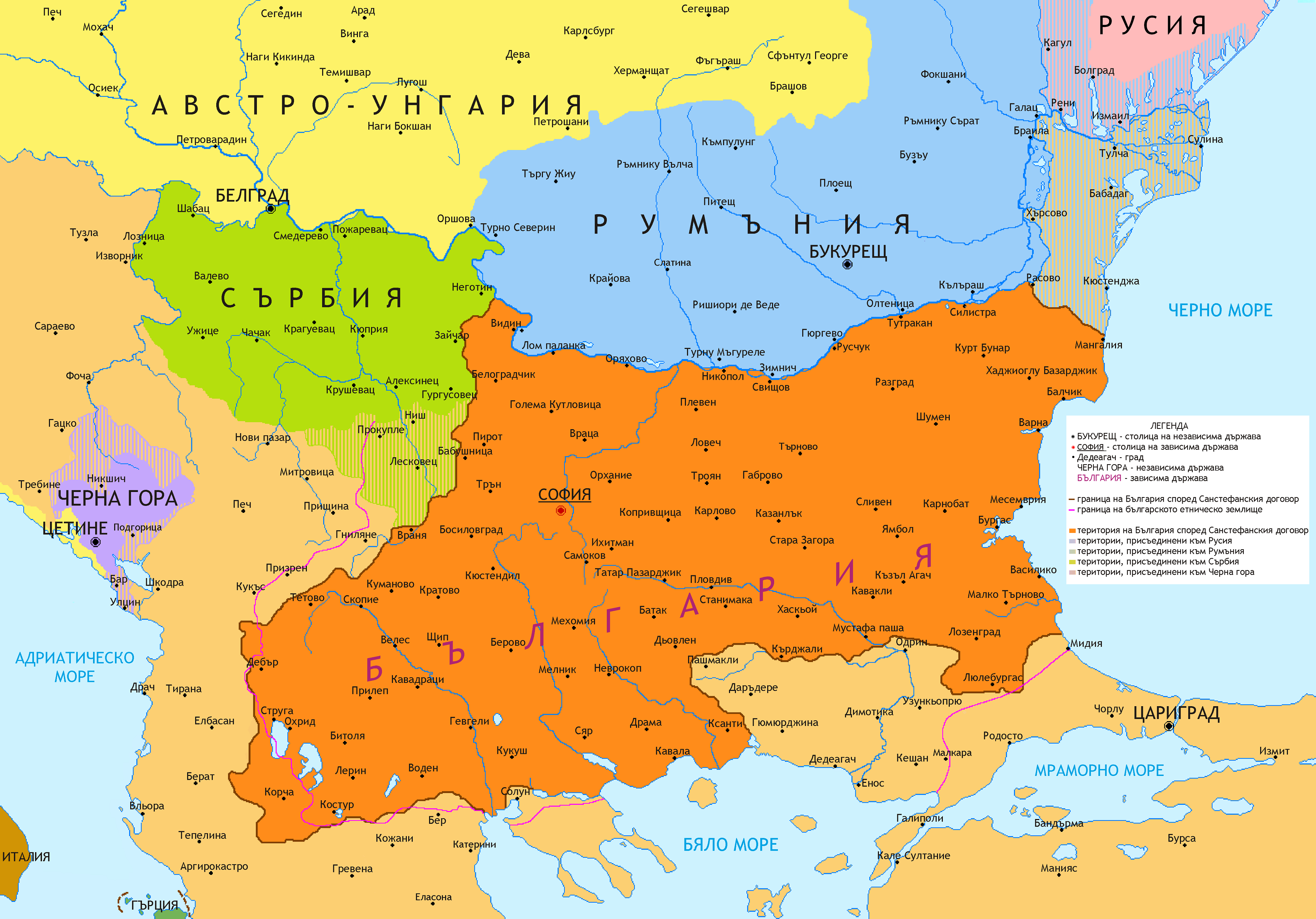
Bulgaria after the Conference of Constantinople of 1876 (left) and after the Treaty of San Stefano of 1878 (right).

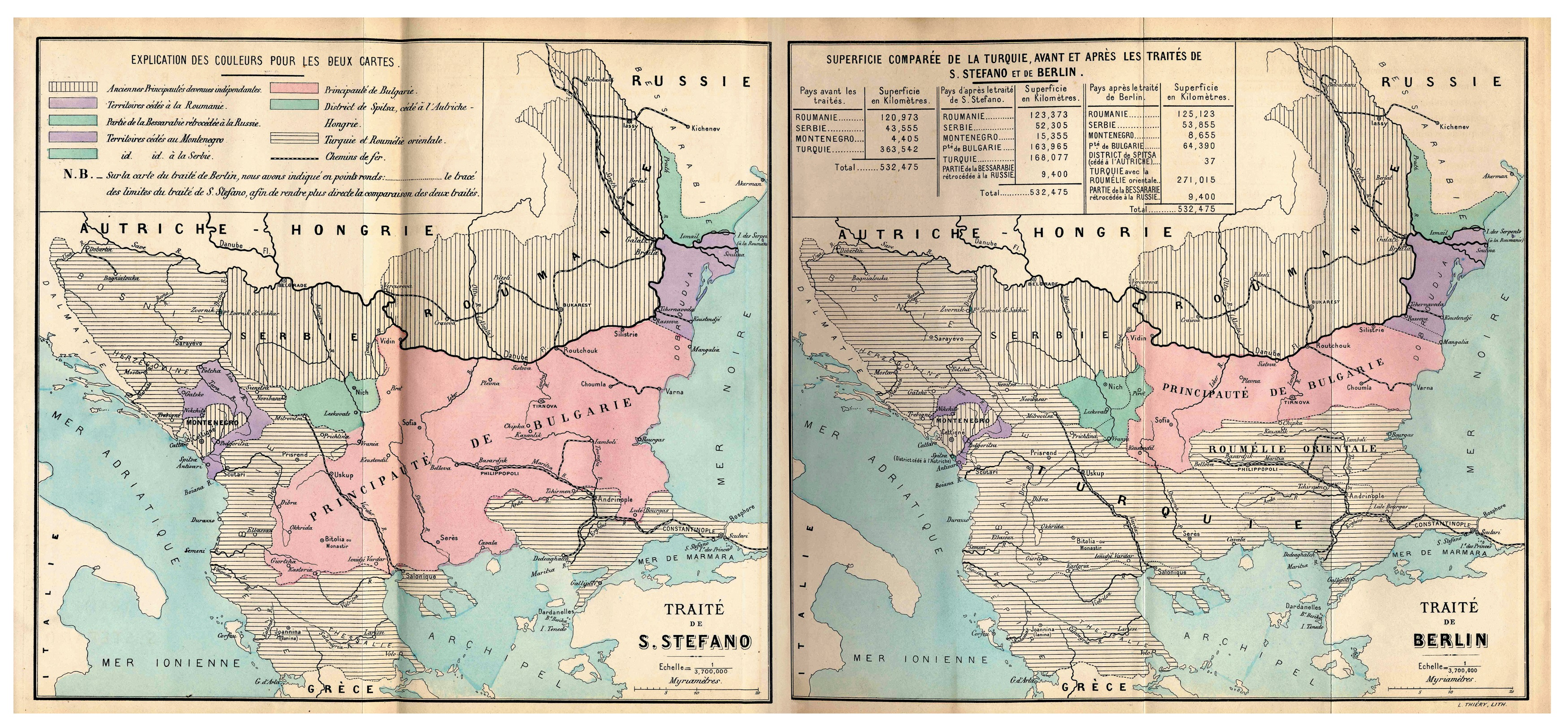
Maps of the region after the Treaty of San Stefano (left) and after the Congress of Berlin of 1878 (right).

The Congress of Berlin in the same year redistributed most Bulgarian territories that the previous treaty had given to the Principality of Bulgaria back to the Ottoman Empire. This included the whole of Macedonia. As a result, in late 1878, the Kresna–Razlog uprising – an unsuccessful Bulgarian revolt against the Ottoman rule in the region of Macedonia – broke out. However the decision taken at the Congress of Berlin soon turned the Macedonian question into "the apple of constant discord" between Serbia, Greece and Bulgaria. The Bulgarian national revival in Macedonia was not unopposed. The Greeks and Serbs, too, had national ambitions in the region, and believed that these could be furthered by a policy of cultural and linguistic dissimilation of the Macedonian Slavs, to be achieved through educational and church propaganda. Nonetheless, by the 1870s the Bulgarians were clearly the dominant national party in Macedonia. It was widely anticipated that the Macedonian Slavs would continue to evolve as an integral part of the Bulgarian nation, and that, in the event of the Ottoman Empire's demise, Macedonia would be included in a Bulgarian successor-state. That these anticipations proved false was due not to any intrinsic peculiarities of the Macedonian Slavs, setting them apart from the Bulgarians, but to a series of catastrophic events, which, over a period of seventy years, diverted the course of Macedonian history away from its presumed trend.

=== Serbian propaganda ===
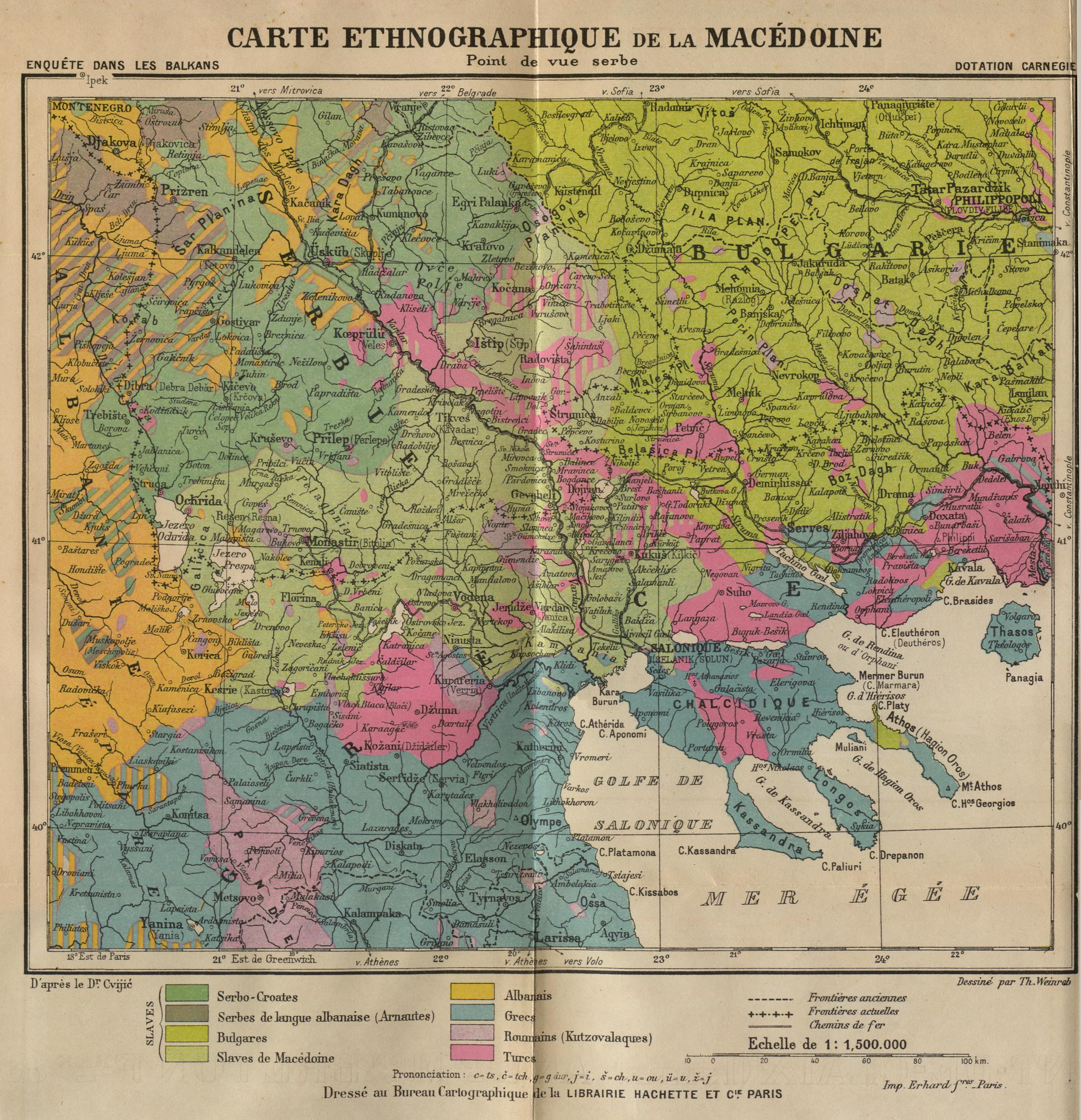
Ethnographic Map of Macedonia: Point of View of the Serbs. Author: Professor J.Cvijic, 1918

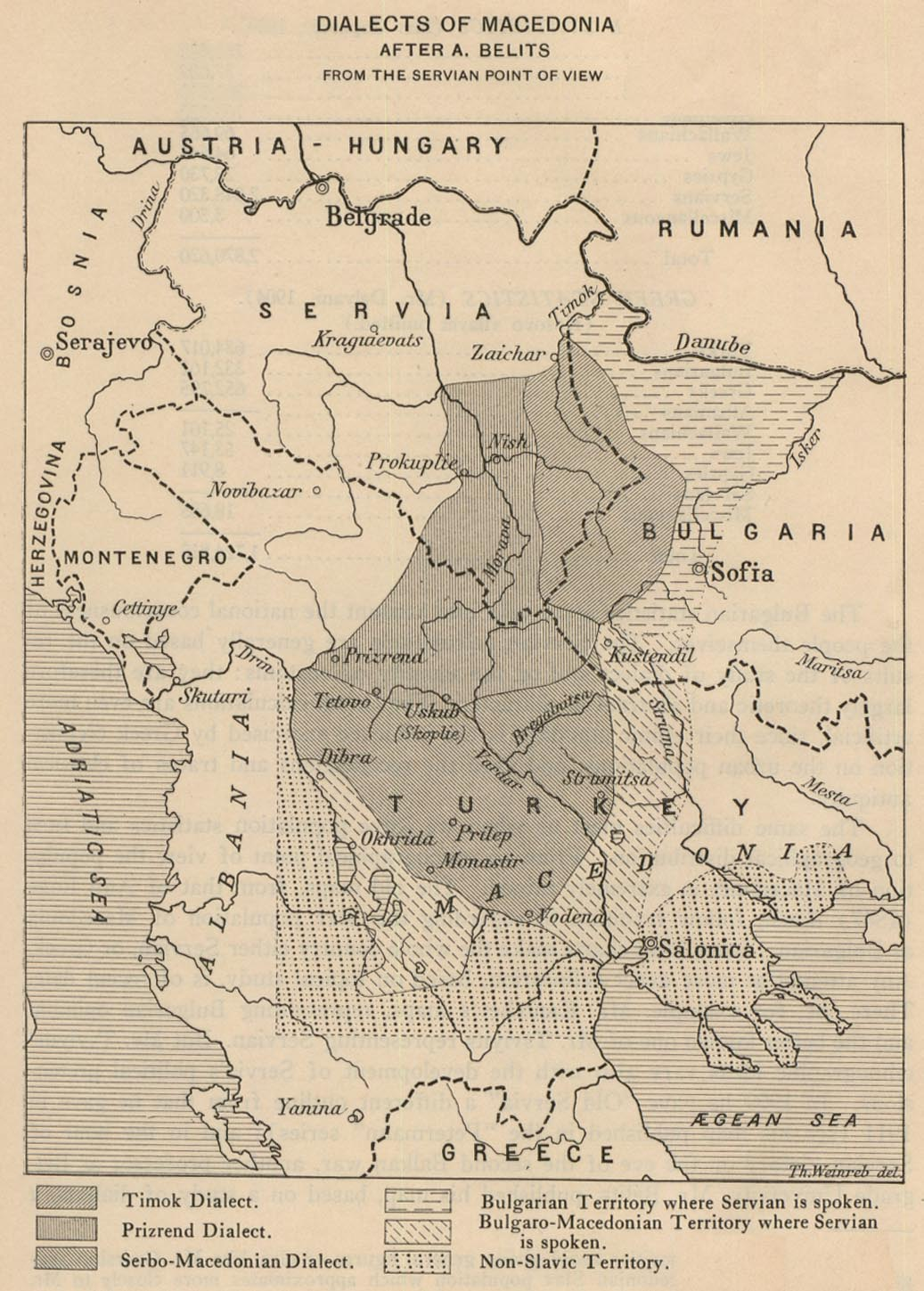
From the Serbian point of view, the Slavs of Macedonia were Serbian-speakers

A great contribution to the Serbian cause was made by an astronomer and historian from Trieste, Spiridon Gopčević (also known as Leo Brenner). Gopčević published in 1889 the ethnographic research Macedonia and Old Serbia, which defined more than three-quarters of the Macedonian population as Serbian.

The work of Gopčević was further developed by two Serbian scholars, geographer Jovan Cvijić and linguist Aleksandar Belić. Less extreme than Gopčević, Cvijić and Belić claimed only the Slavs of northern Macedonia were Serbian whereas those of southern Macedonia were identified as "Macedonian Slavs", an amorphous Slavic mass that was neither Bulgarian, nor Serbian but could turn out either Bulgarian or Serbian if the respective people were to rule the region.

=== Greek propaganda ===
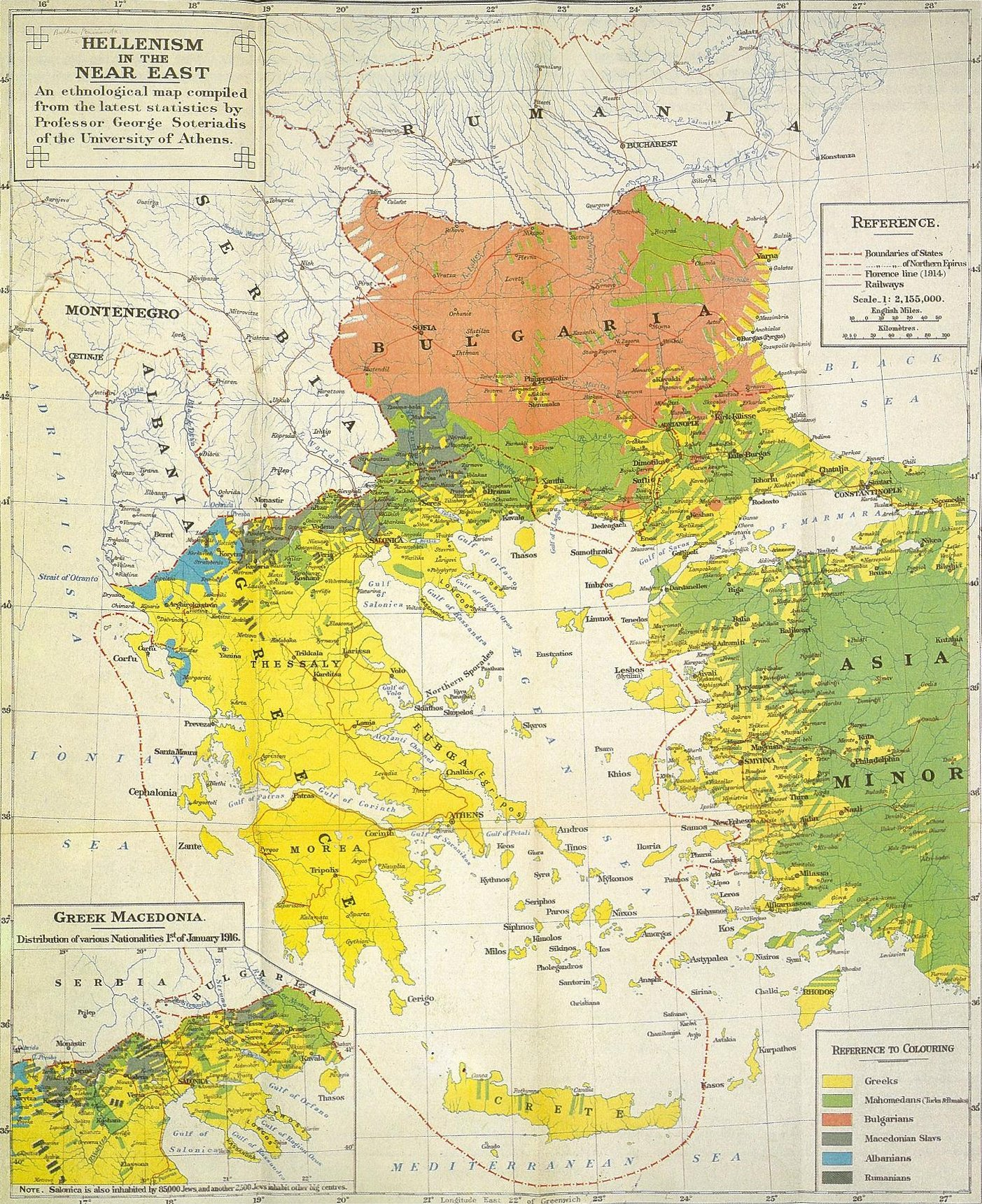
Greek ethnographic map by Professor George Soteriadis, University of Athens 1918.

It was established by the end of the 19th century that the majority of the population of central and Southern Macedonia (vilaets of Monastiri and Thessaloniki) were predominantly an ethnic Greek population, while the Northern parts of the region (vilaet of Skopje) were predominantly Slavic. Jews and Ottoman communities were scattered all over. Because of Macedonia's such polyethnic nature, the arguments which Greece used to promote its claim to the whole region were usually of historical and religious character. The Greeks consistently linked nationality to the allegiance to the Patriarchate of Constantinople. "Bulgarophone", "Albanophone" and "Vlachophone" Greeks were coined to describe the population who were Slavic, Albanian or Vlach (Aromanian)-speaking. There was also pressure on Aromanians to become linguistically dissimilated from the 18th century, when dissimilation efforts were encouraged by the Greek missionary Cosmas of Aetolia (1714–1779) who taught that Aromanians should speak Greek because as he said "it's the language of our Church" and established over 100 Greek schools in northern and western Greece. The offensive of the clergy against the use of Aromanian was by no means limited to religious issues but was a tool devised in order to convince the non-Greek speakers to abandon what they regarded as a "worthless" idiom and adopt the superior Greek speech: "There we are Metsovian brothers, together with those who are fooling themselves with this sordid and vile Aromanian language... forgive me for calling it a language", "repulsive speech with a disgusting diction".

=== Ethnic Macedonian propaganda ===
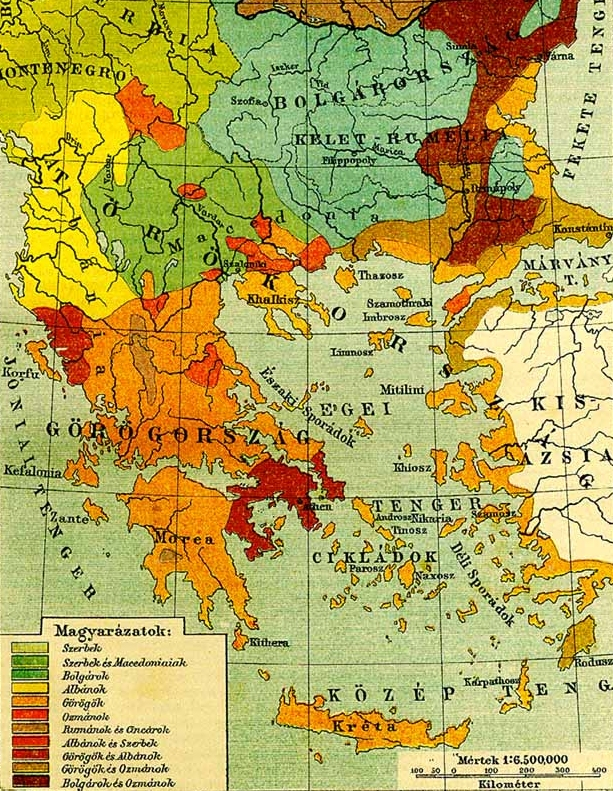
Ethnographic map of the Balkans (1897), in Hungarian, as seen in the Pallas Great Lexicon: Serbs Serbs and Macedonians Bulgarians Albanians Greeks Osmans Romanians and Tsintsars Albanians and Serbians Greeks and Albanians Greeks and Osmans Bulgarians and Osmans

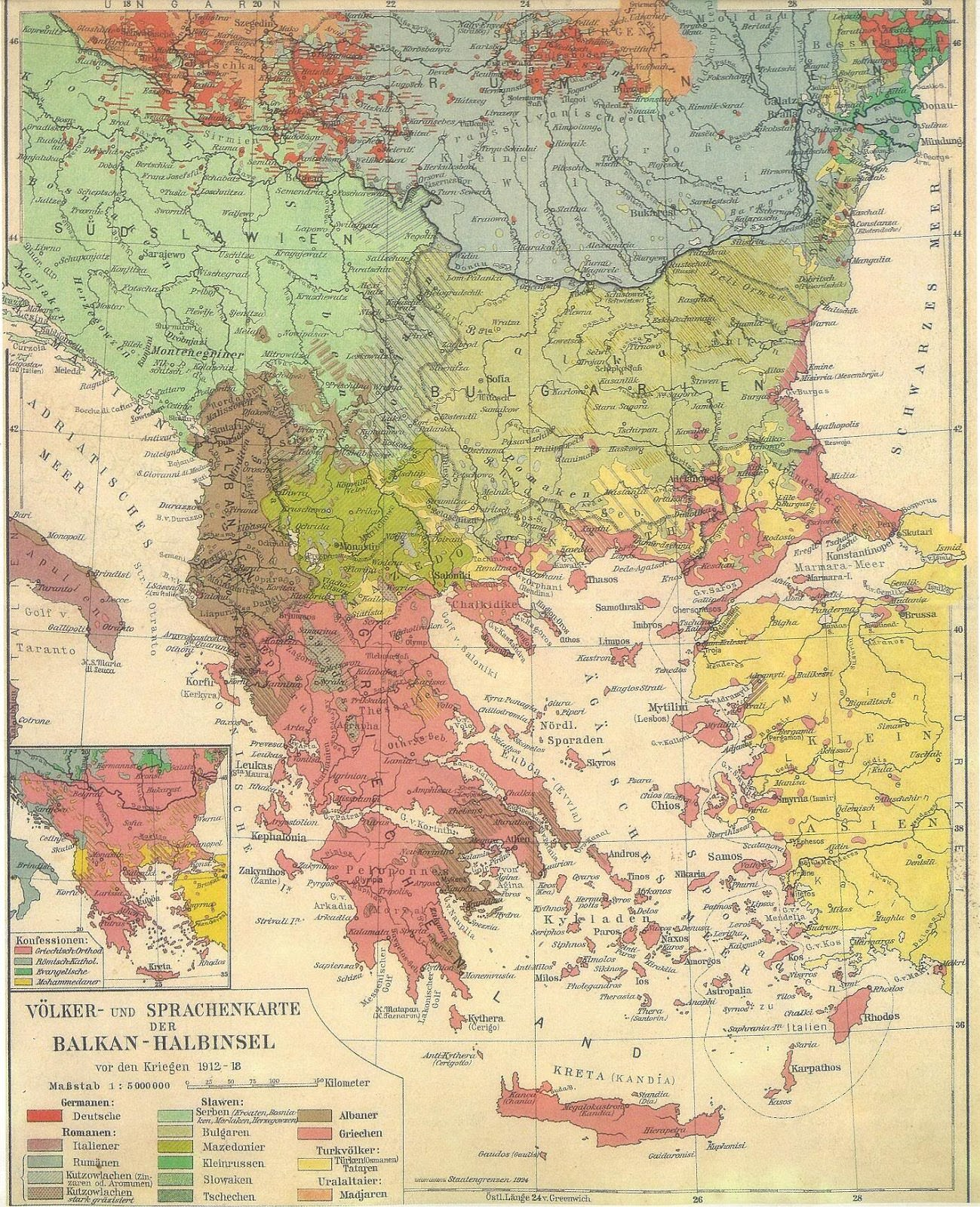
Peoples and languages map of the Balkan Peninsula before the wars 1912–18, in German (Historical Old Map Collection from 1924). Ethnic groups inhabiting Macedonia are: Albanians Bulgarians Greeks Macedonians Serbs Turks Vlachs

The ethnic Macedonian ideology during the second half of the 19th century was at its inception. One of the first preserved accounts is an article The Macedonian question by Petko Slaveykov, published on 18 January 1871 in the "Macedonia" newspaper in Constantinople. In this article Petko Slaveykov writes: "We have many times heard from the Macedonists that they are not Bulgarians, but they are rather Macedonians, descendants of the Ancient Macedonians". In a letter written to the Bulgarian Exarch in February 1874 Petko Slaveykov reports that discontentment with the current situation "has given birth among local patriots to the disastrous idea of working independently on the advancement of their own local dialect and what’s more, of their own, separate Macedonian church leadership."

In 1875 Gjorgjija Pulevski published in Belgrade a book called Dictionary of Three Languages (Rečnik od tri jezika). The text of the Rečnik contains programmatic statements where Pulevski argues for an independent Slavic Macedonian nation and language. It was the first work that publicly claimed Macedonian to be a separate language. In 1880 he published Slognica Rechovska in Sofia as an attempt at a grammar of the language of the Slavs who lived in Macedonia. Although he had no formal education, Pulevski published several other books, including three dictionaries and a collection of songs from Macedonia, customs, and holidays.

The first significant manifestation of ethnic Macedonian nationalism was the book On Macedonian Matters (Za Makedonskite Raboti) published in Sofia in 1903 by Krste Misirkov. In the book Misirkov advocated that the Slavs of Macedonia should take a separate way from the Bulgarians and the Bulgarian language. Misirkov considered that the term "Macedonian" should be used to define the whole Slavic population of Macedonia, obliterating the existing division between Greeks, Bulgarians and Serbians. The adoption of a separate "Macedonian language" was also advocated as a means of unification of the Ethnic Macedonians with Serbian, Bulgarian and Greek consciousness. On Macedonian Matters was written in the South Slavic dialect spoken in central Macedonia (Veles-Prilep-Bitola-Ohrid). This dialect was proposed by Misirkov as the basis for the future language, and, as Misirkov says, a dialect which is most different from all other neighboring languages (as the eastern dialect was too close to Bulgarian and the northern one too close to Serbian). Misirkov calls this language Macedonian.

While Misirkov talked about the Macedonian consciousness and the Macedonian language as a future goal, he described the wider region of Macedonia in the early 20th century as inhabited by Bulgarians, Greeks, Serbs, Turks, Albanians, Aromanians, and Jews. As regards the ethnic Macedonians themselves, Misirkov maintained that they had called themselves Bulgarians until the publication of the book and were always called Bulgarians by independent observers until 1878 when the Serbian views also started to get recognition. He also explained that the reason for that was because local Slavs were allies with the Bulgars in the wars against Byzantine Empire and because of that Byzantine Greeks renamed them into "Bulgarians", in that way the term became an identification for Macedonian Slavs in the future. Misirkov rejected the ideas in On Macedonian Matters later and turned into a staunch advocate of the Bulgarian cause. He returned to the ethnic Macedonian idea again in the 1920s.

Another prominent activist for the ethnic Macedonian national revival was Dimitrija Čupovski, who was one of the founders and the president of the Macedonian Literary Society established in Saint Petersburg in 1902. During the 1913–14 period, Čupovski published the newspaper Makedonski Golos' (Македонскi Голосъ) (meaning Macedonian voice) in which he and fellow members of the Petersburg Macedonian Colony propagandized the existence of a separate Macedonian people different from Greeks, Bulgarians and Serbs, and were struggling for popularizing the idea for an independent Macedonian state.

During the 1920s and 30s the idea was promoted by some of the leftist members of the Macedonian Federative Organization and later IMRO (United) and also by some members of the Communist Party of Yugoslavia. In 1934 the Comintern in coordination with IMRO (United) published a resolution on the Macedonian question in which for the first time, an authoritative international organization has recognized the existence of a separate Macedonian nation and Macedonian language.

The ideas of Misirkov, Pulevski and other Macedonians would remain largely unnoticed until World War II when they were adopted by the Macedonian Partisans movement which in 1944 set up the Anti-fascist Assembly for the National Liberation of Macedonia and proclaimed a Macedonian nation-state of ethnic Macedonians. They made Macedonian the official language of the Macedonian state further influencing its codification in 1945. The state was later incorporated in the Socialist Federal Republic of Yugoslavia. The present-day historians from North Macedonia claim that IMRO was split into two factions: the first aimed an ethnic Macedonian state, and the second believed in a Macedonia as a part of wider Bulgarian entity. These claims of present-day historians from North Macedonia that the "Autonomists" in IMRO who defended a Macedonian position are largely ungrounded. IMRO regarded itself – and was regarded by the Ottoman authorities, the Greek guerilla groups, the contemporary press in Europe and even by Misirkov -as an exclusively Bulgarian organization.

=== Romanian propaganda ===
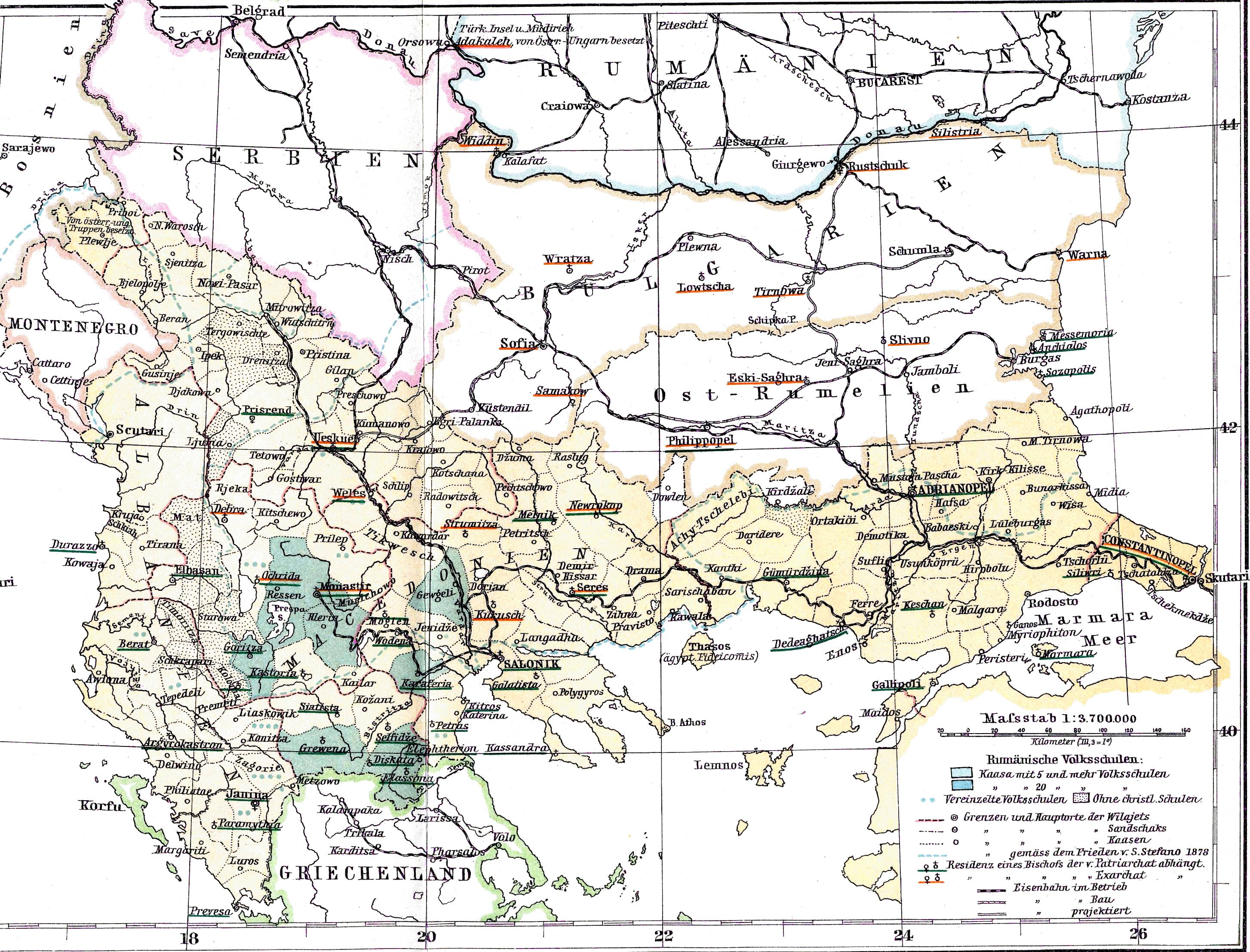
Map showing areas with Romanian schools for Aromanians and Megleno-Romanians in the Ottoman Empire (1886)

Romanian influence in the area made some success in Bitola, Kruševo, and in the Aromanian villages in the districts of Bitola and Ohrid. Most Aromanians regard and regarded themselves as a separate ethnic group, and Romanians view such nations as subgroups of a wider Romanian ethnicity. Some Aromanians do identify as part of the Romanian nation however. Currently, among anti-Romanian groups of Aromanians, particularly in Greece, these acts are referred to as "the Romanian propaganda".

=== Development of the name "Macedonian Slavs" ===
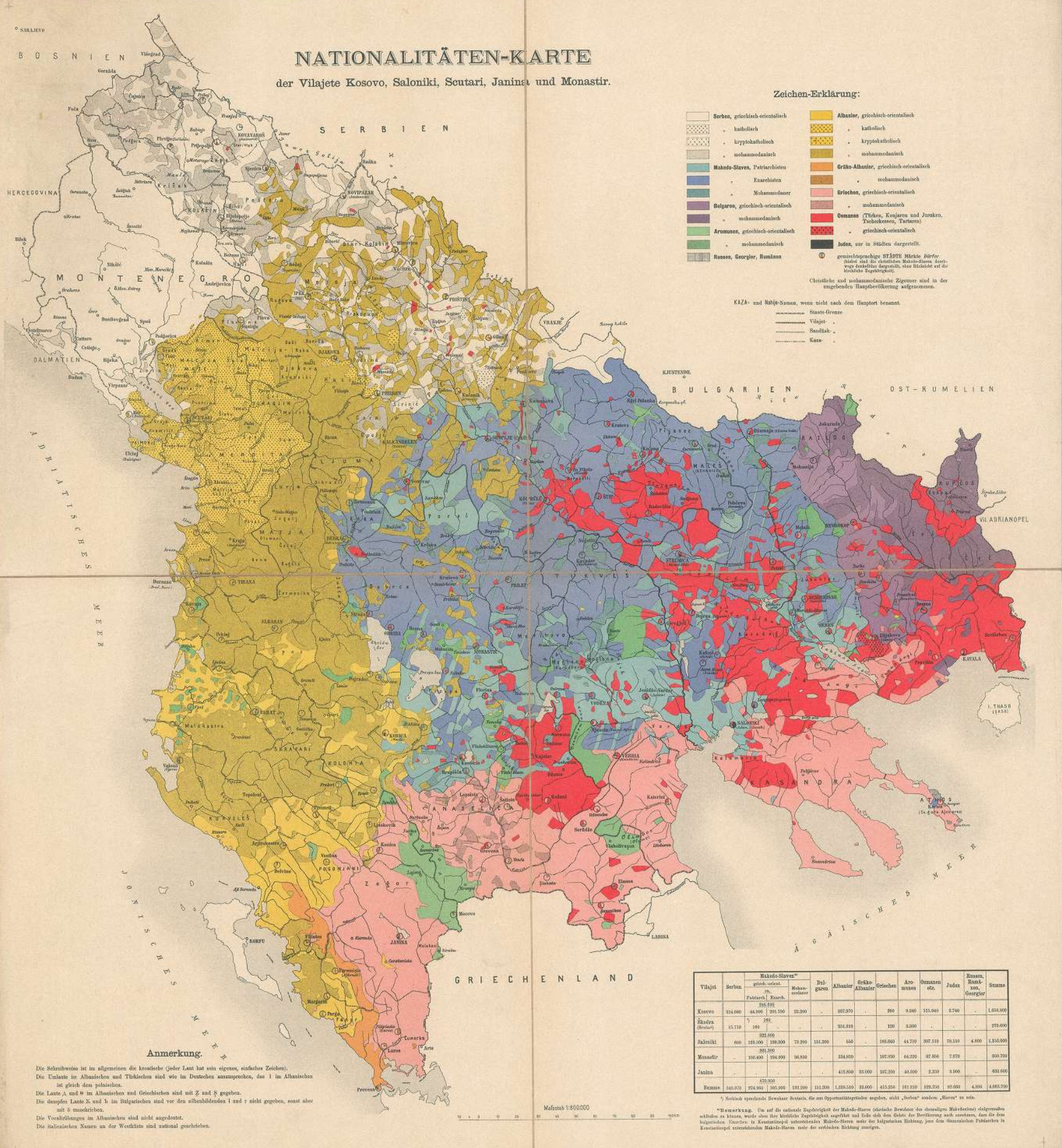
Ethnographic map of the vilayets of Kosovo, Saloniki, Scutari, Janina and Monastir, ca. 1900 (Institute and Museum of Military History)

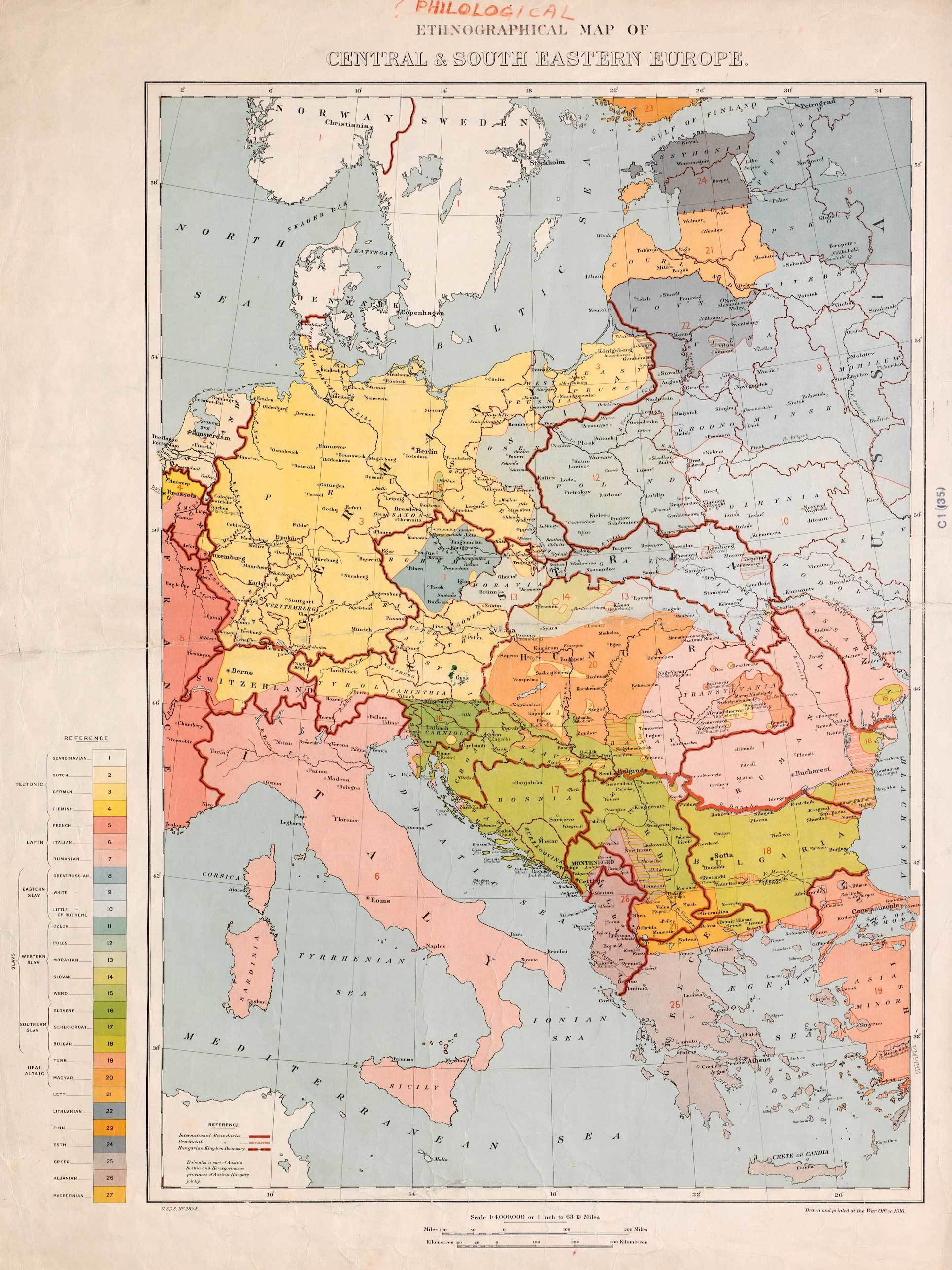
Ethnographical Map of Central and Southeastern Europe - War Office, 1916, London.

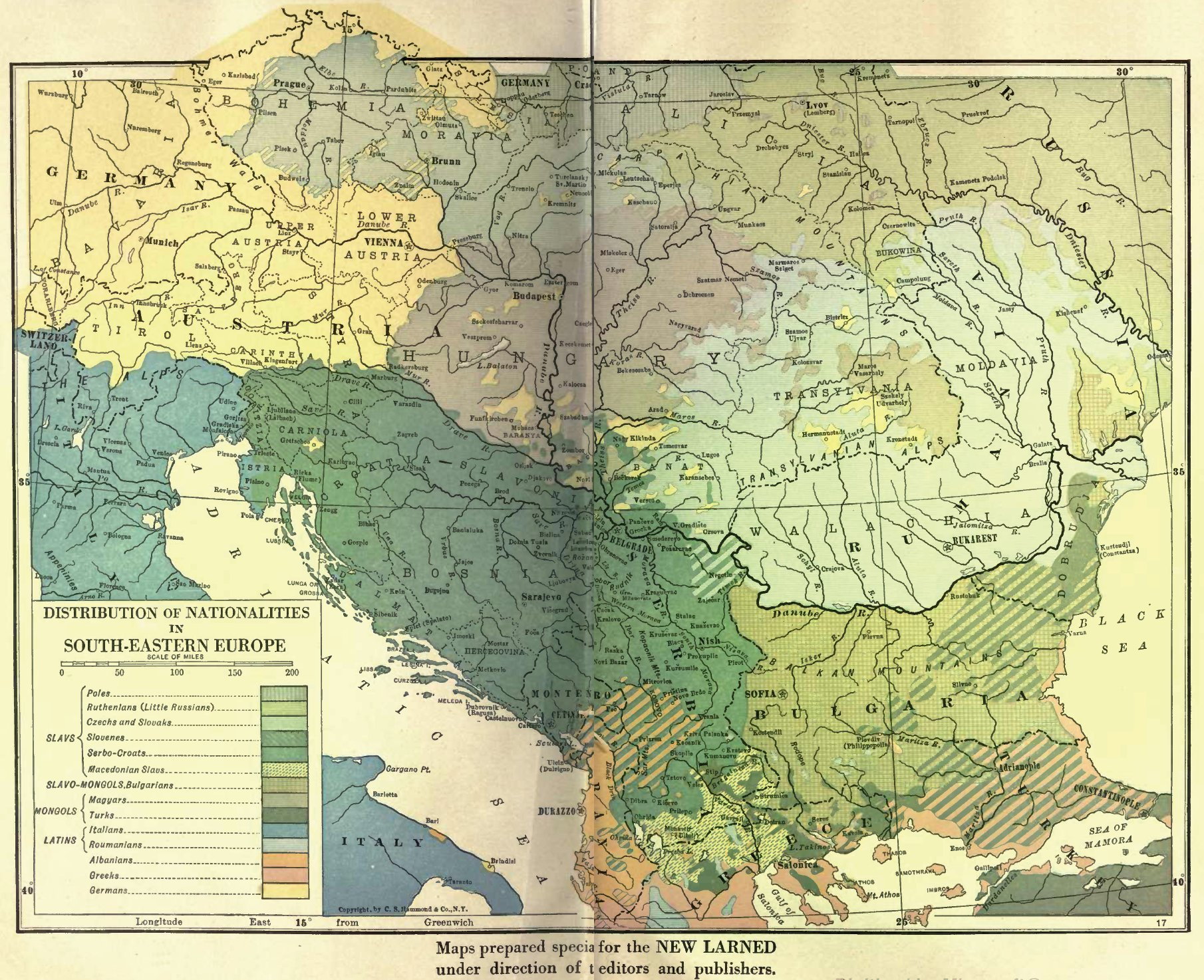
Ethnographic map of the Balkans, 1922.

The name "Macedonian Slavs" started to appear in publications at the end of the 1880s and the beginning of the 1890s. Though the successes of the Serbian propaganda effort had proved that the Slavic population of Macedonia was not only Bulgarian, they still failed to convince that this population was, in fact, Serbian. Rarely used until the end of the 19th century compared to 'Bulgarians', the term 'Macedonian Slavs' served more to conceal rather than define the national character of the population of Macedonia. Scholars resorted to it usually as a result of Serbian pressure or used it as a general term for the Slavs inhabiting Macedonia regardless of their ethnic affinities. The Serbian politician Stojan Novaković proposed in 1887 employing the Macedonistic ideas as they means to counteract the Bulgarian influence in Macedonia, thereby promoting Serbian interests in the region.

=== Absent national consciousness ===
What stood behind the difficulties to properly define the nationality of the Slavic population of Macedonia was the apparent levity with which this population regarded it. The existence of a separate Macedonian national consciousness prior to the 1940s is disputed. This confusion is illustrated by Robert Newman in 1935, who recounts discovering in a village in Vardar Macedonia (Note: "Vardar Macedonia" is the portion of the region of Macedonia currently occupied by North Macedonia.) two brothers, one who considered himself a Serb, and the other considered himself a Bulgarian. In another village he met a man who had been, "a Macedonian peasant all his life", but who had varyingly been called a Turk, a Serb and a Bulgarian. However anti-Serb and pro-Bulgarian feelings among the local population at this period prevailed.

=== Statistical data ===
==== Ottoman statistics ====
The basis of the Ottoman censuses was the millet system. People were assigned to ethnic categories according to religious affiliation. So all Sunni Muslims were categorised as Turks, all members of Greek Orthodox church as Greeks, while rest being divided between Bulgarian and Serb Orthodox churches. All censuses concluded that the province is of Christian majority, among whom the Bulgarians prevail.

1882 Ottoman census in Macedonia:

Religion	Population
1. Muslims	1,083,130
2. Bulgarian Orthodox	704,574
3. Greek Orthodox	534,396
4. Catholics	2,311
6. Jews and others	99,997
Total	2,476,141

1895 census:

Religion	Population
1. Muslims	1,137,315
2. Bulgarian Orthodox	692,742
3. Greek Orthodox	603,242
4. Catholics	3,315
6. Jews and others	68,432
Total	2,505,503

Special survey in 1904 of Hilmi Pasha of the three Macedonian vilayets of Selanik, Manastir and Kosovo (648 thousand followes of the Ecumenical Patriarchate and 557 thousand faithful of the Bulgarian Exarchate, but an additional 250 thousand of the former) had identified as Bulgarian speakers. The survey also extends to parts of the three vilayets which are not part of the region of Macedonia, i.e., Sandžak, Kosovo, parts of eastern Albania and Epirus.

Religion	Population
1. Muslims	1,508,507
2. Bulgarians	896,497
3. Greeks	307,000
4. Vlachs	99,000
5. Serbs	100,717
6. Jews and others	99,997
Total	2,911,700

Census 1906:

Muslims	1,145,849
Bulgarian Orthodox	626,715
Greek Orthodox	623,197
Others	59,564
Total	2,445,325

==== Rival statistical data ====
Name	Nationality	Greeks	Bulgarians	Serbs	Remarks
1. Spiridon Goptchevitch	Serbia	201,140	57,600	2,048,320	Refers to Macedonia and Old Serbia (Kosovo and Sanjak)
2. Cleanthes Nicolaides	Greece	454,700	656,300	576,600	---
3. Vasil Kantchoff	Bulgaria	225,152	1,184,036	700	---
4. M. Brancoff	Bulgaria	190,047	1,172,136	---	---

==== Encyclopædia Britannica ====
The 1911 edition of the Encyclopædia Britannica gave the following statistical estimates about the population of Macedonia:

- Slavs (described in the encyclopaedia as a "Slavonic population, the bulk of which is regarded by almost all independent sources as Bulgarians"): approximately 1,150,000, whereof, 1,000,000 Orthodox and 150,000 Muslims (called Pomaks)
- Turks: ca. 500,000 (Muslims)
- Greeks: ca. 250,000, whereof ca. 240,000 Orthodox and 14,000 Muslims
- Albanians: ca. 120,000, whereof 10,000 Orthodox and 110,000 Muslims
- Vlachs: ca. 90,000 Orthodox and 3,000 Muslims
- Jews: ca. 75,000
- Roma: ca. 50,000, whereof 35,000 Orthodox and 15,000 Muslims

In total 1,300,000 Christians (almost exclusively Orthodox), 800,000 Muslims, 75,000 Jews, a total population of ca. 2,200,000 for the whole of Macedonia.

It needs to be taken into account that part of the Slavic-speaking population in southern Macedonia regarded itself as ethnically Greek and a smaller percentage, mostly in northern Macedonia, as Serbian. All Muslims (except the Albanians) tended to view themselves and were viewed as Turks, irrespective of their mother tongue.

==== Statistical data of Greek Macedonia ====
According to a League of Nations report in 1912, Greek Macedonia's national makeup in 1913 was 42.6% Greek (513,000), 39.4% Muslim (475,000; including Vallahades), 9.9% Bulgarian (119,000) and 8.1% others (98,000). According to a Carnegie survey based on the ethnographic map of Southern Macedonia, representing the ethnic distribution on the eve of the 1912 Balkan war, published in 1913 by Mr. J. Ivanov, lecturer at the University of Sofia. The total numbers belonging to the various nationalities in a territory a little larger than the portion in the same region ceded to the Greeks by the Turks was 1,042,029 inhabitants, of whom 329,371 Bulgarians, 314,854 Turks, 236,755 Greeks, 68,206 Jews, 44,414 Wallachians, 25,302 Gypsies, 15,108 Albanians, 8,019 Miscellaneous.

According to a League of Nations report in 1926, the population consisted of 1,341,000 Greeks (88.8%), 77,000 Bulgarians (5.1%), 2,000 Turks and 91,000 others. The reports from 1912 and 1926 were based on data from the Greek geographer Alexandros A. Pallis. The British ethnographer Henry Wilkinson questioned these figures because nationality was defined solely by religion under the 1923 Greek–Turkish Convention. As a result, the table counted only Orthodox Greeks, Muslims, and members of the Bulgarian Exarchate, ignoring distinctions of language or ethnicity. Groups such as Albanians, Vlachs, Serbs, Pomaks, and Macedonian Slavs were not separately identified.

The official Greek census in 1928 recorded 81,844 Slavo-Macedonian speakers and 16,755 Bulgarian speakers. Modern historians, based on Greek archival sources, estimate that in 1928 there were 100,000–200,000 Slavic speakers.

== 20th and 21st centuries ==
The Balkan Wars (1912–1913) and World War I (1914–1918) left the region of Macedonia divided among Greece, Serbia, Bulgaria, and Albania and resulted in significant changes in its ethnic composition. 51% of the region's territory went to Greece, 38% to Serbia and 10% to Bulgaria. At least several hundred thousand left their homes, while the rest were also subjected to assimilation as all "liberators" after the Balkan War wanted to assimilate as many inhabitants as possible and colonize with settlers from their respective nation. The Greeks become the largest population in the region. The formerly leading Muslim and Bulgarian communities were reduced either by deportation (through population exchange) or by change of identity.

=== Greece ===
The Slavic population was viewed as Slavophone Greeks and prepared to be reeducated in Greek. Any vestiges of Bulgarian and Slavic Macedonia in Greece have been eliminated from the Balkan Wars, continuing to the present. The Greeks detested the Bulgarians (Slavs of Macedonia), considering them less than human "bears, practising systematic and inhumane methods of extermination and assimilation. The use of Bulgarian language had been prohibited, for which the persecution by the police peaked, while during the regime of Metaxas a vigorous assimilation campaign was launched. The civilians have been persecuted solely for identifying as Bulgarian with the slogans "If you want to be free, be Greek" "We shall cut your tongues to teach you to speak Greek." "become Greeks again, that being the condition of a peaceful life.""Are you Christians or Bulgarians?" "The voice of Alexander the Great calls to you from the tomb; do you not hear it? You sleep on and go on calling yourselves Bulgarians!" "Wast thou born at Sofia; there are no Bulgarians in Macedonia; the whole population is Greek." "He who goes to live in Bulgaria," was the reply to the protests, "is Bulgarian. No more Bulgarians in Greek Macedonia." The remaining Bulgarians threatened by use of force were made to become Greeks and to sign a declaration stating that they had been Greek since ancient times, but by the influence of komitadji they became Bulgarians only fifteen years ago, but nevertheless there was no real change in consciousness. In many villages people were put to prison and then were released after having proclaimed themselves Greeks. The Slavic dialect was considered as being of lowest intelligence with the assumptions that it "consists" only a thousand words of vocabulary. There are official records showing that children professing Bulgarian identity were also murdered for declining to profess Greek identity.

After the Treaty of Bucharest, some 51% of the modern region that was known as Macedonia was won by the Greek state (also known as Aegean or Greek Macedonia). This was the only part of Macedonia that Greece was directly interested in. Greeks regarded this land as the only true region of Macedonia as it geographically corresponded to ancient Macedon and contained an ethnically Greek majority of population. Bulgarian and other non-Greek schools in southern (Greek) Macedonia were closed and Bulgarian teachers and priests were deported as early as the First Balkan War simultaneous to deportation of Greeks from Bulgaria. The bulk of the Slavic population of southeastern Macedonia fled to Bulgaria during the Second Balkan War or was resettled there in the 1920s by virtue of a population exchange agreement. The Slavic minority in Greek Macedonia, who were referred to by the Greek authorities as "Slavomacedonians", "Slavophone Greeks" and "Bulgarisants", were subjected to a gradual assimilation by the Greek majority. Their numbers were reduced by a large-scale emigration to North America in the 1920s and the 1930s and to Eastern Europe and Yugoslavia following the Greek Civil War (1944–1949). At the same time a number of Macedonian Greeks from Monastiri (modern Bitola) entered Greece.

The 1923 Compulsory population exchange between Greece and Turkey led to a radical change in the ethnic composition of Greek Macedonia. Some 380,000 Turks and other Muslims left the region and were replaced by 538,253 Greeks from Asia Minor and Eastern Thrace, including Pontic Greeks from northeastern Anatolia and Caucasus Greeks from the South Caucasus.

Greece was attacked and occupied by Nazi-led Axis during World War II. By the beginning of 1941 the whole of Greece was under a tripartite German, Italian and Bulgarian occupation. The Bulgarians were permitted to occupy western Thrace and parts of Greek Macedonia, where they persecuted and committed massacres and other atrocities against the Greek population. The once thriving Jewish community of Thessaloniki was decimated by the Nazis, who deported 60,000 of the city's Jews to the German death camps in Germany and German-occupied Poland. Large Jewish populations in the Bulgarian occupied zone were deported by the Bulgarian army and had an equal death rate to the German zone.

The Bulgarian Army occupied the whole of Eastern Macedonia and Western Thrace, where it was greeted from a part of a Slav-speakers as liberators. Unlike Germany and Italy, Bulgaria officially annexed the occupied territories, which had long been a target of Bulgarian irridentism. A massive campaign of "Bulgarisation" was launched, which saw all Greek officials deported. This campaign was successful especially in Eastern and later in Central Macedonia, when Bulgarians entered the area in 1943. All Slav-speakers there were regarded as Bulgarians. However it was not so effective in German-occupied Western Macedonia. A ban was placed on the use of the Greek language, the names of towns and places changed to the forms traditional in Bulgarian.

With the help of Bulgarian officers several pro-Bulgarian and anti-Greek armed detachments (Ohrana) were organized in the Kastoria, Florina and Edessa districts of occupied Greek Macedonia in 1943. These were led by Bulgarian officers originally from Greek Macedonia; Andon Kalchev and Georgi Dimchev. Ohrana (meaning Defense) was an autonomist pro-Bulgarian organization fighting for unification with Greater Bulgaria. Uhrana was supported from IMRO leader Ivan Mihaylov too. It was apparent that Mihailov had broader plans which envisaged the creation of a Macedonian state under a German control. It was also anticipated that the IMRO volunteers would form the core of the armed forces of a future Independent Macedonia in addition to providing administration and education in the Florina, Kastoria and Edessa districts. In the summer of 1944, Ohrana constituted some 12,000 fighters and volunteers from Bulgaria charged with protection of the local population. During 1944, whole Slavophone villages were armed by the occupation authorities and developed into the most formidable enemy of the Greek People's Liberation Army (ELAS). Ohrana was dissolved in late 1944 after the German and Bulgarian withdrawal from Greece and Josip Broz Tito's Partisans movement hardly concealed its intention of expanding. After World War II, many former "Ohranists" were convicted of a military crimes as collaborationists. It was from this period, after Bulgaria's conversion to communism, that some Slav-speakers in Greece who had referred to themselves as "Bulgarians" increasingly began to identify as "Macedonians".

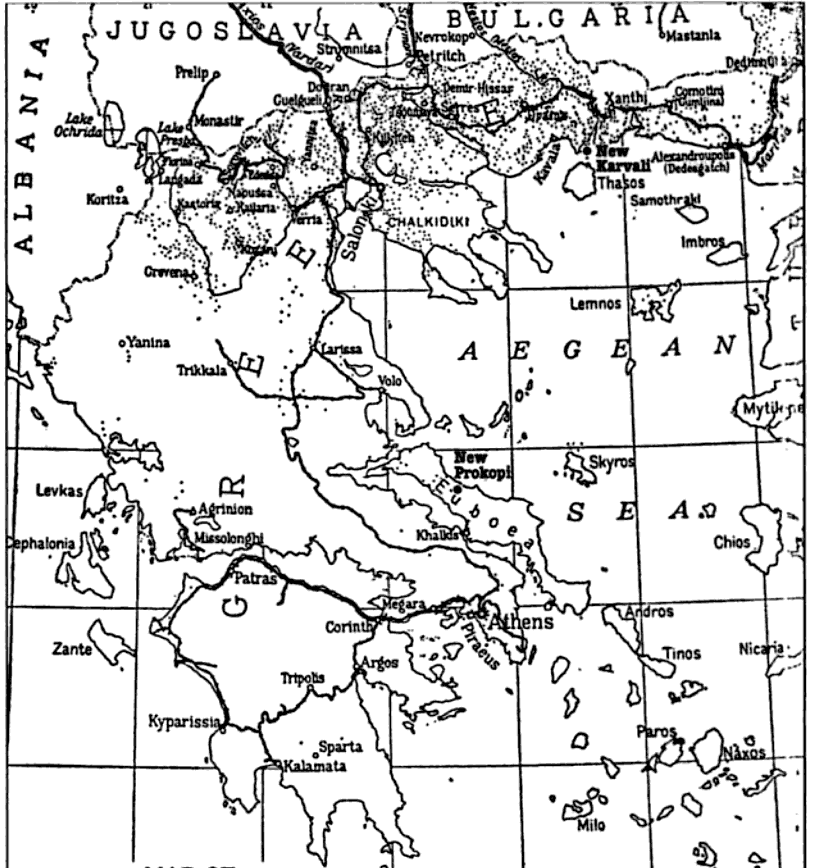
Map of Greek refugee settlements in Greece after the 1923 Greek-Turkish population exchange

Races of Eastern Europe by Alexander Gross, published by "Geographia" Ltd. in The Daily Telegraph, 1918.

Following the defeat of the Axis powers and the evacuation of the Nazi occupation forces many members of the Ohrana joined the SNOF where they could still pursue their goal of secession. The advance of the Red Army into Bulgaria in September 1944, the withdrawal of the German armed forces from Greece in October, meant that the Bulgarian Army had to withdraw from Greek Macedonia and Thrace. A large proportion of Bulgarians and Slavic speakers emigrated there. In 1944 the declarations of Bulgarian nationality were estimated by the Greek authorities, on the basis of monthly returns, to have reached 16,000 in the districts of German-occupied Greek Macedonia, but according to British sources, declarations of Bulgarian nationality throughout Western Macedonia reached 23,000.

By 1945 World War II had ended and Greece was in open civil war. It has been estimated that after the end of World War II over 40,000 people fled from Greece to Yugoslavia and Bulgaria. To an extent the collaboration of the peasants with the Germans, Italians, Bulgarians or the Greek People's Liberation Army (ELAS) was determined by the geopolitical position of each village. Depending upon whether their village was vulnerable to attack by the Greek communist guerrillas or the occupation forces, the peasants would opt to support the side in relation to which they were most vulnerable. In both cases, the attempt was to promise "freedom" (autonomy or independence) to the formerly persecuted Slavic minority as a means of gaining its support.

The National Liberation Front (NOF) was organized by the political and military groups of the Slavic minority in Greece, active from 1945 to 1949. The interbellum was the time when part of them came to the conclusion that they are Macedonians. Greek hostility to the Slavic minority produced tensions that rose to separatism. After the recognition in 1934 from the Comintern of the Macedonian ethnicity, the Greek communists have also recognized Macedonian national identity. Soon after the first "free territories" were created it was decided that ethnic Macedonian schools would open in the area controlled by the DSE. Books written in the ethnic Macedonian language were published, while ethnic Macedonians theatres and cultural organizations operated. Also within the NOF, a female organization, the Women's Antifascist Front (AFZH), and a youth organization, the National Liberation Front of Youth (ONOM), were formed.

The creation of the ethnic Macedonian cultural institutions in the Democratic Army of Greece (DSE)-held territory, newspapers and books published by NOF, public speeches and the schools opened, helped the consolidation of the ethnic Macedonian conscience and identity among the population. According to information announced by Paskal Mitrovski on the I plenum of NOF in August 1948 – about 85% of the Slavic-speaking population in Greek Macedonia has ethnic Macedonian self-identity. The language that was thought in the schools was the official language of the Socialist Republic of Macedonia. About 20,000 young ethnic Macedonians learned to read and write using that language, and learned their own history.

From 1946 until the end of the Civil War in 1949, the NOF was loyal to Greece and was fighting for minimal human rights within the borders of a Greek republic. But in order to mobilize more ethnic Macedonians into the DSE it was declared on 31 January 1949 at the 5th Meeting of the KKE Central Committee that when the DSE took power in Greece there would be an independent Macedonian state, united in its geographical borders. This new line of the KKE affected the mobilisation rate of ethnic Macedonians (which even earlier was considerably high), but did not manage, ultimately, to change the course of the war.

The government forces destroyed every village that was on their way, and expelled the civilian population. Leaving as a result of force or on their own accord (in order to escape oppression and retaliation), 50,000 people left Greece together with the retreating DSE forces. All of them were sent to Eastern Bloc countries. It was not until the 1970s that some of them were allowed to come to the Socialist Republic of Macedonia. In the 1980s, the Greek parliament adopted the law of national reconciliation which allowed DSE members "of Greek origin" to repatriate to Greece, where they were given land. Ethnic Macedonian DSE remembers remained excluded from the terms of this legislation.

On August 20, 2003, the Rainbow Party hosted a reception for the "child refugees", ethnic Macedonian children who fled their homes during the Greek Civil War who were permitted to enter Greece for a maximum of 20 days. Now elderly, this was the first time many of them saw their birthplaces and families in some 55 years. The reception included relatives of the refugees who are living in Greece and are members of Rainbow Party. However, many were refused entry by Greek border authorities because their passports listed the former names of their places of birth.

The present number of the "Slavophones" in Greece has been subject to much speculation with varying numbers. As Greece does not hold census based on self-determination and mother tongue, no official data is available. It should be noted, however, that the official Macedonian Slav party in Greece receives at an average only 1000 votes. For more information about the region and its population see Slavic speakers of Greek Macedonia.

=== Serbia and Yugoslavia ===
After the Balkan Wars (1912–1913) the Slavs in Vardar Macedonia were regarded as southern Serbs and the language they spoke a southern Serbian dialect. Serbian rule ensured that all ethnic Macedonian symbolism and identity were henceforth proscribed, and only standard Serbian was permitted to be spoken by the locals of Macedonia. In addition, Serbia did not refer to its southern land as Macedonia, a legacy which remains in place today among some Serbian nationalists (e.g. the Serbian Radical Party). Despite their attempts of forceful assimilation, Serb colonists in Vardar Macedonia numbered only 100,000 by 1942, so there was not that colonization and expulsion as in Greek Macedonia. Ethnic cleansing was unlikely in Serbia, Bulgarians were given to sign declaration for being Serbs since ancient times, those who refused to sign faced assimilation through terror, while Muslims faced similar discrimination. However, in 1913 Bulgarian revolts broke out in Tikvesh, Negotino, Kavadarci, Vartash, Ohrid, Debar and Struga, and more than 260 villages were burnt down. Serbian officials are documented to have buried alive three Bulgarian civilians from Pehčevo then. Bulgarians were forced to sign a petition "Declare yourself a Serb or die." 90,000 Serbian troops were deployed in Macedonia to keep down resistance from Serbianization, Serbian colonists were unsuccessfully encouraged to immigrate with the slogan "for the good of Serbs", but the Albanians and Turks to emigrate. In the next centuries, a sense of a distinct Macedonian nation emerged partly as a result of the resistance of IMRO, despite it was split into one Macedonist and one pro-Bulgarian wing. In 1918 the use of Bulgarian and Macedonian language was prohibited in Serbian Macedonia.

The Bulgarian, Greek and Romanian schools were closed, the Bulgarian priests and all non-Serbian teachers were expelled. Bulgarian surname endings '-ov/-ev' were replaced with the typically Serbian ending '-ich' and the population which considered itself Bulgarian was heavily persecuted. The policy of Serbianization in the 1920s and 1930s clashed with popular pro-Bulgarian sentiment stirred by IMRO detachments infiltrating from Bulgaria, whereas local communists favoured the path of self-determination suggested by the Yugoslav Communist Party in the 1924 May Manifesto.

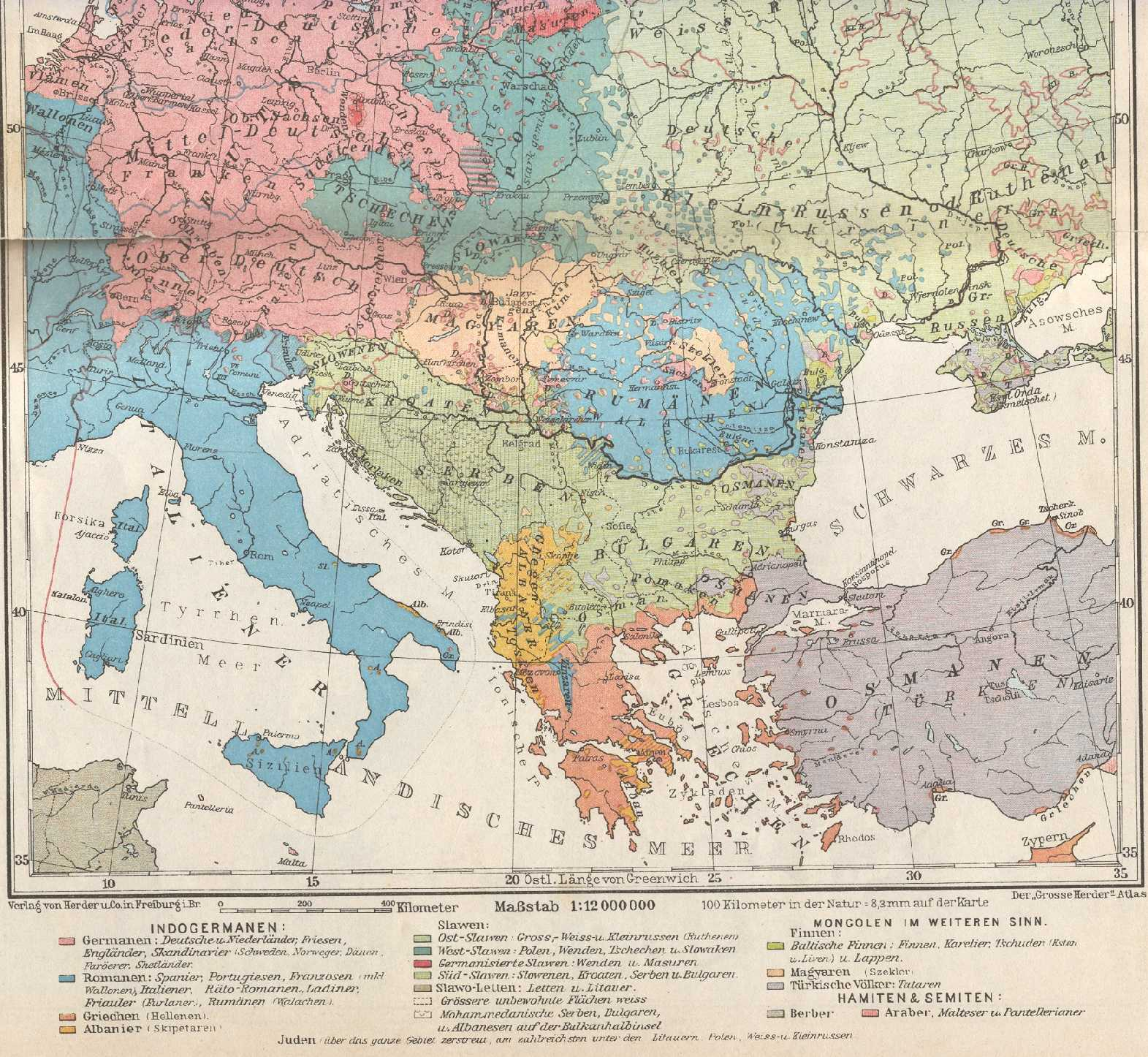
German ethnic map of Central Europe from 1932.

In 1925, D. J. Footman, the British vice consul at Skopje, addressed a lengthy report for the Foreign Office. He wrote that "the majority of the inhabitants of Southern Serbia are Orthodox Christian Macedonians, ethnologically more akin to the Bulgarians than to the Serbs." He acknowledged that the Macedonians were better disposed toward Bulgaria because, Bulgarian education system in Macedonia in the time of the Turks, was widespread and effective; and because Macedonians at the time perceived Bulgarian culture and prestige to be higher than those of its neighbors. Moreover, large numbers of Macedonians educated in Bulgarian schools had sought refuge in Bulgaria before and especially after the partitions of 1913. "There is therefore now a large Macedonian element in Bulgaria, continued represented in all Government Departments and occupying high positions in the army and in the civil service...." He characterized this element as "Serbophobe, [it] mostly desires the incorporation of Macedonia in Bulgaria, and generally supports the IMRO." However, he also pointed to the existence of the tendency to seek an independent Macedonia with Salonica as its capital. "This movement also had adherents among the Macedonian colony in Bulgaria."

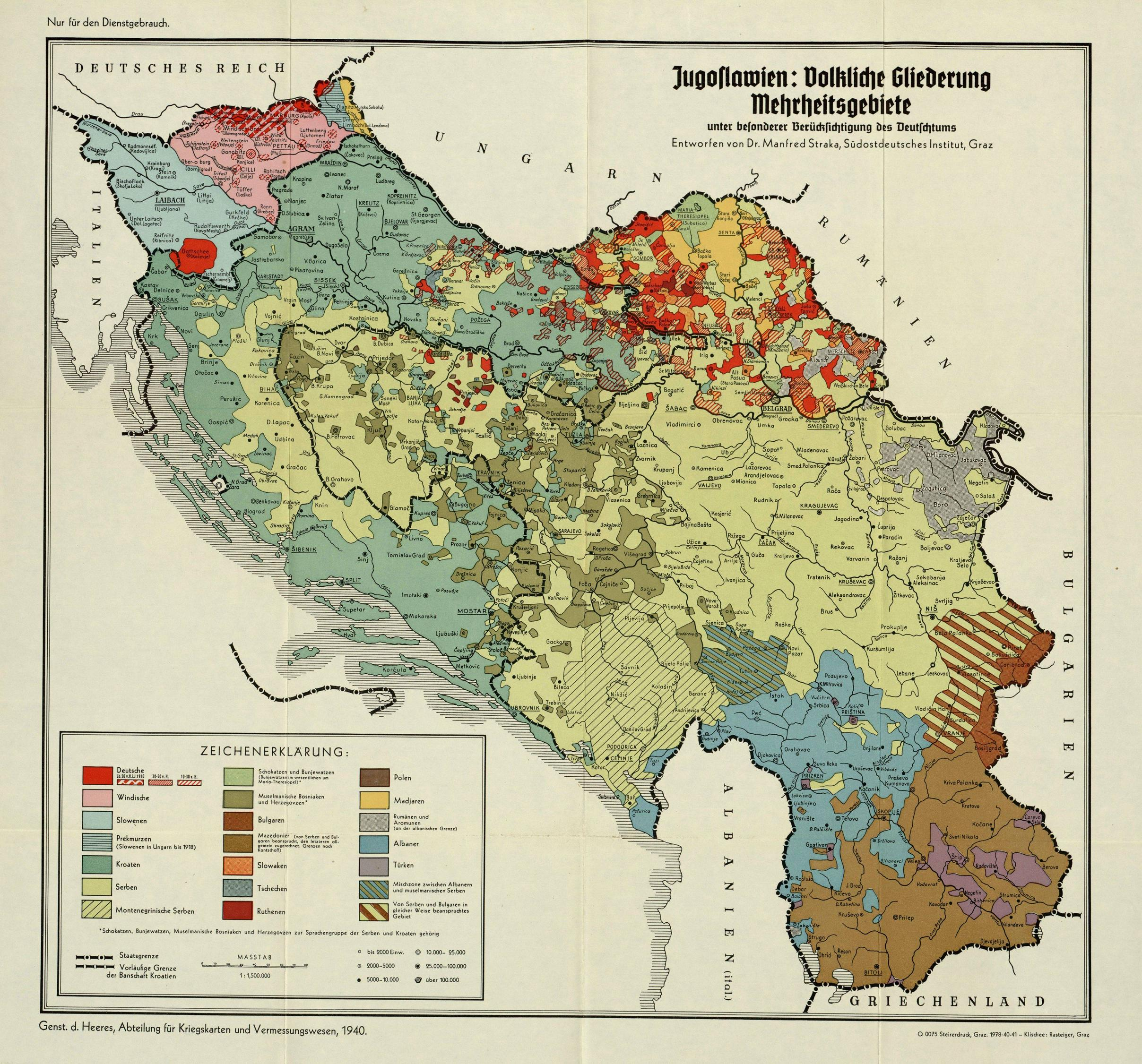
German ethnic map of Yugoslavia from 1940. Macedonians are depicted as a separate community, and described as claimed by Serbs and Bulgarians, but generally attributed to the last ones.

Bulgarian troops were welcomed as liberators in 1941 but mistakes of the Bulgarian administration made a growing number of people resent their presence by 1944. It must also to be noted that the Bulgarian army during the annexation of the region, was partially recruited from the local population, which formed as much as 40%-60% of the soldiers in certain battalions. Some recent data has announced that even the National Liberation War of Macedonia has resembled ethno-political motivated civil war. After the war the region received the status of a constituent republic within Yugoslavia and in 1945 a separate, Macedonian language was codified. The population was declared Macedonian, a nationality different from both Serbs and Bulgarians. The decision was politically motivated and aimed at weakening the position of Serbia within Yugoslavia and of Bulgaria with regard to Yugoslavia. Surnames were again changed to include the ending '-ski', which was to emphasise the unique nature of the ethnic Macedonian population.

From the start of the new Socialist Federal Republic of Yugoslavia (SFRY), accusations surfaced that new authorities in Macedonia were involved in retribution against people who did not support the formation of the new Yugoslav Macedonian republic. The numbers of dead "counter-revolutionaries" due to organized killings, however is unclear. Besides, many people went throughout the Labor camp of Goli Otok in the middle 1940s. This chapter of the partisan's history was a taboo subject for conversation in the SFRY until the late 1980s, and as a result, decades of official silence created a reaction in the form of numerous data manipulations for nationalist communist propaganda purposes. At the times of Croatian ruling-class of Yugoslavia, Vardar Banovina Province was turned into autonomous Macedonia with a majority of the population declaring on census as ethnic Macedonians, and a Macedonian language as the official, recognized as distinct from Serbo-Croatian. The capital was placed in a Torlakian-speaking region. Persecution of Bulgarian identity by the state continued, along with propaganda.

After the creation of Macedonian Republic the Presidium of ASNOM which was the highest political organ in Macedonia made several statements and actions that were de facto boycotting the decisions of AVNOJ. Instead of obeying the order of Tito's General Headquarters to send the main forces of the NOV of Macedonia to participate in the fighting in the Srem area for the final liberation of Yugoslavia, the cadre close to President Metodija Andonov – Cento gave serious thoughts whether it is better to order the preparation for an advance of the 100.000 armed men under his command toward northern Greece in order to "unify the Macedonian people" into one country. Officers loyal to Chento's ideas made a mutiny in the garrison stationed on Skopje's fortress, but the mutiny was suppressed by armed intervention. A dozen officers were shot on place, others sentenced to life imprisonment. Also Chento and his close associates were trying to minimize the ties with Yugoslavia as far as possible and were constantly mentioning the unification of the Macedonian people into one state, which was against the decisions of AVNOJ. Chento was even talking about the possibility to create an independent Macedonia backed by the US. The Yugoslav secret police made a decisive action and managed to arrest Metodija Andonov - Chento and his closest men and prevent his policies. Chento's place was taken by Lazar Kolishevski, who started fully implementing the pro-Yugoslav line.

Later the authorities organised frequent purges and trials of Macedonian people charged with autonomist deviation. Many of the former IMRO (United) government officials, were purged from their positions then isolated, arrested, imprisoned or executed on various (in many cases fabricated) charges including: pro-Bulgarian leanings, demands for greater or complete independence of Yugoslav Macedonia, forming of conspirative political groups or organisations, demands for greater democracy, etc. People as Panko Brashnarov, Pavel Shatev, Dimitar Vlahov and Venko Markovski were quickly ousted from the new government, and some of them assassinated. On the other hand, former IMRO-members, followers of Ivan Mihailov, were also persecuted by the Belgrade-controlled authorities on accusations of collaboration with the Bulgarian occupation. Metodi Shatorov's supporters in Vardar Macedonia, called Sharlisti, were systematically exterminated by the Yugoslav Communist Party (YCP) in the autumn of 1944, and repressed for their anti-Yugoslav and pro-Bulgarian political positions.

The encouragement and evolution of the culture of the Republic of Macedonia has had a far greater and more permanent impact on Macedonian nationalism than has any other aspect of Yugoslav policy. While development of national music, films and the graphic arts has been encouraged in the Republic of Macedonia, the greatest cultural effect has come from the codification of the Macedonian language and literature, the new Macedonian national interpretation of history and the establishment of a Macedonian Orthodox Church in 1967 by Central Committee of the Communist Party of Macedonia.

=== Bulgaria ===
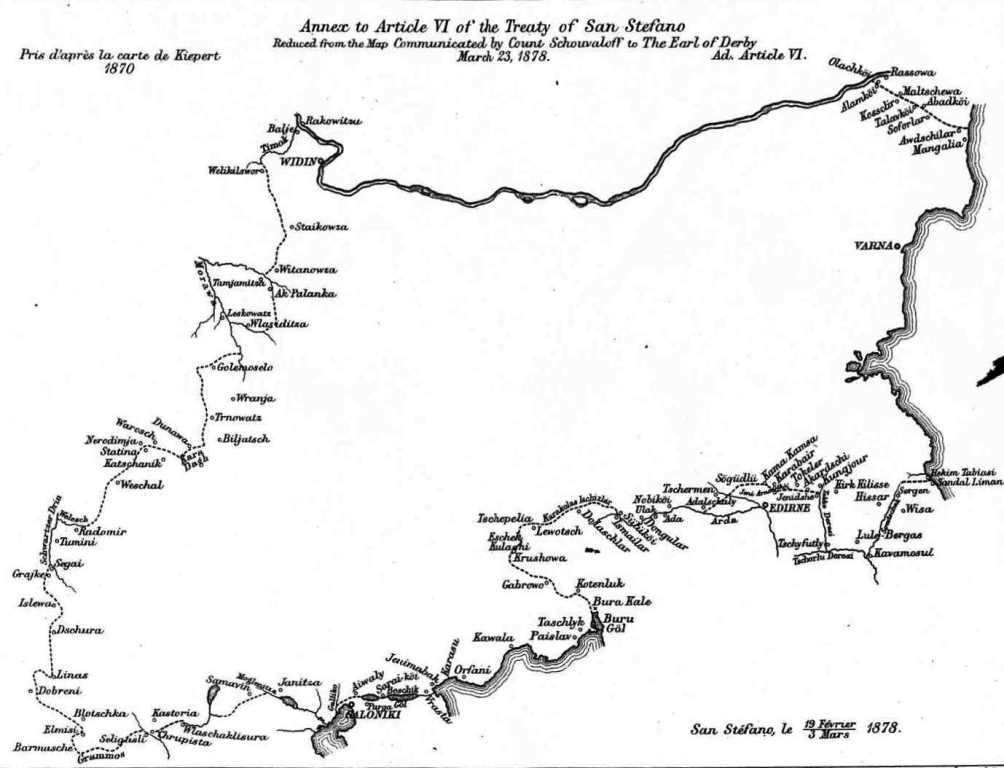
Annex to the 1878 Treaty of San Stephano, showing the boundaries of Bulgaria.

The Bulgarian population in Pirin Macedonia remained Bulgarian after 1913. The "Macedonian question" became especially prominent after the Balkan Wars in 1912–1913, followed from the withdraw of the Ottoman Empire and the subsequent division of the region of Macedonia between Greece, Bulgaria and Serbia. The Slav – speakers in Macedonia tended to be Christian peasants, but the majority of them were under the influence of the Bulgarian Exarchate and its education system, thus considered themselves as Bulgarians. Moreover, Bulgarians in Bulgaria believed that most of the population of Macedonia was Bulgarian. Before the Balkan Wars the regional Macedonian dialects were treated as Bulgarian and the Exarchate school system taught the locals in Bulgarian. Following the Balkan wars the Bulgarian Exarchate activity in most of the region was discontinued. After World War I, the territory of the present-day North Macedonia came under the direct rule of the Kingdom of Yugoslavia and was sometimes termed "Southern Serbia". Together with a portion of today's Serbia, it belonged officially to the newly formed Vardar Banovina. An intense program of Serbianization was implemented during the 1920s and 1930s when Belgrade enforced a Serbian cultural assimilation process on the region. Between the two world wars in Vardar Banovina, the regional Macedonian dialects were declared as Serbian and the Serbian language was introduced in the schools and administration as official language. There was implemented a governmental policy of assassinations and assimilation. The Serbian administration in Vardar Banovina felt insecure and that provoked its brutal reprisals on the local peasant population. Greece, like all other Balkan states, adopted restrictive policies towards its minorities, namely towards its Slavic population in its northern regions, due to its experiences with Bulgaria's wars, including the Second Balkan War, and the Bulgarian inclination of sections of its Slavic minority.

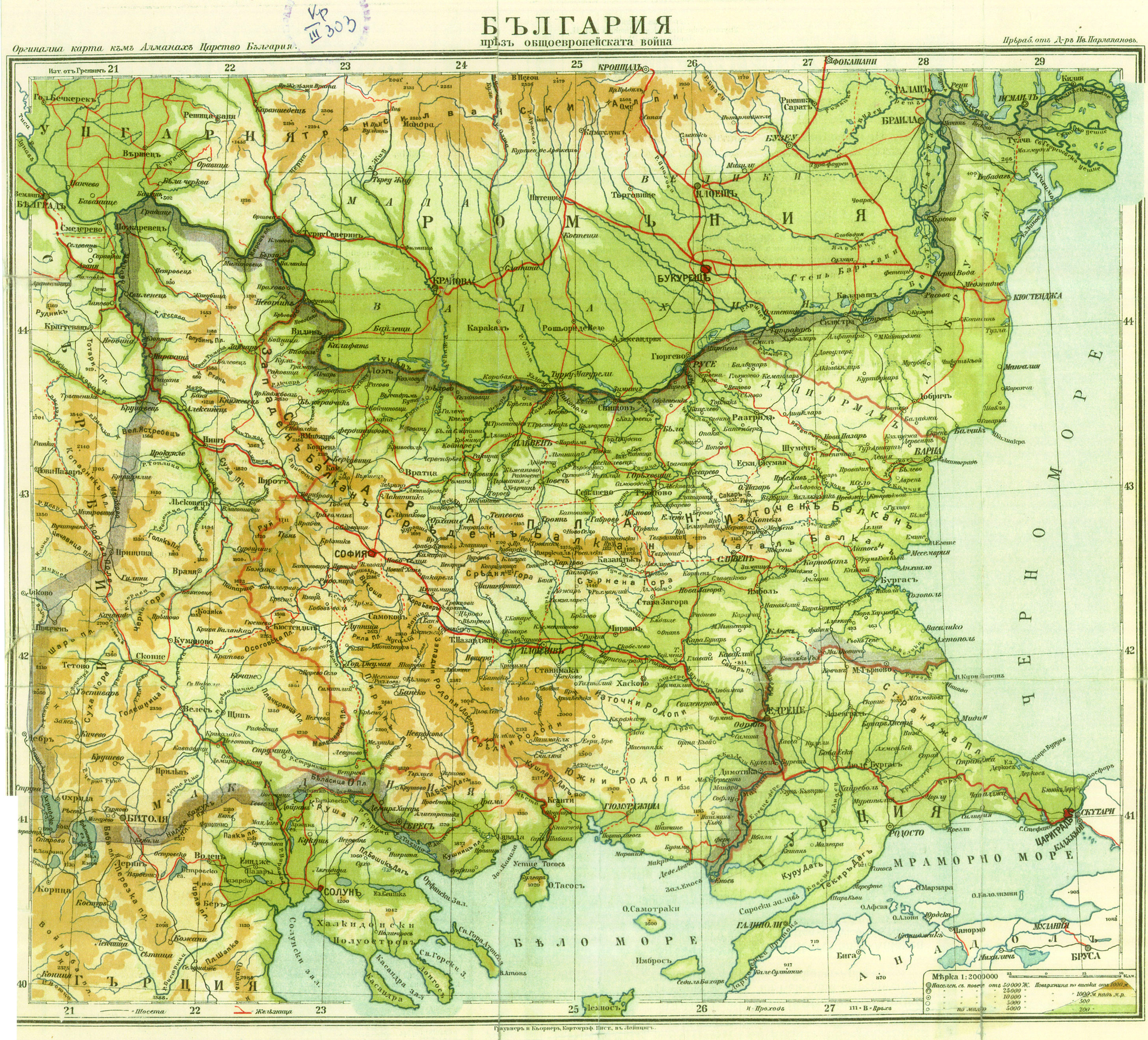
Bulgarian campaigns during World War I.

The movement of the Bulgarian army in Yugoslavia started on April 19, and in Greece on April 20. The prominent force which occupied most of Vardar Macedonia, was the Bulgarian 5th Army. The 6th and 7th Infantry Divisions were active in invading the Vardar Banovina between 19 and 24 April 1941. The Bulgarian troops were mainly present in the western part of Vardar Macedonia, close to the Italian occupational zone, because of some border clashes with Italians, who implemented Albanian interests and terrorized the local peasants. So the most of Vardar Banovina, (including Vardar Macedonia), was annexed by Bulgaria and along with various other regions became Greater Bulgaria. The westernmost parts of Vardar Macedonia was occupied by the fascist Kingdom of Italy. As the Bulgarian Army entered Vardar Macedonia on 19 April 1941, it was greeted by the local population as liberators as it meant the end of Serbian rule. Former IMRO and IMRO (United) members were active in organizing Bulgarian Action Committees charged with taking over the local authorities. Bulgarian Action Committees propagated a proclamation to the Bulgarians in North Macedonia on occasion of the invasion of the Bulgarian Army in the Vardar Banovina. As regards the Serbian colonists, the members of the campaign committees were adamant—they had to be deported as soon as possible and their properties to be returned to the locals. With the arrival of the Bulgarian army mass expulsion of Serbs from the area of the Vardar Macedonia took place. First, the city dwellers were deported in 1941, then all of the suspected pro-Serbs. Metodi Shatarov-Šarlo, who was a local leader of the Yugoslav Communist Party, also refused to define the Bulgarian forces as occupiers (contrary to instructions from Belgrade) and called for the incorporation of the local Macedonian Communist organizations within the Bulgarian Communist Party (BCP). The Macedonian Regional Committee refused to remain in contact with Communist Party of Yugoslavia (CPY) and linked up with BCP as soon as the invasion of Yugoslavia started. The CPY formally decided to launch an armed uprising on 4 July 1941 but Šarlo refused to distribute the proclamation of calling for military actions against Bulgarians. More than 12,000 Yugoslav Macedonian prisoners of war (POWs) who had been conscripted into the Yugoslav army were released by a German, Italian and Hungarian Armies. The Slav-speakers in the part of Greek Macedonia occupied by the Bulgarian Army also greeted it as liberation.

Before the German invasion in the Soviet Union, there had not been any resistance in Vardar Banovina. At the start of World War II, the Comintern supported a policy of non-intervention, arguing that the war was an imperialist war between various national ruling classes, but when the Soviet Union itself was invaded on 22 June 1941, the Comintern changed its position. The German attack on the Soviet Union sparked the rage of the Communists in Bulgaria. The same day the BCP spread a brochure among the people urging "To hinder by all means the usage of Bulgarian land and soldiers for the criminal purposes of German fascism". Two days later, on 24 June, the BCP called for an armed resistance against the Wehrmacht and the Bogdan Filov government. After that, and when already months ago Yugoslavia was annexed by Axis Powers, Macedonian Communist partisans, which included Macedonians, Aromanians, Serbs, Albanians, Jews and Bulgarians had begun organizing their resistance. The First Skopje Partisan Detachment was founded and had been attacked Axis soldiers on 8 September 1941 in Bogomila, near Skopje. The revolt on 11 October 1941 by the Prilep Partisan Detachment is considered to be the symbolic beginning of the resistance. Armed insurgents from the Prilep Partisan Detachment attacked Axis occupied zones in the city of Prilep, notably a police station, killing one Bulgarian policeman of local origin, which led to attacks in Kruševo and to the creation of small rebel detachments in other regions of North Macedonia. Partisan detachments were formed also in Greek Macedonia and today's Bulgarian Macedonia under the leadership of Communist Party of Greece and Bulgarian Communist Party.

In April 1942 a map titled "The Danube area" was published in Germany, where the so-called "new annexed territories" of Bulgaria in Vardar and Greek Macedonia and Western Thrace were described as "territories under temporary Bulgarian administration". This was a failure for Sofia's official propaganda, which claimed to have completed the National unification of the Bulgarians and showed the internal contradiction among Italy, Bulgaria and Germany. With the ongoing war, new anti-fascist partisan units were constantly formed and in 1942 a total of nine small partisan detachments were active in Vardar Macedonia and had maintained control of mountainous territories around Prilep, Skopje, Kruševo and Veles. The clash between the Yugoslav and Bulgarian Communists about possession over North Macedonia was not ended. While the Bulgarian Communists avoided organizing mass armed uprising against the Bulgarian authorities, the Yugoslav Communists insisted that no liberation could be achieved without an armed revolt. With the help of the Comintern and of Joseph Stalin himself a decision was taken and the Macedonian Communists were attached to CPY. Because of the unwillingness of local Communists for earnest struggle against the Bulgarian Army, the Supreme Staff of CPY took measurements for strengthening of the campaign.

Otherwise the policy of minimal resistance changed towards 1943 with the arrival of the Montenegrin Svetozar Vukmanović-Tempo, who began to organize an energetic struggle against the Bulgarian occupants. Tempo served on the Supreme Staff of CPY and became Josip Broz Tito's personal representative in the Vardar Banovina.

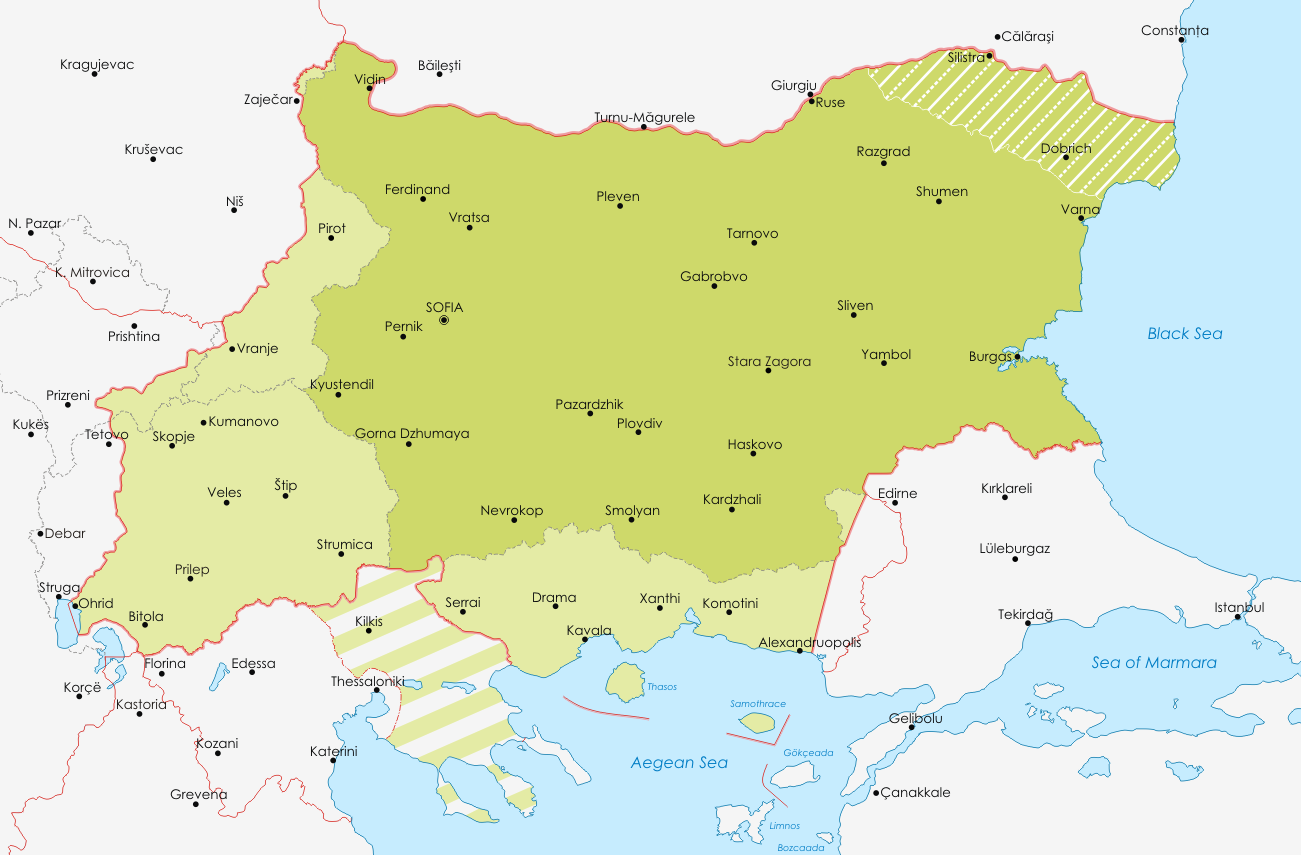
Bulgaria during World War II.

Meanwhile, the Bulgarian government was responsible for the round-up and deportation of over 7,000 Jews in Skopje and Bitola. It refused to deport the Jews from Bulgarian proper but later under German pressure those Jews from the new annexed territories, without a Bulgarian citizenship were deported, as these from Vardar Macedonia and Western Thrace. The Bulgarian authorities created a special Gendarmerie forces which received almost unlimited power to pursue the Communist partisans on the whole territory of the kingdom. The gendarmes became notorious for carrying out atrocities against captured partisans and their supporters. Harsh rule by the occupying forces and a number of Allied victories indicated that the Axis might lose the war and that encouraged more Macedonians to support the communist Partisan resistance movement of Josip Broz Tito.

Many former IMRO members assisted the Bulgarian authorities in fighting Tempo's partisans. With the help of Bulgarian government and former IMRO members, several pro-Bulgarian and anti-Greek detachments – Uhrana were organized in occupied Greek Macedonia in 1943. These were led by Bulgarian officers originally from Greek Macedonia and served for protection of the local population in the zone under German and Italian control. After the capitulation of Fascist Italy in September 1943, the Italian zone in Macedonia was taken over by the Germans. Uhrana was supported from Ivan Mihailov. It was apparent that Mihailov had broader plans which envisaged the creation of a Macedonian state under a German control. He was follower of the idea about a United Macedonian state with prevailing Bulgarian element. It was also anticipated that the IMRO volunteers would form the core of the armed forces of a future Independent Macedonia in addition to providing administration and education in the Florina, Kastoria and Edessa districts.

Then in the resistance movement in Vardar Macedonia were clearly visible two political tendencies. The first one was represented by Tempo and the newly established Macedonian Communist Party, gave priority to battling against any form of manifest or latent pro-Bulgarian sentiment and to bringing the region into the new projected Communist Yugoslav Federation. Veterans of the pro-Bulgarian IMRO and IMRO (United) who had accepted the solution of the Macedonian question as an ethnic preference, now regarded the main objective as being the unification of Macedonia into a single state, whose postwar future was to involve not necessarily inclusion in a Yugoslav federation. They foresaw in it a new form of Serbian dominance over North Macedonia, and prefer rather membership of a Balkan federation or else independence. These two tendencies would have struck in the next few years. In Spring of 1944 the Macedonian National Liberation Army launched an operation called "The Spring Offensive" engaging German and Bulgarian Armies, which had over 60,000 military and administrative personnel in the area. In Strumica, approximately 3,800 fighters took part in the formation of military movements of the region; The 4th, 14th and 20th Macedonian Action Brigades, the Strumica Partisan Detachment and the 50th and 51st Macedonian Divisions were formed. Since the formation of an army in 1943, Macedonian Communist partisans were aspiring to create an autonomous government.

On 2 August 1944, on the 41st anniversary of the Ilinden-Preobrazhenie Uprising, the first session of the newly created Anti-Fascist Assembly of the National Liberation of Macedonia (ASNOM) was held at the St. Prohor Pčinjski monastery. А manifesto was written outlining the future plans of ASNOM for an independent Macedonian state and for creation of the Macedonian language as the official language of the Macedonian state. However, a decision was later reached that Vardar Macedonia will become a part of new Communist Yugoslavia. In the summer of 1944, Ohrana constituted some 12,000 fighters and volunteers from Bulgaria. Whole Slavophone villages were armed and developed into the most formidable enemy of the Greek People's Liberation Army (ELAS). At this time Ivan Mihailov arrived in German-occupied Skopje, where the Germans hoped that he could form an Independent State of Macedonia with their support on the base of IMRO and Ohrana. Seeing that the war is lost to Germany and to avoid further bloodshed, he refused.

At this time the new Bulgarian government of Ivan Bagryanov began secret negotiations with the Allies aiming to find separate peace with repudiating any alliance with Nazi Germany and declaring neutrality, ending all anti-Jewish laws and ordering the withdrawal of the Bulgarian troops from Macedonia. Through its Macedonia-born minister of Internal Affairs Alexander Stanishev, the government tried to negotiate with the Macedonian partisans promising that after Bulgarian army withdrawal from Vardar Macedonia its arms would be given up to the partisans. It would be possible by condition that partisans guaranteed the establishment of pro-Bulgarian Macedonian state without the frame of future Yugoslavia. The negotiations failed and on 9 September 1944 the Fatherland Front in Sofia made a coup d'état and deposed the government. After the declaration of war by Bulgaria on Nazi Germany, the withdrawing Bulgarian troops in Macedonia surrounded by German forces, fought their way back to the old borders of Bulgaria. Under the leadership of a new Bulgarian pro-Communist government, three Bulgarian armies, 455,000 strong in total, entered occupied Yugoslavia in late September 1944 and moved from Sofia to Niš and Skopje with the strategic task of blocking the German forces withdrawing from Greece. They operated here in interaction with local partisans. Southern and eastern Serbia and most of Vardar Macedonia were liberated within an end of November. Toward the end of November and during early December, the main Bulgarian forces were assembled in liberated Serbia prior to their return home. The 135,000-strong Bulgarian First Army continued to Hungary, aided by Yugoslav Partisans.

However, the Bulgarian army during the annexation of the region was partially recruited from the local population, which formed as much as 40% of the soldiers in certain battalions. Some official comments of deputies in the Macedonian parliament and of former Premier, Ljubčo Georgievski after 1991 announced the "struggle was civil, but not a liberation war". According to official sources the number of Macedonian communist partisan's victims against the Bulgarian army during World War II was 539 men. Bulgarian historian and director of the Bulgarian National Historical Museum Dr. Bozhidar Dimitrov, in his 2003 book The Ten Lies of Macedonism, has also questioned the extent of resistance of the local population of Vardar Macedonia against the Bulgarian forces and describes the clash as political.

After the end of World War II, the creation of People's Republic of Macedonia and of a new Macedonian language, it started a process of ethnogenesis and distinct national Macedonian identity was formed. The new Yugoslav authorities began a policy of removing of any Bulgarian influence, making Macedonia connecting link for the establishment of new Balkan Federation and creating a distinct Slavic consciousness that would inspire identification with Yugoslavia. After World War II the ruling Bulgarian Communists declared the population in Bulgarian Macedonia as ethnic Macedonian and teachers were brought in from Yugoslavia to teach the locals in the new Macedonian language. The organizations of the IMRO in Bulgaria were completely destroyed. Former IMRO members were hunted by the Communist Militsiya and many of them imprisoned, repressed, exiled or killed. Also internments of disagreeing with this political activities people at the Belene labor camp were organized. Tito and Georgi Dimitrov worked about the project to merge the two Balkan countries Bulgaria and Yugoslavia into a Balkan Federative Republic according to the projects of Balkan Communist Federation. This led to the 1947 cooperation and signing of Bled Agreement. It foresaw unification between Vardar Macedonia and Pirin Macedonia and return of Western Outlands to Bulgaria. They also supported the Greek Communists and especially Slavic-Macedonian National Liberation Front in the Greek Civil War with the idea of unification of Greek Macedonia and Western Thrace to the new state under Communist rule. According this project the bourgeoisie of the ruling nations in the three imperialist states among which Macedonia was partitioned, tried to camouflage its national oppression, denying the national features of the Macedonian people and the existence of the Macedonian nation. The policies resulting from the agreement were reversed after the Tito–Stalin split in June 1948, when Bulgaria, being subordinated to the interests of the Soviet Union took a stance against Yugoslavia. This policy for projection and recognition of regional countries and nations since the 1930s as for example Macedonia, had been the norm in Comintern policies, displaying Soviet resentment of the nation-state in Eastern Europe and of the consequences of Paris Peace Conference. With the 1943 dissolution of Comintern and the subsequent advent of the Cominform in 1948 came Joseph Stalin's dismissal of the previous ideology, and adaptation to the conditions created for Soviet hegemony during the Cold War. The Dimitrov's sudden death in July 1949 was followed by a "Titoists" witchhunt in Bulgaria.

After Greek Communists lost the Greek Civil War, many Slav speakers were expelled from Greece. Although the People's Republic of Bulgaria originally accepted very few refugees, government policy changed and the Bulgarian government actively sought out refugees from Greek Macedonia. It is estimated that approximately 2,500 children were sent to Bulgaria and 3,000 partisans fled there in the closing period of the war. There was a larger flow into Bulgaria of refugees as the Bulgarian Army pulled out of the Drama-Serres region in 1944. A large proportion of Slavic speakers emigrated there. The "Slavic Committee" in Sofia (Bulgarian: Славянски Комитет) helped to attract refugees that had settled in other parts of the Eastern Bloc. According to a political report in 1962 the number of political emigrants from Greece numbered at 6,529. The policy of communist Bulgaria towards the refugees from Greece was, at least initially, not discriminative with regard to their ethnic origin: Greek- and Slav-speakers were both categorized as Greek political emigrants and received equal treatment by state authorities. However, the end of the 1950s was marked by adecisive turn in the "Macedonistic" policy of Bulgaria, "which did not recognize anymore the existence of a Macedonian ethnicity different from the Bulgarian one". As a result, the trend to a discriminative policy, the refugees from Greece – more targeted at the Slav-speakers and less to "ethnic Greeks" – was given a certain proselytizing aspect. Eventually many of these migrants were assimilated into Bulgarian society.

At the end of the 1950s the Communist Party repealed its previous decision and adopted a position denying the existence of a "Macedonian" nation. The inconsistent Bulgarian policy has thrown most independent observers ever since into a state of confusion as to the real origin of the population in Bulgarian Macedonia. In 1960, the Bulgarian Communist Party voted a special resolution explained "with the fact that almost all of the Macedonians have a clear Bulgarian national consciousness and consider Bulgaria their homeland. As result international relations upon the Sofia–Belgrade line deteriorated, and in fact were broken. This led to a final victory of the anti-Bulgarian and pro-Yugoslav oriented Macedonian political circles and signified a definite decline of the very notion of a south Slavonic federation. In Macedonia the Bulgarophobia increased almost to the level of state ideology.

Bulgaria usually kept the right to declare ethnicity at census, but Bulgarian identity was minimized in the censuses of Yugoslavia and Blagoevgrad Province of Bulgaria. In the 1945 census, the population was listed as ethnic Macedonians against their will by the communist government in accordance with an agreement with Yugoslavia. In the 1956 census, however, the Bulgarian authorities pressured the population to declare themselves as Bulgarians. Despite these pressures, 178,862 people in Blagoevgrad Oblast still identified as Macedonians.

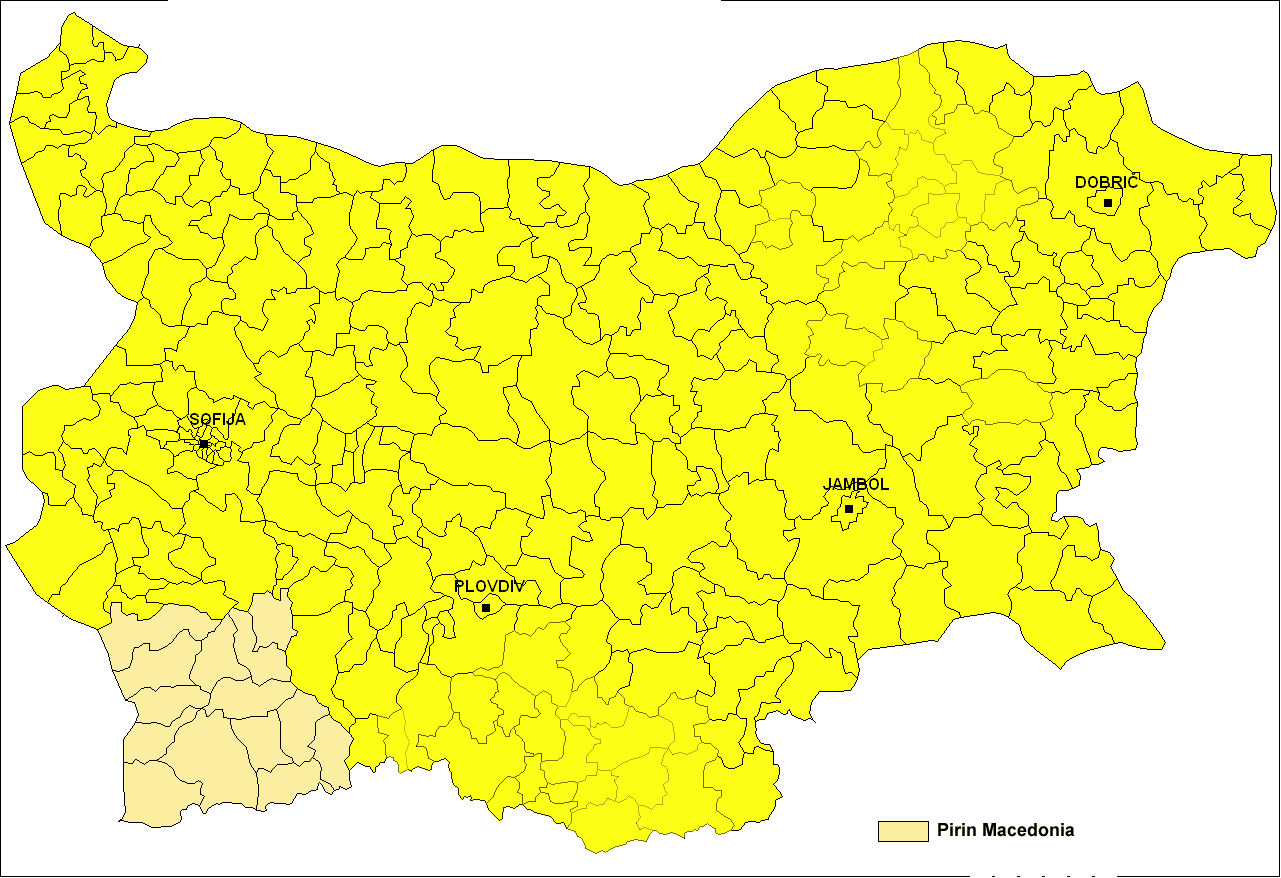
Pirin Macedonia within Bulgaria

A total of 3,100 people in the Blagoevgrad District declared themselves Macedonian in the 2001 census (0.9% of the population of the region). According to the European Court of Human Rights ethnic Macedonians in Bulgaria have endured violations of human rights by the Bulgarian government.

In Bulgaria today, the Macedonian question has been understood largely as a result of the violation of national integrity, beginning with the revision of the Treaty of San Stefano from 1878. Bulgaria denies the existence of a separate Macedonian identity. The Bulgarian denouncement is based on the strong sense of loss of the territory, history and language which it shared with present-day North Macedonia in the past. After the collapse of the Socialist Federative Republic of Yugoslavia and the consequent independence of the Macedonian state in 1991, Bulgaria continued to question of the legitimacy of Macedonian nationhood, yet at the same time recognised the new state. The Bulgarian government of 1991 promoted this political compromise as a constructive way of living with the national question, rather than suppressing them. Yet none of the fundamental tensions over the Macedonian question have been fully resolved, and the issue remains an important undercurrent in Sofia politics.

=== Albania ===
The South Slavic minority in Albania is concentrated in two regions, Mala Prespa and Golloborda. In the 1930s the orthodox Slavs living in Albania were regarded as Bulgarians by the local Albanian population. The new Albanian state did not attempt to assimilate this minority or to forcibly change the names of local towns and villages. During the second Balkan Conference in 1932 the Bulgarian and Albanian delegations signed a Protocol about the recognition of the ethnic Bulgarian minority in Albania. After World War II, the creation of People's Republic of Macedonia and the policy of the new communist states about the founding of Balkan Federative Republic changed the situation and an ethnic Macedonian minority was officially recognized. Schools and radio stations in Macedonian were founded in the area. Albania has recognised around 5,000 strong Macedonian minority. In Albania are both Bulgarian and Macedonian organizations. Each of them claims that the local Slavic population is either Bulgarian or Macedonian. The population itself, which is predominantly Muslim, has, however, preferred to call itself Albanian in official censuses.

=== North Macedonia ===
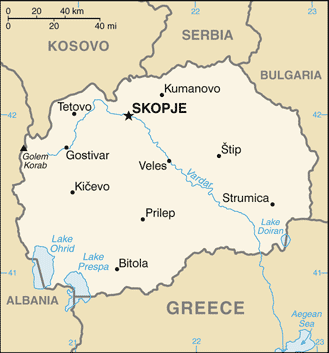
North Macedonia.

North Macedonia officially celebrates 1991 with regard to the referendum endorsing independence from Yugoslavia, albeit legalizing participation in "future union of the former states of Yugoslavia". The ethnic Macedonians of North Macedonia have demonstrated without any exception a strong and even aggressive at times Macedonian consciousness. Any ties with the Bulgarians have been denounced. During this period it has been claimed by Macedonian scholars that there exist large and oppressed ethnic Macedonian minorities in the region of Macedonia, located in neighboring states. Because of those claims, irredentist proposals are being made calling for the expansion of the borders of Macedonia to encompass the territories allegedly populated with ethnic Macedonians. The population of the neighboring regions is presented as "subdued" to the propaganda of the governments of those neighboring countries, and in need their incorporation into a United Macedonia. By the time Macedonia proclaimed its independence those who continued to look to Bulgaria were very few. Some 3,000–4,000 people that stuck to their Bulgarian identity met great hostility among the authorities and the rest of the population. Occasional trials against "Bulgarophiles" have continued until today. The Constitutional Court of Republic of Macedonia banned the organization of the Bulgarians in the Republic of Macedonia-Radko as "promoting racial and religious hate and intolerance". In 2009 the European Court of Human Rights in Strasbourg, condemned Republic of Macedonia because of violations of the European Convention of Human Rights in this case. Nevertheless, during the last two decades, rising economic prosperity and the EU membership of Bulgaria has seen more than 100,000 Macedonians with Bulgarian citizenship; in order to obtain it they must sign a statement declaring they are Bulgarians by origin. However, this phenomenon is primarily caused by economic reasons because the Bulgarian passport, contrary to the Macedonian one, allows free entry to EU states and the right to seek employment. The passports are issued at a cost of several hundred euros and also provide the Macedonian notaries an opportunity for corrupt earnings as they submit false declarations on their clients behalf in which they declare Bulgarian origin of their parents. Probably the most prominent Macedonian that applied for and was granted Bulgarian citizenship is former Prime Minister Ljubčo Georgievski. Bulgarian governments justify this policy because they regard Macedonians as ethnopolitically disoriented Bulgarians. Some researchers have described the Bulgarian policy as a form of passportization, claiming that its purpose is Bulgarisation of Macedonians.

== See also ==
- Macedonia (terminology)
- Macedonia (region)
- Demographic history of North Macedonia
- Macedonia (Greece) Demographic history
- Blagoevgrad Province Demographics
