= Révai nagy lexikona =

Encyclopedia

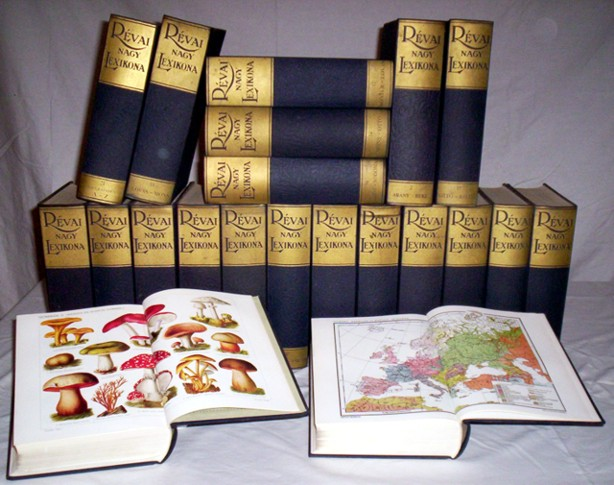
Révai nagy lexikona

The Great Lexicon of Révai (Hungarian: Révai nagy lexikona) is a general lexicon in Hungarian, published by the Révai Brothers Literary Institute between 1911 and 1935. The continuation of the late 20th century is the new lexicon of Révai.

== History ==
Starting from the large lexicon of Pallas, Mór János Révay wanted to create a modern lexicon containing up-to-date scientific results. Therefore, he involved almost the entire Hungarian scientific world in the editing. The editorial staff had a total of 877 staff members – it would be unworthy to highlight anyone – 149 former university professors, 50 academic members, 20 physicists and mathematicians, 27 ministers or secretaries of state, 69 lawyers and 33 doctors.

The twenty volumes without completion contain about 1,050 pages (16,671 two-column pages), 230,000 headings, about 113 million letters, and thousands of figures. The color map appendices were prepared by Révai Cartography specifically for this purpose.

Almost half of the scope is geographical (14%), legal (6.5%), world historical (6%), medical (5%), zoological (4%), botanical (3.5%), artistic (3%), deals with Hungarian historical (3%) topics.

== New edition ==
In 1995–96, Babits Publishing House in Szekszárd published twenty-one volumes of the great lexicon of Révai in a similar edition.

It can be read electronically on the website of the Hungarian Electronic Library: http://mek.oszk.hu/06700/06758/pdf/

== Order of volumes ==
Volume Number	Volume title	Year of publication	Number of pages
Volume I	A–Arany	1911	822
Volume II	Arány–Beke	1911	802
Volume III	Béke–Brutto	1911	793
Volume IV	Brutus–Csát	1912	779
Volume V	Csata–Duc	1912	787
Volume VI	Dúc–Etele	1912	787
Volume VII	Etelka–Földöv	1913	779
Volume VIII	Földpálya–Grec	1913	788
Volume IX	Gréc–Herold	1913	810
Volume X	Hérold–Jób	1914	875
Volume XI	Jób–Kontúr	1914	875
Volume XII	Kontúr–Lovas	1915	875
Volume XIII	Lovas–Mons	1915	875
Volume XIV	Mons–Ottó	1916	916
Volume XV	Ottó–Racine	1922	811
Volume XVI	Racine–Sodoma	1924	873
Volume XVII	Sodoma–Tarján	1925	875
Volume XVIII	Tarján–Vár	1925	788
Volume XIX	Vár–Zsüri + completion: Aachen–Beöthy	1926	866
Volume XX	completion: Bér–Zsolt	1927	872
Volume XXI	completion: A–Z	1935	856

== Sources ==
- volumes of the work
- OSzK
- Révay Mór János sírja a Kerepesi Temetőben
- Iskolázás, értelmiség és tudomány a 19–20. századi Magyarországon
