= A Pallas nagy lexikona =

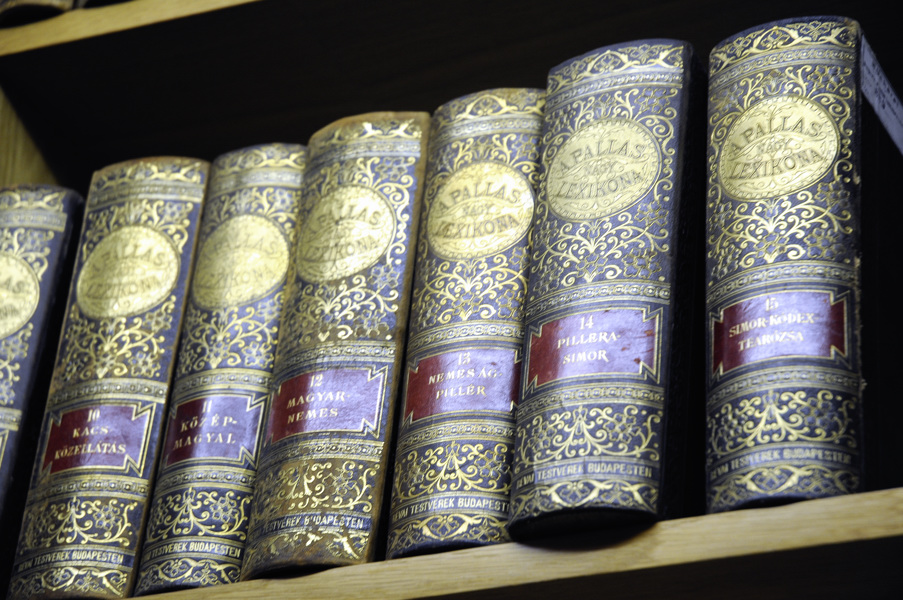
- Language: Hungarian
- Published: 1893-1897
- Publisher: Pallas Literary and Press Corporation
- Publication place: Hungary

A Pallas nagy lexikona (Pallas's Large Encyclopedia) was the first Hungarian encyclopedia which was not a translation from other languages. It was published by the Pallas Literary and Press Corporation between 1893 and 1897. The encyclopedia comprised 16 volumes, 150 000 articles, and it was the work of 300 authors.

== History ==
A Pallas nagy lexikona (literally Pallas's large encyclopedia) is a great universal encyclopedia in Hungarian.

It gradually developed in the years 1893 to 1897 in Budapest. In 1900 it was issued as two parts, but the Encyclopedia eventually reached a total of 18 volumes containing more than 150,000 entries. Chief editor was József Bokor. The authors were renowned Hungarian scientists, most of whom were members of the Hungarian Academy of Sciences. In 1911, the company published under the title Révai Nagy Lexikona. In the 20th century in Hungary it achieved great popularity. The latest edition was published in 1935 in 21 volumes. In 1998, the encyclopedia was completely digitized by Arcanum Adatbázis Kft., and sold on compact discs.

== Order of volumes ==
Volume Number	Volume title	Year of publication	Number of pages
Volume 1	A–Aradmegye	1893	812
Volume 2	Arafale–Békalen	1893	837
Volume 3	Békalencse–Burgonyavész	1893	845
Volume 4	Burgos–Damjanich	1893	884
Volume 5	Dammara–Elektromos gép	1893	861
Volume 6	Elektromos hal–Fék	1894	803
Volume 7	Fekbér–Geszt	1894	965
Volume 8	Gesztely–Hegyvám	1894	816
Volume 9	Hehezet–Kacor	1895	1027
Volume 10	Kacs–Közellátás	1895	965
Volume 11	Közép–Magyal	1895	823
Volume 12	Magyar–Nemes	1896	1047
Volume 13	Nemes ág–Pillér	1896	1065
Volume 14	Pillera–Simor	1897	1115
Volume 15	Simor-kódex–Tearózsa	1897	980
Volume 16	Téba–Zsuzsok	1897	1242
Volume 17 (I)	A–J	1904	792
Volume 18 (II)	K–Z	1904	864
