= Macedonia for the Macedonians =

Macedonian-Bulgarian political slogan

Macedonia for the Macedonians (Bulgarian: Македония за македонците, romanized: Makedoniya za makedontsite; Greek: Μακεδονία για τους Μακεδόνες, romanized: Makedonía gia tous Makedónes; Macedonian: Македонија на Македонците, romanized: Makedonija na Makedoncite; Serbian: Македонија за Македонце / Makedonija za Makedonce) is a slogan and political or national concept used during the first half of the 20th century in the region of Macedonia. As political, it aimed to encompass all the nationalities in the area, into a separate supranational entity.

== History ==
=== William Gladstone and contemporaries ===
The slogan was raised by the British politician William Ewart Gladstone in 1897, in an often misquoted citation, when he promoted the idea on some kind of mini-Balkan Federation in this region. Namely, in a letter Gladstone sent to the Byron Society, disccusing the Macedonian question he stated:

Next to the Ottoman Government nothing can be more deplorable and blameworthy than jealousies between Greek and Slav, and plans by the States already existing for appropriating other territory. Why not Macedonia for Macedonians as well as Bulgaria for Bulgarians and Servia for Servians.

He also forecasted that, if Macedonians do not stand together in the face of the territorial aspirations, they would certainly be devoured by the existing states. Gladstone appealed for the right of self-determination of the peoples who resided in the region, while Britain proceeded in the following period contemplating the creation of an autonomous Macedonia with a Christian governor as a possible solution of the Macedonian question. On that occasion, the British journalist G. W. Steevens also noted in the preface of the brochure containing the letter of Gladstone, that he has used "Macedonians" as a collective name of the diverse population of the region. Steevens explained that there were at least six different kind of Macedonians at that time. Once Gladstone launched the motto, this maxim became widely known. In 1898, the historian William Miller, who visited Macedonia during that period, stressed that it was overrun by rivaling national propagandas, especially Bulgarian, Serb, and Greek who saw Macedonia as their promised land. About Gladstone's proclamation and his motto, Miller approved the creation of an autonomous or independent state of Macedonia, but he stated that this idea is not practical because there was no Macedonian nation and the whole difficulty in this country is that it is a mixture of different warring nationalities. By that reason per Allen Upward that phrase could not have been used by anybody, who had a first hand knowledge of that country. In fact a few accepted then the idea that there might be a separate Macedonian nation.

=== Modern authors ===
By the term "Macedonians", different modern authors also believe Gladstone had in mind the various ethnic groups residing in Macedonia, such as Bulgarians, Greeks, Jews, Turks, Aromanians and Albanians; not an imagined "Macedonian" ethnic group. Historian Marin V. Pundeff summarizes that "Macedonia, in Gladstone's phrase, was for the Macedonians, that is, not only for the Bulgarian element... but for all the other ethnic elements residing in it as well". According to historian Benjamin Lieberman, these included as well those who saw themselves as a separate Macedonian nationality. Per anthropologist Anastasia Karakasidou, national activists in Bulgaria used the phrase to call for the creation of an autonomous Macedonia, although as an intermediate phase towards Greater Bulgaria.

Other modern authors interpret Gladstone's statement as acknowledging the Macedonians as a separate nationality, According to anthropologist Keith Brown, essentially Gladstone gave one answer himself, the Greek, Bulgarian, Serbian irredentist ambitions prevented Macedonia for Macedonians from existence and usurped any aspirations that the population may had.

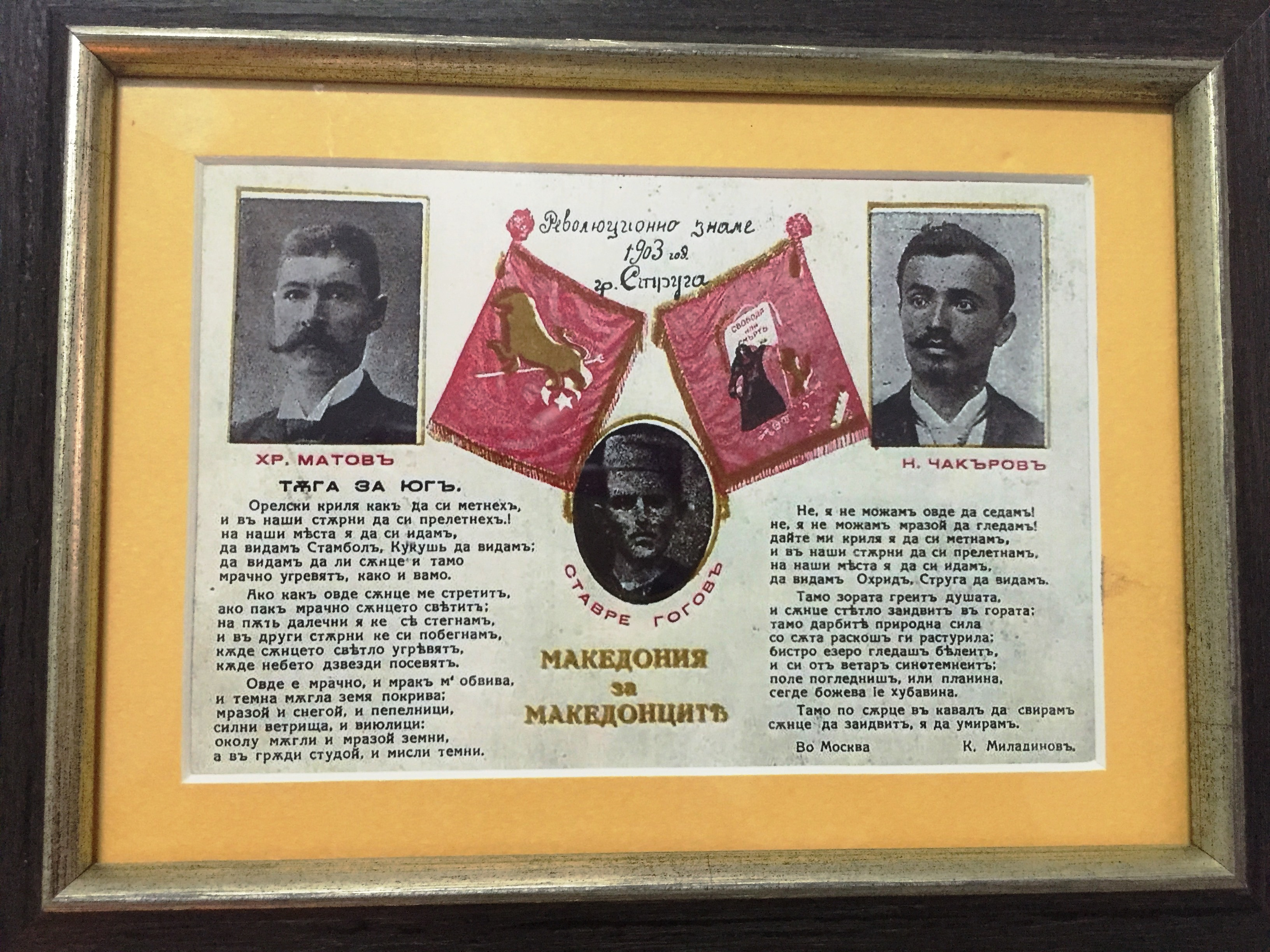
A poster from the 1930s, issued by the Struga fraternity in Sofia, containing the motto.

=== Organizations ===
The motto was adopted by the Internal Macedonian-Adrianople Revolutionary Organization (IMARO) and by the Macedo-Romanian Cultural Society (MRCS), in the early 20th century. At that time, according to Vasil Kanchov the local Bulgarians and Aromanians called themselves Macedonians, and the surrounding nations called them so.

=== Internal Macedonian-Adrianople Revolutionary Organization ===
Under the "Macedonia for the Macedonians" slogan IMARO expressed resentment felt against the irredentist aspirations over Macedonia as much as toward the Ottoman rule, and anticipated that it would restrain the region's partition by the warring Balkan states. Thus, in order to enforce the idea of autonomy, IMARO changed its exclusively Bulgarian character, and opened it to all Macedonians and Thracians regardless of nationality, who wished to participate in the anti-Ottoman movement. In an article published in June 1902, the IMARO revolutionaries promoted the idea of autonomy and the slogans "Macedonia for the Macedonians". The Organization gave a guarantee for the preservation of all national communities there, and insisted that the Bulgarians could be proud of their tolerance, in opposition to Romanians, Serbs and Greeks. They also planned that the administration of the future autonomous Macedonia will rely on the Bulgarian majority. Those revolutionaries saw the future autonomous Macedonia as a multinational polity, and "Macedonian" was an umbrella term covering Greeks, Bulgarians, Turks, Aromanians and Megleno-Romanians, Albanians, Serbs, etc. However, there was no clear concept about the ultimate outcome of the autonomy, some of the members, especially those with leftist inclination, saw it as independent Macedonia, while others saw it as step for the incorporation of Macedonia into the Bulgarian state. The British Consul in Skopje Raphael Fontana wrote on the occasion of the Ilinden Uprising in 1903 that the revolutionaries were working for a general Bulgarian uprising in order to reach their goal of "Macedonia for the Macedonians", understood to mean "Macedonia for the Bulgarians".

In 1902, Boris Sarafov tried to gain Serbian support for a "Macedonia for Macedonians", arguing that it was the only way to oppose Bulgarian annexationism. However one year later he changed his position, seeking a military intervention from Bulgaria in order to aid the Ilinden Uprising.

In 1905 the Serres group of Yane Sandanski accused the Supreme Macedonian-Adrianople Committee activists that under the motto “Macedonia for the Macedonians” they put a disguised motto “Macedonia for Bulgaria”. The idea of autonomous Macedonia was understood by the Organization as an independent state, which will enter as a separate member into the Balkan Federation.

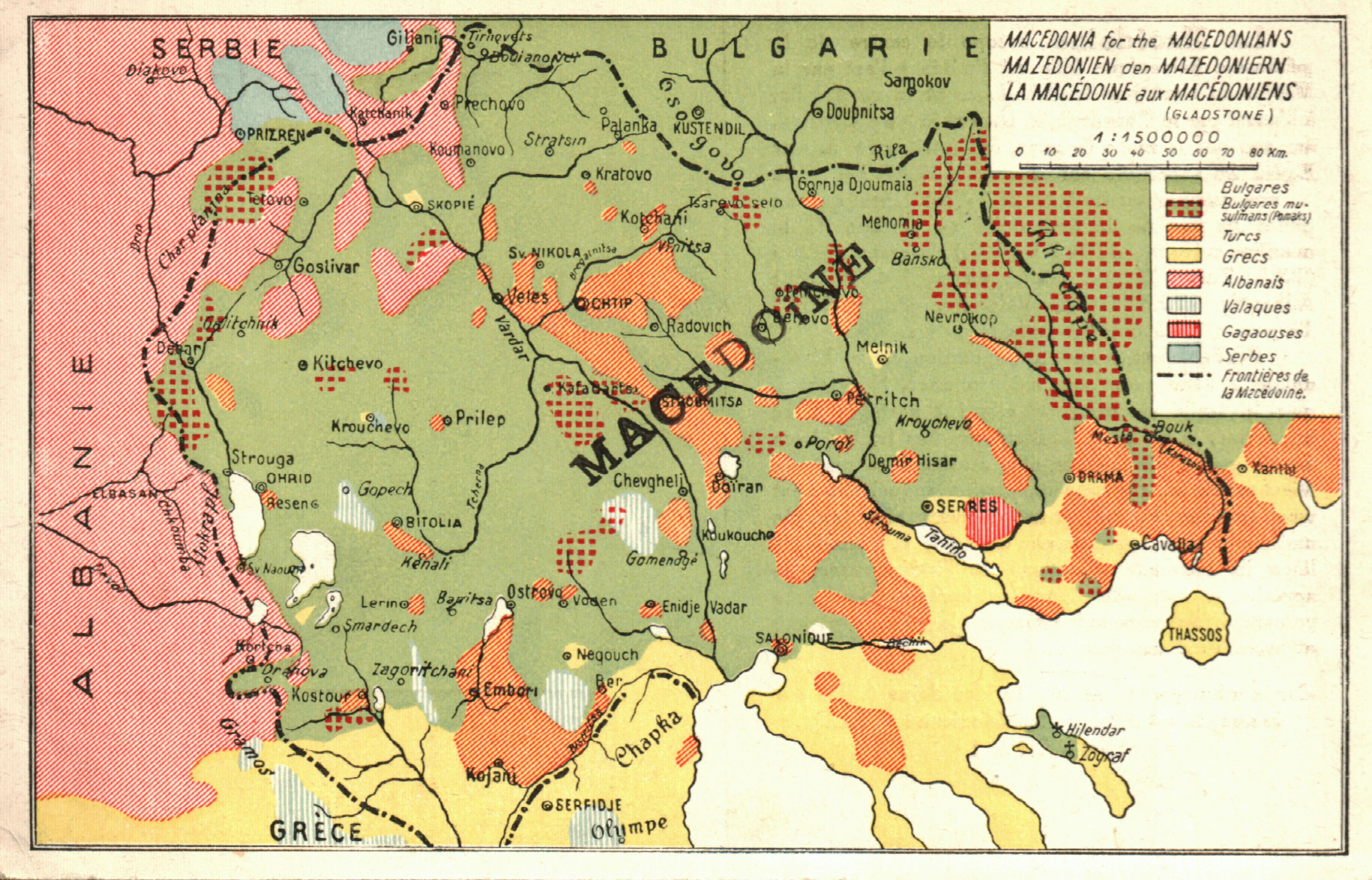
A postcard containing the motto with a demographic map of Macedonia, issued by the Union of Macedonian Students in Vienna during the 1920s. According to the map, the ethnic composition of the population included Bulgarians, Bulgarian Muslims (Pomaks) Greeks, Albanians, Serbs, Turks, Gagauzes and "Vlachs" (Aromanians and Megleno-Romanians).

During the 1920s the descendant of the IMARO - IMRO followed also the idea about an independent united Macedonian multiethnic state with prevailing Bulgarian element, something as "Switzerland on the Balkans" and kept the slogan Macedonia for the Macedonians until it became defunct in 1934. Another descendant of IMARO was IMRO (United), which during the 1930s sought for an independent Macedonian state with a separate Macedonian nation.

=== Macedo-Romanian Cultural Society ===
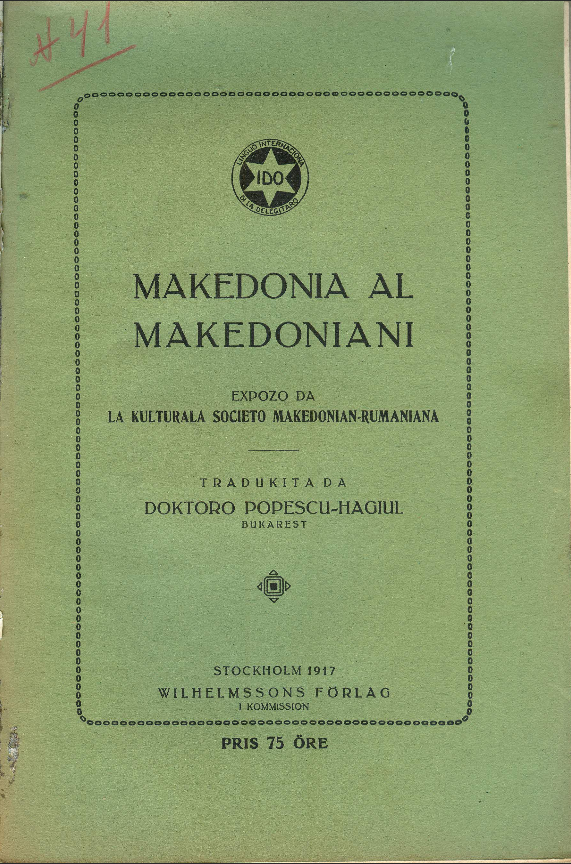
1912 Aromanian memoir (in its 1917 Ido edition), called Macedonia for the Macedonians, which insists on an autonomous Macedonia based on the Swiss model because the area is ethnically diverse.

The Macedo-Romanian Cultural Society had as its members the acting Prime and Foreign Ministers, as well as the Head of the Romanian Orthodox Church, and the elite of the Romanian political class. In 1912 an Aromanian memoir was published in Bucharest, after the outbreak of the Balkan War. The memoir was signed by five prominent Romanian and Aromanian public figures, members of the society. In it, the Macedo-Romanian Cultural Society, using the slogan Macedonia for the Macedonians, stated that Macedonia's autonomy is the best solution of the Macedonian question. As the region was ethnically diverse, an autonomous, neutral, cantonized by Swiss model state was proposed, where all nationalities will preserve their mother tongues and religions, enjoying the same democratic political rights. In 1917, during the First World War, the memoir was translated into Esperanto and was published in Stockholm. The memoir was presented to the Peace Conference in Paris in 1919.

=== Macedonian Federative Organization ===
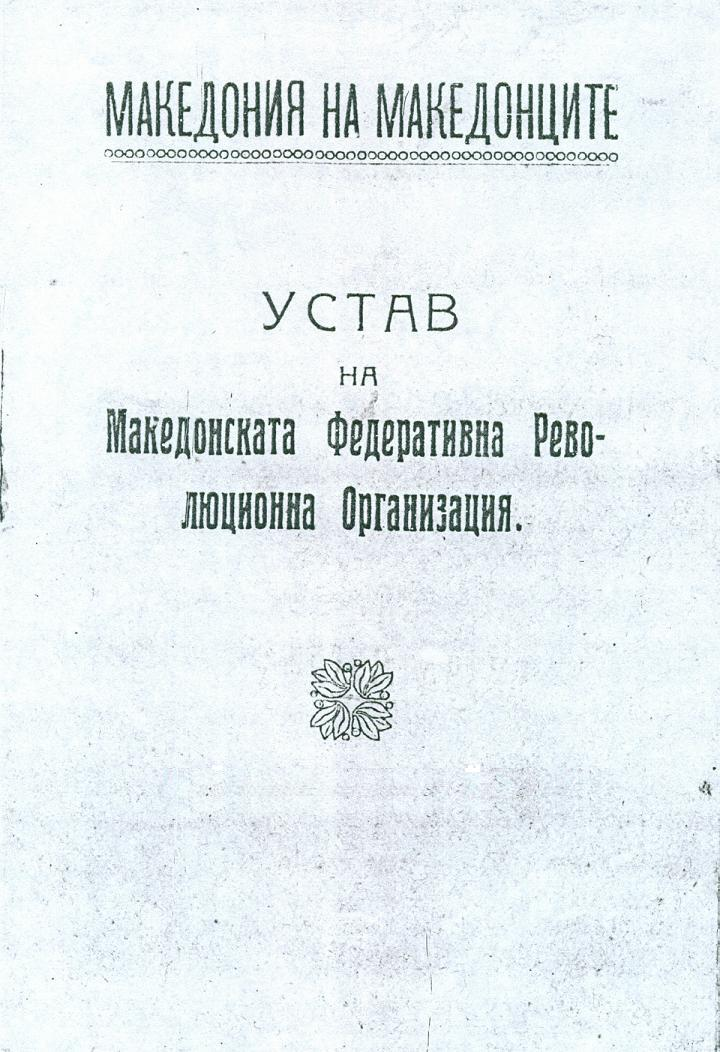
The front page of the statute of the MFO with "Macedonia for the Macedonians" at top.

In 1921 the members of the left wing of the former IMARO created the Macedonian Federative Organization (MFO), under the Macedonia for the Macedonians motto. The goal of MFO was the creation of an independent Macedonia with intention of joining a future Balkan Federation. Also, the state would have full and equal participation in its governance of all its nationalities. Further they recommended dropping the diverse ethnic designations in Macedonia and uniting all national elements in a distinct entity Macedonians. In 1924, MFO alongside the IMRO, the Bulgarian Communist Party and the Comintern created the May Manifesto.

=== Macedonian Patriotic Organization ===
The Balkan Wars (1912–1913) and World War I (1914–1918) left the area divided mainly between Greece and Serbia (later Yugoslavia), which resulted in significant changes in its ethnic composition. The Bulgarian community was reduced, either by population exchanges or by forcible change of communities' ethnic identity. In this way the motto began to lose its authenthic character. Macedonian immigrants in the United States and Canada founded in 1922 in Fort Wayne, Indiana, the Macedonian Patriotic Organization. The founders of the MPO in their aspirations for a free and independent Macedonia also accepted the slogan "Macedonia for the Macedonians". The use of "Macedonians" and "Macedonian emigrants" then equally applied to all ethnic groups in Macedonia - Bulgarians, Wallachians, Turks, Albanians, Greeks and others.

== See also ==
- Svoboda ili smart
- Independent Macedonia
- Autonomy for Macedonia
- Macedonian Question
- Macedonian nationalism
- Ullah millet
- Principality of Pindus
