= Petar Chaulev =

Bulgarian revolutionary (1882–1924)

Voivode Petar Chaulev
- Петър Чаулев
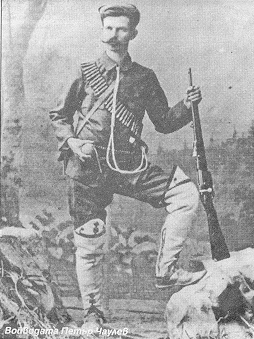
- Petar Chaulev in uniform.
- Born: c. 1882; Ohrid, Manastir Vilayet, Ottoman Empire (now Republic of North Macedonia)
- Died: December 23, 1924 (aged 41–42); Milan, Kingdom of Italy
- Cause of death: Assassination
- Citizenship: Ottoman/Bulgarian
- Military career
- Allegiance: Kruševo Republic; Tsardom of Bulgaria
- Branch: IMRO; Bulgarian Army
- Conflicts: Ilinden Uprising; Balkan Wars; First Balkan War; Bulgarian front; Second Balkan War; Ohrid–Debar uprising; World War I; Macedonian front

Petar Chaulev (Bulgarian: Петър Чаулев; Macedonian: Петар Чаулев, romanized: Petar Čaulev; Albanian: Petar Çaulev; 1882 – December 23, 1924) was a Bulgarian revolutionary in Ottoman Macedonia. He was a local leader of the Internal Macedonian Revolutionary Organization (IMRO).

== Biography ==
=== Early life ===
He was born into an Orthodox Albanian family in Ohrid. His father was a Tosk Albanian fisherman from southern Albania. Chaulev was fluent in Albanian, and spent several years living in Albania where he was nicknamed 'Petrush'. He studied at a three-grade school in Ohrid, and graduated from the Bulgarian High School in Bitola. Chaulev was an organizer of the revolutionary committees in the Ohrid, Prespa and Lerin regions in the 1890s. His baptism by fire was in 1897 by torching the house of the Ottoman bey in Debarca region. Shortly after, Chaulev was appointed as a secretary in the cheta of Deyan Dimitrov. He worked as a teacher in Ohrid during 1901–1902 and the village of Popolzhani in the Lerin (Florina) region until the winter of 1902/1903. After the end of the 1902/1903 school year, Chaulev returned to Ohrid for his revolutionary activity. In the Ilinden-Preobrazhenie Uprising, he was a voivode and head of the Ohrid revolutionary committee. Chaulev participated in a battle near Kuratica, where his cheta was forced to retreat due to lack of ammunition and weapons. After the failure of the uprising, Chaulev and some of his revolutionaries voluntarily surrendered to the Austrian consul in Bitola.

After the uprising, he was the district commander and a member of the Bitola District Committee. Chaulev continued working as a close associate of Hristo Uzunov, who gave him orders to liquidate people suspected to have betrayed the organization. After Uzunov's death in 1905, Chaulev and Deyan Dimitrov took over the leadership of the organization in Ohrid region. According to Serbian sources, in August 1905, he executed two pro-Serbian activists from Ohrid region. In January 1906 he moved to Kičevo to combat Serbianization in the region, but returned to Ohrid shortly after. In August 1906 he tried to launch an attack on the group of Ismail Čauš but was intercepted by the Ottoman army and forced to retreat. He participated as a delegate in IMRO's Kyustendil Congress in 1908. He declared himself against the disarmament of IMRO after the Young Turk Revolution in 1908. Chaulev was elected as a member of IMRO's Central Committee in 1911.

=== Balkan Wars and World War I ===
Chaulev participated in the Balkan Wars, Tikveš uprising and Ohrid–Debar uprising in 1913. In October 1912, on the emergency congress of IMRO in Thessaloniki, it was decided that "...everyone should return to the mountains and their regions", and that the IMRO should support the Serbian and Bulgarian armies in the First Balkan War. Chaulev returned to Debarca, and after the war started, as a commander of a volunteer detachment in the Ohrid–Struga region, he supported the offensive of the allied Serbian troops in Vardar Macedonia. Chaulev participated in the battles near Pribilci and Brežani on November 4 and 5. On November 6, he participated in a 15-hour battle near Bukovo, where his detachment managed to capture 290 Ottoman soldiers. However, after the war ended, the Serbian authorities issued orders to collect the weapons from the locals, and started arrests of Macedonian revolutionaries, including Chaulev. He was convicted of "forcing and blackmailing Ottoman families to collect their gold". Chaulev and his inmates managed to escape the prison, and fled to the Bulgarian units in eastern Macedonia. During the period between the First and Second Balkan War, Chaulev's cheta had light clashes with the Serbian forces in Kruševo region, and later in Ohrid.

During the Ohrid–Debar Uprising, his detachment managed to capture Ohrid, after which he was appointed as the main commander of the rebels. Chaulev then headed towards Kičevo to cut the road of the Serbian forces heading towards Ohrid, and took part in a heavy battle near the village Ivančišta, where he was forced to retreat. On September 17, after the Serbian forces recaptured Ohrid and Struga, he entered Kičevo. On the next day he ordered to disband the chetas and retreat towards Debar, and from there towards the mountains. From there, Chaulev retreated in Albania.

During the Bulgarian occupation of Serbia in World War I, he was the district chief of Ohrid. Chaulev was included in the administrative section of the 11th Macedonian Infantry Division.

=== Interwar period ===
After the war, he participated with Todor Aleksandrov and Aleksandar Protogerov in the re-creation of IMRO. He became part of IMRO's new central committee in 1919. As a member of the Central Committee, he was responsible for organizing armed actions from Italy and Albania, but was unable to cope with this task. In 1922, Chaulev signed a memorandum to the president of the League of Nations, where he and the other members of the Central Committee requested requested the creation of an independent Macedonia as a protectorate of the League of Nations. During 1923, he traveled to Rome to coordinate the help from Italy for the organization. There, he also established contacts with representatives of the Soviet embassy and with Communist International figures, where the diplomat Yan Strauyan suggested IMRO to capture Kyustendil, which Chaulev rejected, seeing it as "pointless" and as "act of revenge against Aleksandar Stamboliyski for his persecution of the Macedonians".

However, Chaulev did not have major influence from Italy and was marginalized by Aleksandrov and Protogerov. Later, he also held a meeting with Protogerov there, which erupted into verbal conflict. Chaulev distanced himself from the June coup and September Uprising in Bulgaria, stating that stating that his intention was "cooperation of all national groups fighting for the freedom of peoples on the principle of self-determination and the creation of a Balkan federation". His long-term stay outside of Macedonia provoked a reaction from Aleksandrov, who accused Chaulev of disgracing the organization by living off its funds in the diaspora and not fulfilling his duties. Furthermore, on September 30, Aleksandrov sent him a letter, stating that if he did not return to Macedonia within 10 days of receiving it, he should resign from the Committee to avoid being expelled from within. However, Chaulev did not return to Macedonia, fearing that it may be a trap to assassinate him. Aleksandrov later shifted his decision to give him another chance, and together with Protogerov and Dimitar Vlahov, they met him in Rome. There they decided that Chaulev and Vlahov should go to Vienna to meet representatives of the Macedonian Federative Organization, where they made an agreement to unite all groups under the goal of independence or autonomy of a Macedonian state, and to negotiate with the Soviet government over support for IMRO and Macedonia.

In 1924, IMRO forged connections with the Communist International (Comintern). As a result, Chaulev signed the so-called "May Manifesto" in Vienna along with Protogerov and Aleksandrov concerning the formation of a Balkan Communist Federation and cooperation with the Soviet Union. Under pressure by the Bulgarian government, Aleksandrov and Protogerov denied that they had ever signed any agreement, claiming that the May Manifesto was a communist forgery. Aleksandrov later declared Chaulev as a traitor and expelled him from the Central Committee. Disappointed with the involvement of the Bulgarian government in IMRO's affairs, as well as IMRO's involvement in Bulgarian internal affairs, Chaulev sent a letter to Aleksandar Protogerov where he stated: "We must free ourselves from all Bulgarian parties, work only for Macedonia and with Macedonians, otherwise everyone will condemn us and we will only be grist to their party mills, and Macedonia will cry." Shortly after, Aleksandrov was assassinated by IMRO voivodes. IMRO sentenced Chaulev to death. Chaulev, who did not abandon the Manifesto and was suspected as involved in Aleksandrov's murder, was assassinated in Milan on December 23, 1924, by IMRO revolutionary Dimitar Stefanov, on the orders of Ivan Mihaylov.

Chaulev published the book Skipnia (Albania) in 1924 in Istanbul.

Chaulev was married and had four children. His daughters were named Avgustina, Dobrа, and Zdravka, while his son was named Kiril.

== Bibliography ==
- Todoroska, Katerina (2015). Петар Чаулев: Живот и Дело [Petar Čaulev: Life and Work] (in Macedonian). Skopje: Faculty of Philosophy, Ss. Cyril and Methodius University. ISBN 978-608-238-069-8.
