= Makedonsko delo =

- Motto; Independent Macedonia and Balkan Federation
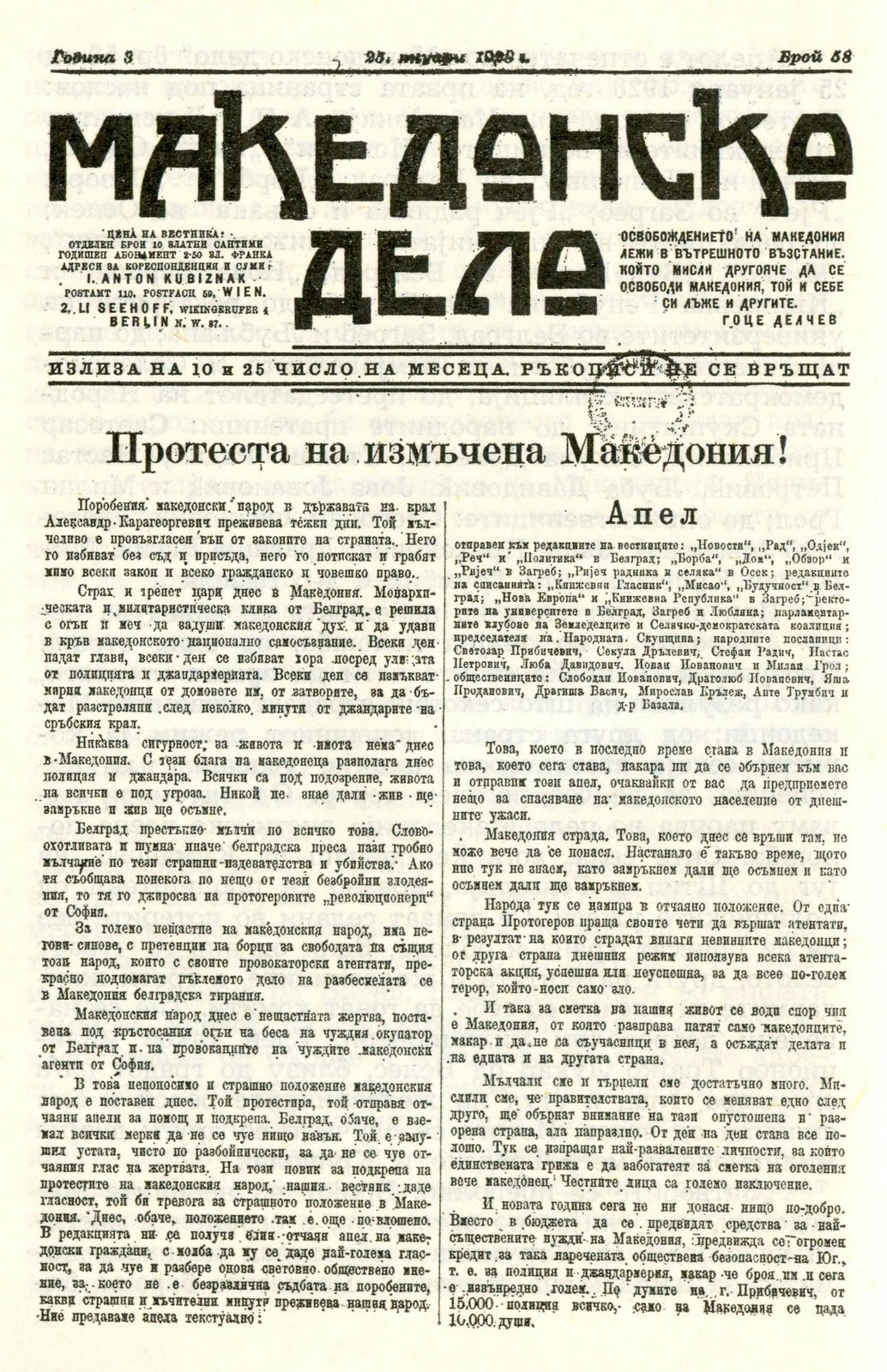
- Issue 58, January 23, 1928
- Native name: Македонско дело
- Editor-in-chief: Vladimir Poptomov
- Editor: Dimitar Vlahov, Rizo Rizov, Georgi Zankov, Yordan Anastasov, Dino Kyosev, Georgi Karadzhov
- Launched: September 10, 1925
- Ceased publication: May 25, 1935
- Language: Bulgarian
- City: Vienna, Paris, Berlin

Makedonsko delo (Bulgarian/Macedonian: Македонско дело, lit.:"Macedonian cause") was a newspaper connected to the IMRO (United) and came out on the 10th and 25th of each month in Bulgarian language. It was printed in Berlin, Vienna, and Paris. The newspaper started on September 10, 1925, and had notable people in the editorial committee like Dimitar Vlahov, Vladimir Poptomov, and Pavel Shatev. In total, 179 issues were published, with the last one on May 25, 1935.

== History ==
During the 1920s there were many leftist activists from Macedonia in foreign land, the most notable ones being with a base in Vienna. In 1925 they formed the Internal Macedonian Revolutionary Organization (United) and its organ Makedonsko delo.

Makedonsko delo began to publish issues on September 10, 1925, it supported the ideas of the May Manifesto. The first issue was edited by Dimitar Vlahov, and he was the main editor of the first few editions before Vladimir Poptomov became the main editor. The main mission of the newspaper was to be a different from the previous ones which were written in the spirit of Bulgarian supremacism and nationalism and to fight for the unity and freedom of Macedonian people and their federalizing with the rest of the Balkan people. The main motto of the newspaper was "Independent Macedonia and Balkan Federation". It was published in standard Bulgarian.

The main editor Vladimir Poptomov also used multiple hidden names such as the name "V. Gramov". The newspaper was also anti-fascist and was against Nazi Germany.

Makedonsko delo published for the first time in April 1934 the Resolution of the Comintern on the Macedonian question which was made together with IMRO (United).

== Issues ==
Year	Issue	Date	Source
I	1 – 24	September 10, 1925 – August 25, 1926	
II	25 – 48	September 10, 1926 – August 25, 1927	
III	49 – 72	September 10, 1927 – August 25, 1928	
IV	73 – 96	September 10, 1928 – August 25, 1929	
V	97 – 120	September 10, 1929 – July 1930	
VI	121 – 143	September 10, 1930 – August 10, 1931	
VII	144 – 167	September 25, 1931 – September 25, 1932	
VIII	168 – 179	October 1932 – May 25, 1935	
