= Ekaterina Panitsa =

Ekaterina Panitsa (1884–1967), born as Ekaterina Ivanova Izmirlieva, was a Bulgarian schoolteacher and the wife of the revolutionary Todor Panitsa. She was also part of the Macedonian revolutionary movement.

== Life ==
Ekaterina Ivanova Izmirlieva was born in Kukush (modern Kilkis, Greece), Ottoman Empire, in 1884. Ekaterina was part of the big Izmirliev family, from which revolutionaries and intellectuals were part of. Her parents were Ivan Izmirliev and Rushka Izmirlieva (born Shishkova). Her father was a teacher. Izmirlieva studied in Kukush and then continued to study in Thessaloniki. She graduated from the Bulgarian Girls' High School of Thessaloniki in the academic year 1899/1900 as part of the tenth generation of students. Afterwards, she worked as a teacher in the village of Prosechen in the Drama district in 1901, Thessaloniki in 1902, and the village of Gorno Brodi (modern Ano Vrontou, Greece) in the Serres district. In the academic year 1903/1904, she was a teacher in the village of Skrizhovo in the Zilyakovo region. After meeting the anarchist Yordan Popyordanov, she became close with the anarchist group Boatmen of Thessaloniki and their revolutionary views. After the Thessaloniki bombings, she was arrested and imprisoned on the charge of being close to Popyordanov and other Boatmen, but was soon released.

While working as a teacher in Skrizhovo, she became a member of IMRO. In the following period, she worked as a teacher in the village of Kalapot, Drama region, and then in the village of Gorno Brodi. Here she was given the task of managing correspondence with members in the Serres revolutionary district. In 1905, she was again appointed as a teacher in Prosechen. While working as a teacher in this period, she met the revolutionary Todor Panitsa and eventually married him on May 17, 1907, taking the surname Panitsa. They had a son named Kosta. On August 22, 1907, she participated in the annual Serres regional congress in the village of Lovcha, under the pseudonym Kovalevska. IMRO preferred its "illegal" members to be unmarried, since family ties would prevent them from being entirely committed to the revolutionary cause, so Todor was censured for his marriage with her by the Serres regional committee and she was expelled from the Serres region. After assassinating Boris Sarafov and Ivan Garvanov on November 28, 1907, Todor stayed with her briefly in Nesebar, where she had started working as a teacher. She was arrested in connection with the killings and taken to Sofia, but she was released after a few days.

As Todor was often persecuted by the Ottoman authorities for being a member of IMRO and by the Bulgarian authorities as the killer of Sarafov and Garvanov, they were able to settle down in a house in Nevrokop only after the Balkan Wars. However, they soon had to move to Drama, and then to Sofia until the move to Vienna. Ekaterina was accidentally shot in the mouth in the assassination of Todor by Mencha Karnicheva on May 8, 1925. After the assassination of her husband, Ekaterina remained in Vienna for another 14 years, after which she returned to Sofia. Her memoirs were published in 1963. She died in Sofia in 1967. No photographs of her exist.
