= Solomon Goldstein =

Bulgarian politician (1884–1968)

- Born: May 25, 1884; Shumen, Bulgaria
- Died: May 14, 1968 (aged 83); Moscow, Soviet Union
- Occupation: Politician

Solomon Lazarov Goldstein (Bulgarian: Соломон Лазаров Голдщайн) or Solomon Lazarevič Gol'dštejn (Russian: Соломон Лазаревич Гольдштейн) (25 May 1884 – 14 May 1968) was a Jewish Bulgarian politician, one of the founders of the Bulgarian Metal Workers’ Union and of the Swiss Communist Party.

== Life ==
Goldstein was born in Shumen, a city in the eastern part of the Principality of Bulgaria, to a Jewish family. He was a member of the Bulgarian Social Democratic Workers' Party (Narrow Socialists) from 1906 to 1913. At the outbreak of the Balkan Wars in 1912, he participated as a volunteer in the Macedonian-Adrianopolitan Volunteer Corps of the Bulgarian Army. In 1913 he left Bulgaria for France, where he joined the French Section of the Workers' International. While working in the Renault factories, Goldstein became acquainted with Bolshevism. In 1915 he left France for Zurich, Switzerland, where he met and befriended Vladimir Lenin, the future leader of the October Revolution of 1917. During his stay in Switzerland, he was among the chief participants in the establishment of the Swiss Communist Party.

After spending some time in Moscow from 1918 on, from May 1919 to February 1920, he served as the representative of the Bolshevik Party in Bulgaria. In this capacity, he criticized the perceived "passivity" of the Bulgarian communists under Dimitar Blagoev. He supported the efforts of some extreme-left factions to force the Bulgarian party to action through acts of terrorism, such as the assassination of the former Interior Minister Mihail Takev in January 1920. While in Bulgaria, Goldstein was also active as a journalist in left-wing print media. In a brochure which he signed as "Slavi Zidarov," Goldstein was critical of the Bulgarian Communist Party's inability to turn the 1918 soldier rebellion at Radomir into a nationwide communist revolution.

He returned to now-Soviet Russia in 1920 and was active in the politics of the Comintern until 1921. In 1922–1924 he served as cadre-in-chief of the Soviet legation in the Austrian capital Vienna. According to Aurel Plasari, historian and director of the National Library of Albania, Goldstein was the mastermind behind Albania's June Revolution of 1924. In 1924, the Internal Macedonian Revolutionary Organization entered negotiations with the Comintern about collaboration between the communists and the creation of a united Macedonian movement. Goldstein was active by signing a paper in Vienna (the so-called May Manifesto), in which the objectives of the unified Macedonian liberation movement were presented. He also was present in 1925 by the IMRO (United) Foundation in Vienna.

After the death of Lenin in 1924, Goldstein sided with the left opposition of the Communist Party of the Soviet Union, possibly due to Adolph Joffe's influence. Consequently, he was targeted by Joseph Stalin's purges and suffered political persecution from 1936 until his rehabilitation in 1956. He died in the Soviet capital of Moscow on 14 May 1968.
