= Macedonian Federative Organization =

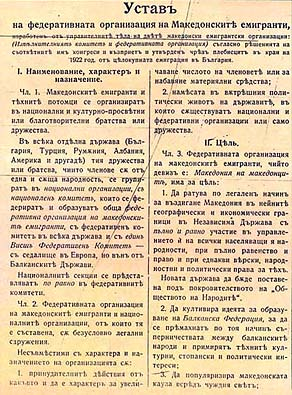
The statute of MFO.

The Macedonian Federative Organization (Bulgarian and Macedonian: Македонска федеративна организация/организација; MFO/МФО) was established in Sofia in 1921 by former Internal Macedonian Revolutionary Organization (IMRO) left-wing's activists.

== History ==
=== Background ===
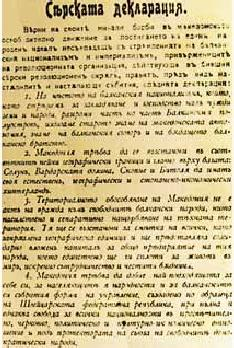
The Serres group declaration.

In November 1918, the members of the left wing of the former Internal Macedonian-Adrianople Revolutionary Organization (IMARO), particularly the Serres group on the initiative of Dimo Hadži Dimov issued a declaration in which they called for the restoration of Macedonia to its original geographical boundaries as the basis of a future Balkan Federation. On the principles of the declaration in 1919 the Temporary representation of the former United Internal Revolutionary Organization was created, which issued an Appeal in March 1919 and send it to the Great Powers on the Paris Peace Conference. In October 1920 the Temporary Commission of the Macedonian Brotherhoods in Bulgaria was formed in Sofia. The commission in their platform determined, that the sons of Macedonia struggled through the years for the realization of the ideals of the population, and while some found the right path, of an autonomous and independent Macedonia in its entirety, others, driven not by reason, but by feelings, were in vain dragged by the mirage of accession with Bulgaria. The members of the commission and the Serres group became the core of the MFO later.

Reestablished in 1920 by the right-wing leaders, the IMRO became a formidable organization, with Pirin Macedonia as its stronghold. From its secure bases in Bulgaria it launched armed attacks and propaganda campaigns into Aegean Macedonia and Vardar Macedonia. In the early 1920s, the IMRO confronted with the left wing of the former IMARO over the ultimate goal of its activity. The right faction led by Todor Alexandrov sought the incorporation of all Macedonian territory into Bulgaria. In contrast, the left faction sought an autonomous Macedonia that could join the Balkan Federation.

=== Origins and goals ===
Amongst the founders of MFO were Gjorche Petrov, one of the leaders of IMARO previously, and Aleksandar Dimitrov who was the Minister of Interior of Bulgaria. The both of them were assassinated by the right-wing IMRO in June and October 1921. The initial leaders of the MFO were Filip Atanasov, Todor Panitsa, Vladislav Kovachev, Hristo Dalkalchev, Nikola Yurukov, Hristo Tatarchev and others. Its adherents were commonly known as "federalists" by way of distinction from the IMRO-members known as "autonomists". In the statute of MFO under the motto Macedonia for the Macedonians, the primary goals were to work in a legal manner for the elevation of Macedonia within its geographical and economic borders into an Independent State with full and equal participation in its governance of all its nationalities, with equal religious, national and political rights for them. Also, to cultivate the idea of forming a Balkan Federation, in order to eliminate the rivalries between the Balkan peoples and reconcile their cultural, economic and political interests. Per the MFO ideologist Vladislav Kovachev, Macedonia was a geographic designation that had to become national. In an attempt to achieve this goal he called for a formation of a distinct national collectivity that, under the designation "Macedonians" would unite the distinct nationalities living in Macedonia, incl. Bulgarians, Turks, Albanians, etc. Kovachev likewise believed in encouraging those people there, who had begun to call themselves "Macedonians", without adding "Bulgarians". The Macedonian nationalism developed by the federalists was further emphasized in the newspaper Macedonian consciousness. They recommended dropping the diverse ethnic designations in Macedonia and uniting all national elements in a distinct entity "Macedonians", historical figures such as Philip II, Alexander the Great and Aristotele appeared on the pages of the newspaper. The federalists' programme contained a formulation of a future Macedonian state using Esperanto as official language. In December 1921, activists of MFO formed the official Macedonian Emigre's Federalist Organization (MEFO) and in 1922 another group formed the clandestine Macedonian Federative Revolutionary Organization (MFRO). The only difference between the MEFO and MFRO was that the MFRO was determined for an armed struggle to achieve the liberation of Macedonia. Both wings of the MFO supported the creation of a federal Macedonian state within a future Balkan Federation, which concept was similar to the ideas proclaimed by the Balkan Communist Federation at that time. As for the relations of the Organization with the Bulgarian government of Aleksandar Stamboliyski, it supported the federalist's movement and was openly hostile to the aspirations of the autonomists. MFO organized a number of armed forays into Pirin Macedonia (Nevrokop and Kyustendil), where it attacked the local IMRO detachments. In March 1923, Stamboliyski, in consequence of the Yugoslav-Bulgarian agreement reached in Niš, began cooperating with Yugoslavia against IMRO. Aided by the government, the federalists set out to destroy the military network of the enemy, but the autonomists scattered the federalist's chetas and launched an attack on the Stamboliyski's government.

=== Decline and dissolution ===
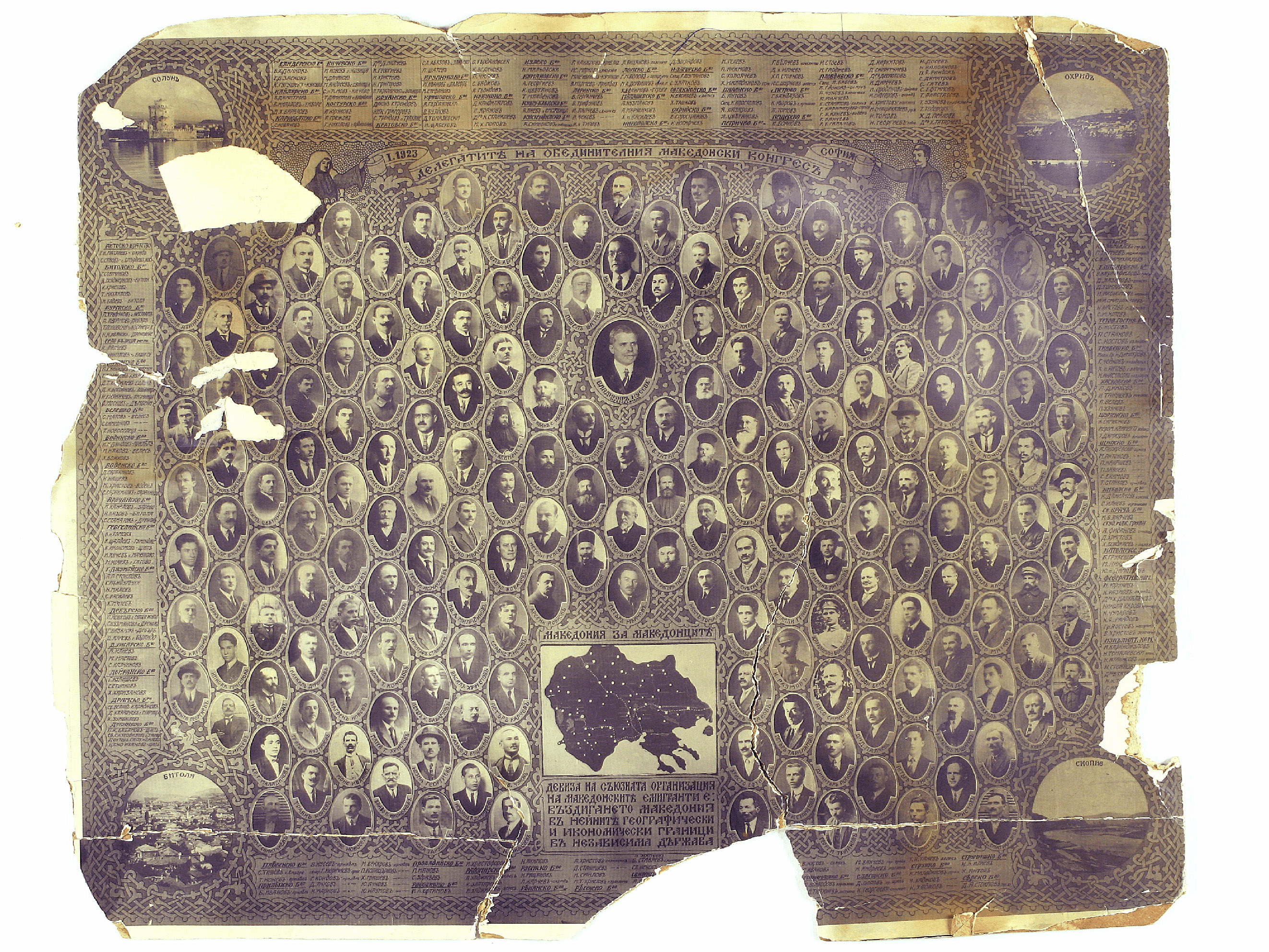
Poster with the participants on the third Congress of MFO (1923).

Violence between the MFO and IMRO reinforced a political crisis growing public impression that Bulgarian governments were unstable. In the summer of 1923, IMRO aided by radical officers, organized a coup d'état. The fall of the government was a great success to the power of IMRO. The new government was condemned by the Communist International, as well as the absent communist resistance to it. When the communists aided by the federalists did try to revolt in the September Uprising, they were quickly crushed by the government and its IMRO allies. As a result, some of the fleeing federalists placed themselves in Yugoslavia, others collaborated with the Greek communists. Todor Panitsa also had to flee and went in Vienna, where the federalist's leadership began seeking foreign contacts, especially Soviet diplomats. They served as mediators by consecution of secret reconciling negotiations with IMRO. Continuing into 1924 secret negotiations between the federalists, BCP and IMRO representatives were conducted to unite all groups under the goal of independence or autonomy of a Macedonian state. The new position of the IMRO was identical to that of the Balkan communists and won for the MFO the endorsement of its policy by the Comintern. The so-called May Manifesto was signed by the sides on 6 May 1924. However, later IMRO officially rejected its support of the document and its leaders even denied endorsing it. In the aftermath of the failed agreement Todor Alexandrov, as well as key figures of the Federalists including Todor Panitsa and Vladislav Kovachev, were assassinated in the subsequent clash. Weakened the organization disappeared as a real entity. Most of its members joined afterwards the IMRO (United) and later the Bulgarian Communist Party.

== See also ==
- Macedonian Question
- Macedonian nationalism

== Sources ==
- Гребенаров, Александър, Легални и тайни организации на македонските бежанци в България (1918–1947), МНИ, София, 2006 г.,470 с.
- The Communist party of Bulgaria: origins and development, 1883–1936, Joseph Rothschild, AMS Press, 1972, ISBN 0-404-07164-3, p. 117.
- „Националноосвободителната борба в Македония, 1919 - 1941 г.“, Колектив, Македонски Научен Институт.
