= Todor Panitsa =

Bulgarian revolutionary figure

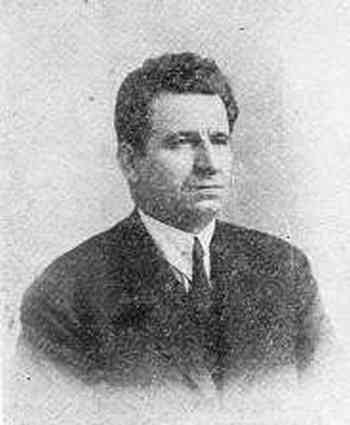
- Born: July 2, 1879; Oryahovo, Bulgaria
- Died: May 8, 1925 (aged 45); Vienna, Austria
- Spouse: Ekaterina Panitsa (m. 1907–1925)
- Military career
- Allegiance: SMAC; IMRO; MFO
- Branch: Bulgarian Army
- Unit: Macedonian-Adrianopolitan Volunteer Corps
- Conflicts: Ilinden Uprising; Balkan Wars; First Balkan War; Bulgarian front; Second Balkan War; First World War; Battle of Krivolak (WIA)

Todor Nikolov Panitsa (Bulgarian: Тодор Николов Паница; July 2, 1879 – May 8, 1925) was a Bulgarian revolutionary figure, active in the region of Macedonia. He was one of the leaders of the left wing of the Internal Macedonian Revolutionary Organization.

== Biography ==
Panitsa was born on July 2, 1879, in Oryahovo, northwestern Bulgaria, a town located on the right bank of the Danube. He grew up in the family of Nikola Panitsa from Tarnovo and Mitanka Peltekova from Svishtov. He studied in Lom, where according to journalist Mihail Dumbalakov, he became familiar with Macedonian matters through his brother. Panitsa became an orphan and went to live with his uncle in Varna, where he completed his secondary education. For around three years, Panitsa served as a cavalryman in the Bulgarian army. He became part of the Macedonian liberation movement in 1902. Like Yane Sandanski, he started off in a band of the Supreme Macedonian-Adrianople Committee. Afterwards, Panitsa joined the Internal Macedonian Revolutionary Organization (IMRO) band of Nikola Pushkarov in 1902, being active in the Skopje, Kumanovo and Kratovo regions. He participated in the Ilinden Uprising in the Skopje region. During 1904, he organized his own band in Varna, and returned to Ottoman Macedonia, where he met Sandanski, becoming one of his closest associates. Panitsa later served as Mihail Daev's deputy.

The failure of the Ilinden Uprising reignited the old rivalries between the varying factions of the Macedonian revolutionary movement. From 1907 he was the Drama district voivode and a member of the Serres revolutionary committee. Panitsa married his schoolteacher fiancée Ekaterina Izmirlieva on May 17 and Daev was his best man. However, IMRO preferred its "illegal" members to be unmarried, since family ties would prevent them from being entirely committed to the revolutionary cause. As a result, Panitsa was censured for his marriage by the Serres committee, which declared his action to be "a bad principle and incompatible with the morals and customs of the country, and impossible under the conditions of our revolutionary life". The committee also expelled Panitsa's wife from the Serres region. After discovering Daev's letter where there was a conspiracy against Sandanski, Panitsa revealed it to Sandanski. Panitsa was originally assigned by Boris Sarafov to assassinate Sandanski, however Panitsa remained loyal to Sandanski. On October 10, 1907, the Serres committee sentenced Boris Sarafov, Ivan Garvanov and Mihail Daev to death. After Daev's death, the committee assigned Panitsa to assassinate Sarafov and Garvanov, organizing their assassinations. Panitsa went to Sofia and established contact with IMRO's right-wing, pretending that he was disillusioned with Sandanski. Panitsa assassinated Sarafov and Garvanov at Sarafov's house in Sofia on November 28, 1907, both on orders from Sandanski. Panitsa managed to escape with the help of relatives and associates. The assassination deepened the differences inside IMRO, leading to Sandanski being sentenced to death and the final disintegration of IMRO through a conflict between the right-wing and the left-wing.

During the Young Turk Revolution, together with Sandanski, he cooperated with the Young Turks. After the revolution, he became a member of a left-wing political party in the Ottoman Empire - People's Federative Party (Bulgarian Section). Panitsa led IMRO volunteer corps, which joined the Salonica Expedition Army in suppressing the 1909 revolt against the Young Turk Revolution. Panitsa was a socialist and considered his compatriots as Bulgarians.

During the Balkan Wars, he was part of the Macedonian-Adrianopolitan Volunteer Corps. Panitsa supported the Bulgarian Army's operations in eastern Macedonia then. Panitsa later performed intelligence activity for the Bulgarian army in the area of the city of Drama. During the First World War, he was wounded in the battles of the Bulgarian army against the French in Krivolak. In March 1917, the Panagia Eikosifoinissa Monastery was attacked and plundered by a paramilitary group led by him and under the guidance of Czech journalist Vladimir Sis. Panitsa later performed police functions for the Bulgarian army in the area of the city of Serres. After the war, Panitsa became a leader of the left-wing (federalist) faction of IMRO. In December 1921, left-leaning deserters formed the Macedonian Federative Organization, in which Panitsa was active. The Bulgarian minister of defense Aleksandar Dimitrov started a campaign against the IMRO after his visit to Belgrade in May 1921. Dimitrov decided upon an anti-IMRO guerrilla movement, entrusting the job to Panitsa and other federalists. In October 1921, Dimitrov was assassinated by the IMRO. Panitsa's federalists, with the assistance of the Bulgarian government, set out to destroy the IMRO, but in the ensuing clashes the federalists were scattered by IMRO. The federalists were defeated by IMRO in Nevrokop, from which Panitsa had to flee.

After the defeat of the Communist uprising of September 1923 in Bulgaria, the new government repressed leftist Macedonian organizations aided by the IMRO. The fleeing federalists placed themselves in Yugoslav service, joining the Association against Bulgarian Bandits. Panitsa, who had moved meanwhile from Greece to Belgrade, served as advisor of this Association. Later he went to Vienna, where the rest of the federalist leadership was reassembled, seeking foreign contacts. Per Russian author Anatoly Valentinovich Dienko, Panitsa became an agent of the Soviet intelligence and an associate of the Military Department of the Bulgarian Communist Party (BCP). In Vienna, he assisted the leftist Dimitar Vlahov.

He went secretly to Greece in 1924 and discussed with Greek communist leaders the possibility of receiving logistical support and shelter behind the Greek border in the case a coup was organized by the IMRO and the Communist Party of Greece against Aleksandar Tsankov's government. In 1924, as a member of the Macedonian Federative Organization's leadership, he participated in the drafting of the May Manifesto, as well as in the negotiations. The agreement was reached with the IMRO. The revelation that IMRO, a Bulgarian nationalist organization, officially sanctioned such a separatist and communist-influenced document, caused uproar in its ranks. Aleksandar Protogerov and Todor Aleksandrov revoked their signatures to the agreement. In 1925, Panitsa lived with his wife and their son in Vienna. He was posing as a Serbian merchant under the name Dimitri Arnautović. IMRO then labeled Panitsa as a servant of foreign interests and sentenced him to death. On May 8, 1925, while he was at the Burgtheater in Vienna, during the last act of the play Peer Gynt, he was shot and killed by Mencha Karnicheva, an activist of the IMRO's right wing in Vienna. Karnicheva told police that she committed the murder in revenge for Panitsa's role in the executions of dissidents.

=== Legacy ===
He was buried in the Serbian section of the Vienna Central Cemetery on May 15, 1925. His son Kosta became a doctor and died in 1948. The right to the usage of Panitsa's grave expired in 1991 and an ex mark was placed on it. His gravestone was recovered by three Macedonians and donated to the Museum of the Republic of North Macedonia in February 2023. A monument honoring him is in his hometown.
