= Dimitar Vlahov =

Politician from Ottoman Macedonia (1878–1953)

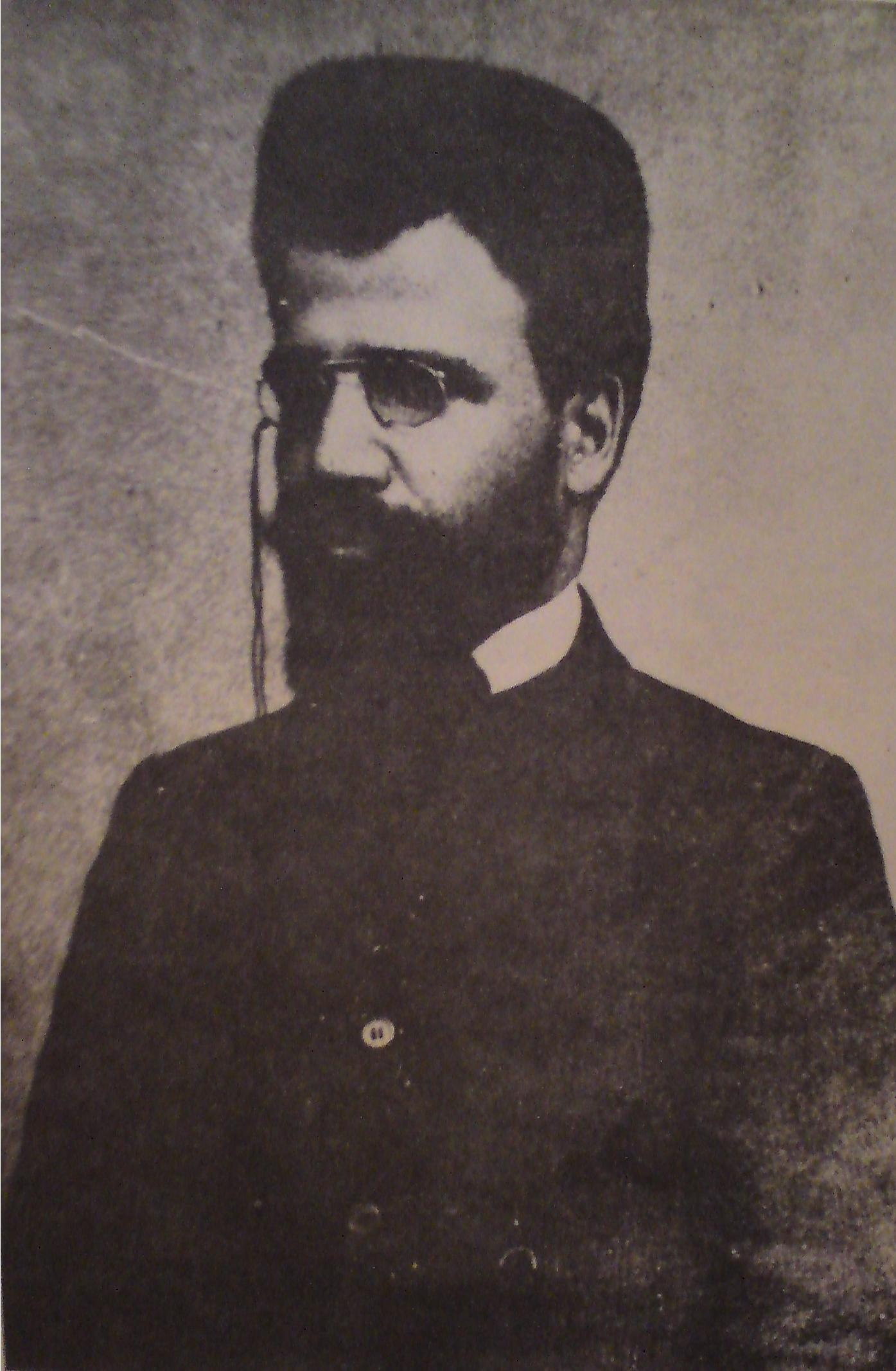
- Vlahov c. 1908

Member of the Ottoman Parliament
- In office August 1908 – January 1912

Personal details
- Born: 8 November 1878 Kukush, Salonica Vilayet, Ottoman Empire (now Greece)
- Died: 7 April 1953 (aged 74) Belgrade, FPR Yugoslavia (now Serbia)
- Citizenship: Ottoman, Bulgarian, Yugoslav
- Party: People's Federative Party (Bulgarian Section)
- Education: Sofia University

Dimitar Vlahov (Bulgarian: Димитър Влахов; Macedonian: Димитар Влахов; 8 November 1878 – 7 April 1953) was a politician, communist activist and member of the left wing of the Internal Macedonian Revolutionary Organization (IMRO) from the region of Macedonia. Vlahov was a member of the Ottoman Parliament, as well as a member and co-founder of People's Federative Party (Bulgarian Section). He was a co-founder and leader of IMRO (United). After World War II, he took part in the government of the newly established SR Macedonia and SFR Yugoslavia. In 1946, he lost his political influence.

== Life ==
=== Early life ===
He was born on 8 November 1878 in Kılkış (Bulgarian/Macedonian Kukush/Kukuš), Ottoman Empire (present-day Greece). Vlahov attended the Bulgarian Men's High School of Thessaloniki. He also studied chemistry in Germany and Switzerland, where he also took part in socialist circles. However, he graduated in these subjects in Sofia University in 1903. He became a member of the Bulgarian Workers' Social Democratic Party. In the academic year 1903/1904, he was a teacher at the Bulgarian Men's High School of Thessaloniki and a co-opted member of the Central Committee of the Internal Macedonian Revolutionary Organization (IMRO). After the Ilinden Uprising in 1903, he was briefly detained by the Ottoman authorities.

=== Young Turk Revolution and aftermath ===
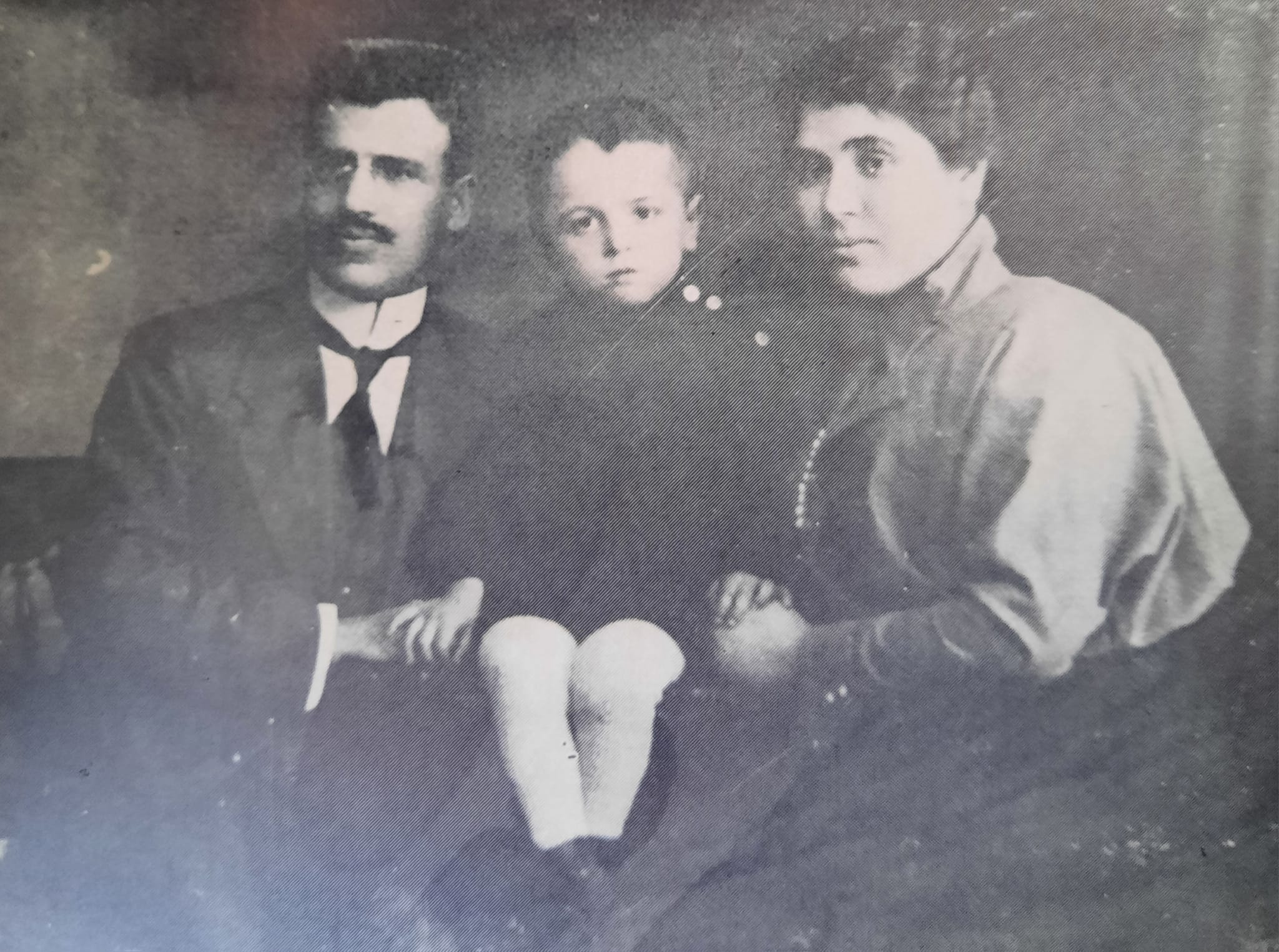
Dimitar, Maria Vlahova, Gustav Vlahov in Sofia, 1916.

IMRO leftists and him supported the Young Turks in their revolution in July 1908 and ended up forming their own party, the People's Federative Party (Bulgarian Section), "in the hope of gaining equality within the Ottoman state" and with the goal "to unite all of Macedonia's nationalities", with Vlahov elected as a deputy in the Ottoman Parliament in August 1908 as a representative of the People's Federative Party (PFP). He had criticized the anti-labor policies of the Unionists in the Parliament. After the Young Turk Revolution, he edited the newspaper Unity. During the Albanian revolt of 1910, he submitted to the Parliament a memorandum with the list of all the atrocities committed by the Turks in Macedonia, along with fellow deputies Hristo Dalchev and Todor Pavlov. Along with Dalchev, despite being elected to parliament with the support of Yane Sandanski and IMRO's left-wing, he began to defend the Bulgarian national cause in Macedonia and came into conflict with Sandanski. Vlahov also opposed Sandanski's revolutionary tactics and favored cooperation with the ruling Young Turks, seeing it as necessary for the party's survival. He was criticized by party's members because of his lack of activity in resolving the national question. Vlahov was elected president of the PFP's triumvirate and held this position until the dissolution of the party in 1910. After the dissolution of this party, he became a member of the Ottoman Socialist Party.

Since 1911 he had been a member of the Thessaloniki Socialist Federation, president of the First Congress of Tobacco Workers in Macedonia, and the Kukush district elected him a member of the Thessaloniki Provincial Council in 1912. He remained a member of the Ottoman Parliament until January 1912. After the Second Balkan War, Greek authorities exiled him to Bulgaria in 1913. He worked as a Bulgarian consul in Odessa in 1914–1915. As the consul, he financially assisted the publication of the magazine Balkan Voice, which propagated the idea of unification of Macedonia with Bulgaria. During the First World War, in 1916, he was appointed governor of the Prishtina district, then under Bulgarian rule. He was sent to Istanbul, Kiev, and Odessa as an envoy of the Bulgarian Army Directorate for Economic Affairs and Planning afterwards. When IMRO was re-established in 1920, Vlahov was elected as an alternate member of its Central Committee, representing the left-wing. He also became the secretary of the Chamber of Commerce and Industry in Varna in the same year, serving until 1923.

=== Interwar period ===
From early 1924 until May 1924 there was an attempt to bring the two factions of the IMRO together, the leftist (federalist) and the right-wing (centralist) faction. IMRO leader Todor Aleksandrov was unhappy with the Bulgarian government and thus approached the Communist International (Comintern). In negotiations with representatives of the Soviet Union, Aleksandrov included Vlahov, calling him from Varna, counting on his contacts with Bolsheviks and with Christian Rakovsky (Vlahov's best man). After several meetings with representatives of the Soviet Union in Bulgaria, an agreement was reached for the IMRO to send its delegation to the Soviet Union and to continue the negotiations with the Soviet Union and the Comintern to obtain political and diplomatic support for resolving the Macedonian Question. Aleksandrov designated Vlahov as a member of the IMRO delegation and they went to Moscow in June 1923. There were further negotiations in Vienna. A common ground was the goal of a reunited independent federalist state of Macedonia within a Balkan Federation. A draft was prepared by him and Nikola Kharlakov, a member of the Bulgarian Communist Party (BCP). The draft was corrected and revised by IMRO's Central Committee, resulting in the secret document May Manifesto, signed on 6 May 1924 by the three members of the IMRO's Central Committee - Petar Chaulev, Aleksandar Protogerov and Todor Aleksandrov. In June, Aleksandrov denounced the agreement and told Vlahov not to publish it. However, Vlahov refused and published the document in the newspaper La Fédération Balkanique a month later. The turmoil caused by this publication led to Aleksandrov's assassination in August. The signatories and other left-wing activists were later assassinated. Due to the failure of the agreement, Vlahov was removed from his position in the Bulgarian diplomatic service. Afterwards, he lived in Austria as a political émigré and was active as a Comintern delegate to the Balkans.

In 1925, he was one of the founders and leaders of IMRO (United) in Vienna, which was mostly a creation by the Comintern. Vlahov was a member of the communist wing of IMRO (United). He also became a member of the BCP in 1926. In La Fédération Balkanique on 1 April 1926, Vlahov expressed the willingness of IMRO (United) to work with "persons of all social classes without distinction of nationality, citizenship, religion or sex". He also edited IMRO (United)'s newspaper Makedonsko delo (Macedonian Cause). Vlahov was a founding member of the Macedonian Scientific Institute. In 1930, the newspaper La Fédération Balkanique, which was edited by him, criticized the theory about the ethnicity of the Macedonian Slavs by Serbian geographer Jovan Cvijić and viewed the majority of the Macedonian population as Bulgarian. In 1932 members of IMRO (United) put for the first time the issue of the recognition of a separate Macedonian nation in a lecture in Moscow. In the 1920s Vlahov, as well as the IMRO (United), had referred to the Macedonian Slavs as Bulgarians, but by the 1930s, his views changed and he recognized a separate Macedonian ethnicity, based on the Marxist theories on nationhood, as a product of the advent of capitalism to Macedonia in the 19th century. Vlahov had identified himself as a Macedonian Bulgarian. The question was also studied in the highest institutions of the Comintern and in 1933, Vlahov arrived in Moscow and took part in a number of meetings related to the Macedonian Question and the recognition of a Macedonian nation. The wording of the 1934 Comintern resolution was apparently formulated by a Polish communist who had little knowledge of the Macedonian Question and Vlahov assisted him. Thus on 11 January 1934, the Political Secretariat of the Comintern adopted a special Resolution on the Macedonian Question in which the existence of a separate Macedonian nation was recognized. Vlahov accepted the decision without a reaction and his intervention seemed key in the adoption of this resolution, since it is uncertain if the Comintern had a clear perspective of the identity issues in Macedonia. According to historian Elisabeth Barker, due to this reason, there was widespread belief that he was a communist agent. However, Vlahov wrote in his memoirs the decision had come "from above" and was controversial, and that it was not received well by local activists in Vardar Macedonia. Per him, the national emancipation of the left-leaning and communist Macedonian activists shaped the formulation approved by the Comintern. Vlahov managed to escape several assassination attempts before moving to the Soviet Union in 1936. During the Great Purge, he was arrested by the Soviet secret police on 23 February 1938, suspected of being in contact with people who spy for Bulgaria and being a spy for Bulgaria himself. He was released after being imprisoned for one month with the intervention of Bulgarian communists Georgi Dimitrov and Vasil Kolarov.

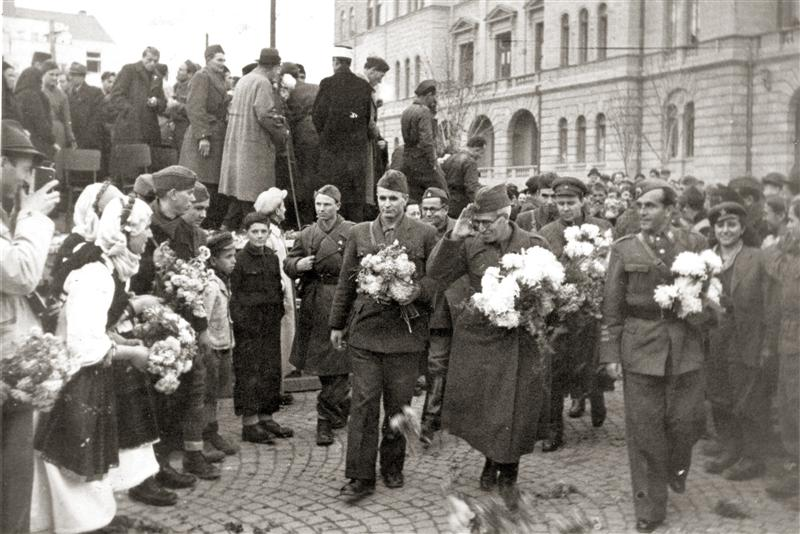
Metodija Andonov-Čento, Dimitar Vlahov and Mihajlo Apostolski parading in liberated Skopje, November 1944.

=== World War II and aftermath ===
During World War II, he participated in All-Slav Congresses in Moscow as a "Macedonian publicist". In 1941, he disseminated Soviet war propaganda to the Balkans, especially Greece. On 29 November 1943, Vlahov was listed as a participant in the Second Session of the Anti-Fascist Council for the National Liberation of Yugoslavia (where it was decided that Macedonia would be a constituent republic of federal Yugoslavia) in Jajce, although he did not participate as he was in Moscow. He was also elected in the presidium representing Greek Macedonia, along with his old associate Vladimir Poptomov representing Bulgarian Macedonia, without the prior knowledge and approval of Soviet Union. BCP's General Secretary Georgi Dimitrov protested to both Joseph Stalin and Josip Broz Tito against the elections of Vlahov and Poptomov, because Vlahov was "an émigré lacking any connections with Yugoslav Macedonia", with both him and Poptomov known in Bulgaria as "Bulgarian communists". In response, Vlahov sent a letter of protest to Dimitrov, emphasizing his efforts for the liberation of Macedonia, while also claiming that in Vardar Macedonia 20 percent had Bulgarian national consciousness, 40 percent had "pure Macedonian consciousness" and 40 percent did not have a fully developed Macedonian consciousness. Tito refused to comply with Dimitrov's request. Despite his position, throughout the war, at AVNOJ's headquarters, he remained as a nominal and powerless Macedonian representative. According to Samuil Bernstein, who attended a conference of the Slavic Commission of the Academy of Sciences of the Soviet Union during the war, Vlahov reported in the conference that "the Slavic population of Macedonia is Bulgarian, and its history is an organic part of the history of Bulgaria, but in the 19th century the process of separating the Macedonians into an independent nation began."

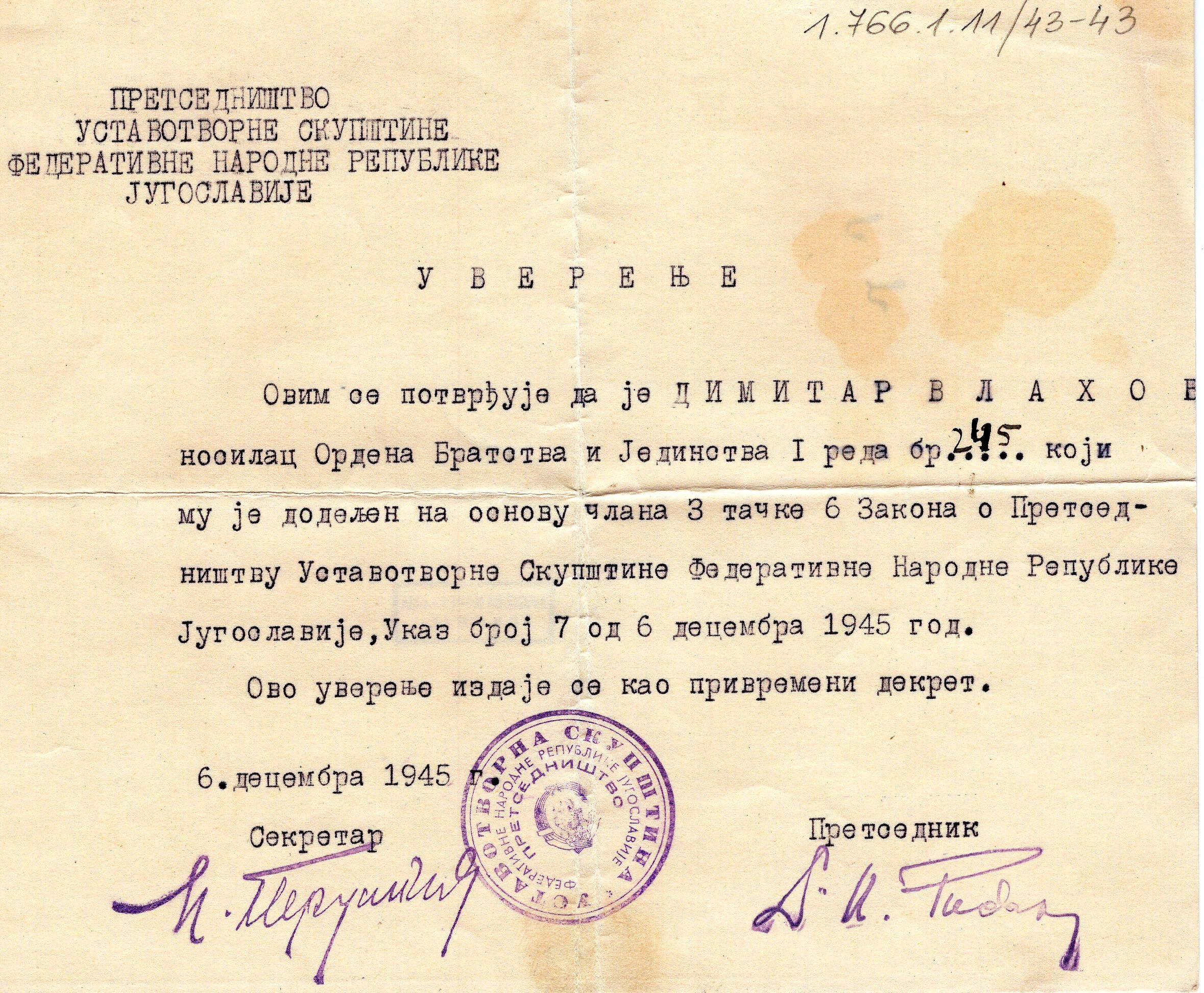
Certificate from the Presidium of the National Assembly of the FPR Yugoslavia awarding Vlahov the Order of the Brotherhood and Unity.

On 5 October 1944, he left Moscow with his son Gustav and through Craiova they reached Belgrade and then Vardar Macedonia. Upon his return, Vlahov became a member of the Communist Party of Yugoslavia (CPY) and Communist Party of Macedonia in the same year. He was a delegate in the Anti-fascist Assembly for the National Liberation of Macedonia and a member of its presidium. Vlahov supported the concept of a United Macedonia, due to which he came into a conflict with the pro-Yugoslav majority, which wanted to incorporate Vardar Macedonia into Yugoslavia. In late February 1945, Yugoslav leader Josip Broz Tito summoned him, Pavel Shatev, Metodija Andonov-Čento and Mihailo Apostolski for a meeting to try to dissuade demands for immediate action against Greece, although he also still had his own ambitions regarding northern Greece then. Due to his irredentist views, Tito transferred him to Belgrade so that he cannot regain his political influence. He was a member-advisor of the Yugoslav delegation in the Paris Peace Conference and became the vice president of the Yugoslav Federal National Assembly in 1946. Vlahov remained outside of Tito's inner circle because of being older than his peers, communicating better in Bulgarian, French, and Russian than in any of the Yugoslav languages, including Macedonian, as well as for having no political support in Yugoslavia and SR Macedonia. As a result, he remained as a token Macedonian representative in Belgrade, holding virtually powerless positions until his death on 7 April 1953. Per historians Ivan Katardžiev and Stefan Dechev, he continued regarding himself as a Bulgarian until the end of his life and only espoused Macedonian political separatism, along with members of IMRO (United).

== Works and views ==
He wanted the democratization of the Ottoman Empire. During the Ottoman period, he supported Macedonian autonomy within the framework of the empire. According to historian Alexander Maxwell, Vlahov and the Comintern promoted Macedonian ethnic distinction in the early 1930s to advance socialist internationalism. However, Vlahov's view did not represent popular opinion in Macedonia, nor the consensus of the Macedonian diaspora.

In 1947, the book Speeches and Articles, written by him, was published by the State Publishing House of Skopje. Throughout the book, Vlahov praised the CPY for recognizing the existence of the Macedonian nation. He also wrote about the "political genius of Marshal Tito" who managed to create a country based on the "principle of equality" of its peoples, and on their "brotherhood and unity", neglecting that CPY was not the only communist party to recognize the Macedonian nation, nor did the concept of brotherhood and unity inspire all the Yugoslavs. Per historian Dimitris Livanios, the purpose of the book was to indoctrinate and educate the population in the tone of Macedonianism. He also provided an outline of Macedonian history where he stressed the national individuality of the Macedonians, despite the "cultural yoke" imposed by Greeks, Serbs, and Bulgarians. Vlahov also examined the history of the IMRO and the development of the Macedonian Question from the late 19th century onwards. According to Vlahov, the Macedonians are a separate ethnicity because they live in a common territory (describing it as "Macedonia within our geographical borders"), live under common economic conditions, have a common culture, and have a common language. In two letters to Lazar Koliševski from 1948 and 1951, Vlahov opposed the development of the Macedonian ethnicity on an anti-Bulgarian ground and refuted Koliševski's accusations that IMRO (United) was a pro-Bulgarian organization. This fact is indicative of the complexity of the national processes in SR Macedonia during this period.

Vlahov also wrote that the Macedonians had participated with the Bulgarians historically in common causes. In the preface of his 1950 book Macedonia: Moments in the History of the Macedonian People, Vlahov condemned what he perceived as the Greater Bulgarian chauvinism's falsification of Macedonian history. He also claimed that modern Macedonians came from a fusion of Slavs with the ancient Macedonians, that Samuel of Bulgaria's empire was a Macedonian state, and that Cyril and Methodius were Macedonians' gift to Slavism. His memoirs (published in 1970) covered the history of Balkan socialism since the end of the 19th century but emphasize events after the Young Turk Revolution. He characterized the policies and behavior of the IMRO centralists as a class struggle of oppressed land workers against the oppressive Ottoman landowners. Vlahov regarded the Supremists as an instrument of the Bulgarian government and court which disregarded the "genuine, autochthonous movement aimed at the self-determination of the Macedonians."

== Legacy ==
In the original version of the song Today over Macedonia from 1941, his name was mentioned in the lyrics. At the end of the war, it was utilized as the regional anthem of the Socialist Republic of Macedonia, but during the Informbiro period, his name was removed from the lyrics. Vlahov's memoirs were published in Skopje in 1970. Gustav Vlahov worked as a secretary to Tito, deputy foreign minister and as a Yugoslav ambassador. In North Macedonia, he is regarded as an ethnic Macedonian, while in Bulgaria he is considered as a Bulgarian renegade. Macedonian historians have emphasized the particularity of the IMRO's left-wing and they refer to the actions by him and other leftists in an attempt to demonstrate the existence of Macedonian ethnicity or at least proto-ethnicity within a part of the local revolutionary movement at his time.
