= Independent Macedonia =

Independent Macedonia may refer to:

- North Macedonia, a country in Southeastern Europe, independent since 1991
- Macedonian nationalism, an ideology associated with the will for national independence of the Macedonian ethnic group
- Independent Macedonia (IMRO), a concept developed by the Internal Macedonian Revolutionary Organization during the interwar period (1918–1939)
- Independent Macedonia (1944), a proposed puppet state of Nazi Germany in present-day North Macedonia
- Independent Macedonia (sport hall), a multi-sports arena in Skopje, North Macedonia

== See also ==
- Macedonia (disambiguation)
- Macedonia (region) for the wider area
- Macedonian Struggle (ca. 1893-1908), the conflict for the independence of the wider Macedonian region from the Ottoman Empire
- Autonomy for Macedonia and Adrianople regions, a related political concept in Ottoman Macedonia
