= Independent Macedonia (IMRO) =

Conceptual project by the Internal Macedonian Revolutionary Organization

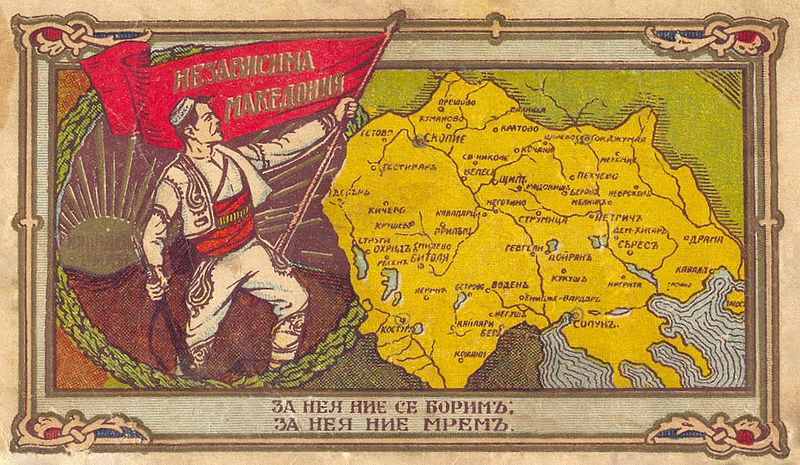
Postcard issued by Ilinden during 1920s in Sofia, presenting their concept of Independent Macedonia.

Independent Macedonia was a conceptual project of the Internal Macedonian Revolutionary Organization (IMRO) to create an independent Macedonia, during the interwar period.

== History ==
=== Prelude ===
The predecessor of the concept of Independent Macedonia appeared initially in the late 19th century as variant called autonomous Macedonia in the documents of the Internal Macedonian-Adrianople Revolutionary Organization. The organization was founded in 1893 in Ottoman Thessaloniki by a small band of anti-Ottoman Macedono-Bulgarian revolutionaries. The idea then was strictly political and did not imply a secession from Bulgarian ethnicity, but unity of all nationalities in the area, then under Ottoman control. During the Balkan Wars and the First World War the organization supported the Bulgarian army and joined to Bulgarian war-time authorities when they temporarily took control over mosts of Thrace and Macedonia. In this period autonomism as a political tactic was abandoned and annexationist positions were supported, aiming eventual incorporation of occupied areas into Bulgaria. However Bulgaria lost the Wars. The left-wing of IMRO formed the Temporary representation of the former United Internal Revolutionary Organization in 1919, which demanded autonomy of Macedonia as a part of a future Balkan Federation at the Paris Peace Conference.

=== IMRO ===
In the aftermath of World War I, the IMRO developed an agenda for an autonomous or even independent Macedonia, on the territories of Greece, Yugoslavia and Bulgaria, under the protectorate of the Great Powers, that meant in fact a second Bulgarian state on the Balkans. It accepted this concept with the aim to annex the territories occupied by Serbia and Greece. IMRO then had de facto full control of Pirin Macedonia (Bulgarian part), which it used as a base for hit and run attacks against Yugoslavia and Greece. It acted as a "state within a state", with the unofficial support of the right-wing Bulgarian governments. Ivan Mihailov and Aleksandar Protogerov, who assumed IMRO's leadership after Todor Alexandrov's death in 1924, changed the main task for an autonomous Macedonian state, but officially under Bulgarian control, as it was a way for a subsequent unification with Bulgaria.

By 1928, after the assassination of Protogerov, Mihailov proposed a new plan calling for unification of a pre-1913 Macedonia region into a single state, that would be independent from Bulgaria. It should be with prevailing ethnic Bulgarian element. However the new state would to be supranational and cantonized, something as "Switzerland on the Balkans". Nevertheless, the IMRO continued to support Bulgarian irredentism. It had close ties to diaspora organizations abroad, the most important of which was the Macedonian Patriotic Organization in the United States and Canada. The organization was suppressed by the Bulgarian army after the 1934 Military coup.

=== IMRO (United) ===
The Comintern policy on the Macedonian question rose the slogan of a united and independent Macedonia at the 5th Conference of the Balkan Communist Federation in 1923. After the failure of the May Manifesto signed in 1924 by the leadership of the IMRO, which maintained the independence and unification of the region of Macedonia, and cooperation with the Soviet Union, some left-wing revolutionaries of the IMRO founded the so-called IMRO (United) in 1925 in Vienna. Its main objective was to free the region of Macedonia, and to create a new political entity which would become an equal member of the future Balkan Communist Federation. IMRO (United) was sponsored directly by the Comintern, maintaining close links with its Bulgarian leader Georgi Dimitrov. In 1934 the Comintern in cooperation with IMRO (United), issued the Resolution of the Comintern on the Macedonian Question, in which for the first time, an international organization has recognized the existence of a separate Macedonian nation and language. However the IMRO (United), was not particularly influential on the revolutionary movement in the region. Prior to the Second World War, thеsе views on the Macedonian question have been of little practical importance.

=== WWII development ===
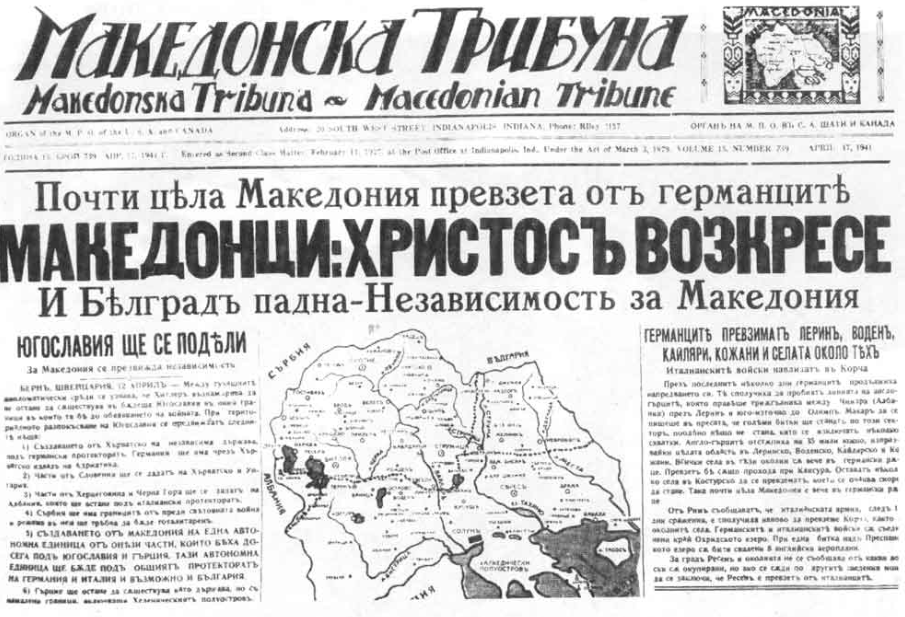
Macedonian Tribune newspaper issue from Easter, 17 April 1941. The Macedonian Patriotic Organization then, greeted the Axis' invasion on the Balkans as a liberation. Headline reads: Macedonians: Christ is risen. Belgrade has fallen. Independence for Macedonia.

As the Bulgarian army as part from Axis-powers entered Yugoslav and Greek Macedonia during WWII in April 1941, former IMRO members were active in organising Bulgarian Action Committees, charged with taking over the local authorities. During the War in Yugoslav Macedonia the Macedonian national ideas were supported by the Macedonian Partisans, who strengthened their positions. After Bulgaria switched sides in September 1944, some former IMRO activists tried to create an independent Macedonian state. The state had to have a Bulgarian character. It would be placed under the protectorate of the Third Reich, but they failed. In the late 1944, this state was dissolved and the communist SR Macedonia, which was proclaimed in August by the ASNOM, became operational and later was incorporated in Communist Yugoslavia. The local high-ranking politician Metodija Andonov-Čento, who tried to create a fully independent Macedonia, was charged of being supporter of pro-Bulgarian ideas, and was sentenced to eleven years in prison under forced labor.

=== Modern ===
During the breakup of Yugoslavia several activists had agreed to make a party for a future independent Macedonia. By these circumstances the IMRO–DPMNE party was founded in 1990 in Skopje. In this way an independence referendum was held in the Socialist Republic of Macedonia on 8 September 1991, that was approved by 96.4% of votes. According to some observers, 8 September was chosen as the date for the referendum to link it with the 8 September 1944 proclamation of the Independent State of Macedonia. On January 15, 1992, Bulgaria was the first country to recognize the independence of the new state.

== See also ==
- United Macedonia
- Autonomy for Macedonia and Adrianople regions
- Independent Macedonia (1944)
