= Mencha Karnicheva =

Macedonian revolutionary (1900–1964)

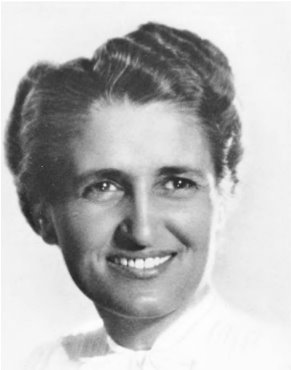
Mencha Karnicheva

Melpomena Dimitrova Karnicheva (Bulgarian: Мелпомена Димитрова Кърничева; Macedonian: Мелпомена Димитрова Крничева; 16 March 1900 – 1964), commonly known as Mencha Karnicheva, was a revolutionary of the Internal Macedonian Revolutionary Organization (IMRO). The wife of IMRO leader Ivan Mihaylov, she is known for assassinating IMRO left-wing activist Todor Panitsa.

== Life ==
Karnicheva was born on 16 March 1900 in Kruševo in Ottoman-ruled Macedonia (today in North Macedonia) to a mixed Aromanian family. Her grandmother was of Bulgarian and Aromanian ancestry, while her great-grandfather was a Bulgarian priest, who got killed by the Turks. During the Ilinden–Preobrazhenie Uprising in 1903, Ottoman troops sacked her birthplace, she and her family moved to Sofia, Bulgaria, after the uprising. There she became involved with the Macedonian revolutionary movement. On 2 September 1918, she went to study in Munich, but returned to Bulgaria after the end of World War I.

Karnicheva was briefly part of IMRO's federalist leader Todor Panitsa's circle, but disagreed with his political views. She joined IMRO on 15 March 1924. On 8 May 1925, she assassinated Panitsa in Vienna's Burgtheater. Per Mihaylov, the assassination was widely publicized in the international press. She was tried and sentenced to eight years in prison, but due to her bad health, her sentence was terminated by an Austrian court and she returned to Bulgaria. In Bulgaria, she was welcomed as a hero upon her return. On 25 December 1926, she married Mihaylov, who was then a leader of IMRO. Along with Mara Buneva, she was also celebrated as a hero by IMRO's circles in Yugoslavia, Bulgaria and the Macedonian emigration. After the disbandment of IMRO in 1934, she lived with Mihaylov in exile in Turkey, Poland, Hungary, Croatia etc, until her death in Rome, Italy, in 1964.

She was not part of Bulgarian national martyrology until the end of the Bulgarian communist regime. Bulgarian nationalists and the Bulgarian public celebrate her as a patriot. A female association of VMRO-BND was named after her, along with a street in Blagoevgrad.
