= May Manifesto =

The "May Manifesto" of May 6, 1924 was a manifesto in which the objectives of the unified Macedonian liberation movement were presented: independence and unification of partitioned region of Macedonia, fighting all the neighbouring Balkan monarchies, supporting the Balkan Communist Federation and cooperation with the Soviet Union.

The May Manifesto published in the Ilinden newspaper in Sofia

== Macedonian question and Balkan Communist Federation ==
In 1919, the Balkan Communist Federation was established as an umbrella group for the various Balkan communist parties and had the official endorsement of the Soviets. Its first meeting was called in Sofia to promote Bulgarian communists Macedonian Question policy. It was heavily influenced by the policy of the Bulgarian Communist Party (BCP), which had the strongest following of either the Greek or Yugoslavian parties. The BCP agenda was endorsed by the Soviets, who felt it best served their goals of spreading communism in the Balkans. They felt the Bulgarians were the most revolutionary in desiring an overthrow of the First World War peace settlements enforced by the national bourgeois establishment of the Balkan states. They could also play the 'Macedonian card' as a source for revolution. Macedonia was used by the Balkan communists as a rallying point to overthrow the existing social and political order. For the communists, Macedonia was to be a political entity of various nationalities. The BCP took full advantage of this bias.

== Internal Macedonian Revolutionary Organization's factions ==
To further its goals, the BCP enlisted the support of leftist former activists in Internal Macedonian-Adrianople Revolutionary Organization (IMARO), who espoused pro-Balkan Federation views. In 1918 they outlined their policy in a manifesto, its main points being the restoration of Macedonia to its original geographical boundaries. In 1919 they formed the Temporary representation of the former United Internal Revolutionary Organization and later in 1921 the Macedonian Federative Organization (known as the "Federalists"). The Federalists were supported by the Bulgarian government of Aleksandar Stamboliyski. Their policy led them into open confrontation with the right-wing faction of the Internal Macedonian Revolutionary Organization (IMRO). At the Balkan Communist Conference in Vienna in May 1922, the Bulgarian delegate Vasil Kolarov first raised the issue of Macedonian and Thracian autonomy. Knowing the proposal was a threat to their countries borders, the Greek and Yugoslav delegates were unable to endorse it at this stage; however, in order for any chance of success, the communists needed the support of the IMRO. In June 1923, the IMRO collaborated with a nationalist military clique and overthrew the Bulgarian government of Aleksandar Stamboliyski and assassinated him. The new premier, Alexandar Tsankov, released the imprisoned IMRO chiefs Todor Alexandrov and Alexander Protogerov who were arrested by the old regime as part of their IMRO crackdown agreement with Yugoslavia. The government was condemned by the Communist International, as well as the absent communist resistance to it. When the communists did try to revolt during the September Uprising, they were quickly crushed by the government and its IMRO allies. At the Sixth Conference of the Balkan Communist Federation in November 1923, Kolarov stated that the "Macedonian population wishes to be recognized as nationality, to obtain its own national rights." Before this the term nationality, likely implying ethnic difference, and the national rights reference were not used for the Macedonians by the BCP, thus this can be seen as a significant step toward recognition of Macedonian national identity. However, initially the use of terms such as nationality and nation had a good deal of uncertainty, since the BCP leaders referred to "Macedonian and Thracian nationalities" in plural. During the spring of 1924, at the sixth conference of the BCP, they unveiled their Macedonian resolution, which stated that an autonomous Macedonia can “assure right and liberty to all its nationalities”, and hails the “Macedonian Revolutionary Organization, the real leader of the Macedonian slaves". Macedonian autonomy was portrayed in light of a class struggle of its inhabitants against the oppression of the middle class of the occupier countries, not an ethnic struggle.

== Signing and contents of the Manifesto ==
Continuing into 1924, the secret negotiations between the Federalists, BCP and IMRO representatives were conducted to unite all groups under the same goal: the independence or autonomy of a Macedonian state. In April 1924, IMRO leaders Alexandrov, Protogerov and Petar Chaulev issued a new declaration about the new orientation of the Macedonian Revolutionary Movement. The May Manifesto was signed on May 6, 1924 in Vienna by the IMRO leaders and following representatives, Filip Atanasov of the Federalists, Nikola Haraklov of the BCP and Solomon Goldstein of the Comintern. The May Manifesto called for the creation of a Macedonian state as a link between the Balkan peoples. The manifesto used solely the terms Macedonians, Macedonian population and Macedonian people, the last one is even marked as separate of the Bulgarian people. This communist-influenced document reads for a creation of a Macedonian state for the reasons of: "endowed with the most varied natural riches and a favorable climate; with its ethnically diverse population of upwards of 2,302,000 persons; with a strategic and economic position in the middle of the Balkans [...] has all the rights and conditions necessary for an independent political existence. Forming an independent and self governing state". Once again the IMRO explicitly stated Macedonia is multi-ethnic. It also declares its goal to be the "liberation and reunion of the separated parts of Macedonia in a fully autonomous and independent political unit within its natural geographic and ethnic frontiers". The new position of the IMRO was identical to that of the Balkan Communist Federation and won for the BCP the endorsement of its policy by the Comintern at its fifth congress that summer. The Congress considered the slogans formulated by the sixth Balkan Communist Federation Conference: "United Independent Macedonia" and "United Independent Thrace" wholly correct and truly revolutionary.

== Consequences ==
The revelation that the formerly pro-Bulgarian patriotic IMRO officially sanctioned such a separatist document caused uproar in its ranks as well as the Bulgarian government. It was first published in Dimitar Vlahov's communist-inspired magazine Federation Balcanique and later in Arseni Yovkov's newspaper Ilinden. The IMRO officially rejected its support of the document and its leaders even denied endorsing it. This did not spare them from the wrath of the Bulgarian government and the communists. In August 1924, IMRO chief Todor Alexandrov was assassinated. IMRO came under the leadership of Ivan Mihailov, who became a powerful figure in Bulgarian politics. While IMRO's leadership was quick to ascribe Alexandrov's murder to the communists and even quicker to organise a revenge action against the immediate perpetrators, there is some doubt that Mihailov himself might have been responsible for the murder. The result of the murder was further strife within the organisation and several high-profile murders, including those of Petar Chaulev in Milan and ultimately Protogetov himself. The IMRO led by Mihailov took actions against the left-wing assassinating ca. 35 activists, including Dimo Hadzhidimov and other members of the former Serres group, during the so-called Gorna Dzhumaya events from September 1924. Additionally Georgi Skrizhovski was killed in February 1925 and finally Todor Panitsa in Vienna in May 1925. As for Dimitar Vlahov, together with the survivors of Ivan Mihailov's purge, formed the IMRO (United) in 1925; a socialist offshoot which took the official communist line and supported Macedonian independence and after the 1934 Resolution of the Comintern which was made with the help of IMRO (United), they proclaimed Macedonian nationalism as their main cause. Meanwhile, in 1928 Mihailov proposed a new plan calling for unification of Macedonia region into a single state, that would be independent from Bulgaria, but should be with prevailing ethnic Bulgarian element. However the new state would to be supranational and cantonized, something as "Switzerland on the Balkans". Nevertheless, the IMRO was suppressed by the Bulgarian army after the 1934 Military coup.

== See also ==
- Macedonian Bulgarians
- Macedonian Question
- Macedonian nationalism
- United Macedonia
