= Vladimir Poptomov =

Bulgarian politician and diplomat (1890–1952)

- Владимир Поптомов
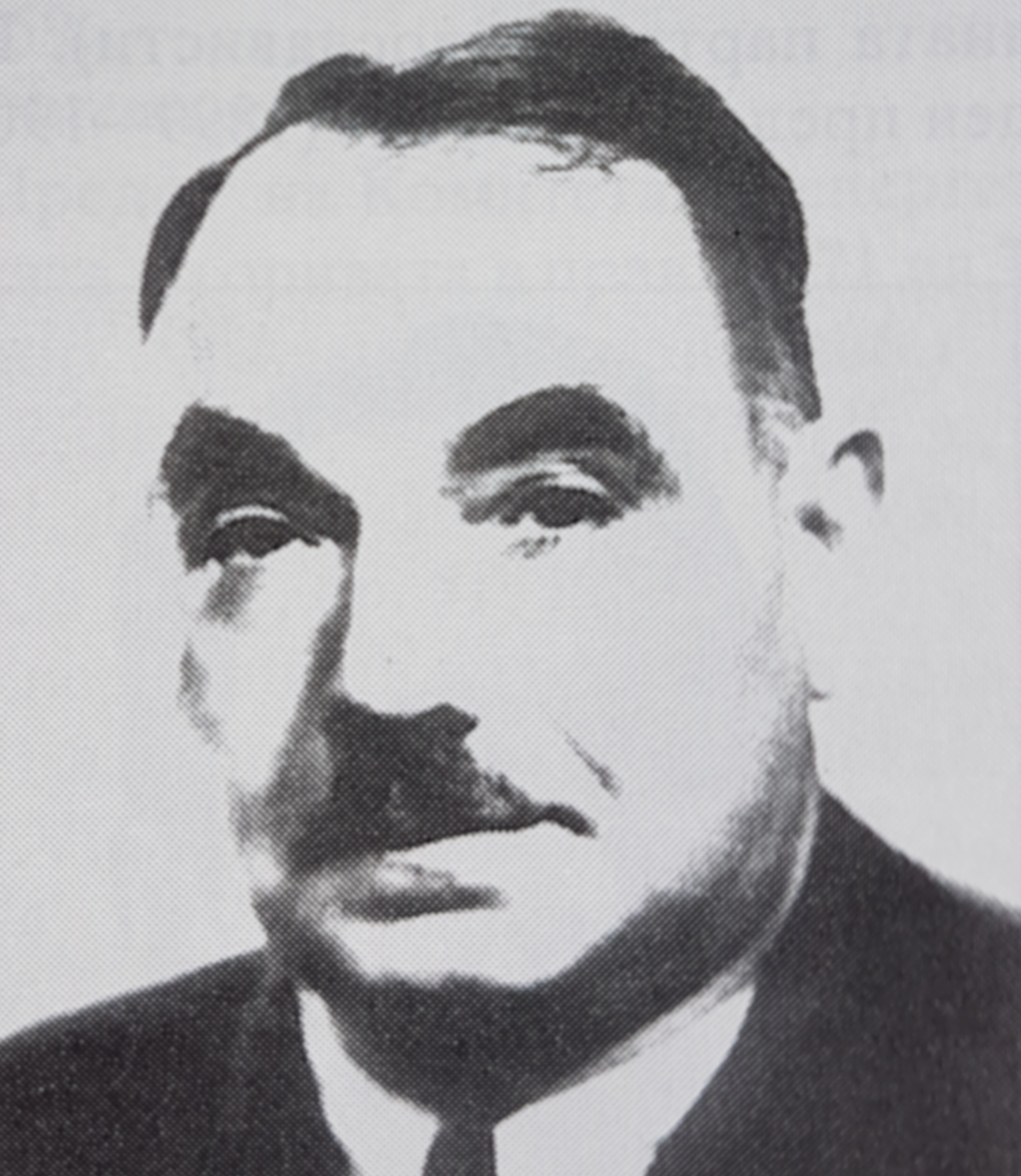

Minister of Foreign Affairs of Bulgaria
- In office 6 August 1949 – 27 May 1950
- Preceded by: Vasil Kolarov
- Succeeded by: Mincho Neychev

Personal details
- Born: Vladimir Poptomov Popliev; 8 February 1890 Belitsa, Ottoman Empire
- Died: 1 May 1952 (aged 62) Sofia, Bulgaria
- Party: Bulgarian Communist Party
- Education: Sofia University

Military service
- Rank: Lieutenant
- Unit: Bulgarian Army
- Battles/wars: First World War

Vladimir Tomov Poptomov (Bulgarian: Владимир Томов Поптомов; February 8, 1890, – May 1, 1952) was a Bulgarian politician and diplomat, prominent member of the Bulgarian Communist Party and statesman of the People's Republic of Bulgaria.

== Biography ==
Vladimir Poptomov was born as Vladimir Popiliev in February 1890 in the town of Belitsa, which at that time belonged to the Ottoman Empire. In 1911 he graduated from the pedagogical school in the city of Serres, after which he worked as a teacher in Bansko. Vladimir's father, Toma Popiliev, was a Bulgarian exarchate priest who for 15 years headed the Bulgarian church and school community and was one of the leaders of the Internal Macedonian Revolutionary Organization in Belitsa, killed by the Ottoman authorities. In 1912 he joined the Bulgarian Workers' Social Democratic Party. In 1914 he graduated from the School of Reserve Officers in Sofia and during the First World War he served as a junior lieutenant in the Bulgarian Army. After the war he entered the Sofia University in 1919 and graduated in 1922.

Poptomov took part in the leadership of the BKP in Petrich and Gorna Jumae, in 1920 he was elected a deputy. During the September Uprising of 1923, he led the actions of the insurgents in Razlog and, after the suppression of the uprising, emigrated to Yugoslavia; in 1924 he was sentenced to death in absentia. In 1925, Poptomov became one of the founders of the Internal Macedonian Revolutionary Organization (United) and became its political secretary, and until 1933 was the editor-in-chief of the newspaper Macedonian cause published on its behalf.

In 1934, Vladimir Poptomov went to Moscow, where he joined the All-Union Communist Party and worked in the Communist International. In 1936, a Bulgarian court sentenced in absentia to twelve years and six months in the process of IMRO.

After the coup on September 9, 1944, Poptomov returned to Bulgaria and became a member of the Politburo of the Central Committee of the BCP. From 1945 to 1949 he was editor-in-chief of the Rabotnichesko Delo newspaper, the official organ of the BCP. He became professor and the Sofia University in 1948. In 1948-1949 he worked as chief secretary at the National Council of the Fatherland Front. From August 1949 to May 1950, Poptomov served Minister of Foreign Affairs of Bulgaria and from January 1950 until his death in 1952 he was Deputy Chairman of the Council of Ministers.

Vladimir Poptomov died on May 1, 1952, in Sofia after suffering from a long illness.

Political offices
| Preceded by Vasil Kolarov | Minister of Foreign Affairs of Bulgaria; 1949–1950 | Succeeded by Mincho Neychev |
