= Resolution of the Comintern on the Macedonian question =

European political document

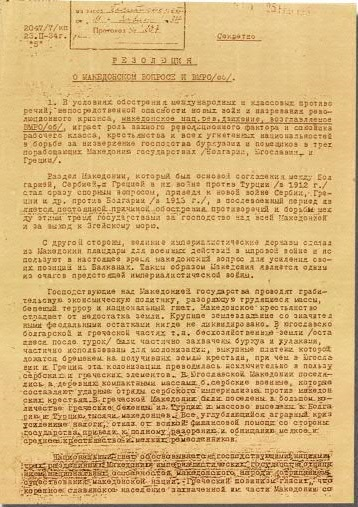
The first page of the resolution. The document is classified.

On January 11, 1934, the Communist International (Comintern) issued a resolution in which it recognized the existence of a separate Macedonian nation and Macedonian language. It was the first recognition of the Macedonian nation and language by an international organization.

== Background ==
At the end of World War I, there were few historians, ethnographers or linguists who claimed that a separate Macedonian nation and language existed. In the early 20th century, among the small number of Slavs in Ottoman Macedonia who had a national identity, for most, Bulgarian ethnic sentiments and regional Macedonian identity coexisted. However, for the majority of Macedonian Slavs, national identity was a political and flexible option imposed by the educational and religious propaganda, as seen by contemporary observers at the time. The partition of Ottoman Macedonia between Balkan nation-states after the conclusion of the Balkan Wars (1912–1913) and World War I (1914–1918) left the area divided mainly between Greece and Serbia (later Yugoslavia), while the smallest portion was acquired by Bulgaria. As a result, many Macedonians of Serbian Macedonia and Greek Macedonia were forced to emigrate to Bulgarian Macedonia. All of the countries pursued a policy of trying to assimilate the inherited population. Under Serbian rule in Vardar Macedonia, the locals faced with the policy of forced Serbianisation. The Greek governments also began a process of Hellenisation, promulgating a policy of persecution of the use of Slavic dialects both in public and in private, as well of expressions of any ethnic distinctiveness. In 1919 and 1927, population exchange agreements were signed and some of the Slavic-speaking population in Greece left for Bulgaria. In Vardar Macedonia amid the oppressive Serbianisation campaign, national consciousness seemed to be growing. At a meeting of the Communist International (Comintern) at Moscow in 1923, with the initiative of the Bulgarian communists Vasil Kolarov and Georgi Dimitrov, who were leading figures of the Comintern, the idea of an autonomous or independent Macedonia within a future communist Balkan Federation was adopted. The Communist Party of Yugoslavia (CPY) and the Communist Party of Greece (KKE) were frustrated with this decision. Former General Secretary of KKE, Marxist historian Yanis Kordatos condemned the decision as supporting "Bulgarian chauvinism". In 1924, the fifth session of the Comintern stated that there was a desire of the Macedonian people for the creation of "a united independent Macedonia".

== Resolution ==
In June 1931, the registrar of the Comintern Otto Kuusinen in his report on the national question to the executive committee, suggested that the main weakness of the Comintern was the insufficient appreciation of the national questions. Kuusinen called to discuss the national question in order to develop a new national program for each of the parties. Meanwhile, to the Balkan communist parties a directive was provided, for the gradual abandonment of the slogan of the Balkan Federation, highlighting in its foreground the "right of the distinct peoples of self-determination to a full separation". The reason for this political turning, was the rise of Nazism in Germany. Thus in 1932, members of the Comintern-sponsored IMRO (United), put for the first time the issue of the recognition of a separate Macedonian nation. In November 1932, the existence of a Macedonian nation and a Macedonian language were debated at international communist headquarters. By the end of 1933, IMRO (United) leaders almost unanimously decided that Macedonians were ethnonationally different from the Bulgarians.

On January 11, 1934, the Political Secretariat of the executive committee of the Comintern adopted its final decision on the Macedonian Question which was the recognition of the existence of a separate Macedonian nation and language. The decision was based on the activity of IMRO (United). The communists regarded the Macedonian Slavs as ethnically different from Bulgarians and Serbs. The Macedonian communists residing abroad, affiliated with the Bulgarian Communist Party (BCP), accepted the new stance. At the meeting where the resolution was adopted, some Bulgarian communists expressed concern that it would cause many left-wing Macedonian revolutionaries to switch to Ivan Mihailov's "fascist" and anti-communist Internal Macedonian Revolutionary Organisation.

IMRO (United) leader Dimitar Vlahov wrote:

I mentioned earlier that the Comintem itself wanted the Macedonian question to be considered at one of the consultations of its executive committee. One day I was informed that the consultation would be held. And so it was. Before the convening of the consultation, the inner leadership of the committee had already reached its stand, including the question of Macedonian nation, and charged the Balkan secretariat with the drafting of corresponding resolution .... In the resolution, which we published in the Makedonsko delo [Macedonian Cause, an organ of VMRO (ob.)] in 1934, it was concluded that the Macedonian nation exists.

Vlahov, who declared himself until the 1930s as a Macedonian Bulgarian, apparently accepted the decision blindly and without any personal reaction. According to historians Tchavdar Marinov and Alexander Vezenkov, it is questionable that Comintern's authorities had a clear vision of identity issues in Macedonia. Vlahov's intervention seemed crucial in the adoption of this resolution. The executive committee ordered the leading cadres of the Balkan Secretariate, Henryk Walecki - a Pole, and Bohumír Šmeral - a Czech, to draw up a special resolution on the issue. Because they had no concept of this problem, the resolution was prepared with Vlahov's help. The basis of the new concept was the common view that "Macedonia is one of the hotbeds of the future imperialist war" and therefore the Comintern sought an option to blunt the contradictions between the countries that possess it. The resolution was published for the first time in the April issue of the IMRO (United) newspaper Makedonsko delo.

Vlahov mentioned that the resolution had a hostile reception both from members of the Bulgarian Communist Party and of the IMRO (United), residing in Moscow. In his memoirs, Vlahov acknowledged that this decision came "from above" and was controversial, and that local cadres in Yugoslav Macedonia did not accept it well. However, the resolution was accepted by CPY and BCP, seeing it as "a mutually acceptable solution to the national question in the area and a basis for a future union between the two countries or even a Balkan federation". The resolution did not ever mention Vlahov as a leader of the IMRO (United). Following the decision of the Comintern, IMRO (United) took as its slogan "the right of the Macedonian people to self-determination up to secession from the oppressor state" and formation of "united independent Macedonian Republic of working people." Despite the fact that this was formally a resolution of IMRO (United), as it was a document drafted by it, and adopted by the Comintern. Afterwards, the mainstream Bulgarian political opinion has maintained that the Comintern is the "inventor" of the idea of a separate Macedonian nation. Per Viktor Meier, the Greek notion that the Macedonian nation is an invention of the Comintern is "naturally nonsense", as the Comintern reflected the discourse of the Macedonian communists and other leftists, who were already making a clear separation between Macedonians and Bulgarians in the interwar period. In his memoirs, Vlahov confirmed that the national emancipation of the left-wing and communist Macedonian activists shaped the formula approved by the Comintern. Hence, per Marinov and Vezenkov, one cannot speak of a purely communist invention with no connection to reality. The Fourth Conference of the CPY in December 1934 accepted the existence of a Macedonian national identity and advocated for the creation of a Communist Party of Macedonia. KKE, bypassing Comintern directives, issued a resolution on "complete equality for the minorities" living in Greece in March 1935. Vlahov and the Comintern promoted Macedonian ethnic distinction to promote socialist internationalism. However, none of such Macedonians represented popular opinion in Macedonia or even the consensus of opinion of the Macedonian emigrants.

== Significance ==
During the Second World War, thousands of partisans in Yugoslav Macedonia accepted the Macedonian national cause. Some researchers doubt that even at that time the majority of Macedonian Slavs could precisely identify what they are. As a result of the previous Serbianisation, they clearly would not identify as Serbs. There were still some pro-Bulgarian sentiments among the peasants, mixed with the disappointment with Bulgaria, the Macedonian national awareness was intensifying. In August 1944, the Macedonian Partisans proclaimed a Macedonian state within Yugoslavia. After the Red Army entered the Balkans in late 1944, new communist regimes came into power in Bulgaria and Yugoslavia and their policy on the Macedonian Question was committed to supporting a distinct ethnic Macedonian identity. A separate Macedonian language was also codified in 1945. The Bulgarian historiography has referred to the resolution to discredit the Macedonian national identity as an "artificial construction" by the Soviet communist headquarters and/or by the BCP, while the Macedonian historiography regards the resolution as a "natural" consequence of the process of national development of the Macedonians.
