= Internal Macedonian Revolutionary Organization (United) =

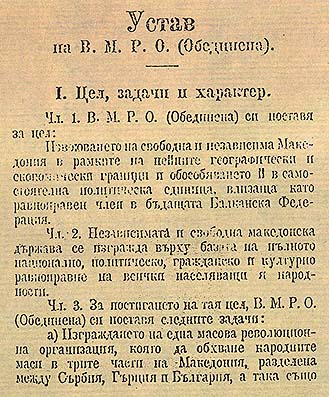
The statute of IMRO (United), 1925, Vienna (in Bulgarian).

The Internal Macedonian Revolutionary Organization (United), (Note: Bulgarian: Вътрешна македонска революционна организация - обединена, romanized: Vătrešna makedonska revoljucionna organizacija - Obedinena; Macedonian: Внатрешна македонска револуционерна организација - обединета, romanized: Vnatrešna makedonska revolucionerna organizacija - obedineta)) commonly known as IMRO (United), was a revolutionary and political organization active across the geographical region of Macedonia between 1925 and 1937.

== History ==
IMRO (United) was founded in 1925 in Vienna after the failure of the May Manifesto by the left wing of the Internal Macedonian Revolutionary Organization (IMRO) and former Macedonian Federative Organization activists. Per Alexis Heraclides, it was mostly a creation of the Communist International. According to historians Tchavdar Marinov and Alexander Vezenkov, the organization was controlled by the Bulgarian Communist Party (BCP). Per political scientist Dimitar Bechev, it was regarded as an offshoot of BCP. It was under the leadership of several revolutionaries from Macedonia such as Dimitar Vlahov (main founder), Pavel Shatev, Georgi Zankov, Rizo Rizov, Vladimir Poptomov, Metodi Shatorov and Hristo Yankov. Its main objective was to free Macedonia within its geographical and economical borders, and to create a new political entity which would become an equal member of the future Balkan Federative Republic. It became a member in the Balkan Communist Federation and was sponsored directly by the Comintern, maintaining close links with the Bulgarian communist leader Georgi Dimitrov. He, as a secret agent of GRU was responsible especially for the contacts with the IMRO (United). Yugoslav and Greek communist activists had reservations about the organization's establishment. Per Heraclides, the organization was immediately recognized by the communist parties of Bulgaria, Yugoslavia and Greece. It published two newspapers, La Fédération Balkanique and Makedonsko delo (written in standard Bulgarian).

The organization had antagonistic relations with the mainstream IMRO. Within the organization, there were two wings, such as the communist wing under Dimitar Vlahov, Vladimir Poptomov, Metodi Shatorov and Panko Brashnarov, and the national-revolutionary wing under Pavel Shatev and Georgi Zankov. In the 1920s, the IMRO (United), as a whole, defined the Slavs of Macedonia as Bulgarians and stressed a Macedonian political and civic national consciousness and nation. In the publications and documents of IMRO (United), terms such as "Macedonian people" and "Macedonian population" replaced the traditional references to Macedonian Bulgarians. IMRO (United) connected the terms "reactionary," "chauvinist" and "fascist" with the term "Bulgarian", such as when referring to Ivan Mihaylov's IMRO and the Bulgarian governments. On the other hand, the term "Macedonian" was connected to the terms "revolutionary," "progressive," and "people's". As early as October 1925, the first public declaration of IMRO (United) emphasized the oppressed status of the Macedonian people in Yugoslavia, Greece and mainly in Bulgaria. Some of the organization's activists claimed the Macedonians were a distinct nation, but they also retained Macedonian supranationalism. In July 1929, the branch of IMRO (United) in Pirin Macedonia classified the latter as a colony of Bulgaria, subdued to ruthless exploitation by the bourgeoisie state and Mihaylov's right-wing IMRO. In 1929, there was a split between the leftist activists, a group headed by Mihail Gerdzhikov, Pavel Shatev, Petar Poparsov and Filip Atanasov wanted IMRO (United) to work independently and not with the support of the Comintern. They also demanded the newspaper Makedonsko delo to cease publication. By the early 1930s, IMRO (United) endorsed Macedonian nationalism, mainly as result of the views of their younger members. In 1934, based on the activity of IMRO (United) the Resolution of the Comintern was made, which publicly acknowledged the existence of the Macedonian nation and Macedonian language. The text of this document was prepared in the period between December 20, 1933, and January 7, 1934, by the Balkan Secretariat of the Comintern. It was accepted by the Political Secretariat in Moscow on January 11, 1934, and approved by the Executive Committee of the Comintern. It was published for the first time in the April issue of Makedonsko delo under the title "The Situation in Macedonia and the Tasks of IMRO (United)." A declaration of IMRO (United) from 1935 stated:

Just as the Macedonians under Greek rule are neither "Slavophones" nor "pure" Greeks, [just] as the Macedonians under Serbian rule are not "pure" Serbs, so too the Macedonians under Bulgarian rule are not Bulgarians and nor do they wish to become [Bulgarians]. The Macedonian people have their own past, their present and future, not as a patch attached to imperialist Bulgaria, Greece and Serbia, but rather as an independent Slav element which possesses all the attributes of an independent nation, [and] which, for decades now, has been struggling to win its right to self determination, including secession into a political state unit independent from the imperialist states that now oppress it.

In 1936, 19 IMRO (United) members were put on trial due to suspected illegal political activity. Most of them (9) listed their nationality as Macedonian, while 5 as Bulgarian, and the rest were tried in absentia. Until its dissolution in 1937, IMRO (United) sought to act as a Communist Party of Macedonia, and in fact tried to serve as a Communist-led Macedonian national or popular front. Although during its existence it largely had support in Bulgarian Macedonia and among emigrants (especially after the end of Mihaylov's IMRO), while it had little influence over the Macedonian population in Greek Macedonia and Vardar Macedonia, since its activities there were restricted by the authorities. After the Comintern, triggered by the popular front tactics, dissolved it, most of the members ended up joining BCP. Also, later some of them organized and headed the Macedonian Literary Circle. According to historians Ivan Katardžiev and Stefan Dechev, a portion of the activists who came from IMRO (United) continued to regard themselves as Bulgarians and espoused only Macedonian political separatism.
