= Balkan Federation =

Proposed country

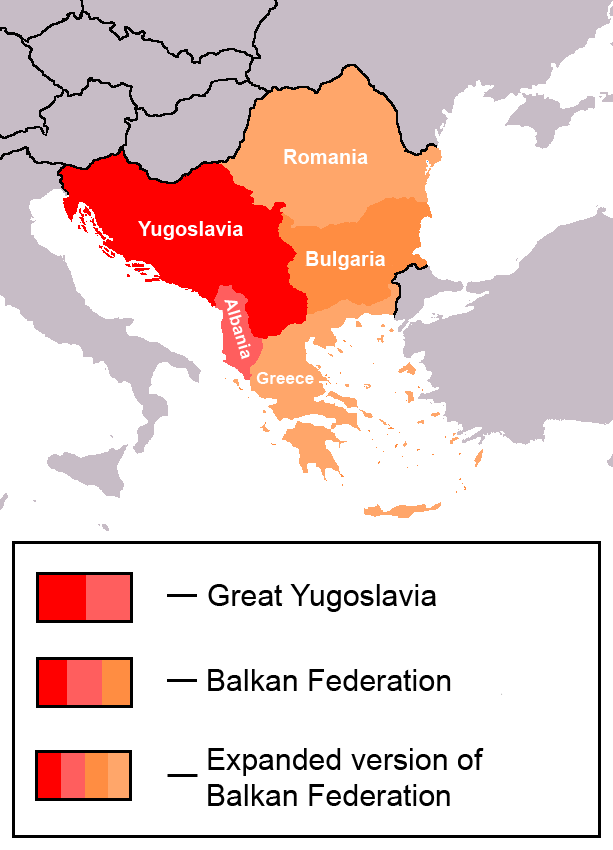
Comintern project on Balkan Federation

In late 19th and throughout the 20th century, the establishment of a Balkan Federation had been a recurrent suggestion of various political factions in the Balkans. The concept of a Balkan federation emerged in the late 19th century among left-wing political forces in the region. The central aim was to establish a new political unity: a common federal republic unifying the Balkan Peninsula on the basis of internationalism, socialism, social solidarity, and economic equality. The underlying vision was that, despite differences among the region's ethnic groups, the historical need for emancipation was a common basis for unification.

This political concept went through three phases in its development. In the first phase the idea was articulated as a response to the collapse of the Ottoman Empire at the beginning of the 20th century. In the second phase, mostly through the interwar period (1919–1936), the idea of the Balkan federation was taken up by the Balkan Communist parties. The third phase is characterized by the clash between the Balkan Communist leaders and Joseph Stalin, the latter of whom opposed the idea during the post-World War II period.

== Background ==
Flag of the pan-Balkan federation envisioned by the 18th-century revolutionary Rigas Feraios in his 1797 pamphlet New Political Constitution of the Inhabitants of Rumeli, Asia Minor, the Islands of the Aegean, and the principalities of Moldavia and Wallachia

The first inception occurred in Belgrade in 1865 when a number of Balkan intellectuals founded the Democratic Oriental Federation, proposing a federation from the Alps to Cyprus based on political freedom and social equality. They confirmed their adherence to the ideals of French Revolution in the line of Saint-Simon's federalism and in relation to the socialist ideas of Karl Marx or Mikhail Bakunin. Later, in France, a League for the Balkan Confederation, was constituted in 1894, in which Greek, Bulgarian, Serbian, and Romanian socialists participated, supporting Macedonian autonomy inside the general federation of Southeast Europe, as an attempt to deal with the complexity of the Macedonian Question. The next attempt came immediately after the Young Turk Revolution in 1908. The following year, in Salonika, the Socialist Workers Association merged with two Bulgarian socialist groups, and the Socialist Worker's Federation of Ottoman Workers was founded. This group underestimated, till 1913, the political significance of nationalism, as this significance manifested itself in the right of national self-determination. Its leadership kept a moderate position in regard with the nationalistic tendencies in Balkan social democratic parties.

== Balkan Socialist Federation ==
The movement for Balkan Socialist Federation arose after the Young Turk Revolution in 1908. The First Balkan Socialist Conference was held on January 7–9, 1910 in Belgrade. The main platforms at this conference were Balkan unity and action against the impending wars. Another important aspect was the call for a solution to the Macedonian Question. In 1915, after a conference in Bucharest, it was decided to create a Revolutionary Balkan Social Democratic Labour Federation, comprising groups which adhered to the Zimmerwald Conference and opposed participation in World War I. Initially headed by Christian Rakovsky, it had Vasil Kolarov and Georgi Dimitrov among its prominent activists. In 1915, Dimitrov wrote that Macedonia, "... which was split into three parts ...", would be, "... reunited into a single state enjoying equal rights within the framework of the Balkan Democratic Federation." This independent and united Macedonia would have consisted of the corresponding geographical regions of Bulgaria, Yugoslavia, and Greece. The leaders of the Federation were repressed by the Balkan governments at different intervals. Rakovsky was expelled from various Balkan countries and, during World War I, became a founding member of the Revolutionary Balkan Social Democratic Labor Federation. Later he made his way to Russia, where he joined the Bolshevik Party after the October Revolution in 1917, and subsequently Dimitrov, Kolarov, and Rakovsky became members of the Comintern.

== Balkan Communist Federation ==
After the Russian October Revolution, a Balkan Communist Federation was formed in 1920–1921, and was influenced by Vladimir Lenin's views on nationality (see Proletarian internationalism). It was a Communist umbrella organisation in which all the Communist parties in the Balkans were represented. It was dominated by the requirements imposed by the Soviet Union through the Comintern. It advocated a "Balkan Federative Republic" that would have included Bulgaria, Yugoslavia, Greece, and Turkey; some projects also involved Romania, but most of them only envisaged its fragmentation. The body thus oversaw the activities of the Bulgarian Communist Party (BKP), the Communist Party of Yugoslavia (KPJ), the Communist Party of Greece (KKE), the Communist Party of Turkey (TKP), and, to a certain measure, those of the Communist Party of Romania (PCdR). It was disestablished in 1939.

=== Bulgarian Communist Party ===
At the Sixth Conference of the Balkan Communist Federation in November 1923 the motion for "autonomy of Macedonia, Dobruja and Thrace" was raised by Vasil Kolarov and was backed by Dimitrov, the Bulgarian delegate who presided over the meeting. The Greek delegate asked for a postponement as he was reluctant to approve a motion that was not on the agenda. In 1924 the Comintern entered negotiations about collaboration between the Communists and the Internal Macedonian Revolutionary Organization (IMRO), Internal Thracian Revolutionary Organisation (ITRO) and Internal Dobrujan Revolutionary Organisation (IDRO), and the creation of a united revolutionary movement. The idea for a new unified organization was supported by the Soviet Union, which saw a chance for using this well developed revolutionary movements to spread revolution in the Balkans and destabilize the Balkan monarchies.

The so-called May Manifesto of 6 May 1924 was issued in which the objectives of the unified Macedonian liberation movement were presented: independence and unification of partitioned Macedonia, fighting all the neighbouring Balkan monarchies, forming a Balkan Communist Federation and cooperation with the Soviet Union. In 1925, under the influence of the BKP, several left-wing splinter groups (the Internal Macedonian Revolutionary Organization (United), the Dobrujan Revolutionary Organisation and the Internal Thracian Organization), respectively, seceded from the main organizations. These wings militated for their own Soviet Republics, which would be part of a "Balkan Communist Federation". The BKP was compelled by Stalin to endorse the formation of Macedonian, Thracian, and Dobrujan nations in order to include those new separate states in the Balkan Communist Federation. Later, a resolution of the Balkan Communist Federation for the recognition of a Macedonian ethnicity was issued on January 7, 1934, by the Balkan Secretariat of the Comintern. It was accepted by the Political Secretariat in Moscow on January 11, 1934, and approved by the Executive Committee of the Comintern. Afterwards, the Macedonian case was distinguished from that of Thrace and Dobruja in 1936, the Thracians and Dobrujans were regarded again as parts of the Bulgarian population. Most likely this change was related to the intricate form of the Macedonian case itself and the identity development inside Macedonia that had no resemblance in Thrace or Dobruja. In 1936 the IMRO (United) and the left wings of ITRO and IDRO were incorporated in the BKP.

=== Communist Party of Greece and Communist Party of Yugoslavia ===
The KKE delegate Nikolaos Sargologos signed the motion for autonomy of Macedonia, Dobruja and Thrace without central authorisation; instead of returning to Athens, he emigrated to the United States. The KKE-controlled newspaper, Rizospastis, was against the motion because it saw it as good for the BKP in Bulgaria but disastrous for the KKE in Greece. The KKE found the BCF's position on Macedonia difficult but briefly went along with it. In June 1924, at its 5th meeting, it recognised "the Macedonian people" and in December 1924, it endorsed the motion for "a united and independent Macedonia and a united and independent Thrace" with the perspective of entering into a union within a Balkan federation "against the national and social yoke of the Greek and Bulgarian bourgeoisie".

However, the KKE suffered a crushing defeat in the 1928 Greek elections, especially in Greek Macedonia. Dissentions within the KKE had already made the motion untenable by 1927, and in March, the KKE conference watered it down, calling for self-determination of the Macedonians until they join a "Balkan Soviet Socialist Federation" and only for "a section of Macedonia (Florina area) inhabited by Slavomacedonians". By 1935, it simply called for "equal rights to all" due to the "change of the national composition of the Greek part of Macedonia" and hence because "the Leninist–Stalinist principle of self-determination demands the substitution of the old slogan".

The KPJ had its own problems and dissentions; fears of Serbianisation of the party and of the Vardar Banovina, whose inhabitants mostly despised the Kingdom of Yugoslavia's Serbian authorities. The KPJ followed the KKE example in 1936.

=== Albanian Communists ===
In Albania, Communist ideas were mainly influenced by neighbouring countries. Despite the effort of the Comintern to establish a Communist Party by sending and supporting emissaries as Kosta Boshnjaku and Ali Kelmendi later, Communist groups were not well organized, and they were weak. The Communist Party would be established only in 1941. Nevertheless, the contacts of the Albanians with Comintern were set much before. The Paris Peace Conference had fixed the borders of Albania as defined pre-World War I by the London Conference of 1912–13, leaving substantial Albanian-populated areas outside of its borders. At the same time, the country was dominated during the early 1920s by an Ottoman ruling class with no intention of addressing the country's sharp topics, including an agrarian reform and the fate of the Albanians left outside the borders.

In the early 1920s, two entities came in contact with the Comintern: the left-wing opposition led by Bishop Fan Noli, and the Committee of Kosovo. Bajram Curri, a Kosovar Albanian and key person of both, said in December 1921 to the Soviet minister in Vienna that "the Albanian people await impatiently the determination of their frontiers not on the basis of brutal and bloody historical considerations, but rather on the basis of the situation which actually exists today. With the firm conviction that Soviet Russia will be able in the near future to determine the boundaries of Europe, especially in the Balkans, in a just manner, I pray that the great Soviet government will grant our just requests at that time."

After the failed June Revolution, Noli and others settled in Vienna where they formed KONARE (Revolutionary National Committee), a left-wing revolutionary committee openly pro-Soviet. Though KONARE, but even by themselves, the Committee of Kosovo would join the Balkan Federation and receive financial support. They would cooperate with IMRO militants as Todor Aleksandrov and Petar Chaulev. By 1928, KONARE came de facto under the control of the Comintern; 24 young Albanians were sent to Moscow to study in Soviet institutions. But by the early 1930s, the defense of Yugoslavia became an official Communist line. This way any support for the Committee of Kosovo faded. The introduction of Fascist Italy's interests in the equation completely disrupted any connection between Albanian nationalist movements and the Comintern. KONARE would also dissolve in the mid-1930s, leaving the Comintern with few scattered communists groups within Albania.

== Greece and Balkan unity ==
Eleftherios Venizelos and Alexandros Papanastasiou were supporters of an organization like the European Union in the Balkans, Venizelos discussed it repeatedly between 1929-1933 and Papanastasiou tried to put into action, having only three initial proposals for the union to work. First, a Balkan-wide non-aggression pact with all other Balkan states; second, deeper economic cooperation within the Balkan states; and third, freedom of movement and work within the Balkans and the ability for any citizen of any member to be able to live in another member state. This proposal was controversial within the Greek government and Venizelists because it went against the nationalist ideals of Venizelism and Venizelos', the fact that it would damage Greco-Italian relations due to the fact that a semi-united Balkan federation would damage Italian influence and it would also hurt other Great Powers (The United Kingdom, France and the United States) as it would also limit their influence in the Balkan peninsula, another setback on the proposal was that Yugoslavia and Bulgaria barely took any interest in it.

== Cominform period (1946–1948) ==
For a short period during the Cominform, the Yugoslav and Bulgarian Communist leaders Josip Broz Tito and Georgi Dimitrov worked on a project to merge their two countries into a Balkan Federative Republic. As a concession to the Yugoslav side, Bulgarian authorities agreed to the recognition of a distinct Macedonian ethnicity and language in part of their own population in the Bulgarian part of the geographic region of Macedonia. This was one of the conditions of the Bled Agreement, signed between Yugoslavia and Bulgaria on 1 August 1947. In November 1947, pressured by both the Yugoslavs and the Soviets, Bulgaria also signed a treaty of friendship with Yugoslavia. The Bulgarian head of state Georgi Dimitrov was sympathetic to the Macedonian Question. The Bulgarian Communist party was compelled once again to adapt its stance to Soviet interests in the Balkans. The policies resulting from the agreement were reversed after the Tito–Stalin split in June 1948, when Bulgaria, being subordinated to Soviet interests, was forced to take a stance against Yugoslavia.

== Contemporary period ==
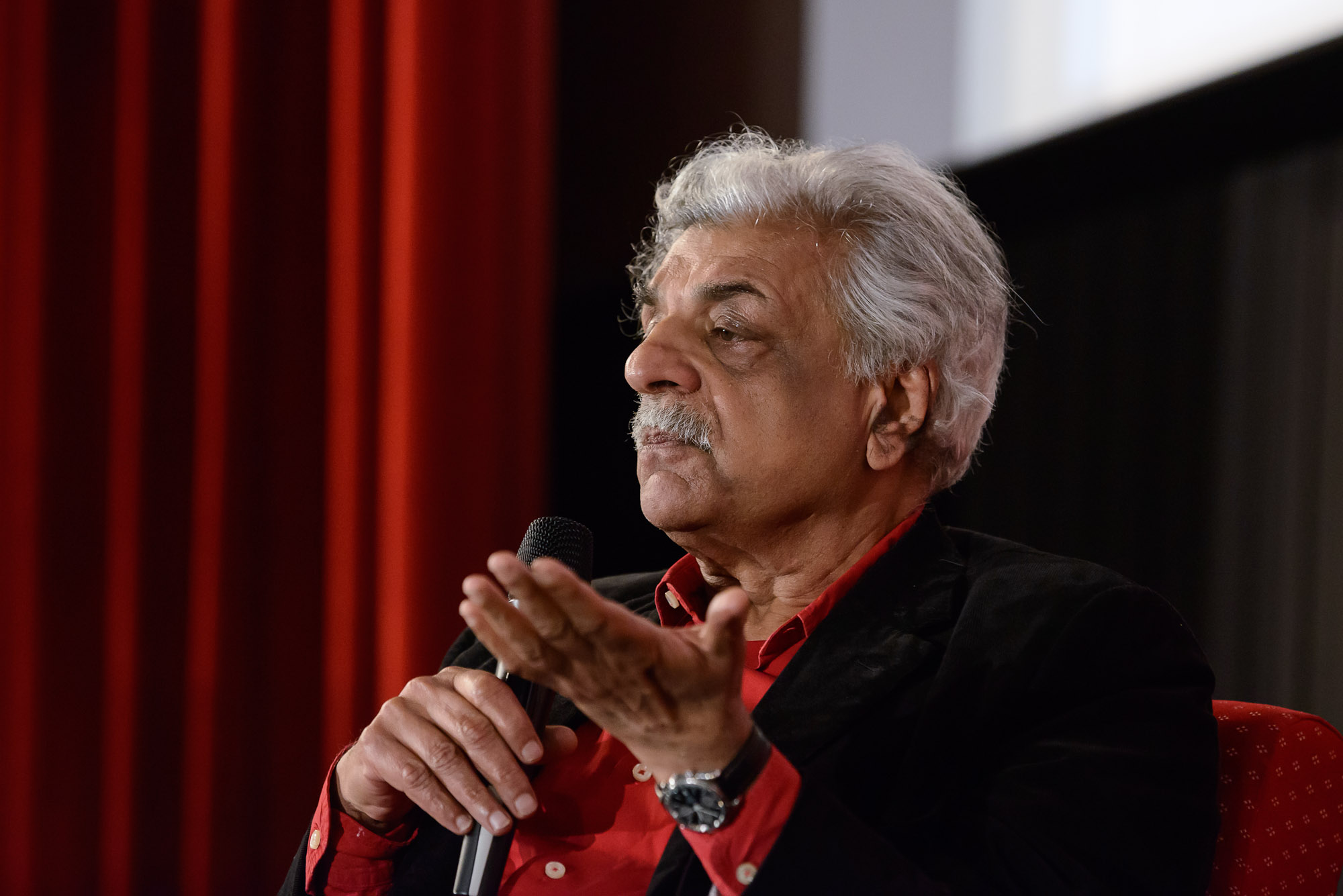
Tariq Ali at the 2012 Subversive Film Festival in Zagreb.

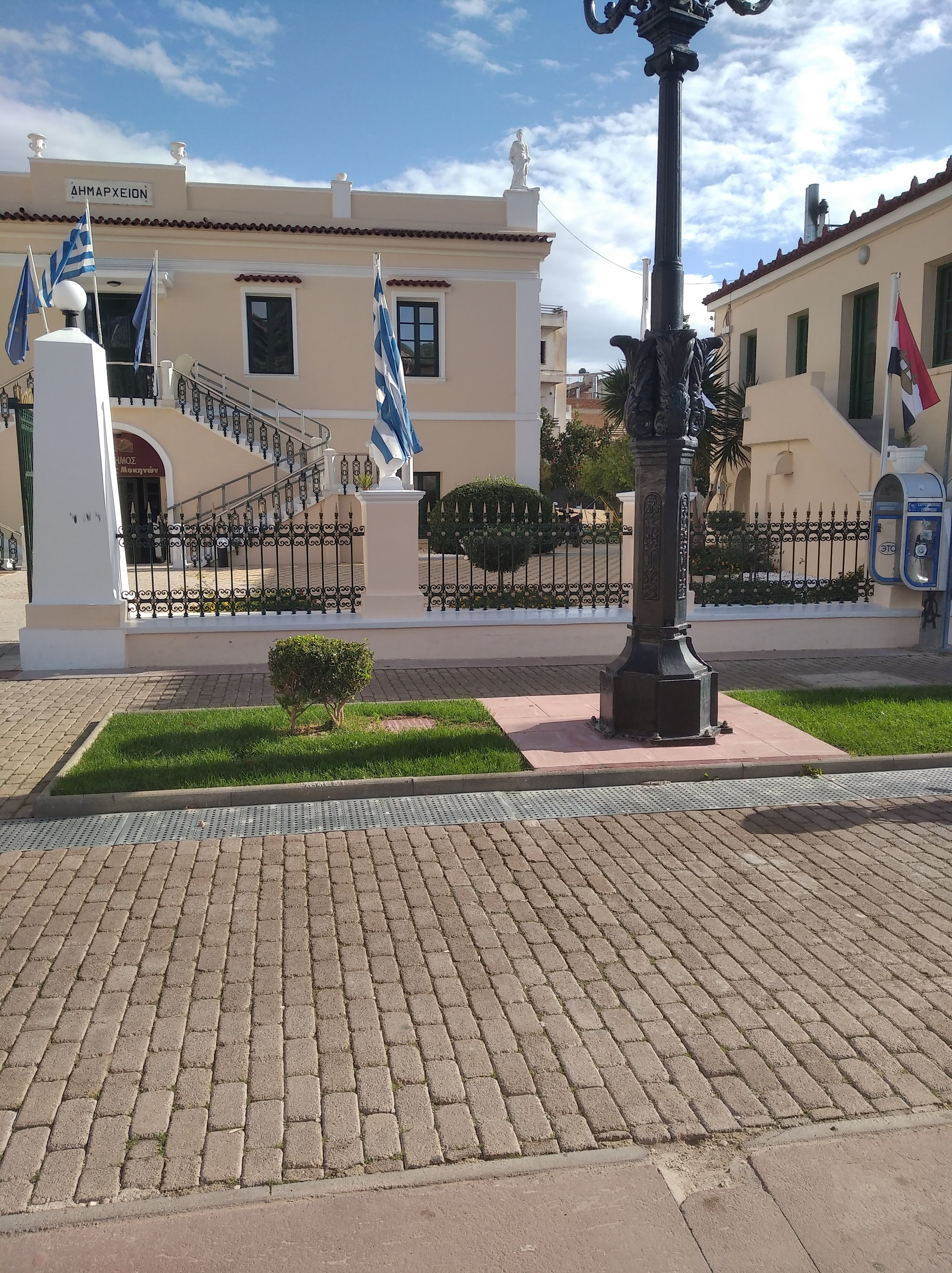
The flag of the Balkan Federation hoisted in Argos, Peloponnese, as a part of the celebrations for the bicentennial of the Greek independence.

The Article 142 of the Constitution of Croatia explicitly prohibits any procedure which may lead to creation of association with other states if this procedure leads or may lead to a renewal of a South Slavic state union or to any form of consolidated Balkan state. This provision of the Croatian Constitution was criticized in 2009 by the President of the Civil Committee for Human Rights Zoran Pusić (brother of Vesna Pusić) who underlined that it is unacceptable to restrict the right to associate with some country based on ethnic reasons. The committee, however, did not advocate for any such a union, but underlined that the Article was introduced at the time of the Croatian War of Independence and before the overthrow of Slobodan Milošević in Serbia, and that as such it fails to acknowledge that all countries change over the time and that in the context of European integration future generations in Croatia should be free from such constraints.

In his interview with Nick Holdstock during the 2012 Subversive Film Festival in Zagreb, Pakistani-British political activist and writer Tariq Ali argued for the creation of the Balkan Federation as a part of wider formation of European regional federations capable of balancing the influence of the major European powers such as Germany or France.

Ivaylo Ditchev, professor of cultural anthropology at Sofia University, stated in one interview for Deutsche Welle that revival of the Yugoslav spirit of openness and cultural diversity and revival of the post-war utopian idea of Balkan Federation would be beneficial for the region and its European integration.

== See also ==
- Balkan Battlegroup
- Balkan Games – Regional athletics competition
- Balkan League – 1912 anti-Ottoman military alliance
- Balkan Pact – 1934 treaty among various Balkan nations to maintain the post-WWI status quo
- Balkan Pact (1953) – 1953 Greek-Turkish-Yugoslav cooperation treaty
- Balkan sprachbund – Shared linguistic features in southeastern Europe
- Balkan studies – Academic field
- Balkania – Proposed state in the Balkans
- Balkanization – Fragmentation of a country or region
- Craiova Group – Cooperation project between Romania, Bulgaria, Greece and Serbia
- Hellenoturkism – Political concept of unifying Greek and Turkish nations
- Imagining the Balkans – 1997 book by Maria Todorova
- Regional Roaming Agreement – Balkan agreement on mobile roaming charges
- Union of Bulgaria and Romania – Unsuccessful proposed union between Bulgaria and Romania
- Union of Hungary and Romania – Unsuccessful historical proposal to unite Hungary and Romania
- Yugoslav irredentism – Political movement to merge Slav regions
