= Prosechen Island =

Island in the South Shetland Islands

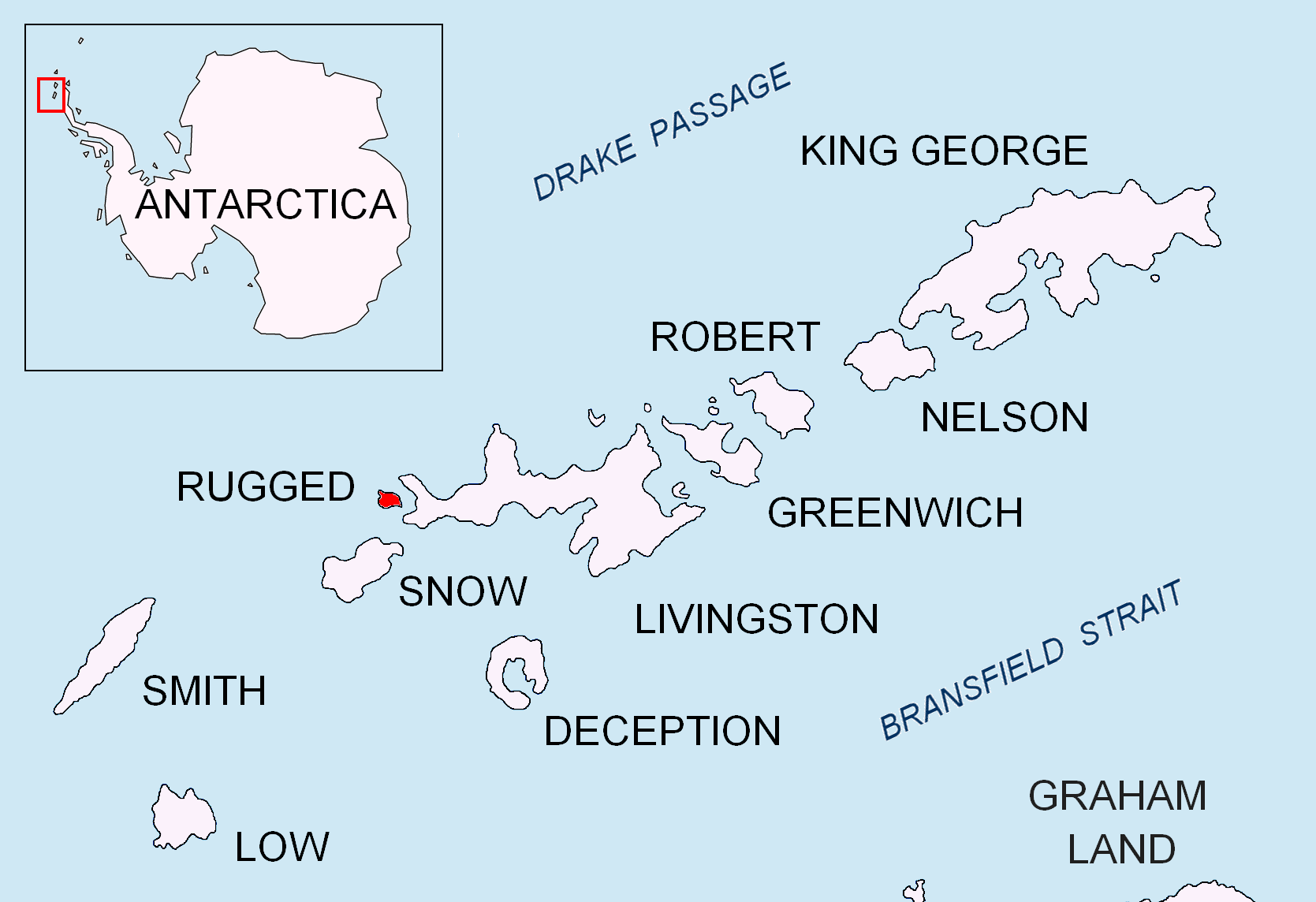
- Location of Rugged Island in the South Shetland Islands

- Location within Antarctica Location within Antarctic Peninsula

Geography
- Location: Antarctica
- Coordinates: 62°37′23″S 61°17′44″W
- Archipelago: South Shetland Islands

Administration
- Antarctica
- Administered under the Antarctic Treaty System

Demographics
- Population: uninhabited

Prosechen Island (Bulgarian: остров Просечен, romanized: ostrov Prosechen, IPA: [ˈɔstrof proˈsɛt͡ʃɛn]) is the northern of two rocky islands in Smyadovo Cove on the west coast of Rugged Island in the South Shetland Islands. The area was visited by early 19th century sealers. It is named after the settlement of Prosechen in Northeastern Bulgaria.

== Description ==
First described by early 19th century sealers, the feature is 500 metres (1,600 ft) long in east–west direction and 140 metres (460 ft) wide. The island is named after the settlement of Prosechen in Northeastern Bulgaria.

== Location ==
Prosechen Island is located at 62°37′23″S 61°17′44″W, which is 1.04 kilometres (2/3 mi) south of Cape Sheffield and 500 metres (1/3 mi) north by east of Ugain Point. It is separated from Rugged Island to the north and Toledo Island to the south by 70 metres (230 ft) and 60 metres (200 ft) wide passages respectively. Spanish mapping took place in 1992 and Bulgarian mapping in 2009.

== See also ==
- List of Antarctic and subantarctic islands

== Maps ==
- Península Byers, Isla Livingston. Mapa topográfico a escala 1:25000. Madrid: Servicio Geográfico del Ejército, 1992.
- L.L. Ivanov. Antarctica: Livingston Island and Greenwich, Robert, Snow and Smith Islands. Scale 1:120000 topographic map. Troyan: Manfred Wörner Foundation, 2010. ISBN 978-954-92032-9-5 (First edition 2009. ISBN 978-954-92032-6-4)
- Antarctic Digital Database (ADD). Scale 1:250000 topographic map of Antarctica. Scientific Committee on Antarctic Research (SCAR). Since 1993, regularly upgraded and updated.
- L.L. Ivanov. Antarctica: Livingston Island and Smith Island. Scale 1:100000 topographic map. Manfred Wörner Foundation, 2017. ISBN 978-619-90008-3-0
