= Toledo Island =

Island in the South Shetland Islands, Antarctica

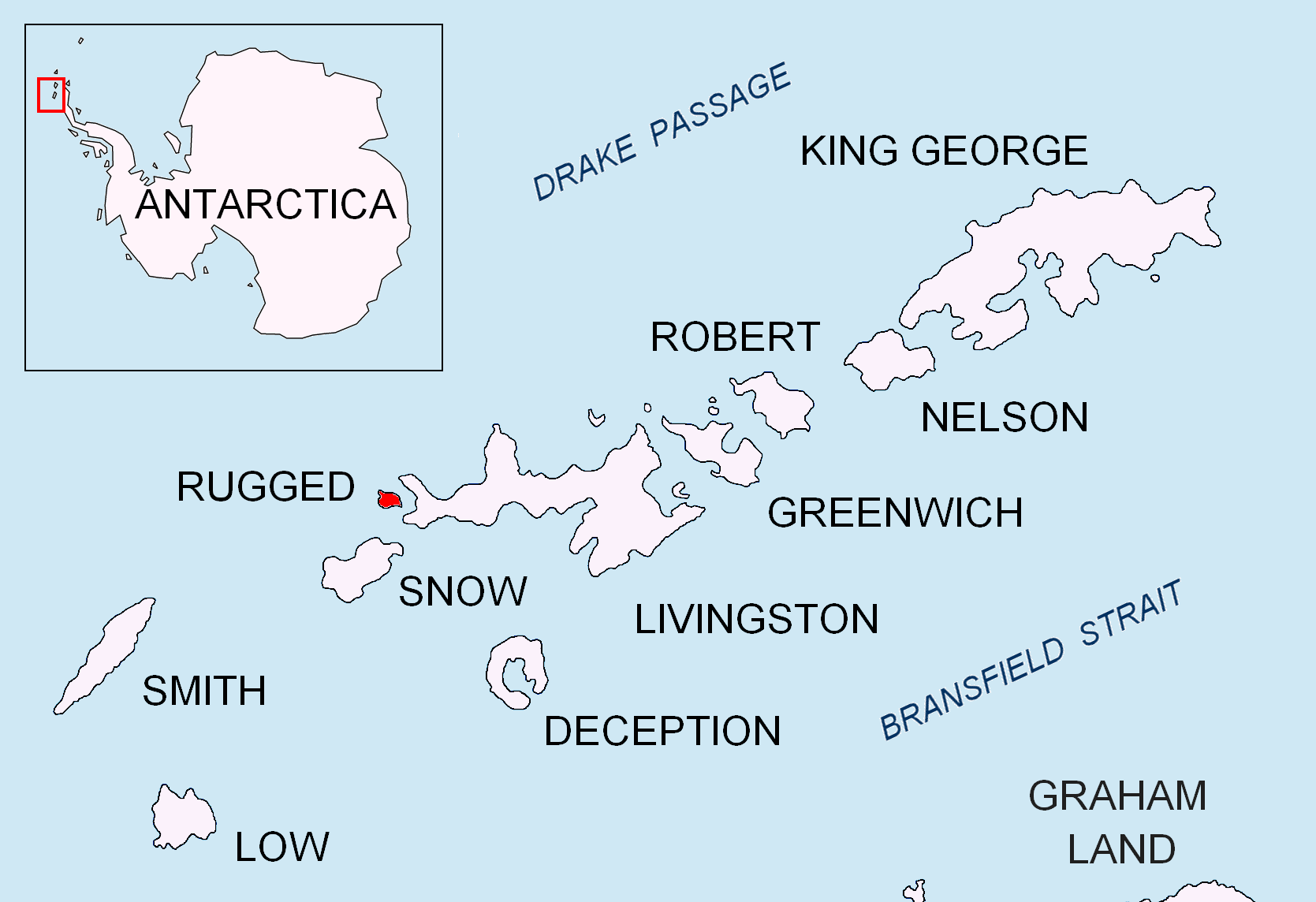
- Location of Rugged Island in the South Shetland Islands

- Location on Antarctic Peninsula Location in Antarctica

Geography
- Location: Antarctica
- Coordinates: 62°37′29″S 61°18′04″W
- Archipelago: South Shetland Islands

Administration
- Antarctica
- Administered under the Antarctic Treaty System

Demographics
- Population: uninhabited

Topographic map of Livingston Island and Smith Island

Toledo Island (Bulgarian: остров Толедо, romanized: ostrov Toledo, IPA: [ˈɔstrof toˈlɛdo]) is the southern of two rocky islands in Smyadovo Cove on the west coast of Rugged Island in the South Shetland Islands. The feature is 320 m (1,050 ft) long in east–west direction and 110 m (360 ft) wide. It is separated from Rugged Island to the southeast and Prosechen Island to the north by 40 and 60 m (130 and 200 ft) wide passages respectively. The area was visited by early 19th century sealers.

The island is named after Joaquín de Toledo y Parra (1780–1819), Captain of the Spanish warship San Telmo that sank with 644 men on board off the north coast of Livingston Island in September 1819.

== Location ==
Toledo Island is located at 62°37′29″S 61°18′04″W, which is 1.23 km (0.76 mi) south of Cape Sheffield and 300 m (980 ft) north by west of Ugain Point. Spanish mapping in 1992 and Bulgarian mapping in 2009.

== Maps ==
- Península Byers, Isla Livingston. Mapa topográfico a escala 1:25000. Madrid: Servicio Geográfico del Ejército, 1992.
- L.L. Ivanov. Antarctica: Livingston Island and Greenwich, Robert, Snow and Smith Islands. Scale 1:120000 topographic map. Troyan: Manfred Wörner Foundation, 2010. ISBN 978-954-92032-9-5 (First edition 2009. ISBN 978-954-92032-6-4)
- Antarctic Digital Database (ADD). Scale 1:250000 topographic map of Antarctica. Scientific Committee on Antarctic Research (SCAR). Since 1993, regularly upgraded and updated.
- L.L. Ivanov. Antarctica: Livingston Island and Smith Island. Scale 1:100000 topographic map. Manfred Wörner Foundation, 2017. ISBN 978-619-90008-3-0
