= Radko Association =

Macedonian political organization for Bulgarians

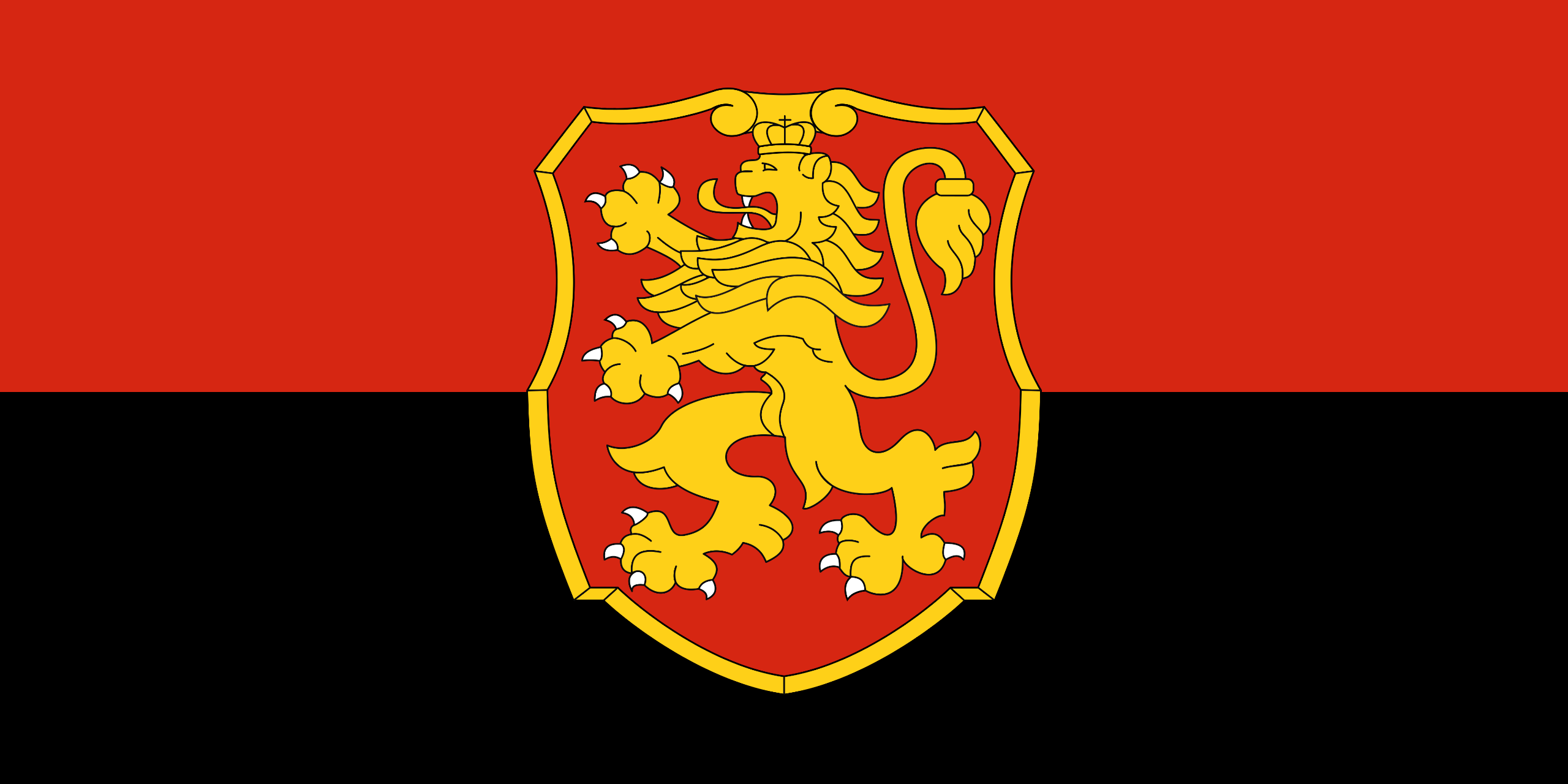
Flag of the Radko Association

The Radko Association (Bulgarian: Сдружение Радко, Sdruzhenie Radko; Macedonian: Здружение Радко, Združenie Radko) is a political organization of citizens of North Macedonia with a Bulgarian national consciousness. Founded in 2000 and based in Ohrid, the association was named after Internal Macedonian Revolutionary Organization (IMRO) leader Ivan Mihailov's most popular pseudonym. The Radko Association was presided by the Ohrid native Vladimir Pankov until his death in 2019.

Among the association's goals are amendments to the Macedonian constitution in order to make Bulgarian an official language, the constitutional recognition of Bulgarians as a national community, and the cessation of state discrimination and repression towards the Bulgarian-identifying population. The association is critical of the official historiography in North Macedonia and claims that the Macedonian ethnic identity was forcefully imposed on Vardar Macedonia's Bulgarian population.

In 2001, the association was declared unconstitutional and banned by the Constitutional Court of the Republic of Macedonia. However, the European Court of Human Rights held that the dissolution of the Association infringed Article 11 of the European Convention on Human Rights. The court ordered the Macedonian state to pay five thousand euros in respect of non-pecuniary damage and four thousand euros in respect of costs and expenses.

== See also ==
- Bulgarians in the Republic of Macedonia
- Macedonian Bulgarians
- Bulgarian Cultural Club – Skopje
- Radko Knoll
