= Bulgarians in North Macedonia =

Demographics of Bulgarians in the country of North Macedonia

Total population
- 3,504 (census 2021)

Regions with significant populations
- Strumica and surrounding region

Languages
- Bulgarian and Macedonian

Religion
- Macedonian Orthodox Church

Related ethnic groups
- Bulgarians, Macedonians

Bulgarians are an ethnic minority in North Macedonia. Bulgarians are mostly found in the Strumica area, but over the years, the absolute majority of southeastern North Macedonia have declared themselves Macedonian. The town of Strumica and its surrounding area (including Novo Selo) were part of the Kingdom of Bulgaria between the Balkan Wars and the end of World War I, as well as during World War II. The total number of Bulgarians counted in the 2021 Census was 3,504 or roughly 0.2%. Over 100,000 nationals of North Macedonia have received Bulgarian citizenship since 2001 and some 53,000 are still waiting for such, almost all based on declared Bulgarian origin. In the period when North Macedonia was part of Yugoslavia, there was also migration of Bulgarians from the so called Western Outlands in Serbia.

== History ==
=== Yugoslavia ===
Number and percentage of the Bulgarian ethnic minority in Macedonia from 1948-2021
Ethnic group	census 1948		census 1953		census 1961		census 1971		census 1981		census 1991		census 1994		census 2002		census 2021	
Ethnic group	Number	%	Number	%	Number	%	Number	%	Number	%	Number	%	Number	%	Number	%	Number	%
Bulgarians	889	0.1	920	0.1	3,087	0.2	3,334	0.2	1,984	0.1	1,370	0.1	1,682	0.1	1,417	0.1	3,504	0.2

Until the Balkan Wars the majority of the Slav population of all three parts of the wider region of Macedonia had Bulgarian identity. In 1913, the region of present-day Republic of North Macedonia became a part of the Kingdom of Serbia, thus becoming Southern Serbia. During World War I and World War II, when most regions of Macedonia were annexed by Bulgaria, a pro-Bulgarian sentiment still existed among the Slavic majority. However, harsh treatment by occupying Bulgarian troops and forcible Bulgarianisation by the authorities significantly reduced the pro-Bulgarian orientation of the Macedonian Slavs. After the end of World War II, the creation of People's Republic of Macedonia and the codification of a new Macedonian language, a process of ethnogenesis started and a distinct national Macedonian identity was inaugurated into an established system, policies which were accepted by the overwhelming majority of the Slavic population in Macedonia without a problem. The new Yugoslav authorities began a policy of removing of any Bulgarian influence, making North Macedonia a connecting link for the establishment of new Balkan Communist Federation and creating a distinct Slavic consciousness that would inspire identification with Yugoslavia. With such policies, the Yugoslav communist authorities mostly overcame the remaining pro-Bulgarian sentiments among much of the population. The authorities also took repressive measures against those who retained their pro-Bulgarian feelings, such as the Law for the Protection of Macedonian National Honour, which was passed by the government of the SR Macedonia at the end of 1944. The Presidium of Anti-fascist Assembly for the National Liberation of Macedonia established a special court for the implementation of this law, which came into effect on 3 January 1945. Bulgarian sources claim that in early 1945, around 100,000 Bulgarophiles were imprisoned and over 1,260 were allegedly killed due to this Law. However, some Bulgarian researchers have questioned these figures, noting that the assertion that these individuals were persecuted and killed solely on account of their Bulgarian national consciousness is deceptive. Per political scientist Mirjana Maleska, in SR Macedonia, the Bulgarophobia increased almost to the level of state ideology, influenced partly by past hardships that Macedonians experienced as a result of certain nationalist and chauvinistic circles in Bulgaria, but a great part of these anti-Bulgarian sentiments were result from the need to distinguish between the Bulgarian and the Macedonian nations. In the period between 1945 and 1991, when North Macedonia was part of Yugoslavia, there was also migration of Bulgarian population from SR Serbia to the SR Macedonia. The number of these migrants is unofficially estimated at 20,000.

=== Post-independence ===
By the time the then-Republic of Macedonia proclaimed its independence those who continued to look to Bulgaria were very few. Some 3,000–4,000 people that stuck to their Bulgarian identity (most from Strumica and surroundings) met great hostility among the authorities and the rest of the population. With the fall of Communism the hostility decreased, but still remains. Occasional trials against Bulgarophiles have occurred. In the period after 1991 ca. 100,000 citizens of North Macedonia have acquired Bulgarian citizenship (which represents 10% of the self-declared ethnic Macedonians in the country in the 2021 population census), almost all of them acquired by descent and until 2023 on 1st position by acquired citizenship per country. On 11 December 2020 at the Parliament, the Minister of Justice of Bulgaria Desislava Ahladova reported that from 1 January 2010 to 22 October 2020, 77,829 files have been opened for the acquisition of Bulgarian citizenship by citizens of North Macedonia, 77,762 of them based on declared Bulgarian origin. In 2018 Bulgaria faced a scandal over the alleged sale of citizenship documents. Former Citizenship Council director Katya Mateva exposed a scheme in which the State Agency for Bulgarians Abroad issued thousands of falsified certificates of Bulgarian origin to Macedonians and Albanians in exchange for bribes.

In 2021, Bulgarian President Rumen Radev claimed that some 120,000 Macedonian citizens held Bulgarian passports and insisted on putting them into North Macedonia's constitution, which lists the Albanian, Serbian, Bosniak, Turkish, Romani peoples, as well as the other peoples inhabiting the country. Despite sizable number of Macedonians that have acquired Bulgarian citizenship since 2002, only 3,504 citizens of North Macedonia declared themselves as ethnic Bulgarians in the 2021 census, which was observed and welcomed by the European Commission. The Bulgarian side does not accept these results as completely objective, citing as an example the census has counted less than 20,000 people with Bulgarian citizenship in the country, while in fact they are over 100,000. The "passport paradox" indirectly contributes to the Bulgarian claims, therefore Bulgaria does not classify the Bulgarians as a national minority but rather as "citizens of North Macedonia with Bulgarian self-awareness", a framing that implies their actual number is higher than reported in census data. However, the discrepancy demonstrates that Macedonian applicants are primarily motivated by economic reasons and access to an EU passport rather than by Bulgarian ethnic identity.

Year	Period	Acquired citizenships	Position
2002-2012	22.01.2002-15.01.2012	44,211	1
2012	23.01.2012-22.01.2013	8,185	1
2013	23.01.2013-22.01.2014	4,388	1
2014	01.01.2014-31.12.2014	1,874	1
2015	01.01.2015-31.12.2015	4,315	1
2016	01.01.2016-31.12.2016	6,196	1
2017	14.01.2017-31.12.2017	1,150	1
2018	01.01.2018-31.12.2018	3,619	1
2019	01.01.2019-31.12.2019	5,628	1
2020	01.01.2020-31.12.2020	9,098	1
2021	01.01.2021-31.12.2021	7,696	1
2022	01.01.2022-31.12.2022	1,992	1
2023	01.01.2023-31.12.2023	2,422	1
2024	01.01.2024-31.12.2024	1,698	4
2025	01.01.2025-31.12.2025	1,975	3
Total	22.01.2002-22.01.2025	104 447	1

Bulgarians in North Macedonia receive state funding from Bulgaria as a part of the "Bulgarian State's commitment to historic Bulgarian communities and citizens abroad". Despite being the second smallest community covered by the programme, Bulgarians in North Macedonia are treated as priority group and receive 34% of the total funding.

There were 37 ethnic Bulgarians born in North Macedonia who lived in the United States of America in 2015.

A total of 210 people in North Macedonia voted in the 2026 Bulgarian parliamentary election.

== Politics ==
Bulgarians in North Macedonia do not have their own political parties, but still have political activity. Per Bulgarian researchers, there has been an persisting "de-bulgarization" and resistance to the constitutional acknowledgement of the presence of Bulgarian minority in North Macedonia. This is despite the EU negotiating framework, which requires their inclusion in the constitution of the country. The discrimination of the Bulgarian ethnic community in North Macedonia is a result of the denial of the local political elite to recognize the Bulgarian cultural and historical heritage in the region of Macedonia. The use of terms such as "Bulgarization" and the policy of hostility towards Bulgaria in the country needs to cover up the challenges facing North Macedonia: the crisis of Macedonian identity, the crisis of its political elite, and the crisis of the country’s geo-political orientation.

In July 2022 in Sofia, the foreign ministers of Bulgaria and North Macedonia signed a Second bilateral protocol to the Treaty of Good Neighborhood and Friendship between the two countries. Such protocols were supposed to be signed every year, but in practice they have not been signed since 2019. According to the decision of the Bulgarian National Assembly of 24 June 2022 the signing of this protocol was a condition for Bulgaria to approve the Negotiating Framework for the Republic of North Macedonia. The protocol contains specific measures and deadlines for the implementation of agreements on historical issues between the two countries, measures against hate speech, etc. As a result, on 24 June 2022, Bulgaria's parliament approved lifting the country's veto on opening EU accession talks with North Macedonia. On 16 July 2022, the Assembly of North Macedonia also approved the French proposal, allowing accession negotiations to begin. The start of negotiations was officially launched on 19 July 2022. The next Prime Minister of North Macedonia elected in 2024, rejected the content of the Second protocol, the constitutional recognition of Bulgarian minority in North Macedonia and the Treaty of Good Neighborhood and Friendship between the two countries. Mickoski stated that constitutional changes could not proceed unless the EU provided credible assurances that this would be the final identity-related demand and that Bulgaria would not be able to impose further vetoes based on historical or linguistic disputes after the amendment was adopted. Furthermore, as the European Court of Human Rights has repeatedly found Bulgaria in violation of international conventions regarding the Macedonian minority, and its recommendations have remained unimplemented, Mickoski's government regards their implementation by Sofia as a second condition for introducing constitutional changes. To these claims, the Enlargement Commissioner Marta Kos responded that there has never been a case where a candidate country has received guarantees that no other disputes will arise during the accession process, and it is important to understand this. In June 2026, the European Parliament emphasized that including Bulgarians in the country's constitution is a mandatory condition, calling on North Macedonia to stop any attempts to destroy and falsify Bulgarian historical heritage in the country.

A total of 16 Bulgarian organisations are active in North Macedonia, including one school, nine associations, three cultural centers, one folklore group, and two media portals, of which one works under the programs of the Bulgarian Ministry of Internal Affairs.

=== Association Radko ===
Association Radko is an illegal Bulgarian political organisation in North Macedonia. The "Radko" association was registered in Ohrid in 2000. In 2001 the Constitutional Court of North Macedonia banned the organization Radko as "promoting racial and religious hate and intolerance". The association is named after the conspiration pseudonym of Ivan Mihailov, leader of Internal Macedonian Revolutionary Organization during the interbellum. In official Macedonian historiography, Mihailov is a terrorist and a Bulgarian chauvinist. In 2009 the European Court of Human Rights in Strasbourg, condemned North Macedonia because of violations of the European Convention of Human Rights in this case. The state paid compensation, and the Committee of Ministers of the Council of Europe closed the case after verifying that all required individual and general measures had been implemented.

=== Bulgarian clubs ===
In the autumn of 2022, the parliament of North Macedonia adopted changes to the Law on Associations and Foundations in which clubs and organizations cannot be registered if their names reference fascism and national socialism or if they incite religious, national or racial hatred or intolerance. This change came after the opening of two Bulgarian clubs - one named after Ivan Mihailov and the other named after Tsar Boris III. There was also an attempt to register a third club, named after Tsar Ferdinand I. After the opening of the two clubs, protests were organized and the clubs were attacked. The Commission for Protection against Discrimination concluded that the club names discriminate against the Macedonian public on national and ethnic grounds. The Commission was referred by the Association of Fighters the National Liberation War and the anti-fascist war. According to the Bulgarian co-chairman of the common Bulgarian-Macedonian historical commission Angel Dimitrov, the arguments for these changes remind him of the Law for the Protection of Macedonian National Honour, which allowed the sentencing of Yugoslav citizens from SR Macedonia for pro-Bulgarian leanings. Per Dimitrov, this shows that the Macedonians still use propaganda from the early times of Communist Yugoslavia. The leader of the Cultural Club in Bitola was accused of inciting xenophobia and ethnic hatred after publishing quotes by Ivan Mihailov on the club’s Facebook page. In 2025 he was sentenced to one-year prison suspended sentence with a two-year probation period.

=== Ethnically motivated attacks ===
On 5 June 2022, the entrance of the "Vancho Mihaylov" club was set on fire. The attacker, Lambe Alabakovski was swiftly apprehended and was given a 6 months suspended sentence. On 12 October 2022, the sign above the front door of the "Boris III" cultural club in Ohrid was smashed. On 20 November 2022, the glass façade of the same club was smashed by three masked men throwing stones, an incident that was followed by gun fire opened at the club from a car on 22 November. On 30 January 2022, the car of the Chairman of the Association of Macedonian-Bulgarian Friendship in Skopje was vandalised. On 20 January 2023, the secretary of the club in Ohrid was attacked. Three suspects have been apprehended, one of them has Bulgarian citizenship. On 8 February 2023, the Ohrid District's Attorney charged the detainees with an "ethnically-motivated hate crime". The motive "ethnically-motivated hate crime" before the court was not proven, and the two defendants received an effective 8-month prison for inflicting severe bodily injury. The President of North Macedonia Stevo Pendarovski condemned the incident and stated that certain political subjects in Bulgaria have used this case for their political goals. Similar expression to the incident was given by Daniel Lorer, current Member of the National Assembly of Bulgaria and former Bulgarian Minister of Innovation and Growth, where he claimed that the incident has been politicized.

== See also ==
- Ethnic Macedonians in Bulgaria
- Macedonian Question
- Macedonian Bulgarians
- Bulgaria–North Macedonia relations
- Bulgarian Cultural Club – Skopje
