= Radko Knoll =

Hill in South Shetland Islands, Antarctica

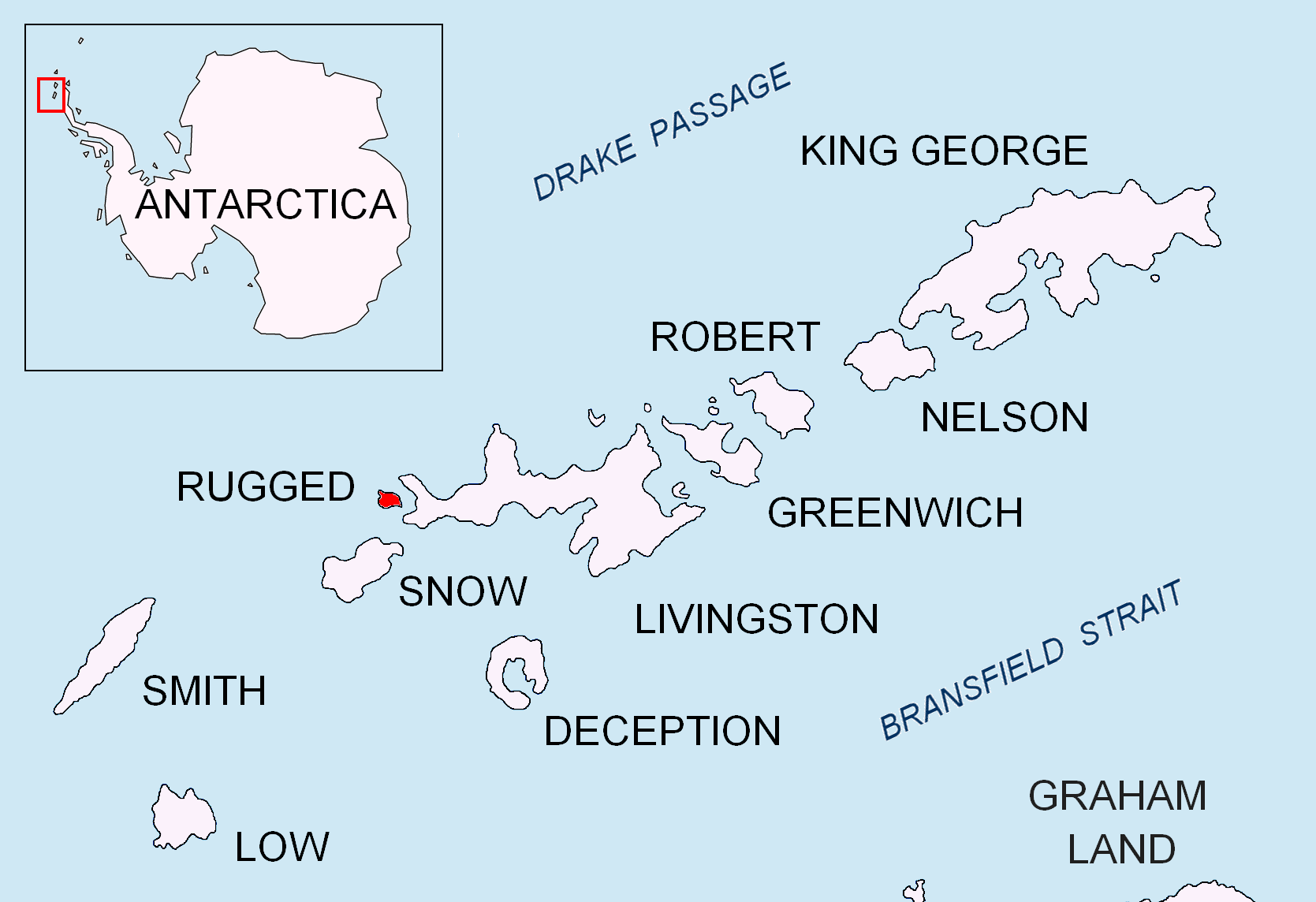
Location of Rugged Island in the South Shetland Islands.

Topographic map of Livingston Island and Smith Island.

Radko Knoll (Bulgarian: Радкова Могила, ‘Radkova Mogila’ \'rad-ko-va mo-'gi-la\) is a rocky hill rising to 102 m on the north coast of Smyadovo Cove in the northwest of Rugged Island in the South Shetland Islands, Antarctica. It is situated 830 m south-southeast of Cape Sheffield and 860 m north-northeast of Ugain Point.

The knoll is named for Ivan ‘Radko’ Mihaylov (1896–1990), leader of the Bulgarian liberation movement in Macedonia.

== Location ==
Radko Knoll is located at 62°37′14.7″S 61°17′30.8″W. Spanish mapping in 1992 and Bulgarian in 2009.

== Maps ==
- Península Byers, Isla Livingston. Mapa topográfico a escala 1:25000. Madrid: Servicio Geográfico del Ejército, 1992.
- L.L. Ivanov. Antarctica: Livingston Island and Greenwich, Robert, Snow and Smith Islands. Scale 1:120000 topographic map. Troyan: Manfred Wörner Foundation, 2009. ISBN 978-954-92032-6-4
- Antarctic Digital Database (ADD). Scale 1:250000 topographic map of Antarctica. Scientific Committee on Antarctic Research (SCAR). Since 1993, regularly upgraded and updated.
- L.L. Ivanov. Antarctica: Livingston Island and Smith Island. Scale 1:100000 topographic map. Manfred Wörner Foundation, 2017. ISBN 978-619-90008-3-0
