= Kokalyane Point =

Point on the west coast of Rugged Island in the South Shetland Islands, Antarctica

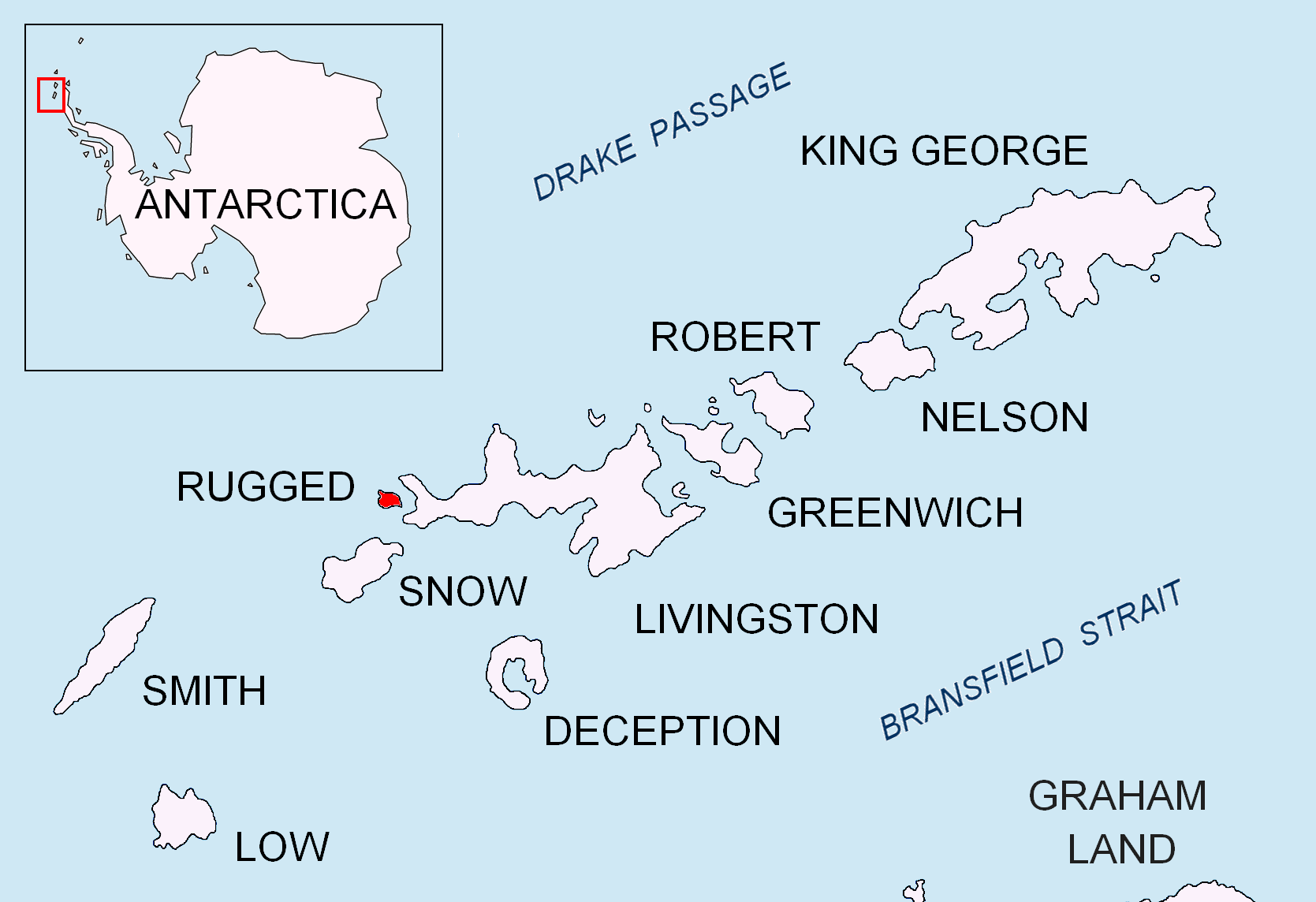
Location of Rugged Island in the South Shetland Islands.

Topographic map of Livingston Island and Smith Island

Kokalyane Point (Bulgarian: нос Кокаляне, ‘Nos Kokalyane’ \'nos ko-'ka-lya-ne\) is the point on the west coast of Rugged Island in the South Shetland Islands, Antarctica forming the south side of the entrance to Bogomil Cove. Situated 810 m north-northwest of Benson Point, 970 m south of Ugain Point and 2.51 km south of Cape Sheffield.

The point is named after the settlement of Kokalyane in western Bulgaria.

== Location ==
Kokalyane Point is located at 62°38′10.9″S 61°17′47″W, according to Spanish mapping in 1992 and Bulgarian mapping in 2009.

== Maps ==
- Península Byers, Isla Livingston. Mapa topográfico a escala 1:25000. Madrid: Servicio Geográfico del Ejército, 1992.
- L.L. Ivanov. Antarctica: Livingston Island and Greenwich, Robert, Snow and Smith Islands. Scale 1:120000 topographic map. Troyan: Manfred Wörner Foundation, 2009. ISBN 978-954-92032-6-4
- Antarctic Digital Database (ADD). Scale 1:250000 topographic map of Antarctica. Scientific Committee on Antarctic Research (SCAR). Since 1993, regularly upgraded and updated.
- L.L. Ivanov. Antarctica: Livingston Island and Smith Island. Scale 1:100000 topographic map. Manfred Wörner Foundation, 2017. ISBN 978-619-90008-3-0
