= Bulgarian Cultural Club – Skopje =

Non-governmental organization

Club's logo

The Bulgarian Cultural Club – Skopje (Macedonian: Бугарски културен клуб – Скопје) is a non-governmental organization in the Republic of North Macedonia established on 4 May 2008, and registered on 22 May 2008. Its executive board is chaired by Lazar Mladenov. The organization has local branches in Štip, Bitola, and other cities.

== Mission ==
The Club's mission is to foster changes and awareness in the Republic of Macedonia about the necessity for bringing closer of, and inter-cultural tolerance between the cultures of the neighbouring countries: Republic of Bulgaria and Republic of North Macedonia.

== Activities ==
Representatives of the Club took part in a public debate on the integration of ethnic minority communities held in Strumica, gathered and publicized data on some burial locations and graves of Bulgarian militaries killed in World War I on the territory of the present Republic of Macedonia. The organization is campaigning for the protection and restoration of the Bulgarian cultural monuments in the Republic of Macedonia. The Club took position on the issue of naming dispute with Greece, human rights issues related to Macedonian Bulgarians, and on the issue of a controversial encyclopedia published in 2009 by the Macedonian Academy of Sciences and Arts (MANU).

The Bulgarian Cultural Club – Skopje has published reports on the ongoing human rights violations and intolerance towards citizens of Bulgarian ethnicity in the context of European and Atlantic integration of the Republic of Macedonia, including the ethnic-based harassment of Club activists such as Miroslav Rizinski and Mile Yovanoski.

The Club proposed to the Mayor of Ohrid the erection of a monument commemorating the 2009 Lake Ohrid boat accident in which 15 Bulgarian tourists were killed with many more saved by nearby vessels.

The Bulgarian Cultural Club – Skopje took also a position on the "insufficient care for the Bulgarian science, research and innovation," and controversial intentions of the Bulgarian government perceived as a step towards the closure of the Bulgarian Academy of Sciences.

The Club in 2011 announced that they may invite the Bulgarian Orthodox Church to restore its Macedonian Diocese in service to the Bulgarians in the Republic of Macedonia (now North Macedonia).

== See also ==
- Macedonian Bulgarians
- Bulgarians in North Macedonia
- Radko Association
