= Kokalyane =

Kokalyane Кокаляне
- Village
- Location of Kokalyane
- Coordinates: 42°34′43″N 23°24′54″E
- Country: Bulgaria
- Provinces (Oblast): Sofia City

Government
  - Mayor: Aleksandur Borisov (GERB)

Area
  - Total: 15.598 km^{2} (6.022 sq mi)
- Elevation: 713 m (2,339 ft)

Population (2007-01-01)
  - Total: 1,859
  - Density: 119.2/km^{2} (308.7/sq mi)
- Time zone: UTC+2 (EET)
  - Summer (DST): UTC+3 (EEST)
- Postal Code: 1191

Kokalyane (Bulgarian: Кокаляне) is a village in the municipality of Sofia, in the district of Pancharevo in Bulgaria. As of 2007 it has 1,859 residents. The village is situated at the foothills of the Vitosha mountain, 18 km from the center of Sofia. The ruins of the Urvich fortress, connected with the fall of the Bulgarian Empire to the Ottomans in the end of the 14th century and the legends about the last Emperor Ivan Shishman, are located in the vicinity of the village.

Kokalyane Point on Rugged Island in the South Shetland Islands, Antarctica is named after the village.

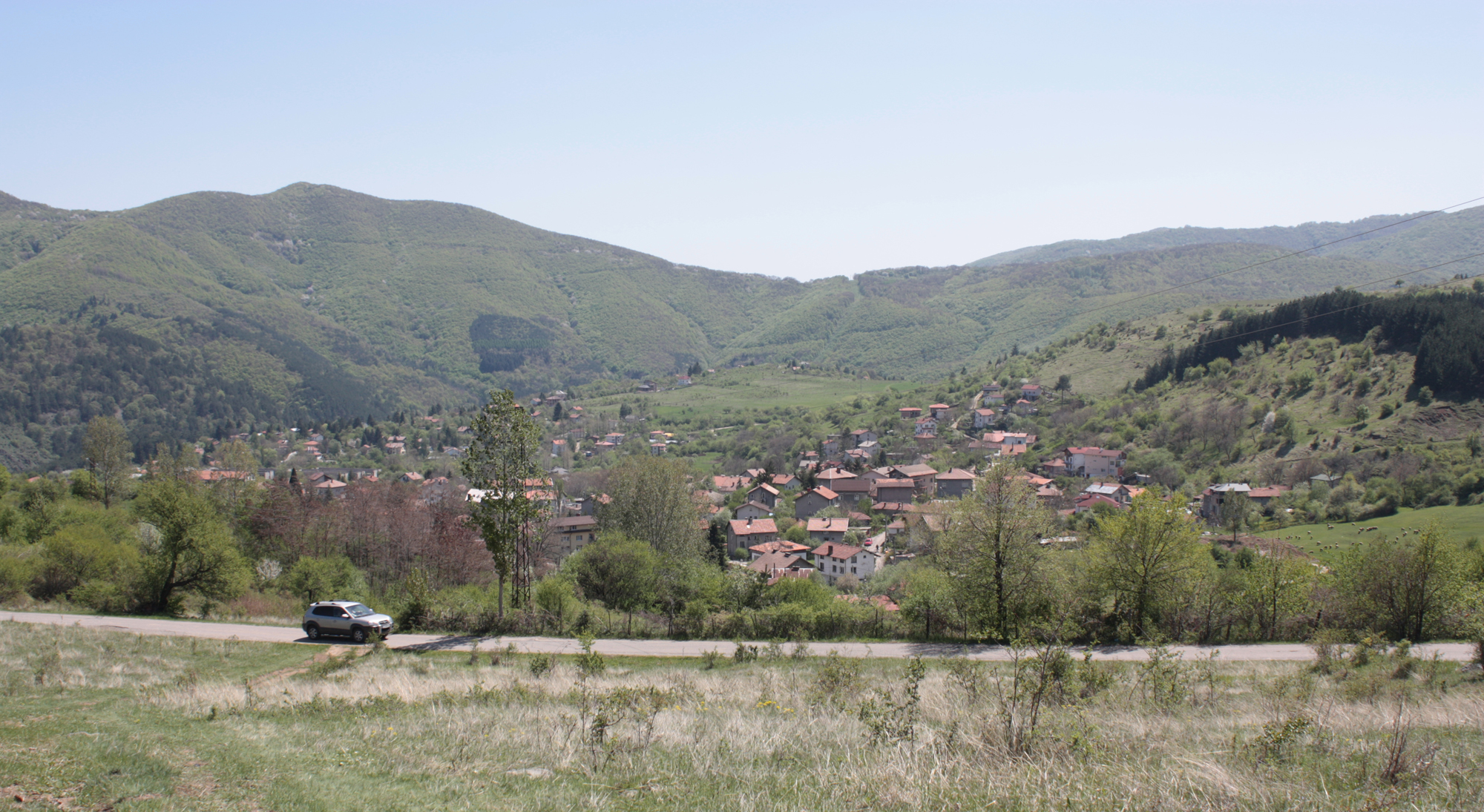
A view of Kolalyane from the surrounding hills

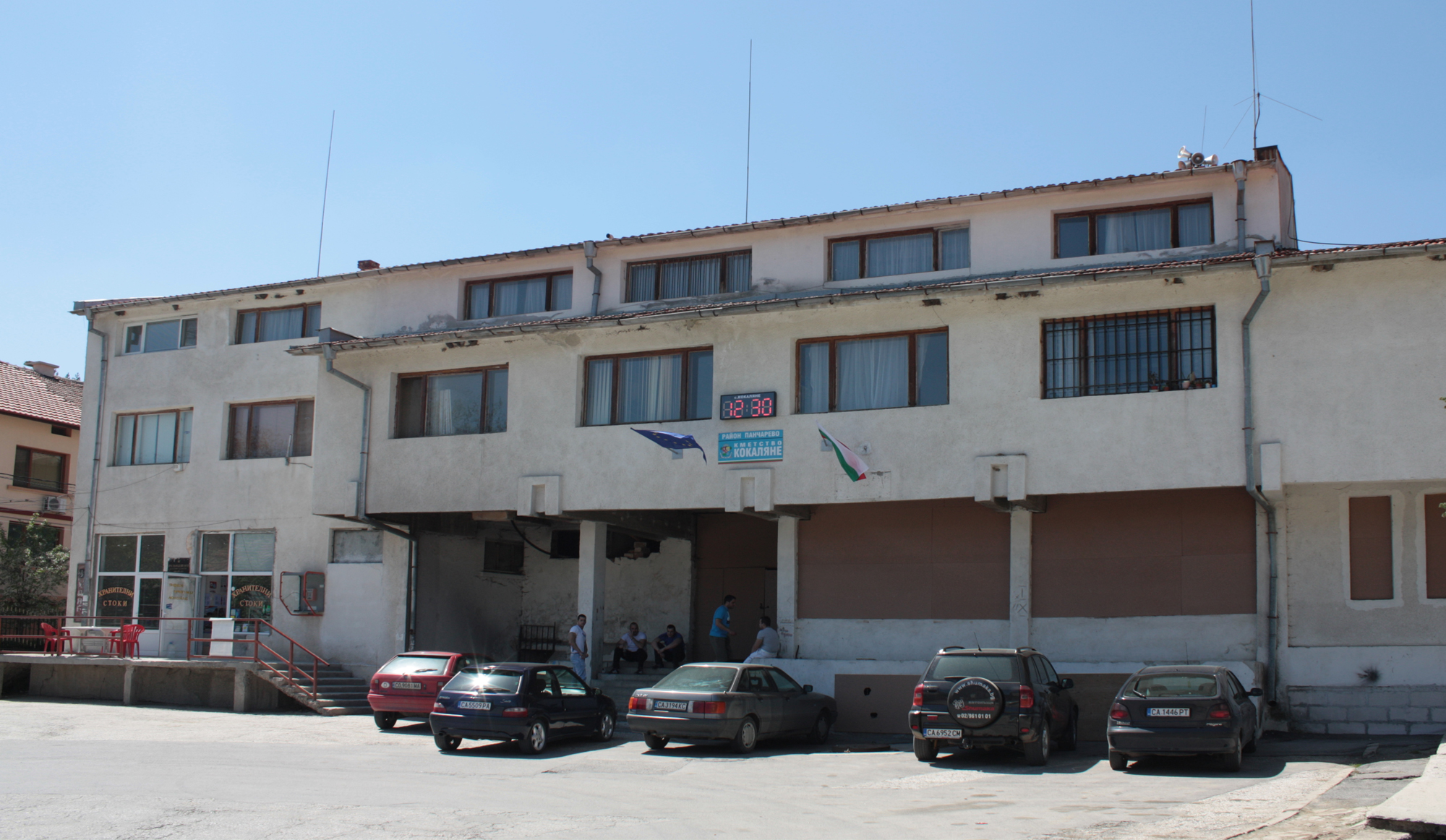
Kokalyane village hall

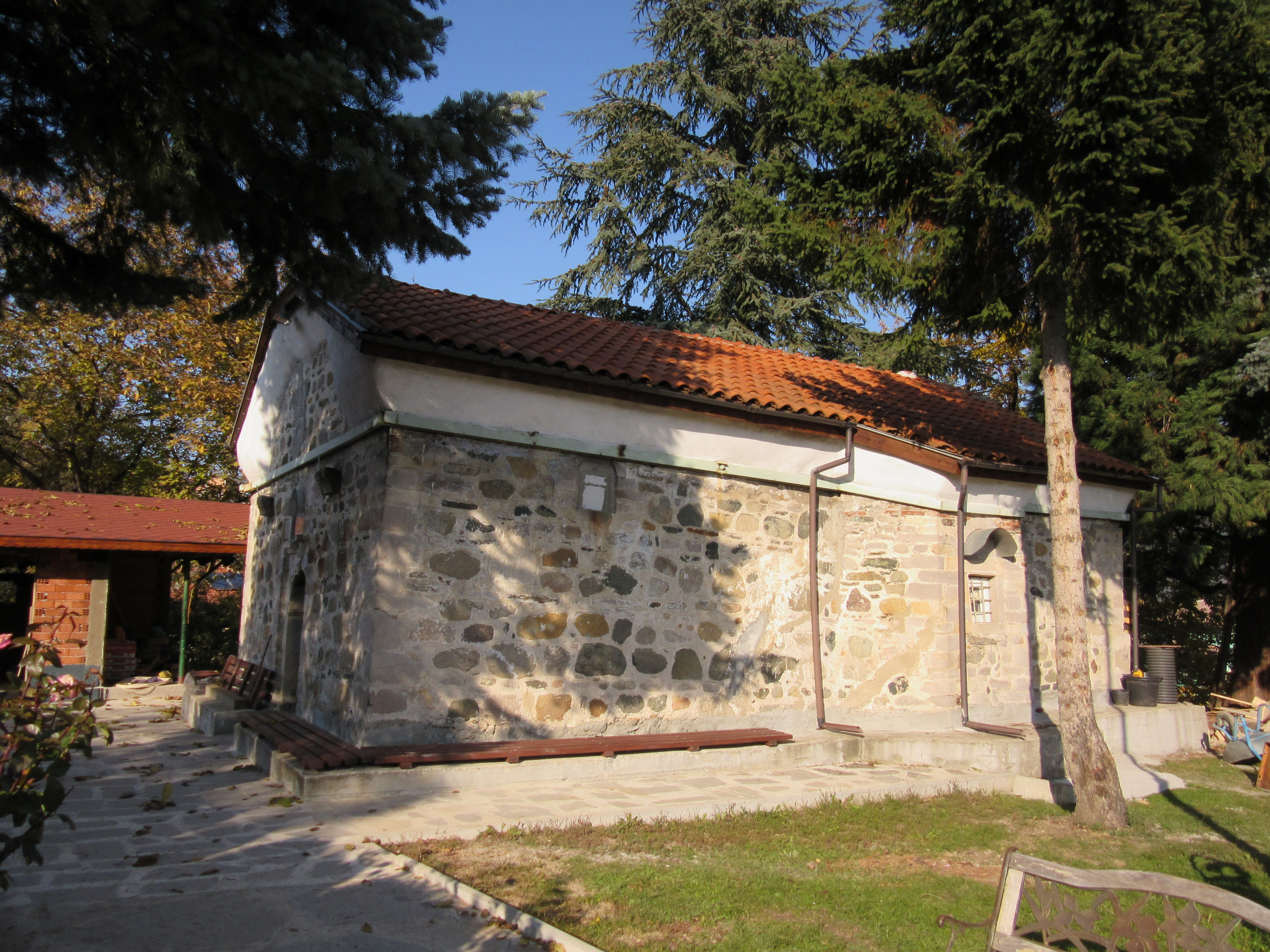
Kokalyane Saint George Church
