= Smyadovo Cove =

Cove in the South Shetland Islands, Antarctica

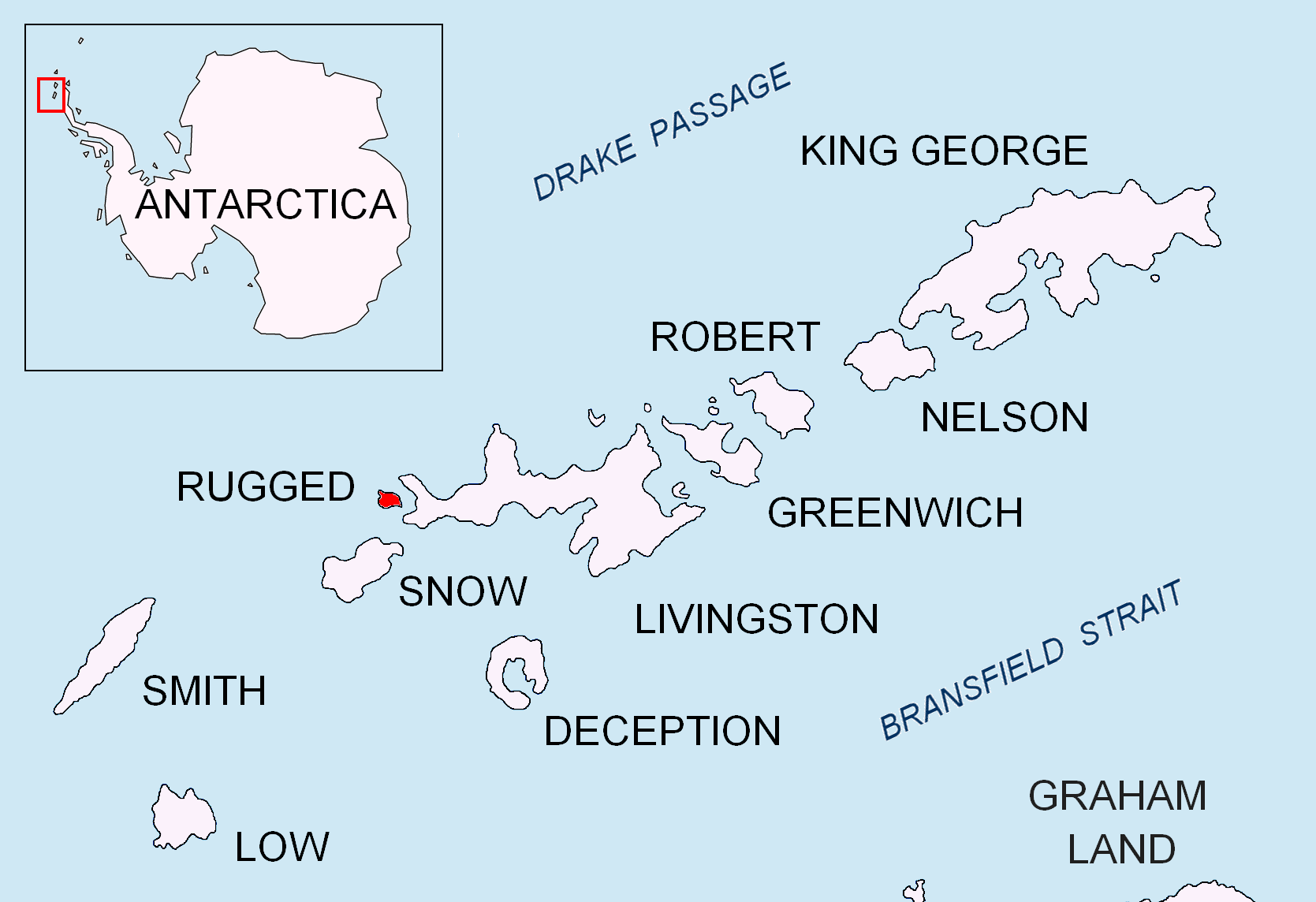
Location of Rugged Island in the South Shetland Islands.

Topographic map of Livingston Island and Smith Island

Smyadovo Cove (Bulgarian: залив Смядово, romanized: zaliv Smyadovo, IPA: [ˈzalif ˈsmʲadovo]) is a 900-meter wide cove indenting for 850 m the west coast of Rugged Island off the west coast of Byers Peninsula of Livingston Island in the South Shetland Islands, Antarctica. Entered north of Ugain Point and south of the southwest extremity of the small peninsula forming Cape Sheffield. Part of the cove's interior and entrance is occupied by Toledo Island and Prosechen Island.

The cove is named after the town of Smyadovo in northeastern Bulgaria.

== Location ==
Smyadovo Cove is centred at 62°37′23.4″S 61°17′30″W. British mapping in 1968, Spanish in 1992 and Bulgarian in 2005 and 2009.

== Maps ==
- Península Byers, Isla Livingston. Mapa topográfico a escala 1:25000. Madrid: Servicio Geográfico del Ejército, 1992.
- L.L. Ivanov et al. Antarctica: Livingston Island and Greenwich Island, South Shetland Islands. Scale 1:100000 topographic map. Sofia: Antarctic Place-names Commission of Bulgaria, 2005.
- L.L. Ivanov. Antarctica: Livingston Island and Greenwich, Robert, Snow and Smith Islands. Scale 1:120000 topographic map. Troyan: Manfred Wörner Foundation, 2010. ISBN 978-954-92032-9-5 (First edition 2009. ISBN 978-954-92032-6-4)
- South Shetland Islands: Livingston Island, Byers Peninsula. Scale 1:50000 satellite map. UK Antarctic Place-names Committee, 2010.
- Antarctic Digital Database (ADD). Scale 1:250000 topographic map of Antarctica. Scientific Committee on Antarctic Research (SCAR). Since 1993, regularly updated.
- L.L. Ivanov. Antarctica: Livingston Island and Smith Island. Scale 1:100000 topographic map. Manfred Wörner Foundation, 2017. ISBN 978-619-90008-3-0
