= Ivan Mihailov =

Bulgarian revolutionary in interwar Macedonia

Ivan Mihaylov
- Иван Михайлов
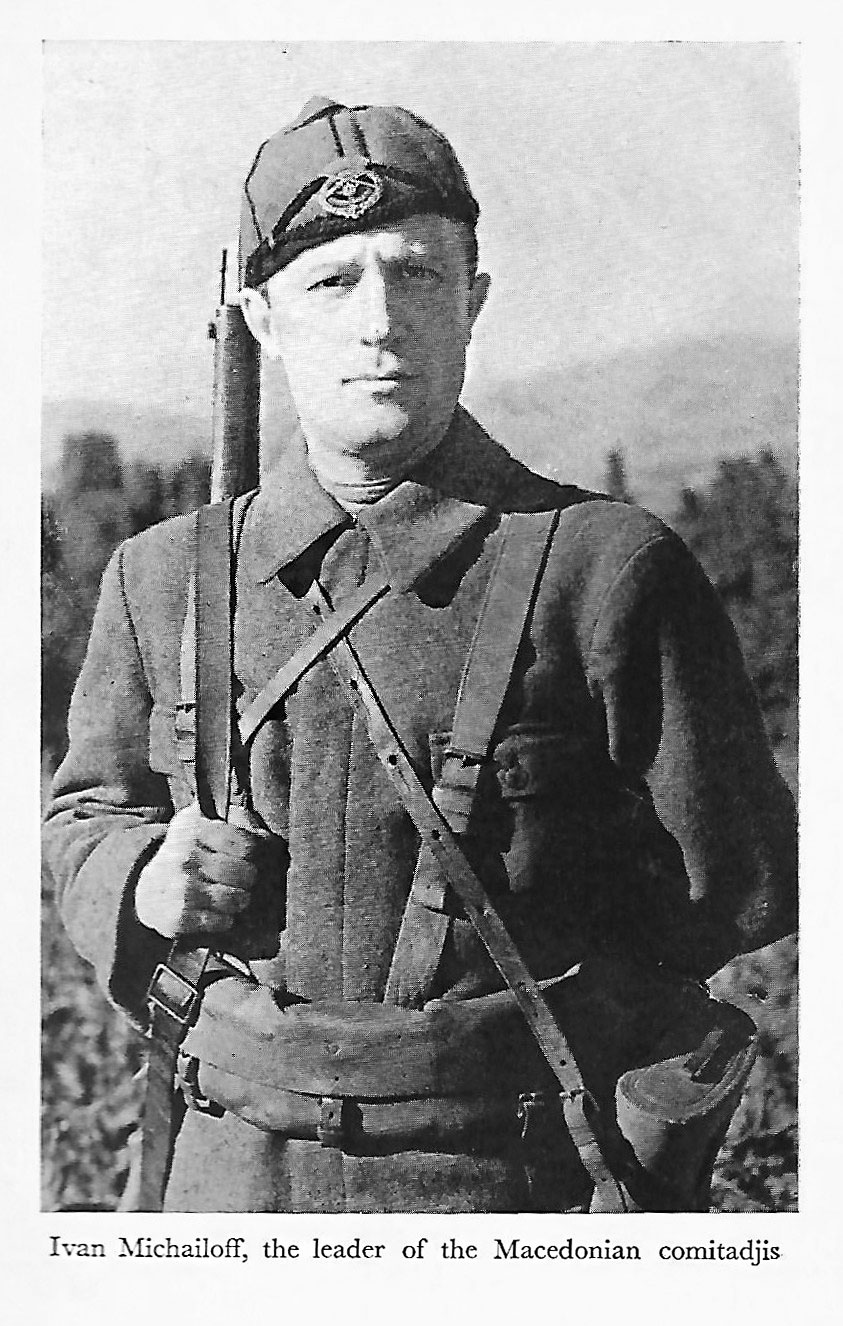

President of the Internal Macedonian Revolutionary Organization
- In office 24 December 1924 – 1934 Serving with Aleksandar Protogerov (until 1928)
- Preceded by: Todor Aleksandrov

Secretary General to the President of IMRO
- In office 1928 (alone) – 1934

Personal details
- Born: 26 August 1896 Novo Selo, Ottoman Empire
- Died: 5 September 1990 (aged 94) Rome, Italy
- Education: Bulgarian Men's High School of Thessaloniki
- Alma mater: Sofia University
- Occupation: Revolutionary, politician
- Profession: Lawyer

Ivan Mihaylov Gavrilov (Bulgarian: Иван Михайлов Гаврилов; Macedonian: Иван Михајлов Гаврилов; (Note: He is credited in English-language sources as Mihailov, while the Bulgarian and Macedonian transliteration schemes render it as Mihaylov and Mihajlov, respectively.) 26 August 1896 – 5 September 1990), also known as Vancho Mihaylov (Bulgarian: Ванчо Михайлов; Macedonian: Ванчо Михајлов), was a Macedonian Bulgarian revolutionary in interwar Macedonia and the last leader of the Internal Macedonian Revolutionary Organization (IMRO).

Under Mihaylov, IMRO became notoriously anti-communist and identified itself closely with Bulgarian nationalism, thus eliminating not only the enemies of the Bulgarian national idea in Macedonia but also its left-wing opponents within the Macedonian liberation movement. Mihaylov changed the organization's tactics from guerrilla campaigns to individual terrorist acts. Numerous attacks were carried out by IMRO against Yugoslav officials under his leadership, the most spectacular of which was the assassination of Alexander I of Yugoslavia, in collaboration with Croatian Ustaše. He actively cooperated with revanchist powers, such as Mussolini's Fascist Italy, Admiral Horthy's Hungary and Hitler's Nazi Germany. During the last stage of the war, he tried to realize IMRO's plan to create an Independent Macedonia but ultimately refused to move forward due to the lack of German military support and his reluctance to take a course that would lead to civil war.

During the Cold War, Mihaylov lived in Italy while the emigrant Macedonian Patriotic Organization in the US and Canada worked under his guidance on the old IMRO's goal of an independent Macedonia. This was acknowledged by a CIA report from 1953, which dubbed the MPO as "the US branch of the IMRO" and asserted that it acted as a money-raising organ to support Mihaylov's activity. At the beginning of the fall of communism and the breakup of Yugoslavia, only a month before his death in 1990, he kept insisting: "I am a Bulgarian from Macedonia" and "I would recommend to the young people in Macedonia to hold on to the fact that we have been Bulgarians for a thousand years." Mihaylov was considered a Bulgarophile traitor and fascist in Communist Yugoslavia. He is still regarded as such in what is today North Macedonia, while the organization he led is seen as a controversial Bulgarian organization because its ideas clash with the Yugoslav Macedonian nation-building narrative. According to Bulgarian historian Chavdar Marinov, Mihaylov was regarded as a Nazi collaborator in Communist Bulgaria. He was later partially rehabilitated there, supporting the Bulgarian narrative that negates the existence of a widespread Macedonian national identity before the end of World War II and he has been fully rehabilitated today.

Mihaylov is the author of four volumes of memoirs and a number of articles and pamphlets, such as "Macedonia: Switzerland of the Balkans", "Stalin and the Macedonian Question", as well as other materials describing the Macedonian struggle for freedom.

== Biography ==
=== Early years ===
Ivan Mihaylov was born on 26 August 1896 in the village of Novo Selo (today a quarter of Štip, North Macedonia), in the Kosovo vilayet of the Ottoman Empire. Mihaylov studied at the Bulgarian Men's High School in Thessaloniki up until the Second Balkan War (1913), when the school was closed by the new Greek administration. He later continued his schooling at a Serbian school in Skopje, then in the Kingdom of Serbia. A scholarship was offered to him by the Serbian Ministry of Education to pursue a degree at a European university, but he declined. During the First World War, he enlisted in the Bulgarian Army, which occupied the region at the time. After the end of the war, Mihaylov emigrated to Bulgaria, settling in Sofia. Here he began studying law at the Sofia University. It was at this time that he was offered to work as personal secretary to the then IMRO leader Todor Aleksandrov.

=== Leader of the IMRO ===
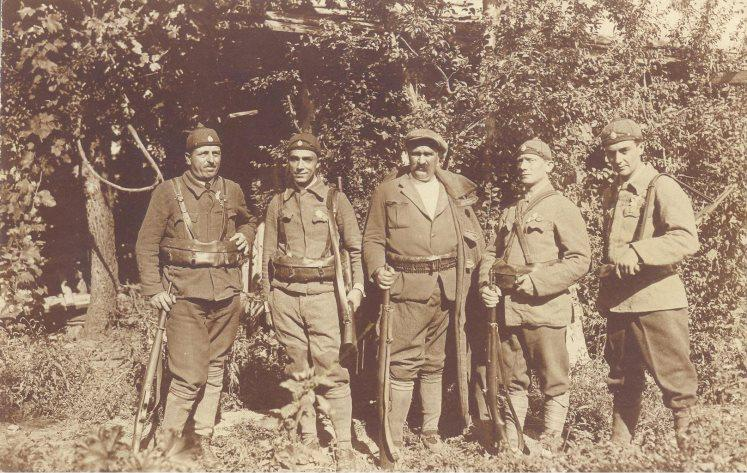
Mihaylov (second from the right) with other IMRO-comitadjis ca. 1924.

On 31 August 1924, Todor Aleksandrov was assassinated under unclear circumstances and IMRO soon came under the control of Mihaylov, who by then had become a prominent figure in Bulgarian politics.

IMRO's leadership was quick to blame Aleksandrov's death on the communists, while they claimed that Mihaylov may have actually been responsible for the murder. These events created friction between factions within the organization and led to several high-profile murders, including that of Petar Chaulev (who led the Ohrid uprising in 1913) in Milan.

During the interwar period, IMRO took action against several former members of IMRO's Sandanist (left-wing) faction. Gjorche Petrov was killed in Sofia in 1921. Todor Panitsa, who had killed the right-wing Boris Sarafov and Ivan Garvanov, was assassinated in Vienna in 1925 by Mihaylov's future wife, Mencha Karnichiu." Dimo Hadjidimov, Georgi Skrizhovski, Aleksandar Bujnov, Chudomir Kantardjiev, and many others were killed in a series of murders, all taking place in 1925.

Mihaylov's group of young IMRO cadres soon fell into conflict with the older members of the organization. The latter were in favour of the old tactics of incursions by armed bands into Yugoslavia and Greece, whereas the former favoured more flexible tactics, with smaller terrorist cells carrying selective assassinations of public figures.

The conflict grew into a leadership struggle, which led Mihaylov to order the assassination in 1928 of a rival leader of the older faction, General Aleksandar Protogerov, sparking a fratricidal war between the "Mihaylovists" and the "Protogerovists". The less numerous and ill-equipped Protogerovists allied themselves with Yugoslavia and certain Bulgarian military circles as Zveno, who favoured rapprochement with Yugoslavia.

That period led to the intensification of the armed struggle of the organization in Aegean and Vardar Macedonia. A total of 63 terrorist acts and attacks on bridges, warehouses, Serbian police stations, and military targets were carried out between 1922 and 1930, with the number of assassinated Serbian officials and collaborators numbering in the thousands.

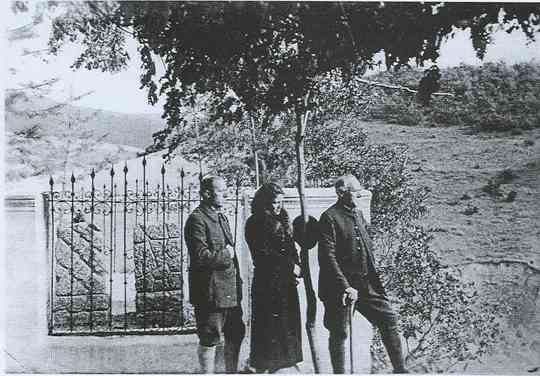
Ivan Mihaylov, his wife Mencha Karnicheva, and Marko Doshen at the grave of Todor Alexandrov in 1933

IMRO had de facto control of Pirin Macedonia and acted as a "state within a state", which it used as a base for hit-and-run attacks against Yugoslavia with the unofficial support of Bulgaria and later Fascist Italy, while also establishing close links with the Croatian Ustaše movement. Numerous assassinations were carried out by IMRO activists in several countries, the majority of which occurred in Yugoslavia. The most spectacular of these was the assassination of King Alexander I of Yugoslavia and the French Foreign Minister Louis Barthou in Marseille in 1934, in collaboration with Ante Pavelić.

IMRO's constant fratricidal killings and assassinations abroad prompted some within the Bulgarian military to attempt to crush the organization after the Bulgarian coup d'état of 1934. In 1934, Mihaylov fled to Turkey and ordered his supporters not to resist the Bulgarian army and to accept the disarmament peacefully, potentially avoiding a civil war or foreign invasion. Many inhabitants of Pirin Macedonia met this disbandment with satisfaction because it was perceived as relief from an unlawful and quite often brutal parallel authority. Mihaylov had nine life sentences and three death sentences in Bulgaria.

Even though IMRO's main goal had always been the creation of an independent Macedonian state, some Bulgarian governments had tolerated it since their goal had been the liberation of Macedonia, which they considered Bulgarian land, from Greek and Yugoslav occupation. As a result of this, IMRO had built an extensive network in Pirin Macedonia and in the other parts of Bulgaria, which was used to provide financing for the organization and an operational base from which the incursions into Yugoslavia and Greece were conducted.

While in exile, IMRO was kept alive by members in various countries worldwide but ceased to be an active force in Macedonia except for brief periods during the Second World War.

=== 1934 – 1944 ===
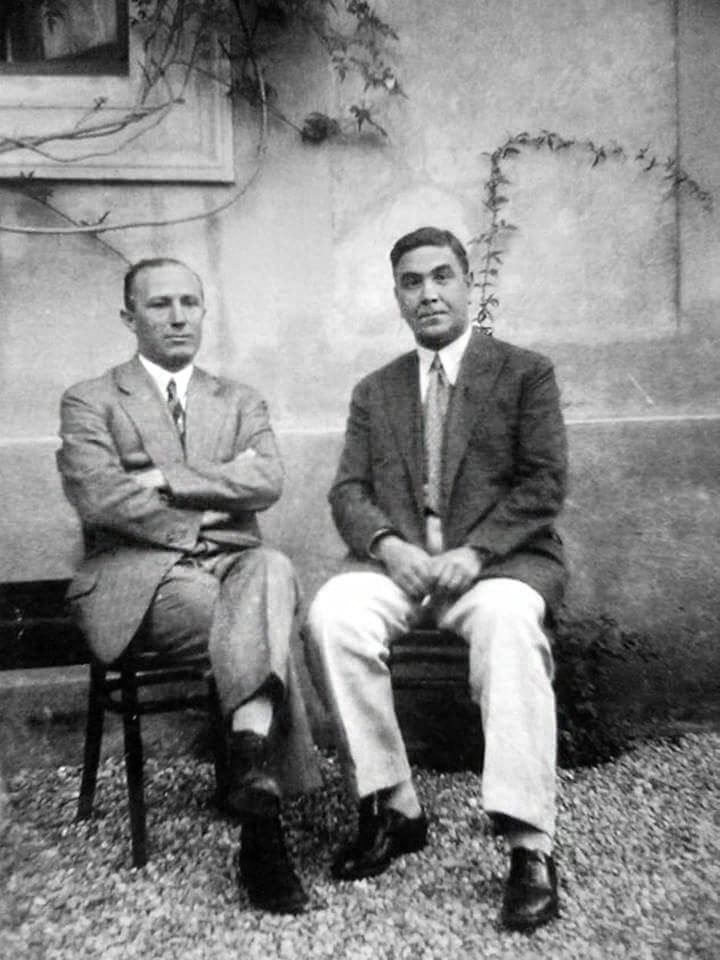
Mihaylov with Ante Pavelic during WWII.

After 1934, Mihaylov lived in Turkey, Poland and Hungary and finally settled in the Croatian capital Zagreb, which at that time was part of the Independent State of Croatia, a fascist puppet-state. In 1941, during World War II, most of Vardar Macedonia and a half of Greek Macedonia were annexed by Bulgaria and along with various other regions, becoming part of Greater Bulgaria. Mihaylov refused to return to the Bulgarian-occupied part of Macedonia and remained in Croatia until the end of the war. With his help in 1943, some armed detachments – Ohrana, which included Bulgarian Slav-speakers in Italian- and German-occupied Greek Macedonia were organised. It was apparent that Mihaylov had broader plans which envisaged the creation of a Macedonian state under a German control. It was also anticipated that the IMRO volunteers would form the core of the armed forces of a future Independent Macedonia in addition to providing administration and education in the Florina, Kastoria and Edessa districts.

=== Refusal to create a pro-Nazi Puppet State ===
In August 1943, Ivan Mihaylov left Zagreb incognito for Germany where he was to visit the main headquarters of Hitler and the headquarters of the Sicherheitsdienst, where he spoke to Hitler and Himmler and other top German leaders. From the scant available German information, it is apparent that Mihaylov received consent to create three battalions consisting of volunteers armed with German weapons and munitions. Moreover, these battalions were to be under the operative command and disposal of Reichsfuhrer of SS Heinrich Himmler. Additionally, in Sofia talks were held between high-ranking functionaries of the SS and the IMRO Central Committee members. Despite the confidential character of the negotiations between Mihaylov and the Sicherheitsdienst, the Bulgarian government obtained certain information about them. On 2 September 1944 Bulgaria ordered the withdrawal of its troops from Macedonia. Detailed German telegrams indicate that on 3 September 1944 Mihaylov was flown from Zagreb to Sofia. A German telegram from 1:07 am on 5 September indicates that Hitler re-ordered the establishment of a puppet state in Macedonia. Mihaylov was transported to Skopje on the evening of 5 September "to see what can be saved". Another telegram repeating the Führer's order came in at 2 am on 6 September. On 6 September, Mihaylov declined the offer to lead an independent 'puppet state' for inability to get local support. The German diplomats in Skopje reported to Berlin that the attempt to establish a puppet state had failed. On 8 September 1944 Germany closed its Consulate in Skopje, and Mihaylov with his wife, together staff from the German consulate, left Skopje. Nevertheless, the same day, right-wing IMRO nationalists declared independence.

=== During the Cold War ===
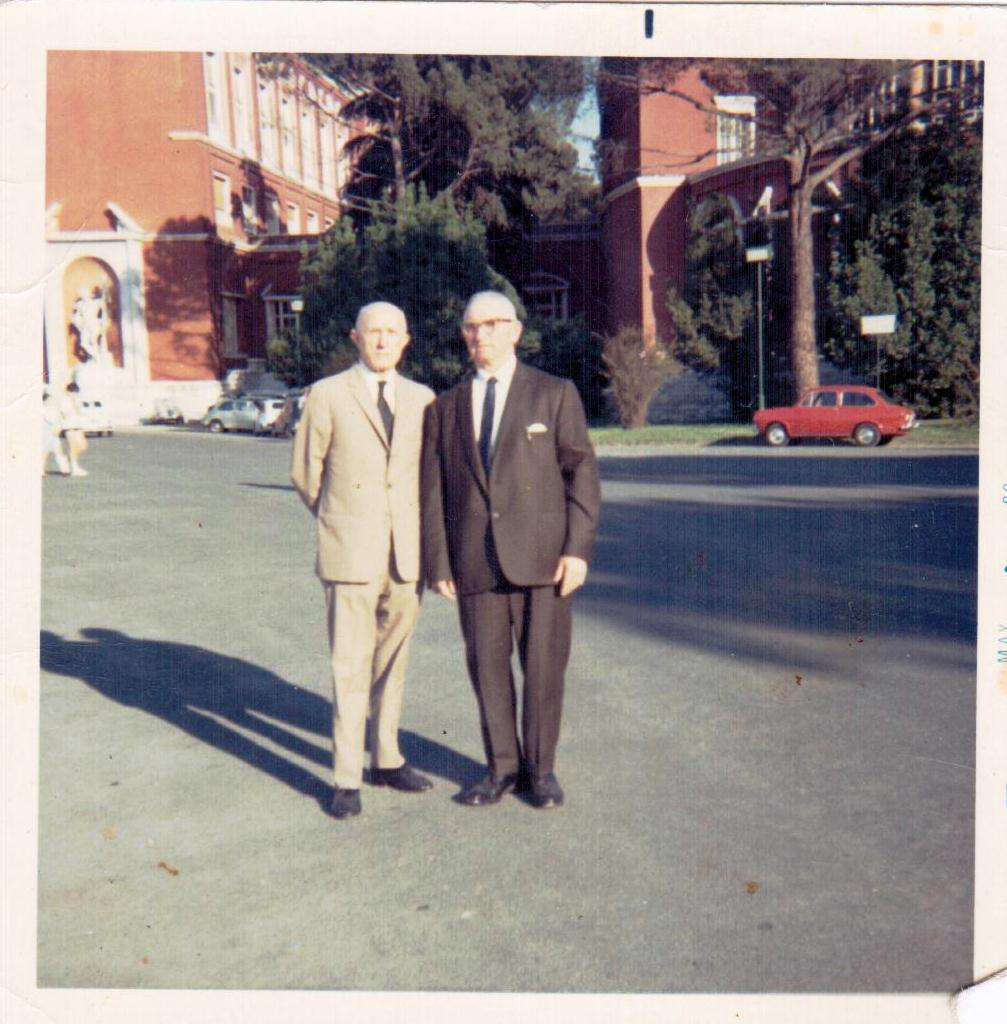
Mihaylov (to the left) with the former IMRO activist Pandeli Stoyanov in Rome (1969).

In 1944, he was forced to flee again, this time to Italy. The Bulgarian communist leader Georgi Dimitrov ordered the assassination of Mihaylov. The new regimes in Bulgaria, Yugoslavia and Greece persecuted his followers as fascists and traitors. After World War II the ruling Bulgarian Communists declared the population in Bulgarian Pirin Macedonia as ethnic Macedonian and teachers were brought in from Yugoslavia to teach the locals in the recently codified Macedonian language. The organizations of the IMRO in Bulgaria were completely destroyed. Former IMRO members were hunted by the communist Militsiya and many of them were imprisoned, repressed, exiled or killed. On the other hand, former Mihaylovists were also persecuted by the Belgrade-controlled authorities on accusations of collaboration with the Bulgarian occupation, Bulgarian nationalism, anti-communist and anti-Yugoslav activities, etc. Josip Broz Tito and Georgi Dimitrov worked on a project to merge Bulgaria and Yugoslavia into a Balkan Federative Republic under control of the Balkan Communist Federation. These policies were reversed after the Tito–Stalin split in June 1948, when Bulgaria, being subordinated to the interests of the Soviet Union took a stance against Yugoslavia. After the Second World War many former "Ohranists" were convicted of military crimes as collaborationists. Also, after the Greek Civil War many of these people were expelled from Greece and tortured as Bulgarians.

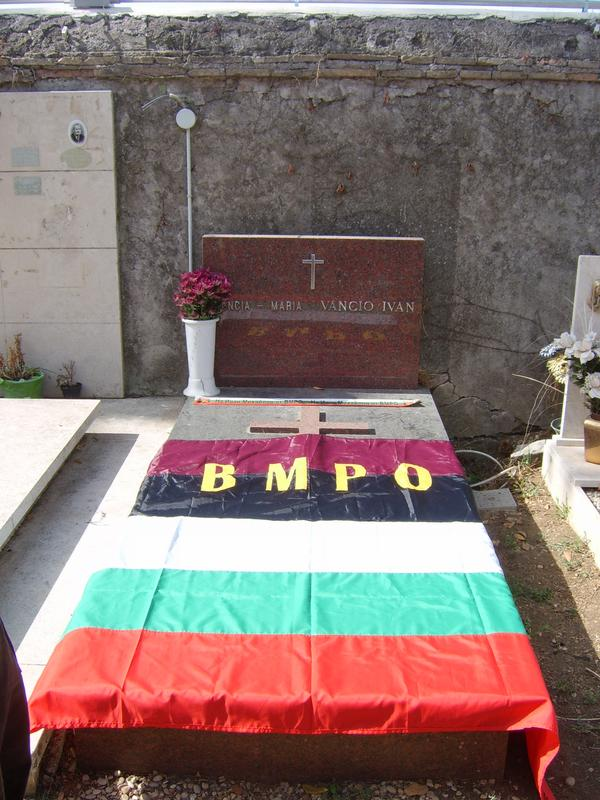
Mihaylov's grave in the Byzantine rite graveyard of Grottaferrata, Italy

Gradually Ivan Mihaylov was established as a legal political figure and author of the ideology of the Bulgarian national liberation movement in Macedonia. This fact allowed for a close political alliance between Ivan Mihaylov and the Macedonian Patriotic Organization in the United States, Canada and Australia in the late 1940s. Mihaylov became the emigrants' ideological leader, and the MPO supplied the people and funds for the political struggle. With the help of the United Nations and various humanitarian organizations, the human rights of Bulgarians repressed by Tito in Yugoslavia were protected. In order to provide a basis for the Bulgarian emigrant movement and create a historical record, Ivan Mihaylov started writing his memoirs from the 1950s to the 1970s, which the MPO's Central Committee published in four large volumes. These works provide serious proof of Bulgarian national interests from the 50s to the 70s. After the change of Bulgarian policy toward the Macedonian question in the late 1950s, Mihaylov was largely forgotten about and according to some sources even in the 1970s and 1980s the Committee for State Security supported his pro-Bulgarian and anti-Macedonistic political activity. However, in September 1989, Boris Vishinsky, a Skopje journalist, decided to try and interview Mihaylov. He expressed his hope for such an interview on Radio Vatican, which contacted Anton Popov, a journalist at the same station. Popov was one of the persons abroad that Ivan Mihaylov trusted most. Sensing the impending collapse of Yugoslavia, he consented to such an interview, but only provided written answers. It then came as a real shock for many in Bulgaria when in 1990 at the end of the cold war, the popular TV anchor Kevork Kevorkyan contacted Mihaylov, thought by many to be long since deceased, and recorded a long interview with him. After the long years of official propaganda, he was still thought of as an "enemy of the people" by many. This was Mihaylov's last interview. He died in Rome on 5 September 1990.

=== Legacy ===
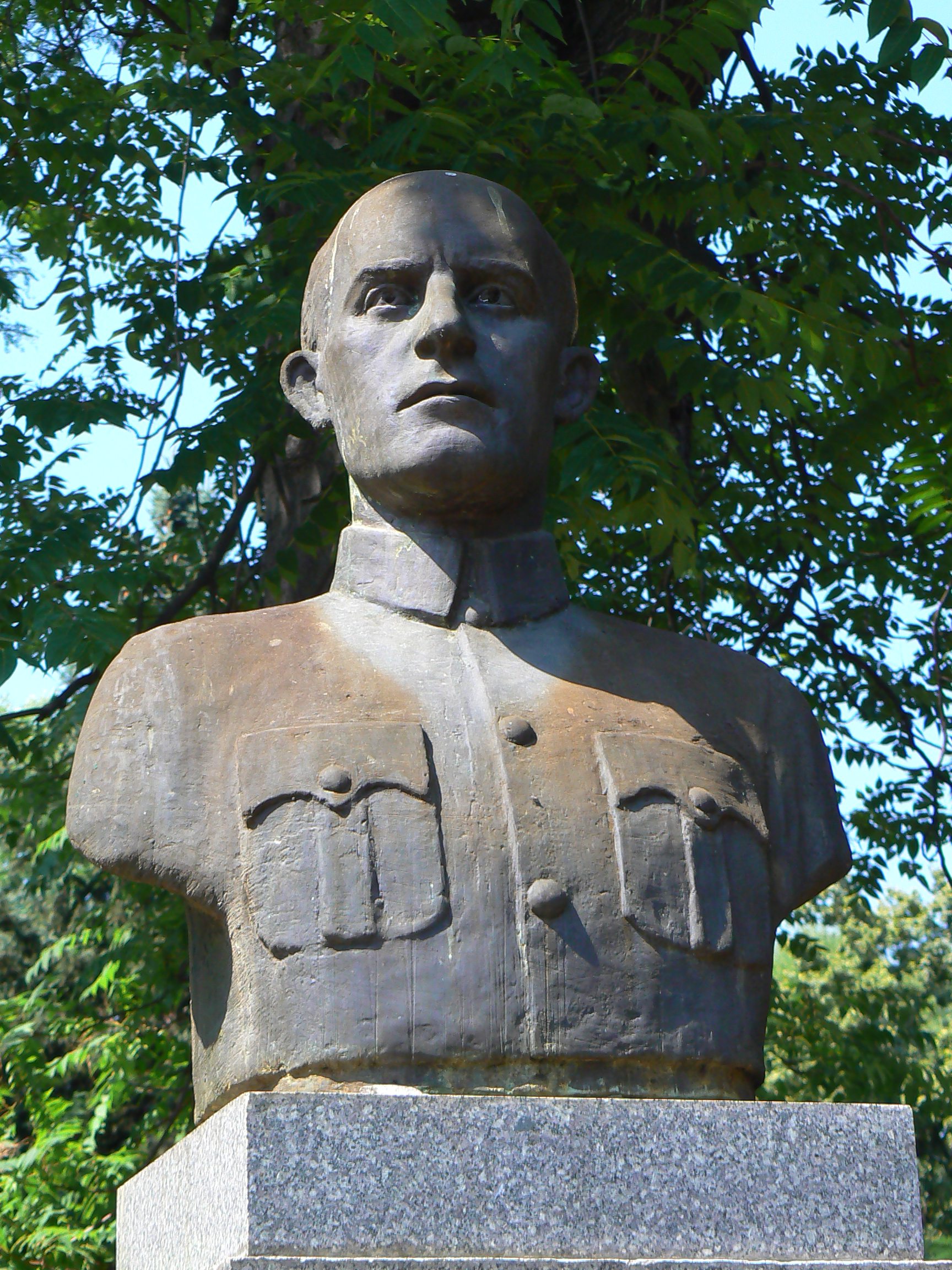
Ivan Mihaylov's monument in Sofia

Although the Internal Macedonian Revolutionary Organization (IMRO) was no longer active, Mihaylov remained the leader of the Macedonian Liberation Movement and was supported by the Macedonian Patriotic Organization of US and Canada, of Fort Wayne, Indiana. He wrote four books of memoirs and regularly wrote articles for The Macedonian Tribune, the oldest continuously published Macedonian émigré newspaper. Until the end of his life, Mihaylov continued his interest in the fate of the Macedonians (whom he considered ethnically Bulgarian) and was committed to an autonomous or independent Macedonian state.

In Bulgaria, Mihaylov is regarded as an important revolutionary from the third generation of freedom fighters who continued the struggle for political autonomy or independence in the Bulgarian-populated parts of Macedonia after the partition of most of the region of Macedonia between Serbia and Greece after the First World War. His memory is honoured and his name is taken from streets and schools in the country.

In North Macedonia, Ivan Mihaylov has been regarded as a controversial pro-Bulgarian revolutionary. The Constitutional court of the country banned in 2001 the Radko Association, a Bulgarian organization bearing the nickname of Ivan Mihaylov as separatist. In 2023 the Bulgarian Cultural Club in Bitola called "Ivan Mihailov", was banned by the authorities, while its leader was accused of inciting xenophobia and ethnic hatred after publishing quotes by Mihailov on the club's Facebook page. In 2025 he was sentenced to one-year prison suspended sentence with a two-year probation period.

Radko Knoll on Rugged Island in the South Shetland Islands, Antarctica, is named after Ivan "Radko" Mihaylov.

== Mihaylov and the Macedonian question ==
There are different opinions about Mihaylov's activity in Bulgaria, but scholars agree that he was a staunch defender of the idea of the strong Bulgarian character of the Slav-speaking population in Macedonia. He envisioned an independent united Macedonian multiethnic state with a predominantly ethnic Bulgarian population, a "Switzerland on the Balkans," as he wrote.

According to his personal secretary, Vida Boeva, he was constantly canvassing by means of petitions, letters of protest, and memos addressed to the UN from the Macedonian Patriotic Organisation, emphasizing that the Macedonian Republic was a colony of Serbia under another name.

Mihaylov declared that Macedonia is Bulgarian and that the Slavs in Macedonia are Bulgarian. The people that ruled Macedonia, he insisted, were either serbophiles or grecophiles. He believed that the Macedonians are part of the Bulgarian nation and that the founders of IMRO were people who accepted the idea of a San Stefano Bulgaria.

According to Macedonian historian Ivan Katardžiev, Mihaylov's interpretation of the term "Macedonian" was that it was a generalizing, regional term, including different ethnicities such as Bulgarians, Aromanians, and Albanians, but not ethnic Macedonians. Katardžiev regarded his IMRO as "a purely Bulgarian affair" and him as "a terrorist and an exponent of Bulgarian revanchism."

It appears that, during the Cold War, Mihaylov reconsidered his views on an independent Macedonia. He claimed in 1979 that SR Macedonia was nothing but a Yugoslav satellite state and even if it became completely independent, it would be harmful to Bulgaria. Her natural fate, he insisted, lies in its unification with Bulgaria.
