= Ugain Point =

Point on the west coast of Rugged Island in the South Shetland Islands, Antarctica

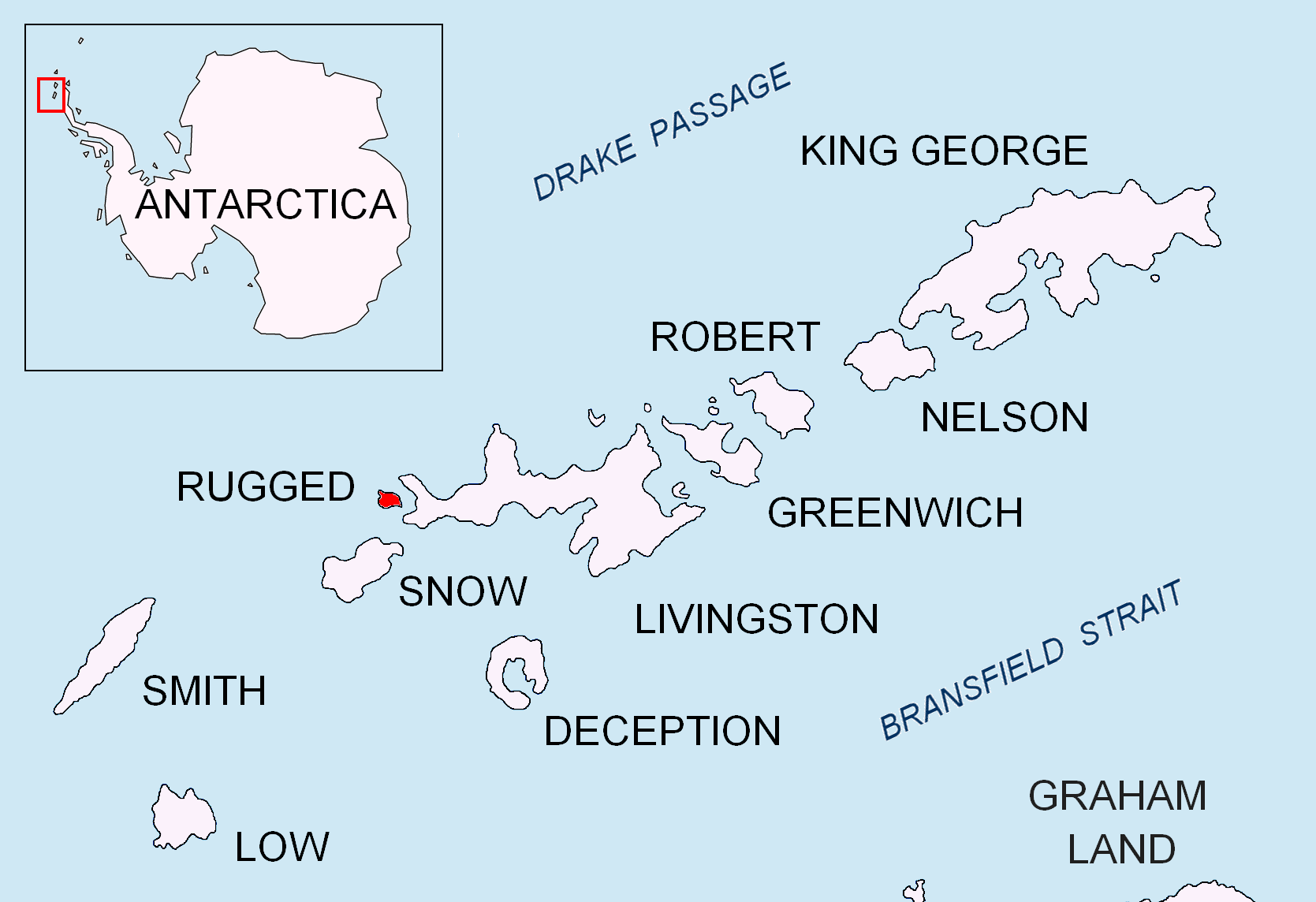
Location of Rugged Island in the South Shetland Islands.

Topographic map of Livingston Island and Smith Island

Ugain Point (Bulgarian: нос Угаин, ‘Nos Ugain’ \'nos u-ga-'in\) is the point on the west coast of Rugged Island in the South Shetland Islands, Antarctica separating Smyadovo Cove to the north and Bogomil Cove to the south. Situated 1.76 km north-northwest of Benson Point, 970 m north of Kokalyane Point and 1.55 km south of Cape Sheffield.

The point is named after the Bulgarian ruling dynasty of Ugain (8th century).

== Location ==
Ugain Point is located at 62°37′39.9″S 61°17′57″W. British mapping in 1968, Spanish in 1992, and Bulgarian in 2005, 2009 and 2010.

== Maps ==
- Península Byers, Isla Livingston. Mapa topográfico a escala 1:25000. Madrid: Servicio Geográfico del Ejército, 1992.
- L.L. Ivanov et al. Antarctica: Livingston Island and Greenwich Island, South Shetland Islands. Scale 1:100000 topographic map. Sofia: Antarctic Place-names Commission of Bulgaria, 2005.
- L.L. Ivanov. Antarctica: Livingston Island and Greenwich, Robert, Snow and Smith Islands. Scale 1:120000 topographic map. Troyan: Manfred Wörner Foundation, 2010. ISBN 978-954-92032-9-5 (First edition 2009. ISBN 978-954-92032-6-4)
- South Shetland Islands: Livingston Island, Byers Peninsula. Scale 1:50000 satellite map. UK Antarctic Place-names Committee, 2010.
- Antarctic Digital Database (ADD). Scale 1:250000 topographic map of Antarctica. Scientific Committee on Antarctic Research (SCAR). Since 1993, regularly updated.
- L.L. Ivanov. Antarctica: Livingston Island and Smith Island. Scale 1:100000 topographic map. Manfred Wörner Foundation, 2017. ISBN 978-619-90008-3-0
