= First statute of the IMRO =

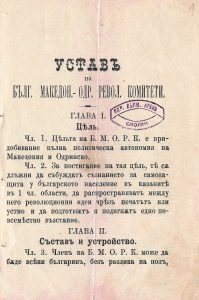
Excerpt from the statute of BMARC, (1894 or 1896; in Bulgarian language) Statute of the Bulgarian Macedonian-Adrianople Revolutionary Committees Chapter I. – Goal Art. 1. The goal of BMARC is to secure full political autonomy for the Macedonia and Adrianople regions . Art. 2. To achieve this goal they [the committees] shall raise the awareness of self-defense in the Bulgarian population in the regions mentioned in Art. 1., disseminate revolutionary ideas – printed or verbal, and prepare and carry on a general uprising. Chapter II. – Structure and Organization Art. 3. A member of BMARC can be any Bulgarian, independent of gender, ...

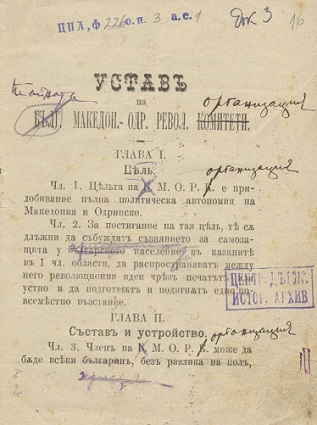
Excerpt from the draft of the statute of the SMARO made by hand on the statute of the BMARC by Gotse Delchev or Petar Poparsov discovered in Bulgaria. The Organization changed its name and dropped 'Bulgarian' from it, appealing to all dissatisfied elements, regardless of their nationality, to win through a revolution, political autonomy for Macedonia and Adrianople regions. According to Katardžiev, there is an overlapping of the text of the statutes of BMARC and that of SMARO, i.e. 8 from the 15 articles in the statute of the BMARC are identical to those in the statute of SMARO. Thus it is clear that when drafting one, the other was used.

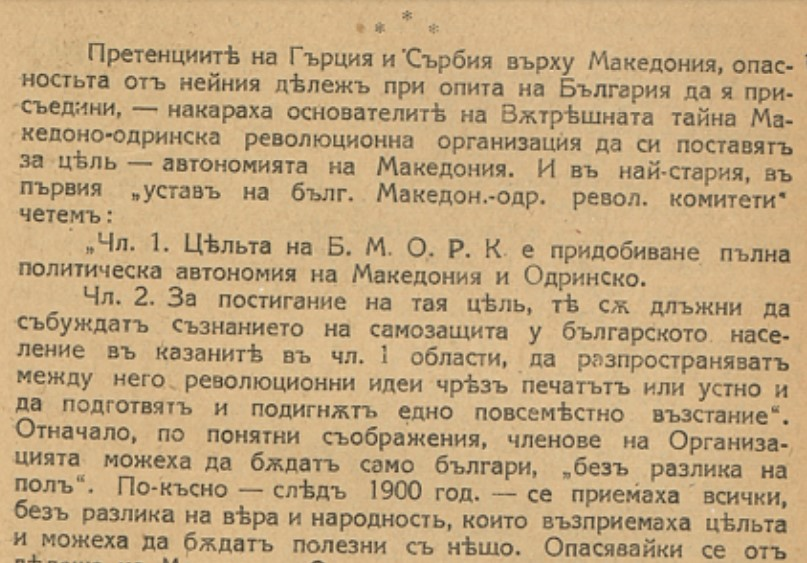
Excerpt from p. 5 of the article "The Wars and the Macedonian Question", published in 1922 in the magazine "Macedonia" by the IMRO revolutionary Georgi Bazhdarov (1875-1924). Here, the author insists that the first statute of the Organization, was that of BMARC. Verbatim are quoted Art. 1 and Art. 2 of the statute. The content of Art. 3 is partially quoted too. It is explained also that only after 1900 the Organization was opened to other nationalities besides Bulgarians.

Excerpt from page 69 of the unpublished book "Notes and Reflections on the Macedonian Nation" from 1959. The author is the activist of the left wing of IMRO Dimitar Popevtimov. He insists that the first name of IMRO according to the first statute of the organization from 1894 was BMARC, and only Bulgarians could participate in it.

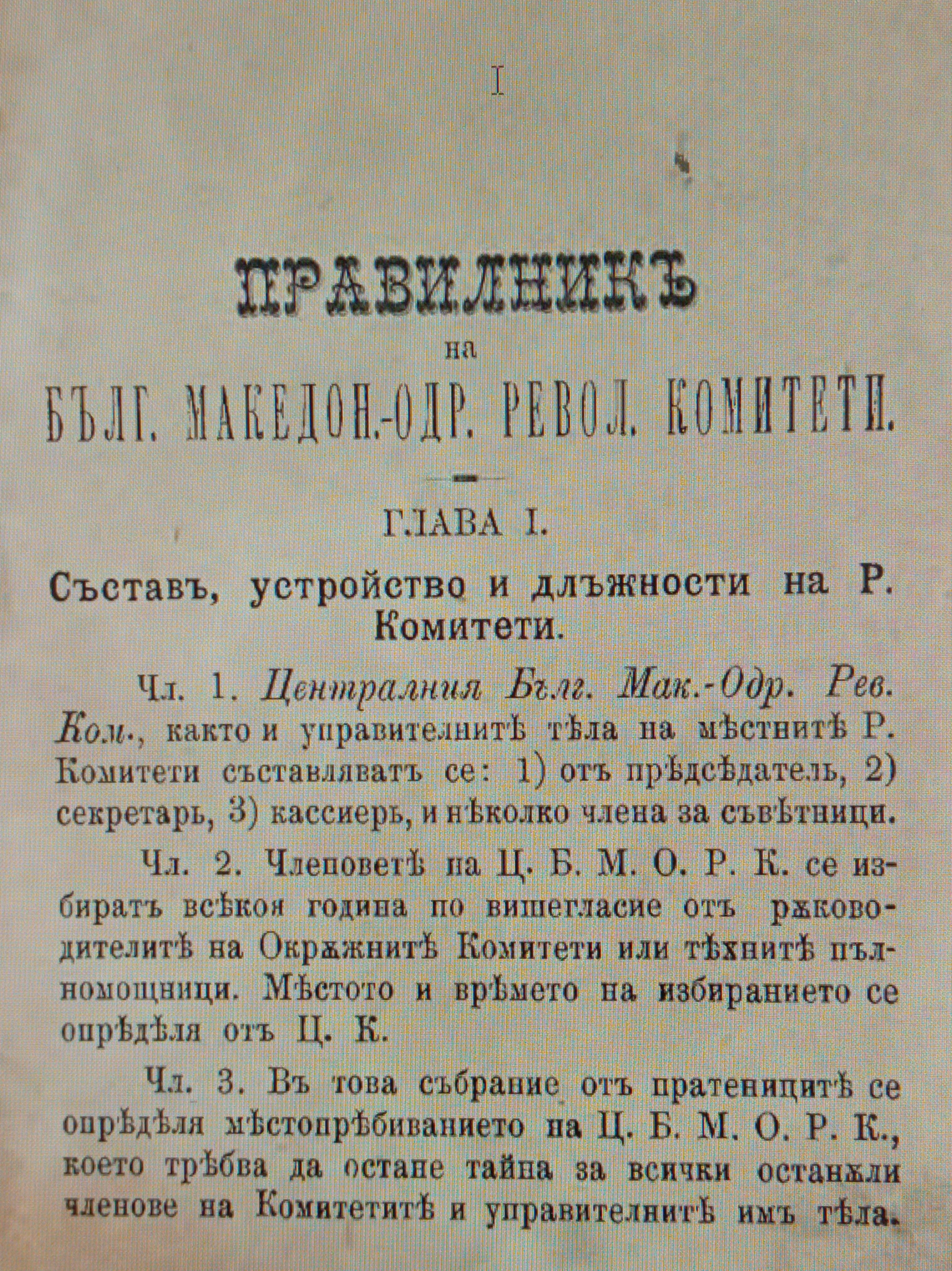
Excerpt from the regulations of BMARC, (1894 or 1896) in Bulgarian language.

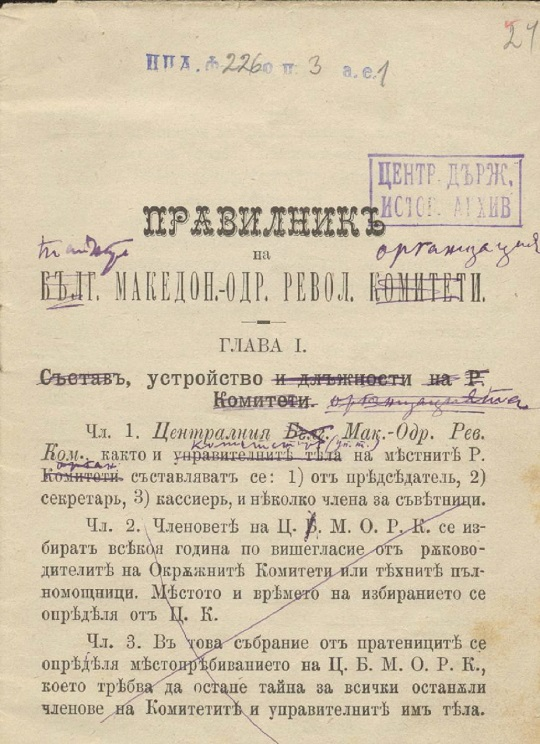
Excerpt of the draft of the regulations of the SMARO made by hand on the regulations of the BMARC by Gotse Delchev or Petar Poparsov. According to Katardziev, out of 50 articles in both regulations, 39 are identical or similar.

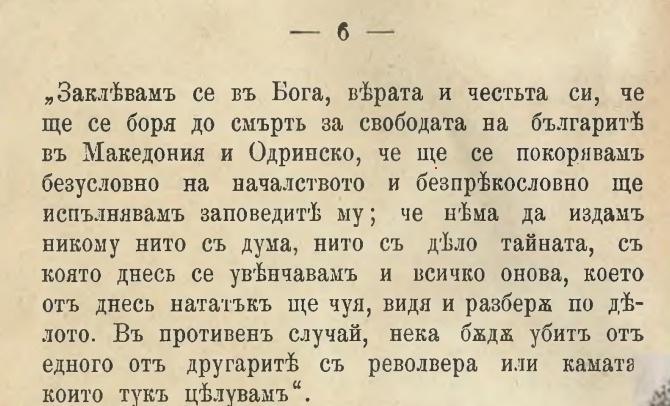
Excerpt from Art. 15 of the RegulatIons of the BMARC containing the oath of the Organization: "I swear by God, my faith and honor that I will fight to the death for the freedom of the Bulgarians in Macedonia and the Adrianople region, that I will submit unconditionally to the leadership and will unprotestingly carry out its orders; that I will betray to no one, neither by word nor by deed the secret to which I wed myself today and all that I shall see, hear and understand concerning the Cause from today on. If I break my oath, let me be killed by one of the comrades with the revolver or the dagger which here I kiss."

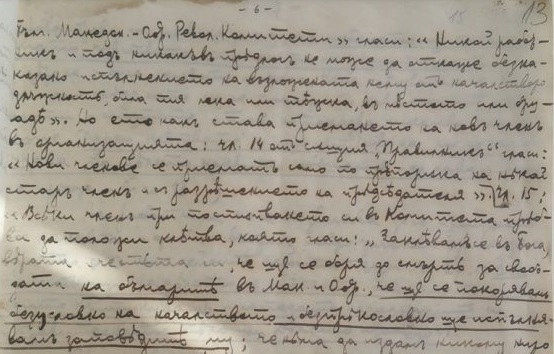
Excerpt from page 6 of Spiro Gulabchev's manuscript from 1904 "The causes that gave rise to the revolutionary organization remain unexplored; (Part II "The Organization"). The text discusses the statute and regulations of BMARC. In the excerpt, Art. 19, Art. 14 and Art. 15 of the Regulations are quoted verbatim. Art. 15 describes the oath of the Organization.

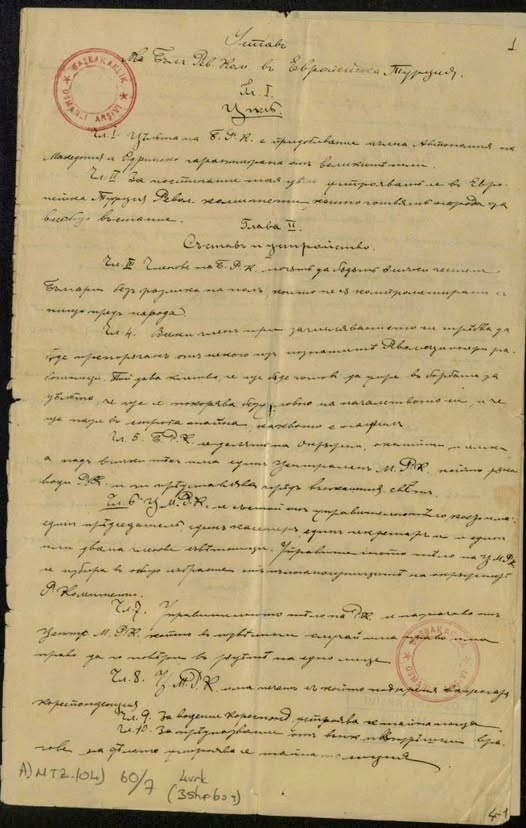
In 2026, unknown handwritten statute and regulations of the "Bulgarian Revolutionary Committee in European Turkey", captured by the Ottoman authorities in 1898, were discovered in the Ottoman archives. They are still unresearched. According to Art. 5 of the statute: "The Bulgarian Revolutionary Committee (BRC) is divided into district, sub-district and regional (committees), and above all of them there is a Central Macedonian Revolutionary Committee (CMRC).

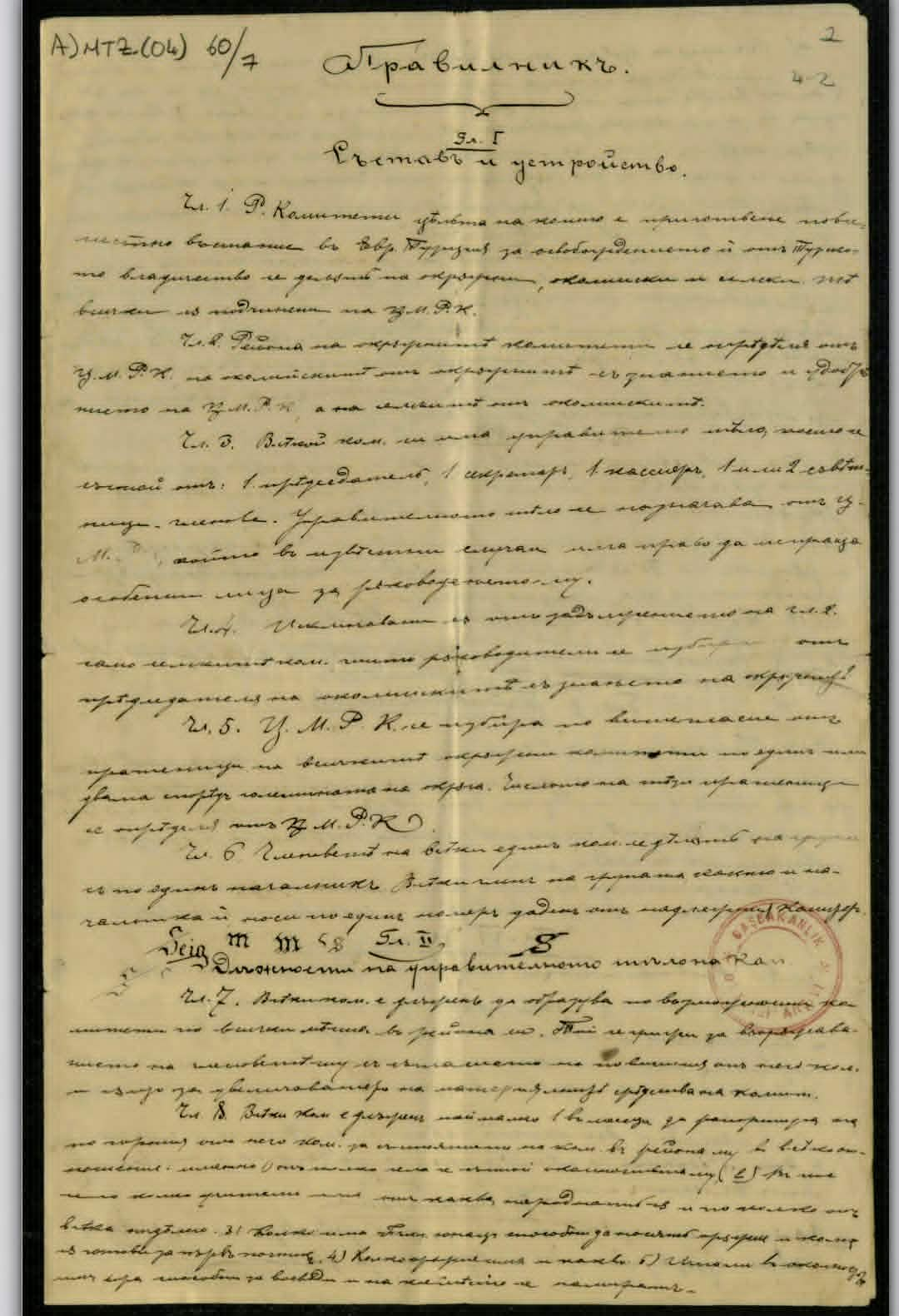
The first page of the Rules of the "Bulgarian Revolutionary Committee in European Turkey". According to Article 1 of the Regulations, all revolutionary committees in European Turkey are subordinate to the Central Macedonian Revolutionary Committee.

A donation appeal from 1890s issued in Thessaloniki and addressed to the Bulgarians. It is stamped on a CMRC-branded form. The form features the picture from the covers of the BMARC statutes and regulations.

In the earliest dated samples of statutes and regulations of the clandestine Internal Macedonian Revolutionary Organization (IMRO) discovered, it is called Bulgarian Macedonian-Adrianopolitan Revolutionary Committees (BMARC). (Note: Bulgarian: Български македоно-одрински революционни комитети (БМОРК), Macedonian: Бугарски македонско-одрински револуционерни комитети (БМОРК)) These documents refer to the then Bulgarian population in the Ottoman Empire, which was to be prepared for a general uprising in Macedonia and Adrianople regions, aiming to achieve political autonomy for them. In thе statute of BMARC, the membership was reserved exclusively for Bulgarians. This ethnic restriction matches with the memoirs of some founding and ordinary members, where such a requirement is mentioned. (Note: This formulation was understood then primarily as referring to the Bulgarian Exarchists, who in those conditions were synonymous with the name "Bulgarians". Apart from them, the Bulgarian Uniates from the Kukush region and the Bulgarian Protestants from the Razlog region were among the first to be drawn into the IMRO. Both, the former and the latter were distinguished by their Bulgarian national self-awareness. For more see: Дмитрий Олегович Лабаури (2008) Болгарское национальное движение в Македонии и Фракии в 1894-1908 гг. Идеология, программа, практика политическои борьбы. БАН, ISBN 9789543223176, стр. 137.) In fact, the founders of IMRO were sympathetic to Bulgarian, but hostile to Serbian nationalism, which led some of them to establish a Society against Serbs in 1897. Per George C. Papavizas, the organization's Bulgarian ethnic character is confirmed by the lack of any mention of Macedonian ethnicity. The name of BMARC, as well as information about its statute, was mentioned in the foreign press of that time, in Bulgarian diplomatic correspondence, and exists in the memories of some revolutionaries and contemporaries.

Due to the lack of original protocol documentation, and the fact its early organic statutes were not dated, the first statute of the Organisation is uncertain and is a subject to dispute among researchers. The dispute also includes its first name and ethnic character, as well as the authenticity, dating, validity, and authorship of its supposed first statute. The Organization was founded in Ottoman Thessaloniki at the end of 1893, and its founders - four teachers, a physician and a bookseller, considered themselves as part of the Bulgarian national movement. Certain contradictions and even mutually exclusive statements, along with inconsistencies exist in the testimonies of the founding and other early members of the Organization, which further complicates the solution of the problem. It is not yet clear whether the earliest statutory documents of the Organization have been discovered. According to historian Ivan Katardžiev in 1965, its earliest basic documents were not known to the historical community until then.

The revolutionary organization changed its name several times before adopting in 1919 in Sofia, Bulgaria, its last and most common name i.e. Internal Macedonian Revolutionary Organization. The repeated changes of name of the IMRO has led to an ongoing debate between Bulgarian and Macedonian historians, as well as within the Macedonian historiographical community. The crucial question is to which degree the Organization had a Bulgarian ethnic character and when it tried to open itself to the other Balkan nationalities. As a whole, its founders were inspired by the earlier Bulgarian revolutionary traditions. Such activists believed that Slavic Macedonian society was reproducing the Bulgarian National Revival with a time lag. The situation was similar in Adrianople Thrace. All its basic documents were written in the pre-1945 Bulgarian orthography. The first statute of the IMRO was modelled after the statute of the earlier Bulgarian Revolutionary Central Committee (BRCC). IMRO adopted from BRCC also its symbol: the lion, and its motto: Svoboda ili smart. All its six founders were closely related to the Bulgarian Men's High School of Thessaloniki. They were native to the region of Macedonia, and some members (such as Gotse Delchev) were influenced by anarcho-socialist ideas, which gave the movement a slightly leftist leaning.

The first statute was drawn up in the winter of 1894. In the summer of the same year, the first congress of the organization took place in Resen. At this meeting, Hristo Tatarchev was elected as its first head. The draft of the first statute was approved there, while the drafting of its first regulations was commissioned. The occasion for convening this meeting was the celebration on the consecration of the newly built Bulgarian Exarchate church in the town in August 1894. It was decided at the meeting to preferably recruit teachers from the Bulgarian schools as committee members. Of the sixteen members who attended the group's first congress, fourteen were Bulgarian schoolteachers. Schoolteachers were en masse involved in the committee's activity, and the Ottoman authorities considered the Bulgarian schools as "nests of bandits". On the eve of the 20th century, IMRO was often called by the Ottoman authorities as "the Bulgarian Committee", hence the Ottomans considered it to be Bulgarian in its national orientation, while its members were designated as Comitadjis, i.e. "committee men".

== Drafting of first statute and statements of members ==
Different statements exist in the testimonies of the founders on the Organization's character, goals, name, the time and the way its early documents were adopted. According to Gyorche Petrov, initially the IMRO was not called an "Organization", and this term was introduced later. Per a founder, Petar Poparsov, its first name was "Committee for acquiring the political rights of Macedonia, given to it by the Treaty of Berlin". IMRO was often called by the Ottoman authorities and Henry Brailsford "the Bulgarian Committee".

According to the founding member Hristo Tatarchev's memoirs, there were two created structures with the first statute from 1894: an organization and its central committee. He mentioned their names as "Macedonian Revolutionary Organization" (MRO) and a "Central Macedonian Revolutionary Committee" (CMRC) and clarified that the word "Bulgarian" was subsequently dropped from their names. Tatarchev noted that he did not remember the first name very clearly. Per Tatarchev, the founders of the IMRO had Zahari Stoyanov's memoir about the April Uprising of 1876, in which the statute of the Bulgarian Revolutionary Central Committee (BRCC) was published, which they took as a model for the organization's first statute. Part of the first official documents of the organization were stamped with a round seal with the inscription "Central Macedonian Revolutionary Committee". Some researchers assume that this original seal proves the first name of the Central Committee in Thessaloniki, which was at the head of the local Macedonian Revolutionary Committees (MRC). The earliest surviving document regarding the activities of the Organization is a letter to the Supreme Macedonian Adrianople Committee dated January 20, 1896, bearing the reference number 115. The letter is written on letterhead featuring the abbreviation "CMRC" and bears an organizational seal with the inscription: "Macedonian Central Revolutionary Committee." The SMAC's reply from Sofia is dated March 22, 1896, and bears reference number 60. It is addressed to the Chairman of the Central Revolutionary Macedonian Committee. According to Tatarchev, the Adrianople region was included in the organization's program in 1895, while this decision was implemented practically in 1896. Per Hristo Kotsev (1869-1933) Dame Gruev commissioned him to start the construction of the committee network in Adrianople region in 1895. In September 1895, the first revolutionary committee was founded in Bulgarian Men's High School of Adrianople.

According to Poparsov, the first statute's swatch was sent to be printed in Romania, where it burned down in a fire and its publication failed. Early statute and regulations were adopted in 1896, printed in Sofia in 1897, by Gyorche Petrov and Gotse Delchev. Per the IMRO activist Lazar Gyurov (1872-1931), the first statute and regulations were printed in a very limited quantity in Thessaloniki after 1894. According to Gyurov, he had hidden one copy each of the statutes and regulations, but he did not manage to keep them because they fell apart due to poor storage conditions. It is known that the first statute was prepared by Petar Poparsov and was adopted at the beginning of 1894, and according to some reports, the first regulations were developed by Ivan Hadzhinikolov either in the same year or in 1895. The data presented by Gyurov has raised the question of whether the foundational documents of the Organization were really printed in Thessaloniki for the first time. It is known also that another early statute and regulations adopted in 1896, were printed in Sofia in 1897, by Gyorche Petrov and Gotse Delchev.

The first statute allowed the membership only for Bulgarians and this is confirmed by Tatarchev in his memoirs from 1936 as follows: "it was allowed that every Bulgarian, from any region, could be a member", as well as in the memoirs of other revolutionaries. According to Hristo Matov, although the first statute allowed the membership only to Bulgarians Exarchists, in practice the leaders of the Organization did not prohibit the membership of Patriarchists, Uniates and Protestants of all local nationalities, According to Ivan Hadzhinikolov, membership was open to everyone from Macedonia. According to Tatarchev's recollections, the decision about the change of the statute, so that not only Bulgarians could be members of the organization, was taken in 1896. Per the Supreme Macedonian-Adrianople Committee activist Vladislav Kovachev the first statute of the IMRO allowed the membership only for Bulgarians within a special article. According to the revolutionary Nikola Altaparmakov, a revolutionary committee was founded in Thessaloniki in 1893, and per its first statute, any Bulgarian could be its member.

Per Iliya Doktorov, the organization initially had a nationalist character and only Bulgarians had the right to be members of it, but this ethnic restriction lasted until 1896. According to Georgi Bazhdarov, who also confirmed the statute of BMARC as the first one, the Organization was opened to other nationalities besides Bulgarians after 1900. Per the memoirs of Alekso Martulkov, the original statute of the organization allowed only Bulgarians as members. This situation was changed in a new statute in 1896. According to the revolutionary Hristo Karamandzhukov, the statute of BMARC continued to be used even after 1902. Per Bulgarian anarchist Spiro Gulabchev, in the mid-1890s, arose the "Bulgarian Macedonian Adrianopolitan Revolutionary Committee", which, according to its statute and regulations, was a Bulgarian nationalist organization. According to Dimitar Popevtimov (1890-1961), the organization was initially called the BMARC, and only Bulgarians were accepted as its members, per its first statute from 1894. According to revolutionary Nikola Zografov, in 1895 Gotse Delchev was supplied with a power of attorney from the name of the BMARC and sent to Sofia to propagate the struggle for autonomy that was open to every Bulgarian. Per Hristo Silyanov in the minds of the founders of the organization, it was Bulgarian in its ethnic composition, and its member, according to the first statue, could be "any Bulgarian". Krste Misirkov stated in his brochure On the Macedonian Matters (1903) that the "Bulgarian committees" were led by "Bulgarian clerks", aiming for the creation of a "Bulgarian Macedonia". According to Gyorche Petrov, before the drafting of the second statute and regulations in 1896, there were available others, which were still in use, that suggests there were earlier statutes and regulations after all. Dimitar Vlahov maintained that initially, the organization worked only among Bulgarians who belonged to the Bulgarian Exarchate. Later, when the leaders of the organization saw that the idea of the liberation of Macedonia could find supporters among the Bulgarian non-Еxarchists, as well as among other nationalities, and under the influence of some leftist views, they amended the organization's statutes to the effect that any Macedonian could be a member, regardless of nationality, as long as he accepted its principles.

== Bulgarian Macedonian–Adrianopolitan Revolutionary Committees ==
=== Discovery of the statute of BMARC ===
According to Macedonian historian Ivan Katardžiev in 1965, only the statute from 1897 (SMARO) was known in the historical literature, while the 1894 (BMARC) and 1902 statutes were unknown. In 1955, the historian Ivan Ormandzhiev published in Sofia the undated statute of the SMARO, which he dated from 1896. The fact that only 15 copies of this statute were printed in Sofia in 1897, reveals how sparse such documents were.

In 1961, Katardžiev published undated statute and regulations discovered by him, naming the organization BMARC, which he dated from 1894. The discovered documents are kept since then at the Institute of National History in Skopje. Originals of the statute and the regulations of BMARC were also found in 1967 in Bulgaria. According to the statute of the BMARC, membership of the Organization was allowed only for Bulgarians. Per Katardžiev, BMARC was the first official name of the IMRO and it was never officially named "Macedonian Revolutionary Organization" (MRO). Some international, Bulgarian and Macedonian researchers have adopted his view that this was the first statute, i.e. the first official name of the organization.

=== Macedonian views ===
==== BMARC ====
According to Katardžiev, BMARC's statute was the first statute of the organization and under this name, it existed from 1894 until 1896 when it was changed to Secret Macedono-Adrianopolitan Revolutionary Organization (SMARO). In 1969, the name BMARC as the first one, was officially promoted as the position of the Macedonian historical community in the second volume of the first ever three-volume History of the Macedonian people, as well as in its one-volume edition, in 1970. Per Gane Todorovski, from its very name it could be concluded this was initially an organization primarily of the Bulgarian population in Macedonia and Adrianople. Per historian Krste Bitovski, this was not only the first preserved statute but the original statute of IMRO. According to Manol Pandevski, the basic program document of the Organization was published in 1894 under the name "Statute of the Bulgarian Macedonian-Adrianopolitan Revolutionary Committees", and so it even was not called an organization. Katardžiev confirmed there was an overlapping of the texts of the statutes and regulations of BMARC and these of SMARO, and it was clear that when drafting these of SMARO, those of BMARC were used. Later that conclusion was confirmed, while corrected statute and rules of the BMARC were discovered in Bulgaria, which are practically drafts of the basic documents of the SMARO.

==== Revisionist turn ====
In 1981, the Macedonian historiography for the first time publicly dissociated itself from the thesis advocated by Katardžiev for the name BMARC in the first volume of the two-volume publication Documents for the struggle of the Macedonian people for independence and for a national state. According to Blaže Ristovski in his book History of the Macedonian nation in 1999, the first name of the Organization was MRO. Most Macedonian historians reject the authenticity of the designation BMARC, which was not mentioned in the memoirs of the organization's founders.

In the historiography, the issues about the original name and the first statute of the organization are still not resolved. The historian Dimitar Dimeski wrote that even without mentioning the name "BMARC", per its first statute, the organization had a nationalist character. It was the result of intolerance, external influence and lack of experience. Historian Andrew Rossos wrote that the organization was named Bulgarian-Macedonian-Adrianople Revolutionary Organization until 1902.

In 1997, historian Vančo Gjorgjiev dated the statute of BMARC from 1894. In 2010, Gjorgjiev claimed that the organization's name was "Macedonian Revolutionary Organization" led by the "Central Macedonian Revolutionary Committee" in 1894. Gjorgjiev also published the statutes and the regulations of BMARC translated from Bulgarian into Macedonian language in 2013. In 2021, he claimed that not a single document written from any activist of the Organization has been found so far, containing the name of BMARC.

=== Bulgarian views ===
==== IMRO as Bulgarian organization ====
Bulgarian historians see the statute and the regulations of BMARC as a confirmation of the Bulgarian ethnic character of the organization. The aim of the Committees per Article 2 of their statute was to raise the consciousness for self-defense among the Bulgarian population in both regions in order that there be one single uprising in them. Apart from the fact the statute allowed the membership only to Bulgarians, the regulations contain an oath which also confirms its Bulgarian character. Per historian Tchavdar Marinov, the primary issue for Bulgarian and Macedonian historians in this case is to know when the organization had abandoned its "narrowly Bulgarian" character. Per him, during the Ottoman period, the IMRO was active also in Thrace and this fact is difficult to explain from the Macedonian historiography. It suggests that Macedonian revolutionaries then did not differentiate themselves from Bulgarians on an ethnic base. Also, they wrote in standard Bulgarian rather than in some Macedonian dialect.

==== MRO ====
In 1969, the Bulgarian historian Konstantin Pandev promoted the view that the designation BMARC lasted from 1896 until 1902, when it was changed to SMARO, a view adopted by some international and Bulgarian historians. Until then, Bulgarian historians shared Katardžiev's opinion that the designation BMARC was used between 1894 and 1896. Some Bulgarian researchers assume the first unofficial name of the organization during 1894-1896 was Macedonian Revolutionary Organization or Macedonian Revolutionary Committee. The name "MRO" is present in modern sources. Neither statutes nor regulations, or other basic documents with the name "MRO" have been found. Other Bulgarian historians suppose that the founding documents of the IMRO still have not been discovered and that the name of BMARC is from 1896/1897. The first preserved statute of the organization is that of the BMARC. Other Bulgarian historians also do not accept the view of Pandev and continue to adhere to that of Katardžiev, i.e., the first statutory name of the organization from 1894 was BMARC. Bulgarian researchers also maintain that Katardžiev himself had some manifestations when he publicly claimed the IMRO revolutionaries had Bulgarian self-awareness.

=== Authorship dispute ===
According to some Bulgarian and Macedonian researchers, the author of BMARC's statute was Poparsov. Other Bulgarian historians assume that the authors of the statute were Gotse Delchev and Gyorche Petrov. Per Peyo Yavorov, Delchev participated in a congress of the Organization, which adopted a statute, almost a copy of the old Bulgarian revolutionary statute. It contained a special article according to which only Bulgarians were accepted as its members. According to Yavorov, Delchev voted in support of this article in question, which he believed was chauvinistic. Later, when the circumstances changed, Delchev was the first to insist that this article be amended, and this is what happened. Per Ivan Hadzhinikolov's memoirs, Poparsov was assigned to draw up the first statute. In his memoirs, Gruev recounted that the founders grouped together and jointly drew up a statute modeled after the statute of the revolutionary organization in Bulgaria before the Liberation. According to Petrov, initially a short statute drafted by Gruev was in force. It was decided to draw up a new complete statute and regulations. Petrov did it in Sofia, together with Delchev.

=== Periodization dispute ===
On October 10, 1900, the newspaper "Pester Lloyd", published in retelling form excerpts from the captured by the Ottoman authorities statutes of the Bulgarian Macedonian Revolutionary Committee, i.e. BMARC. On October 13, the Greek newspaper "Imera" published the same material.

The Austro-Hungarian consul in Skopje Gottlieb Para (1861-1915), in his report from November 14, 1902, attached a document in translation, which he designated as the new statute of the revolutionary organization. This document bears the title: "Statute of the Secret Macedonian-Adrianople Revolutionary Organization". It is identical to the document issued in 1902, according to Pandev, as well as with the statute, which according to Katardžiev was compiled in 1897. At the same time the Serbian Consul General in Bitola Mihajlo Ristić wrote on January 25, 1903, that until the beginning of 1902, the work of the Committee had a purely Bulgarian character, while the local Serbs and Greeks feared its activity. At the end of 1902, however the Committee's members began to turn to all Christians for cooperation, regardless of their nationality. Based on the early 2000s discovery, that the cover of the BMARC rules were dated 1896, the problem when the BMARC regulations were printed, is regarded as solved by the Bulgarian historian Tsocho Bilyarski. Hadzhinikolov points out that he prepared it in 1895. According to Tatarchev, in 1894 the need to develop an internal rulebook arose and this was done by Hadzhinikolov at the end of the same year.

According to the memoirs of Dimitar Voynikov, when Delchev visited Strandzha Mountain in 1900, the changes in the statute of SMARO were already factual and were discussed at a meetings with the local IMRO activists, where his father was present. Also, Macedonian historians point to the fact that a copy of the "SMARO" statute was kept in London since 1898. In 1905, the organization changed its name to Internal Macedonian-Adrianople Revolutionary Organization (IMARO).

== Legacy ==
In 2015, a civil association "BMARC Ilinden-Preobrazhenie" was registered in Bulgaria. Among its founders were scientists, historians, journalists and descendants of Bulgarian historical figures from the regions of Macedonia and Southern Thrace. In 2016, a monument to the fallen revolutionaries from Macedonia and Thrace was uncovered in Sofia. On the left side of the monument, the abbreviation BMARC (БМОРК) is written.

In 2018, in relation with the campaign for the change of the constitutional name of the then Republic of Macedonia, the Bulgarian Cultural Club in Skopje suggested the idea to include the name of BMARC in the preamble of the Macedonian constitution. In 2023, VMRO-NP stated that it is acceptable to revise the preamble of the constitution based on the statute of the historical IMRO, while also accepting the inclusion of Bulgarians in North Macedonia in the constitution based on the fact that IMRO did not mind having Bulgarians in its ranks.

Gjorgjiev said that there is no place for Bulgarians in the country's constitution since they were removed from the Organization's alleged first statute once. The Macedonian film director Darko Mitrevski has written that there is no more mythologized term in Macedonian history than the name of IMRO, but behind this historical myth the original designation "BMARC" is actually hidden, with an organization founded by people with Bulgarian consciousness.

== See also ==
- Internal Revolutionary Organization
- Unity Committee
- Bulgarian Secret Central Revolutionary Committee
- Bulgarian People's Macedonian-Adrianople Revolutionary Organization
- Internal Thracian Revolutionary Organisation
- Internal Macedonian Revolutionary Organization (United)
- Bulgarian Action Committees

== Gallery ==
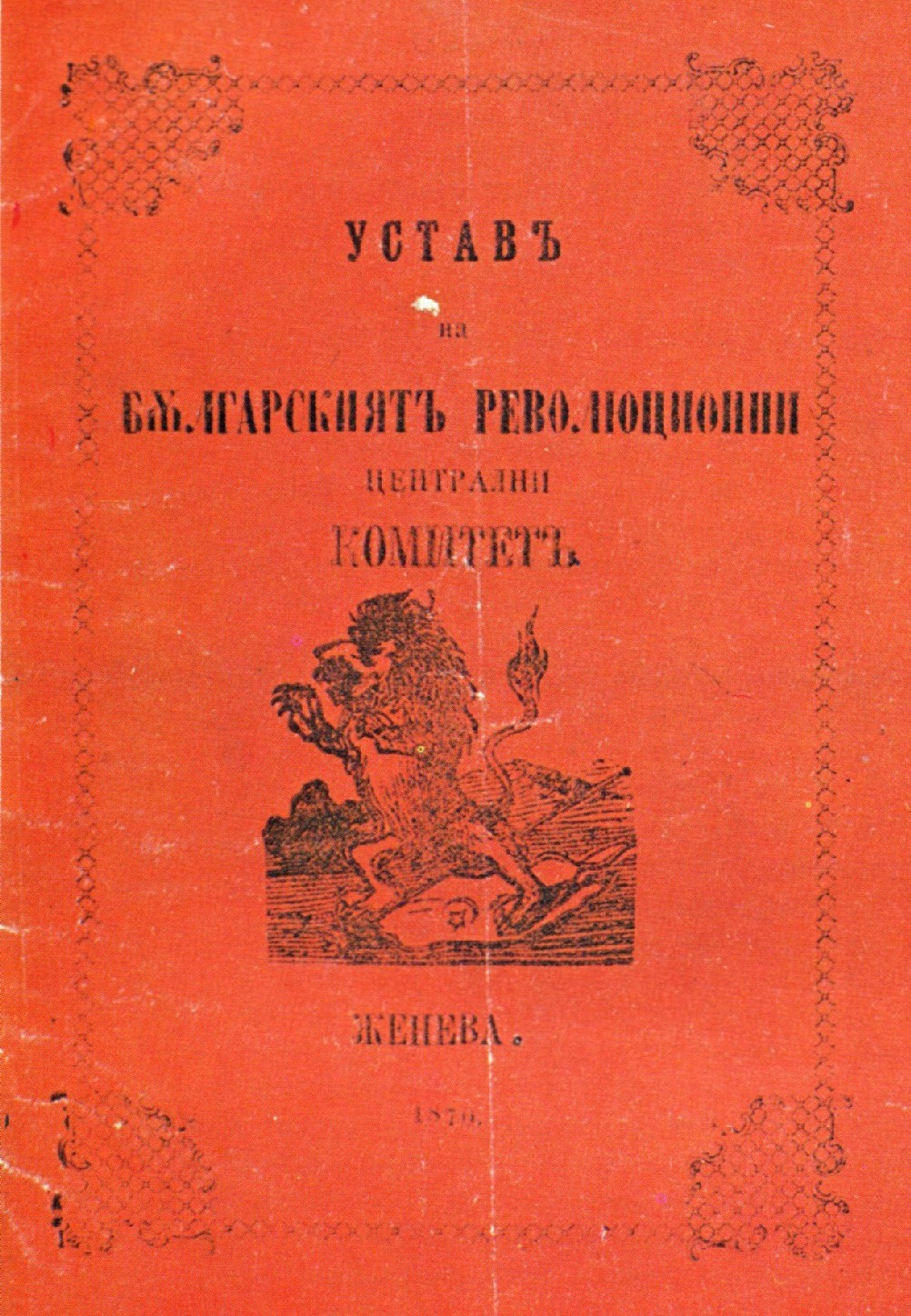
Cover of the statute of the BRCC used as a model for the IMRO's first statute. This statute was drawn up in Bucharest in 1872. Its authors were Vasil Levski and Lyuben Karavelov. In the middle is depicted a lion, standing enraged over a broken Ottoman flag and torn rings of iron chain.

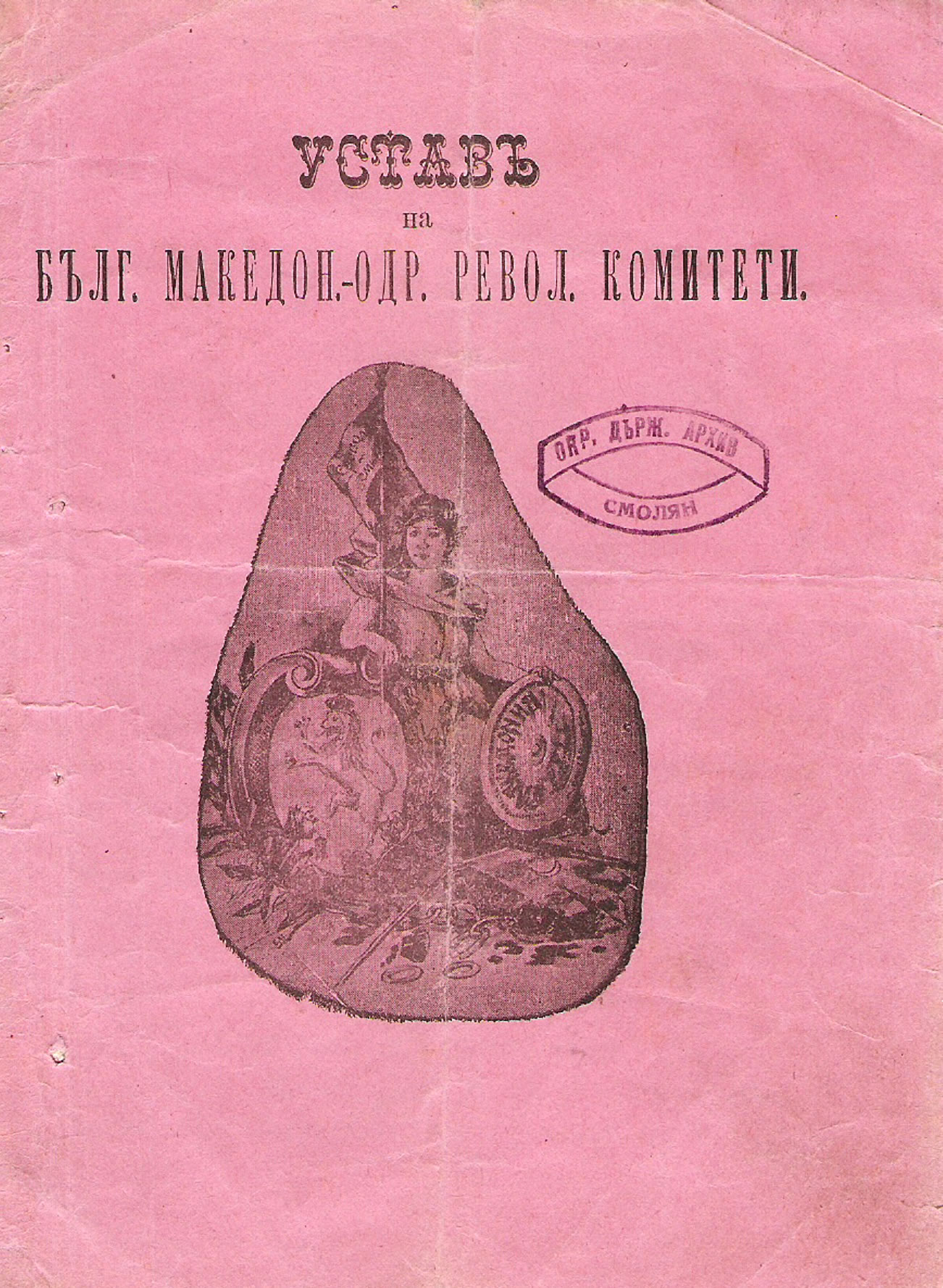
Cover of the statute of the BMARC. Above is an inscription "statute" with the name of the organization below. In the middle is a picture with a seated woman. In her right hand she holds a flag where it is written "Svoboda ili smart". Below is depicted a lion wearing a crown.

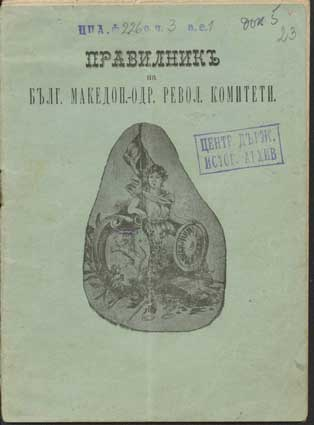
Cover of the Regulations of the BMARC published firstly in Skopje in 1961. According to Hristo Karamandzhukov, they continued to be used even after 1902 in the Smolyan-Xanthi revolutionary subdistrict.

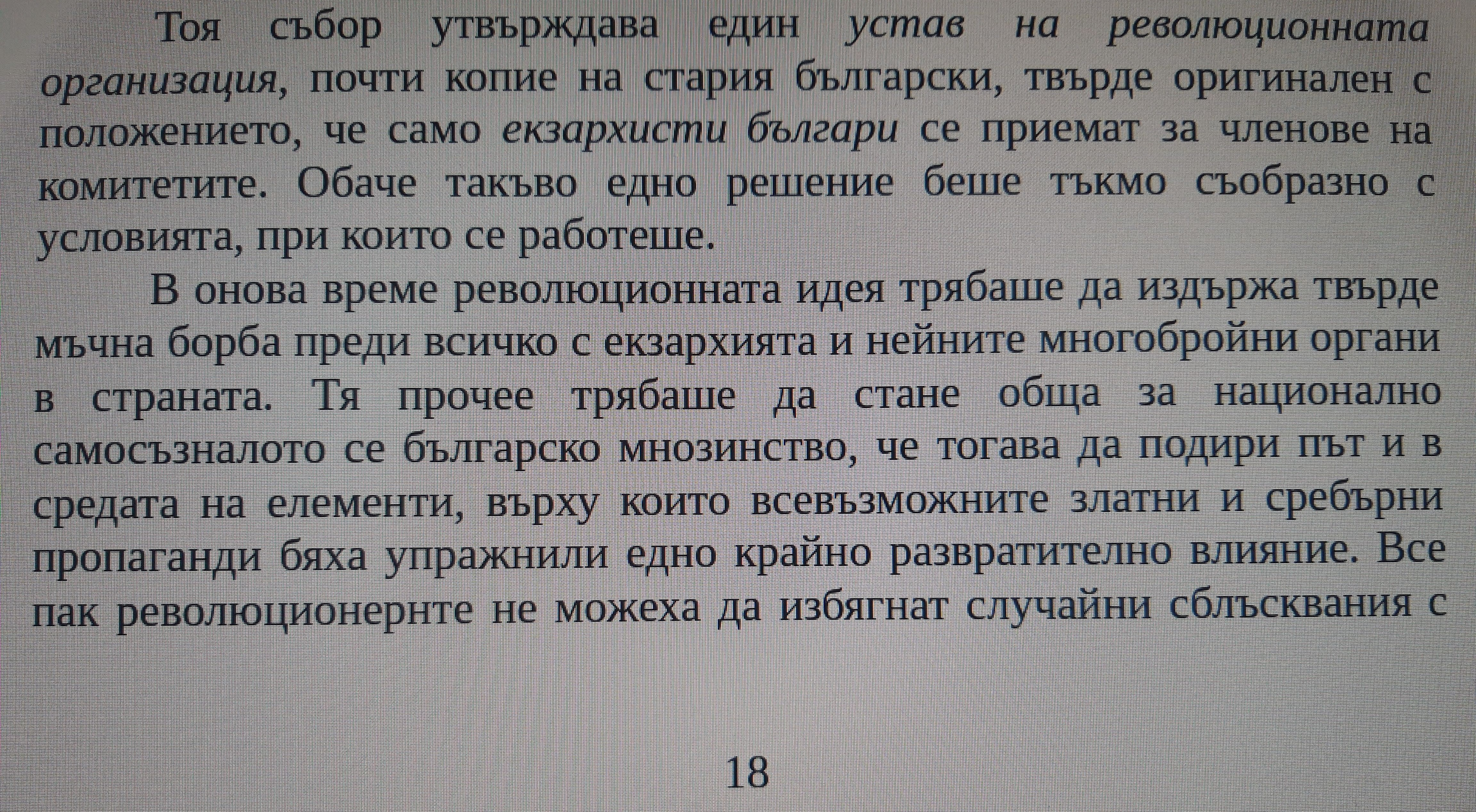
An excerpt from the biography of Gotse Delchev written by Peyo Yavorov in 1904. The author claims that the first statute of the Organization, for whose acceptance Delchev voted, was borrowed from the older Bulgarian revolutionary organisation's statute. According to the new statute, only Bulgarians Exarchists could be members of the "Committees".

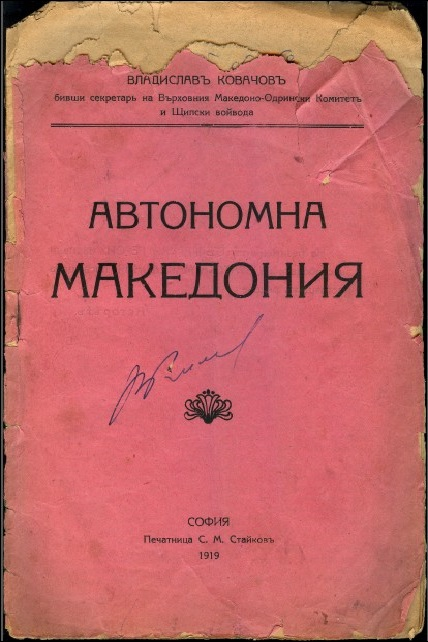
According to the revolutionary Vladislav Kovachev, the first statute allowed the membership only for Bulgarians within a special article (Autonomous Macedonia (1919). Later this status was changed but only a few Vlachs joined the Organization.

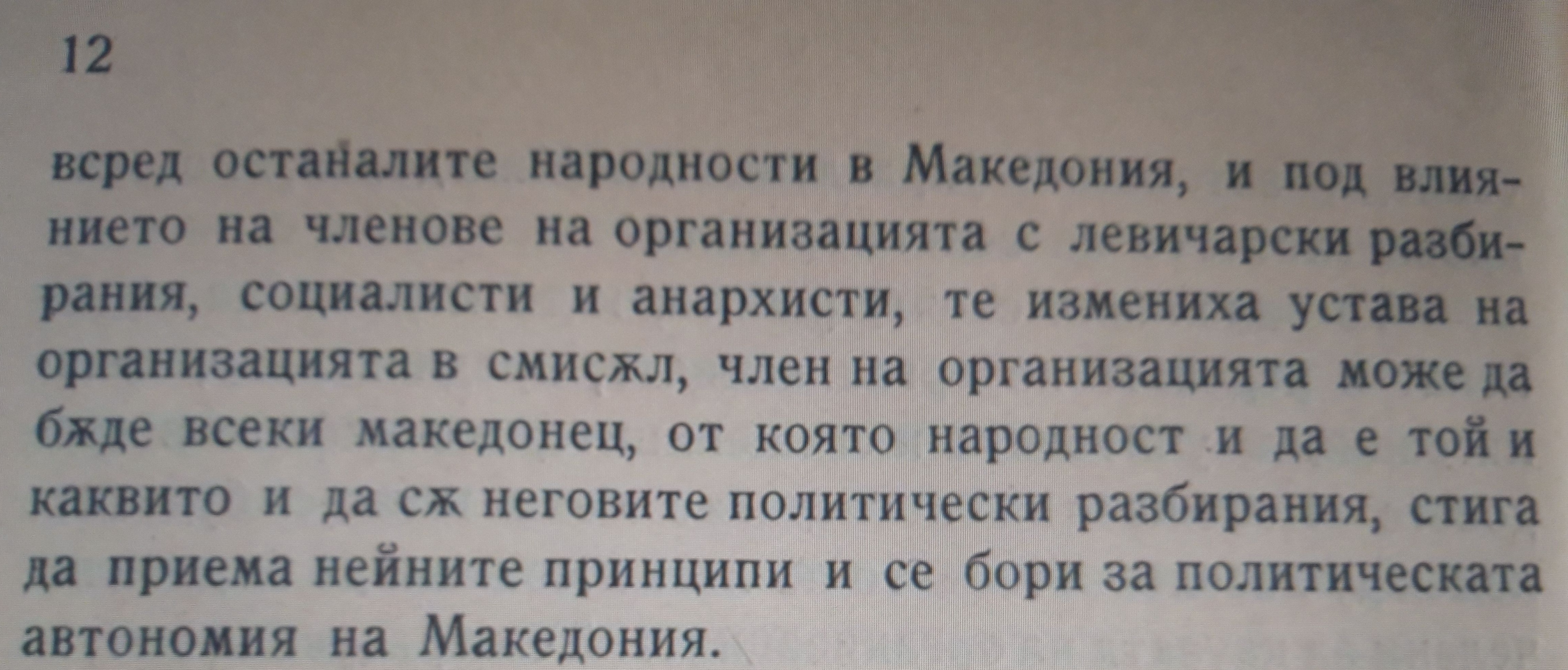
An excerpt from Dimitar Vlahov's book "The Struggles of the Macedonian People for Liberation", published in 1925. He stated that IMRO worked solely among Bulgarians Exarchists, and only after the leaders saw that the idea of the liberation of Macedonia could find supporters among other nationalities and Bulgarians from other denominations, as well under the influence of leftist ideas, they amended the organization's statute that any Macedonian could be its member, regardless of his nationality.

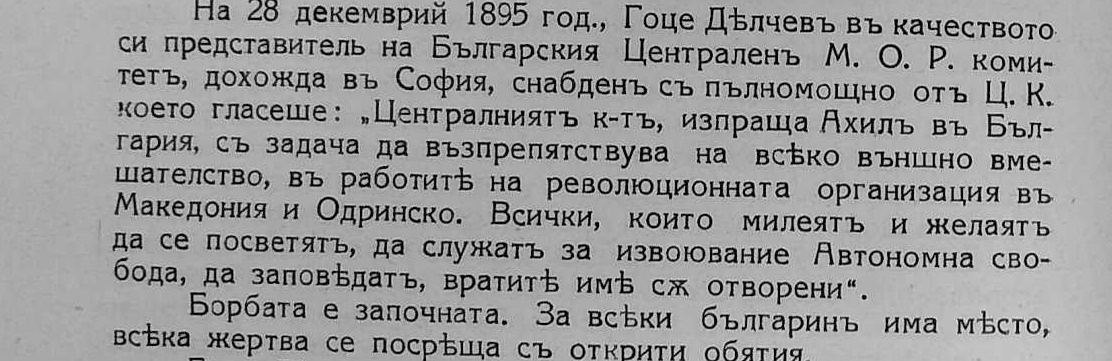
Excerpt from the book "The Construction of Life" (1927), authored by the IMROrevolutionary Nikola Zografov. Per Zografov as early as 1895, Gotse Delchev was supplied with a power of attorney and sent to Sofia, from the name of the "Bulgarian Central Macedonian-Adrianopolitan Revolutionary Committee".

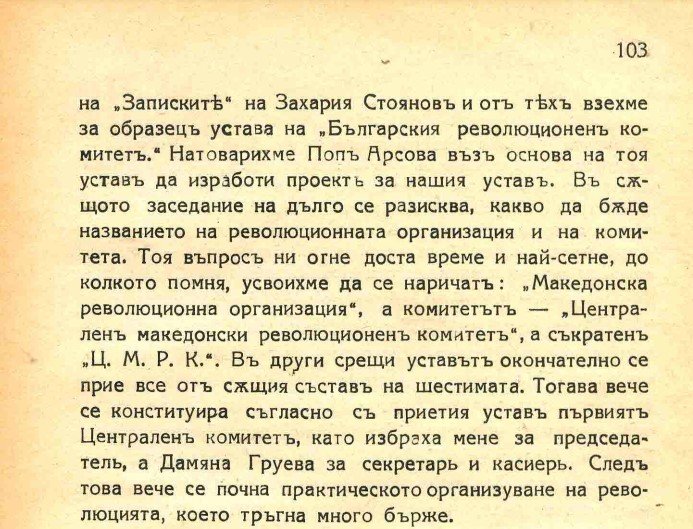
Excerpt from the memoirs of Hristo Tatarchev from 1928, where he described the adoption of the organization's first statute. He wrote that it was modelled after the statute of the earlier BRCC. He also stated that its first name was MRO, but leaving the remark: "as far, as I can remember".

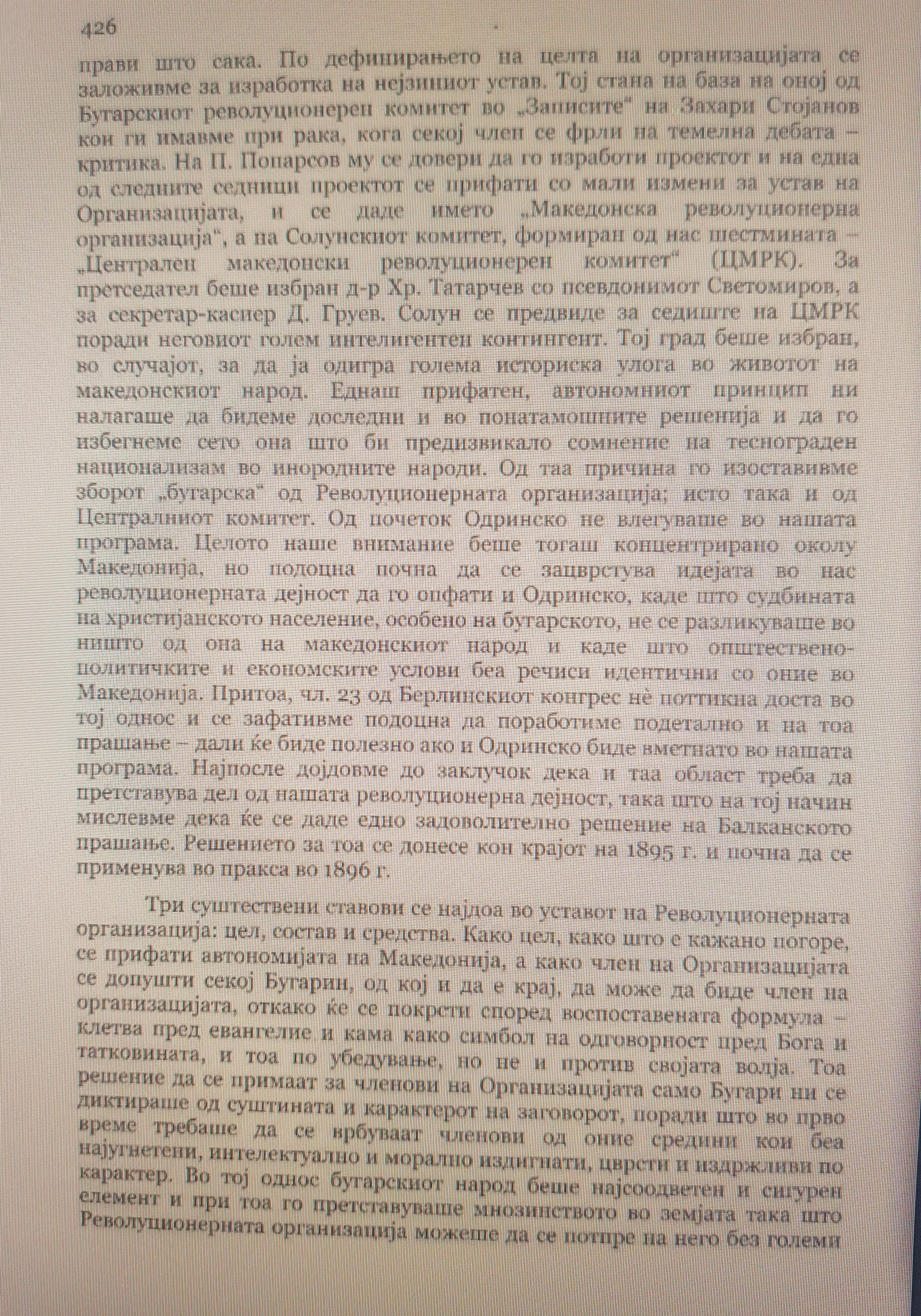
A page from the memoirs of Hristo Tatarchev from 1936, where he described the adoption of the organization's first statute, claiming initially, it was allowed that every Bulgarian, from any region, to be its member. However, per him, the designation "Bulgarian" was dropped from it subsequently, to avoid any nationalist bias among other peoples in the region.

Excerpt from the book "My Participation in the Revolutionary Struggles" from 1954. The author Alekso Martulkov, an activist of the left wing of IMRO wrote that the first statute which was adopted in Resen (1894) was strictly nationalist and contained a special article, which permitted the membership only to Bulgarians. A new statute adopted in Salonica (1896) cancelled this restriction.

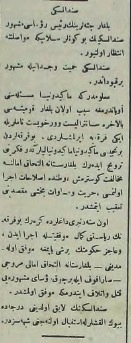
The Ottoman Turkish newspaper Yeni Asır, providing info about one of the voivodas of the Bulgarian chetas Yane Sandanski, who was also a leader of the leftist (centralist) faction of the Bulgarian Committee (1908).

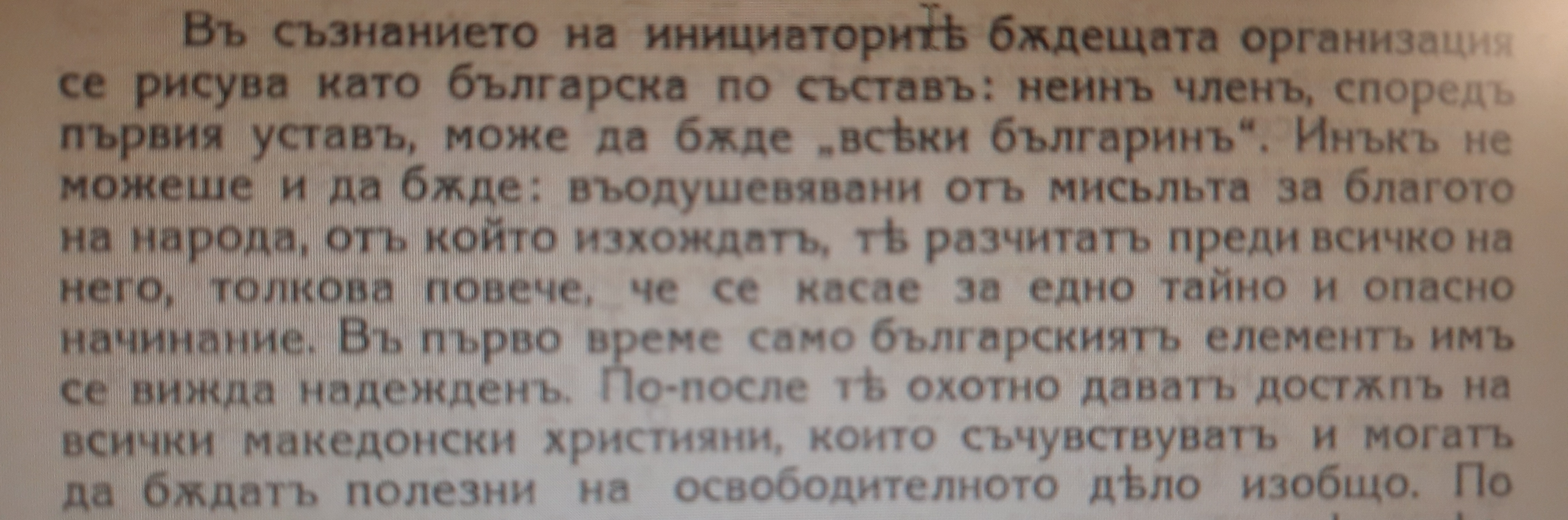
Excerpt from the book by the IMRO revolutionary Hristo Silyanov "The Liberation Struggles of Macedonia", Volume I, (1933). Silyanov states that the founders of the Organization were part of the Bulgarian people and therefore, according to its first statute, its membership was permissible only to Bulgarians.

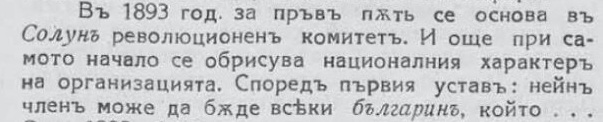
In August 1943, celebrations were held in Bitola, then in Bulgaria, to mark the 40th anniversary of the Ilinden Uprising. The local IMRO voivode Nikola Altaparmakov, testified in his speech that the first statute of the IMRO stipulated its national character, i.e. that only Bulgarians could be its members.

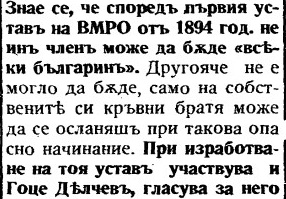
Excerpt from the editorial "The Campaign Against Ilinden in Macedonia", published in the newspaper "Macedonian Tribune" on October 10, 1951. The article states that the first statute of the IMRO adopted in 1894 allowed the membership only to Bulgarians and Gotse Delchev participated in its adoption.

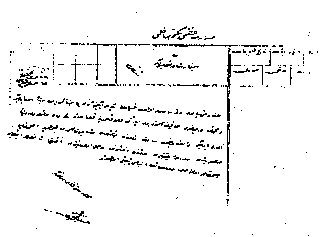
Telegram by the Ottoman authorities to their Embassy in Sofia from 1903, informing that Delchev, one of the leaders of the Bulgarian committees, was killed.

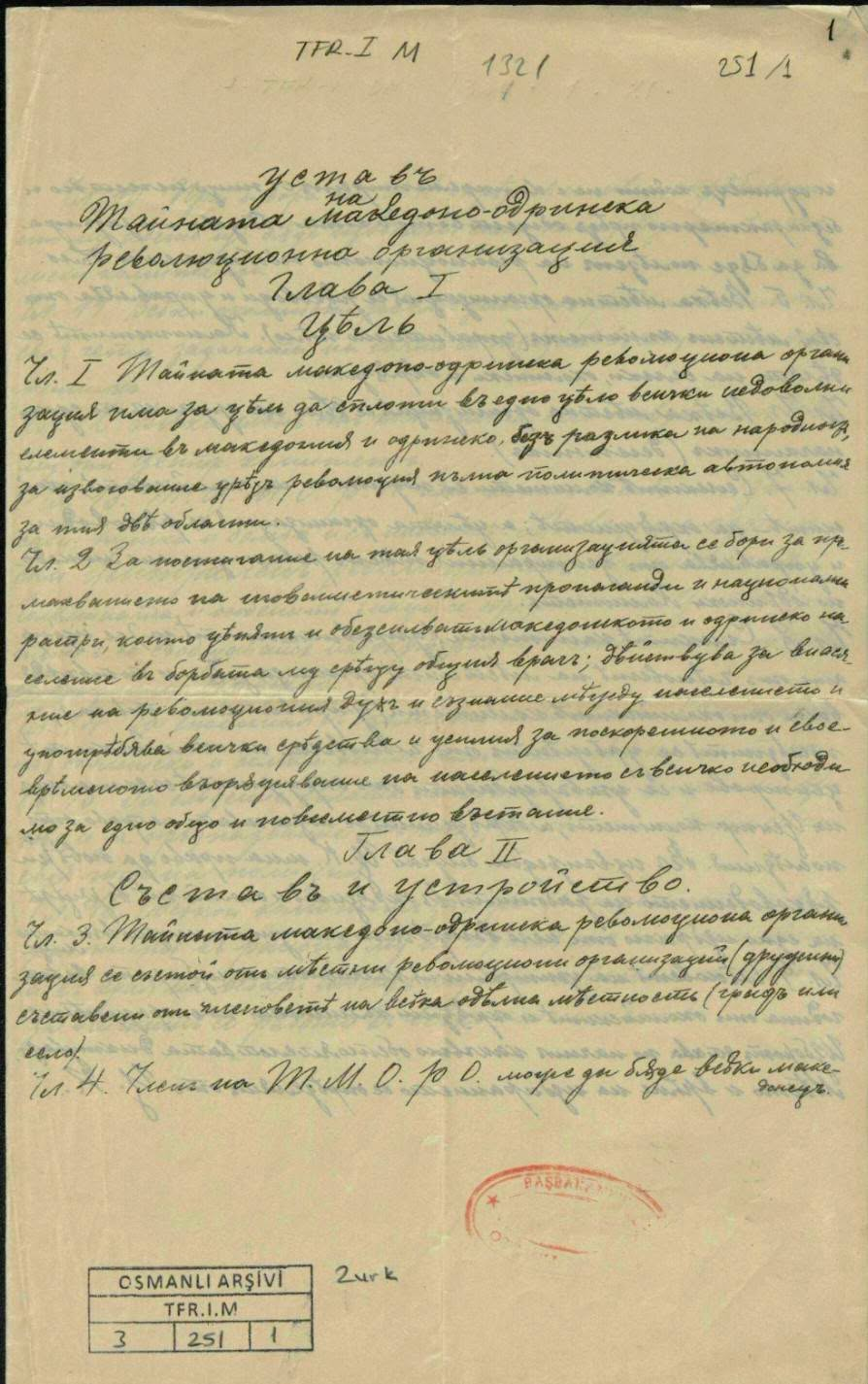
The first page of the Statute of the SMARO from 1896 or 1902. According to Article 4, any Macedonian or native of the Adrianople region may become a member of SMARO, provided they have not been compromised in the eyes of the public by any dishonest or unprincipled conduct, and provided they promise and pledge to be of service to the revolutionary cause of liberation.

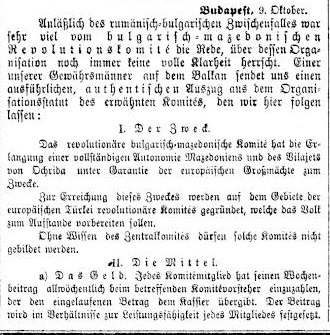
On October 10, 1900, the newspaper "Pester Lloyd", published in retelling form excerpts from the statutes of the BMARC.

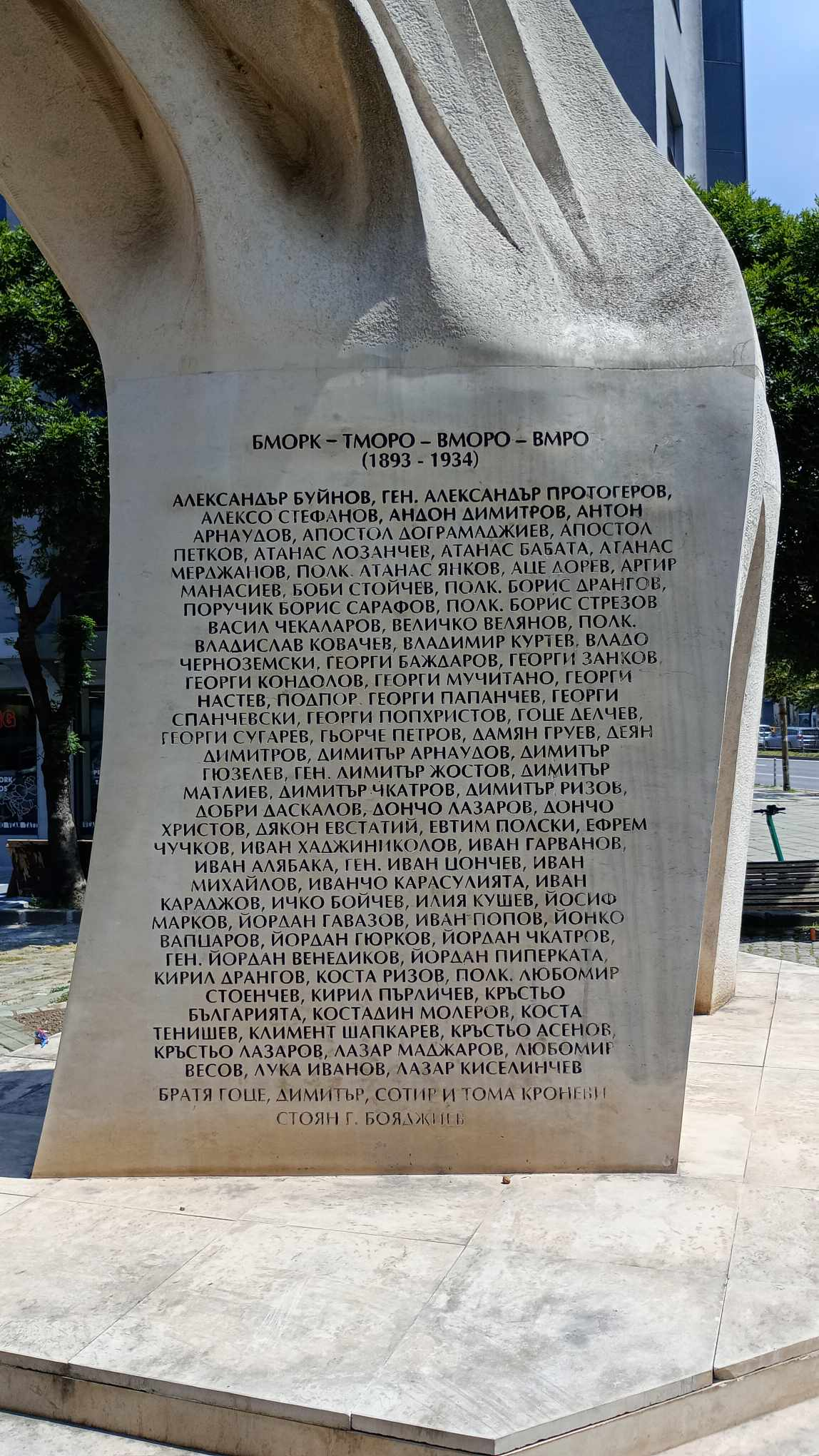
Monument of the fallen for the freedom of Macedonia and Thrace in Sofia. On the first line at the top left is the abbreviation BMARC (БМОРК), denoting the first name of the revolutionary organization.
