= Matov =

Matov (Bulgarian: Матов) is a Bulgarian masculine surname, its feminine counterpart is Matova. It may refer to

- Hristo Matov (1872–1922), Bulgarian revolutionary, philologist, folklorist and publicist
  - Matov Peak in Antarctica named after Hristo Matov
- Nonka Matova (born 1954), Bulgarian rifle shooter
