= Appeal to the Macedonians in Bulgaria =

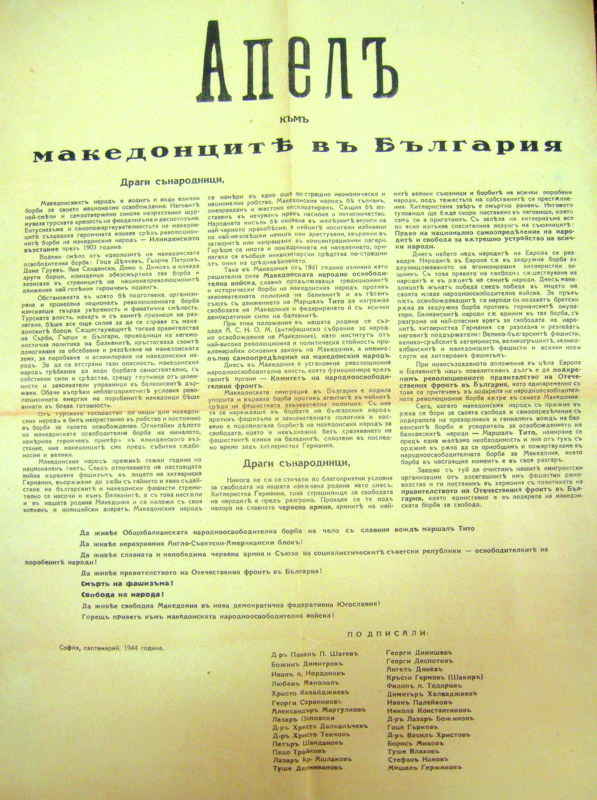
The Appeal to the Macedonians in Bulgaria from September 28, 1944 (in Bulgarian language).

The appeal to the Macedonians in Bulgaria (Bulgarian: Апел до македонците в България) was a political address of 29 left-wing activists, mostly members of the Bulgarian Communist Party, nearly all of whom originated from the Greek or the Yugoslav part of region of Macedonia. They appealed to the members of the then Greek and Yugoslav Macedonian refugees' organizations in Bulgaria. This appeal was made soon after the 1944 Bulgarian Communist coup d'état.

== History ==
=== Background ===
The appeal was published in Sofia, soon after the pro-Soviet coup held on 9 September, 1944 in Bulgaria. On 8 September Bulgaria had switched the side in the war and declared war on Nazi Germany. At that time the Bulgarian troops occupying Eastern Yugoslavia fought their way back to the old borders of the country, while the old Bulgarian territory had been occupied by the Red Army. In this complicated situation, between September 15 and 25, a delegation of Yugoslav communists headed by Svetozar Vukmanović visited Bulgaria in order to push pressure on the new authorities with a number of demands. At that time the Yugoslav communists had hope they would control the new Communist governments in the region. Vukmanović went to Sofia especially to draw up plans for the creation of a future Balkan Communist Federation, encompassing Yugoslavia and Bulgaria. The region of Macedonia was proclaimed to be the connecting link, with a separate Macedonian federal unit within it. Nevertheless, the Bulgarian government was not ready to give up the Bulgarian part of Macedonia, which would seriously damage its fragile prestige then. The delegation held also a meetings with local communists of Macedonian descent and invited them to support the ideas being launched. Simultaneously, Josip Broz Tito used this situation to press the Bulgarian Communists additionally in parallel meetings with Georgi Dimitrov and Stalin, held in Moscow on September 25-27.

=== The Appeal ===
As a result, in the published on September 28 document, the signatories adhered to the view of the existence of a separate Macedonian nation, distinct from Bulgarians. A fight was declared against the pack of chauvinists and warmongers ruling the Balkan states. The document supported the recently created anti-fascist Assembly for the National Liberation of Macedonia, appealing for the foundation of a Socialist Macedonia in the frames of a future Socialist Yugoslavia. The appeal praised the Soviet victories over Nazi Germany, the Allies and the Yugoslavian partisans. Solidarity with the new communist-led Fatherland front government in Bulgaria was also expressed. It was pointed out that the main task of the Macedonian emigration in Bulgaria became to purge all local emigrant organizations of their current Greater Bulgarian leaderships, which were servants of the ousted "Bulgarian fascists". Among the signatories were Pavel Shatev, Mihail Gerdzhikov, Alekso Martulkov, Petar Traykov, etc. Afterwards the new Bulgarian authorities proclaimed the old pro-Bulgarian National Committees of the Macedonian Emigration dissolved and replaced them by a new one, led by some of the communists who signed the appeal. However, BCP leaders reacted very cautiously to the idea to join Bulgarian Macedonia to Yugoslavia, which caused a protest from the Yugoslav side. As whole the appeal's aims would fail, especially after the Tito-Stalin split in 1948, followed by Dimitrov's death, and end of the Greek Civil War in 1949, which was lost by the Communists.

== See also ==
- Resolution of the Comintern on the Macedonian question
- Yugoslav Macedonia during WWII
- Bulgaria during World War II
- Bled agreement (1947)
