= Pavel Shatev =

Revolutionary from Macedonia (1882–1951)

Pavel Potsev Shatev
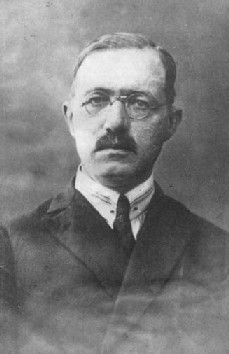
- Born: July 15, 1882; Kratovo, Ottoman Empire
- Died: January 30, 1951 (aged 68); Bitola, Socialist Federal Republic of Yugoslavia
- Education: Sofia University
- Occupations: Teacher and lawyer
- Organization(s): Boatmen of Thessaloniki; IMRO; MFO; IMRO (United)
- Known for: Thessaloniki bombings

Pavel Potsev Shatev (Bulgarian and Macedonian: Павел Поцев Шатев, romanized: Pavel Pocev Šatev; July 15, 1882 – January 30, 1951) was an anarchist, socialist, revolutionary, lawyer, and member of the left wing of the Internal Macedonian Revolutionary Organization (IMRO) from Macedonia. As a member of the anarchist group Boatmen of Thessaloniki, he participated in the Thessaloniki bombings in 1903. Following World War I, Shatev worked as an agent of the Soviet Union and the Communist International. In 1945 he became Minister of Justice in the government of Democratic Federal Macedonia. After the Tito–Stalin split, he was persecuted by the Yugoslav authorities. His persona was considered a taboo in Yugoslav Macedonia but it was rehabilitated after the country gained its independence.

== Biography ==
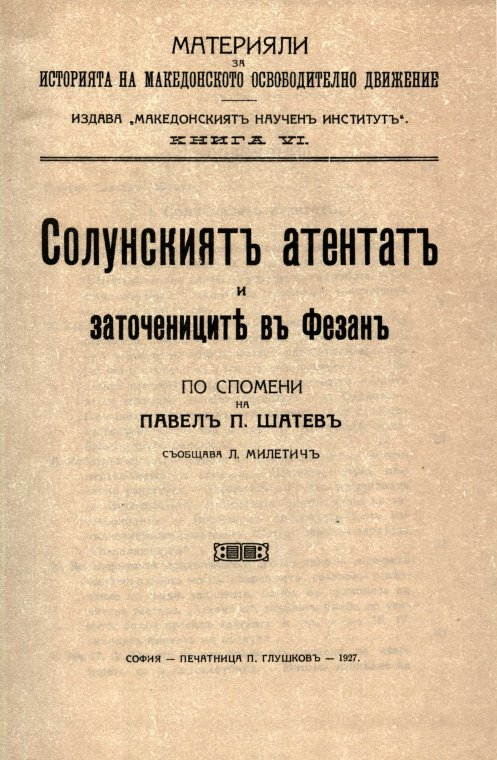
The Thessalonica assassination and the exiles in Fezzan, published in 1927 in Sofia as the second edition of his prison memoir by the Macedonian Scientific Institute.

Born in Kratovo on July 15, 1882, into a wealthy merchant family, in the Kosovo vilayet of the Ottoman Empire (present-day North Macedonia), Shatev graduated from the Bulgarian Men's High School of Thessaloniki in 1900. He became a member of the anarchist group Boatmen of Thessaloniki, being one of its youngest members. In 1901-1902, he was appointed as a teacher in the village Lesnovo. In late April 1903, as part of the Boatmen, he participated in a campaign of terror bombing known as the Thessaloniki bombings. On April 28, Shatev bought a ticket, boarding the French passenger ship Guadalquivir with a suitcase full of dynamite, which he exploded as the ship left port. All of the passengers and crew survived, who were saved and moved to the shore in lifeboats, together with their possessions, along with Shatev. Shatev was later tracked down and arrested at the Skopje Railway station, because he was the only passenger who did not claim his possessions and ask for a refund for his ticket, as well as due to a description by a crew member. He was tried by a Turkish military court along with fellow anarchists Marko Boshnakov, Georgi Bogdanov and Milan Arsov, which sentenced them to death. Under Russian and Austro-Hungarian pressure, the sentence was later commuted to life imprisonment, and the four were sent to exile in the town of Murzuk in Fezzan. In 1906, Shatev went along with other 50 prisoners from Ottoman Macedonia across the Sahara desert, starting from Tripoli on June 28. It took them a month to reach their destination. Shatev and Bogdanov survived, and were amnestied after the Young Turk Revolution in 1908. In 1910, he published his prison memoir in Sofia, based on the journal he kept while in exile. There he recalled the hardships he endured along with other prisoners.

In this period, he became more socialistic. He worked as a professor in the Thessaloniki Trade Academy. Shatev went to Brussels to study law in 1912, but he completed his studies at Sofia University. Shatev settled in Bulgaria, where he was apparently received as a national hero. During World War I, he worked as part of the military counterintelligence (Military Police Section at the Headquarters of the Bulgarian Army) in Niš. He was a member of the left wing of the Internal Macedonian Revolutionary Organization (IMRO). After the war, he was a representative of the Kratovo Brotherhood at the Constituent Assembly of the Union of Macedonian Emigrant Organizations, held in Sofia. In 1921, Shatev became a member of the Macedonian Federative Organization. In 1923, Shatev became an intelligence officer of the Soviet Union and the Communist International. Shatev was the middleman in the negotiations over the May Manifesto between the Comintern and IMRO. After Todor Aleksandrov's murder, to escape death due to his leftist allegiance, he settled in Istanbul and then moved to Vienna, where he took part in the establishment of the Internal Macedonian Revolutionary Organization (United) in 1925. Shatev was part of the national revolutionary wing of IMRO (United). In 1927, the second edition of his prison memoir, titled The Thessalonica assassination and the exiles in Fezzan, was published in 1927 in Sofia by the Macedonian Scientific Institute (MSI), edited by Lyubomir Miletich. In the same year, he went to Moscow to participate in the ten-year anniversary of the October Revolution, at the invitation of the Soviet government. In 1931, he returned to Bulgaria as a Soviet agent, while also working as a lawyer. Shatev was among those who emphasized the national character of the Macedonians in writings for IMRO (United). He described Macedonians as having their own history, politics, and culture, though without regard to "confession and nationality", not as ethnic Macedonians.

Before World War II, he re-established contact with the Soviet intelligence service. During the war, he was the organizer and manager of its underground communication center in Sofia. He was arrested in November 1941 by the Bulgarian police. After narrowly escaping the death sentence, he was sentenced to 15 years in prison in July 1942 as a pro-Soviet saboteur. Released after the communist coup d'état on September 9, 1944, Shatev returned to Vardar Macedonia and joined Anti-fascist Assembly for the National Liberation of Macedonia's presidium. Shatev took part in the creation of the new Democratic Federal Macedonia as part of Democratic Federal Yugoslavia. He signed the "Appeal to the Macedonians in Bulgaria", along with other leftists. In 1945, he became a member of MSI. In 1945 he was elected Minister of Justice in the first communist government.

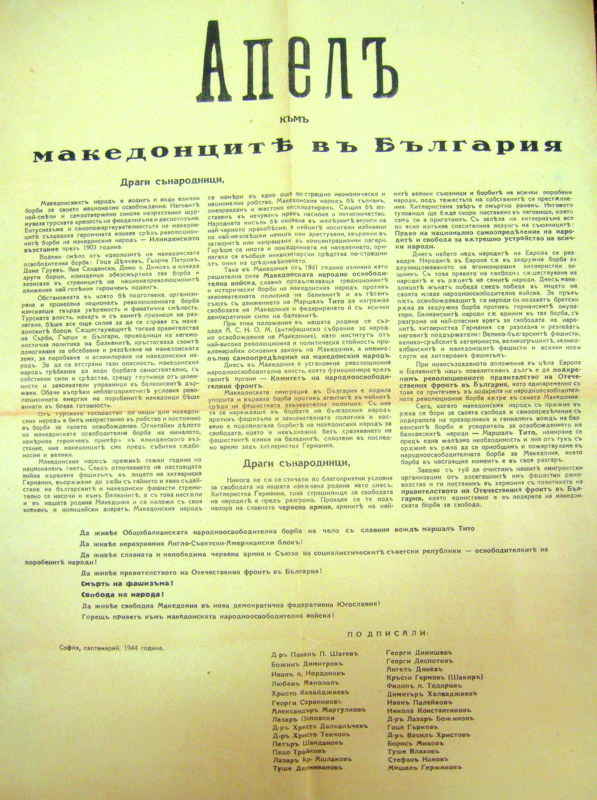
Appeal to the Macedonians in Bulgaria during WWII, one of the signatures was Shatev himself.

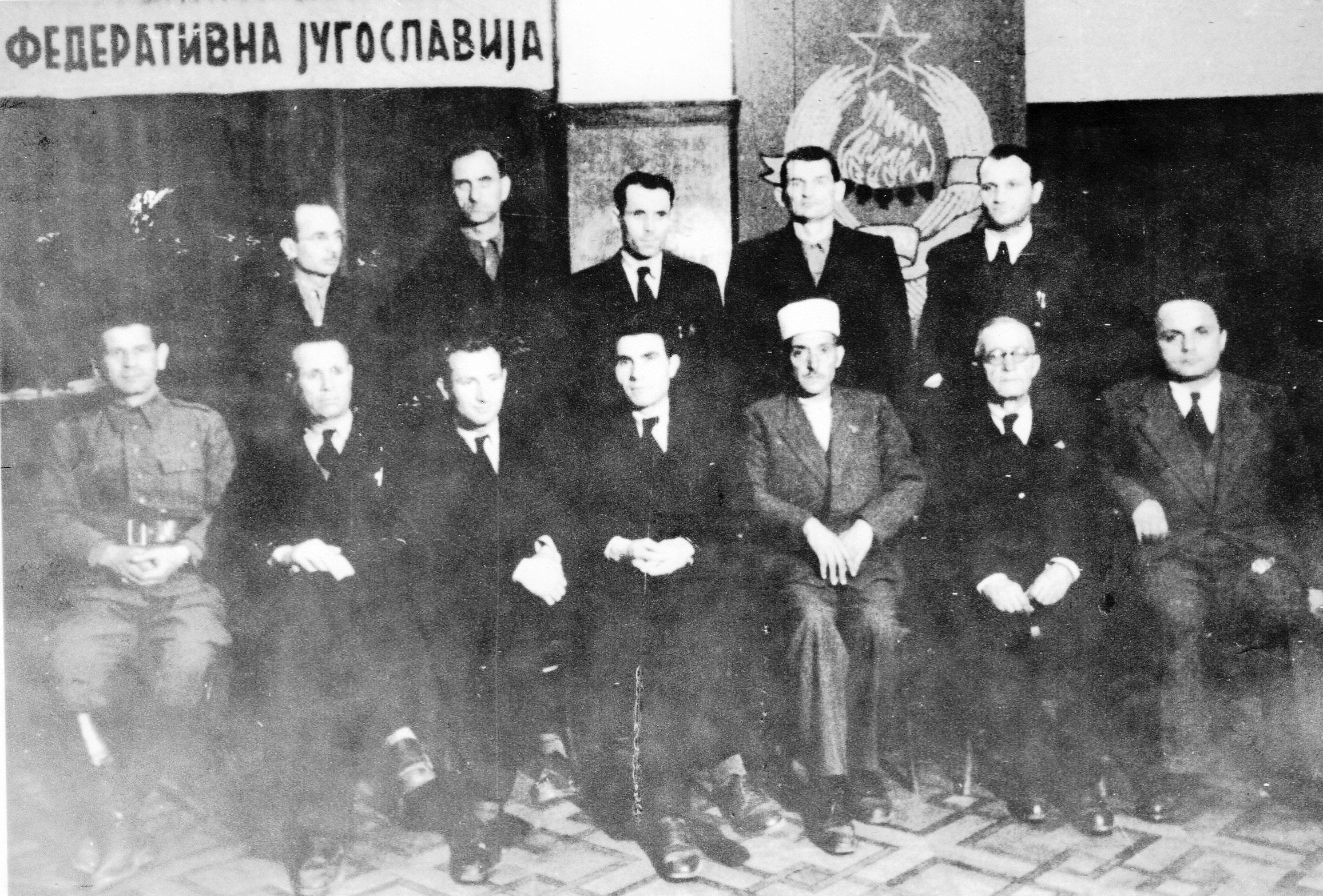
Shatev (sitting second from right to left) as member of the first government of Democratic Federal Macedonia.

In early 1945, courts to try offenses against "Macedonian national honor" were created and show trials occurred in PR Macedonia. In late February 1945, Yugoslav leader Josip Broz Tito summoned him, Metodija Andonov-Čento, Dimitar Vlahov and Mihailo Apostolski for a meeting to try to dissuade demands for immediate action against Greece, although he also still had his own ambitions regarding northern Greece then. In August 1945, Shatev told a British official that the courts for the protection of the "Macedonian national honor" had to be abolished and that there was a lack of "properly trained jurists". Shatev regarded the Macedonian alphabet as being under the influence of Serbian. In 1946, Shatev wrote a complaint to the Bulgarian embassy in Belgrade, in which he argued that the new Macedonian language is Serbianized and the use of Bulgarian language is prohibited in Macedonia and required the intervention of the Bulgarian leader Georgi Dimitrov. Shatev lost his position as minister of justice in the first reshuffle in January 1947. In 1948, disappointed with the policy of the new Yugoslav authorities, Shatev, together with Panko Brashnarov, complained in letters to Joseph Stalin and to Georgi Dimitrov and asked for help in maintaining better relations with Bulgaria and the Soviet Union. According to British sources, he later tried to negotiate with the Bulgarian authorities the frontiers of PR Macedonia, independently from Yugoslavia. In Sofia, Shatev appealed to the secretary of the Central Committee of the Bulgarian Communist Party, Traycho Kostov, with a request to intercede against the anti-Bulgarian policy in PR Macedonia. The Tito–Stalin split resulted in the persecution of pro-Bulgarian Macedonians, such as him and Brashnarov. He was later jailed for his alleged pro-Bulgarian and anti-Yugoslav sympathies. Shatev was detained in Skopje prison for 11 months, and then interned in Bitola, where he was kept under house arrest until his death on January 30, 1951. His body was found in a dunghill. Afterwards, his personality became a taboo in SFR Yugoslavia.

== Views and influences ==
His memoirs were under Russian and anarchist influences. In Thessaloniki's prison of Yedikule, he saw people who were feeling themselves "only as Bulgarians" but there were also Bulgarians who felt as "Macedonians" above everything else. In an interview in 1908 with Miletich, Shatev claimed that he had read major anarchist works before the Thessaloniki bombings, such as Sergey Stepnyak's Underground Russia. Shatev thought that only the Soviet Union was successful in resolving the national question through its creation of federal national units and local ethnic autonomies. However, when he had in mind the region of Macedonia, he rejected the Stalinist definition of nation based on a common territory. He did not think that integrating national communities into a multi-ethnic and socialist state was a bad idea. Shatev did not like the prominent role of teachers in IMRO's local committees and opined that "in its composition, its location, its hierarchy and bureaucracy, the Central Committee was practically indistinguishable from the Exarchate as a spiritual centre." In his 1934 memoir, Shatev claimed that he was always a socialist rather than an anarchist in an argument with anarchist Petar Mandzhukov, writing that anarchists were leading "wild politics", leading to a physical fight between him and Mandzhukov.

== Legacy ==
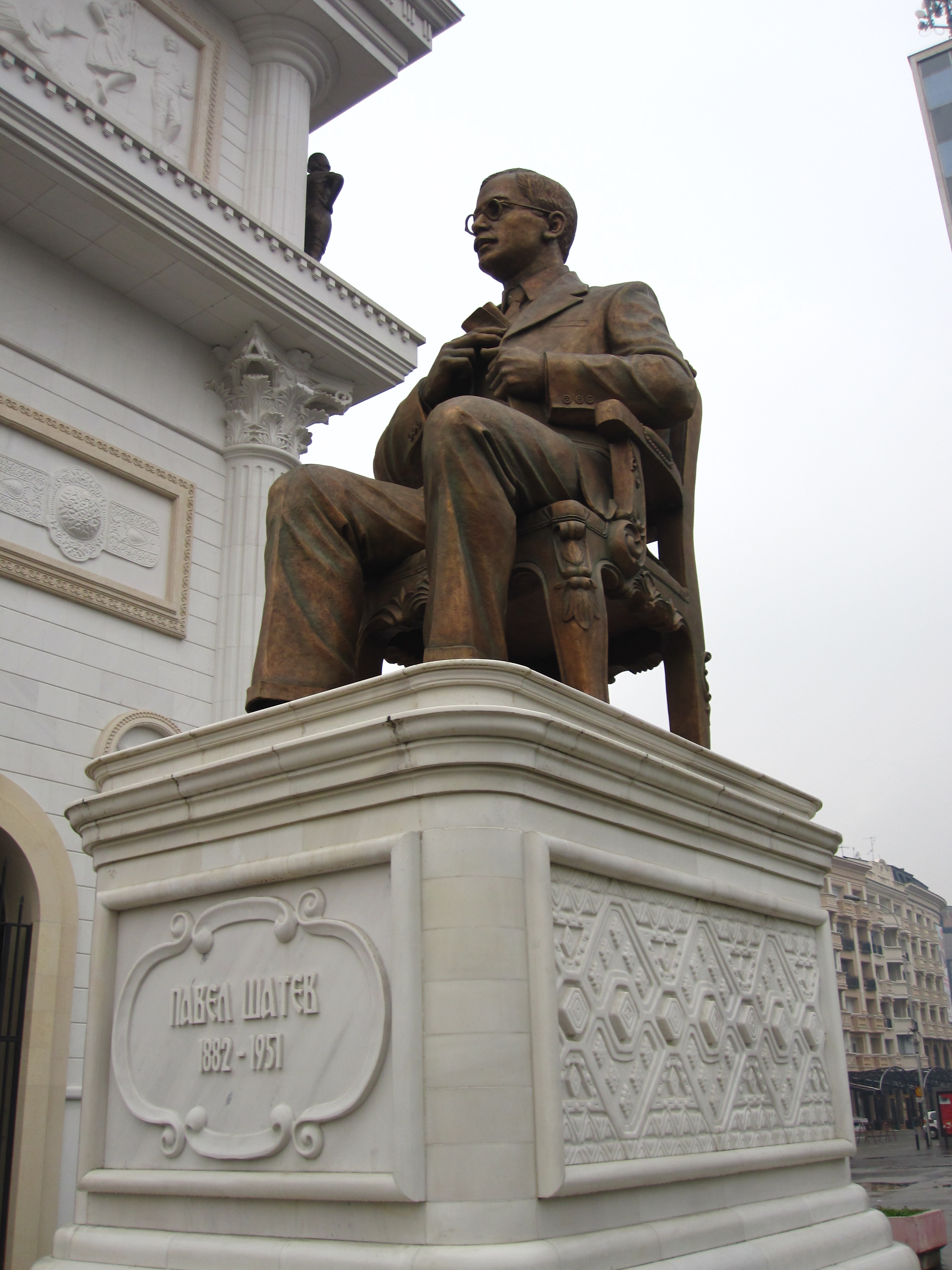
Monument of Pavel Shatev in Skopje.

The fate of Shatev was exploited by Bulgarian historians during the Communist era in favor of their cause in Macedonia. After the break-up of Yugoslavia he was rehabilitated in the new Republic of Macedonia (now North Macedonia) as an unjustly accused of Bulgarophilia by the Titoist regime and a Macedonian patriot. His memoirs were published in Macedonian in 1994. Although Shatev is considered a Macedonian by the Macedonian historiography, per Macedonian researcher Anastas Vangeli, he identified himself as Bulgarian. In North Macedonia, he was praised as a hero of the political right during the 2010s, who ignored his revolutionary anarchist and later communist views. In 2008, VMRO-DPMNE established a conservative institute bearing his name. In 2010, the government erected a monument of him and his anarchist terrorist group.

== Gallery ==
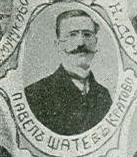
Young Pavel Shatev

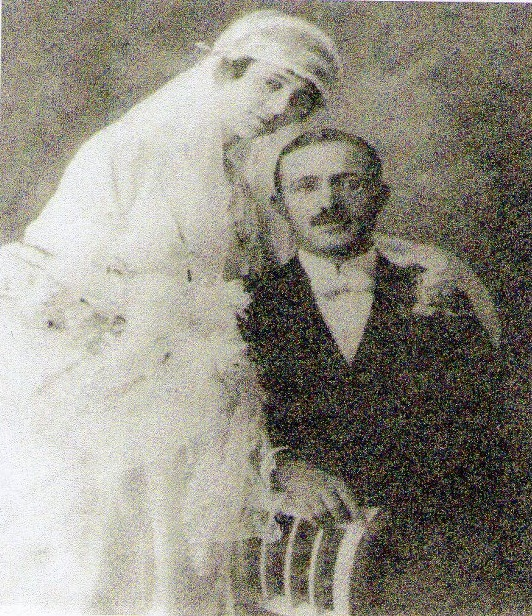
Shatev with his wife on their wedding day in 1919

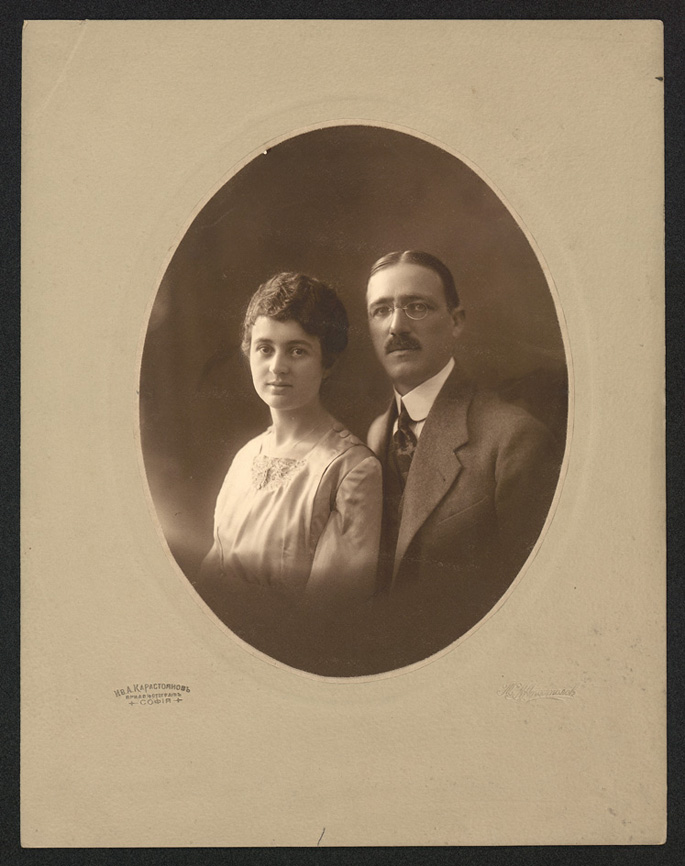
Shatev and his wife Vera during the interwar period

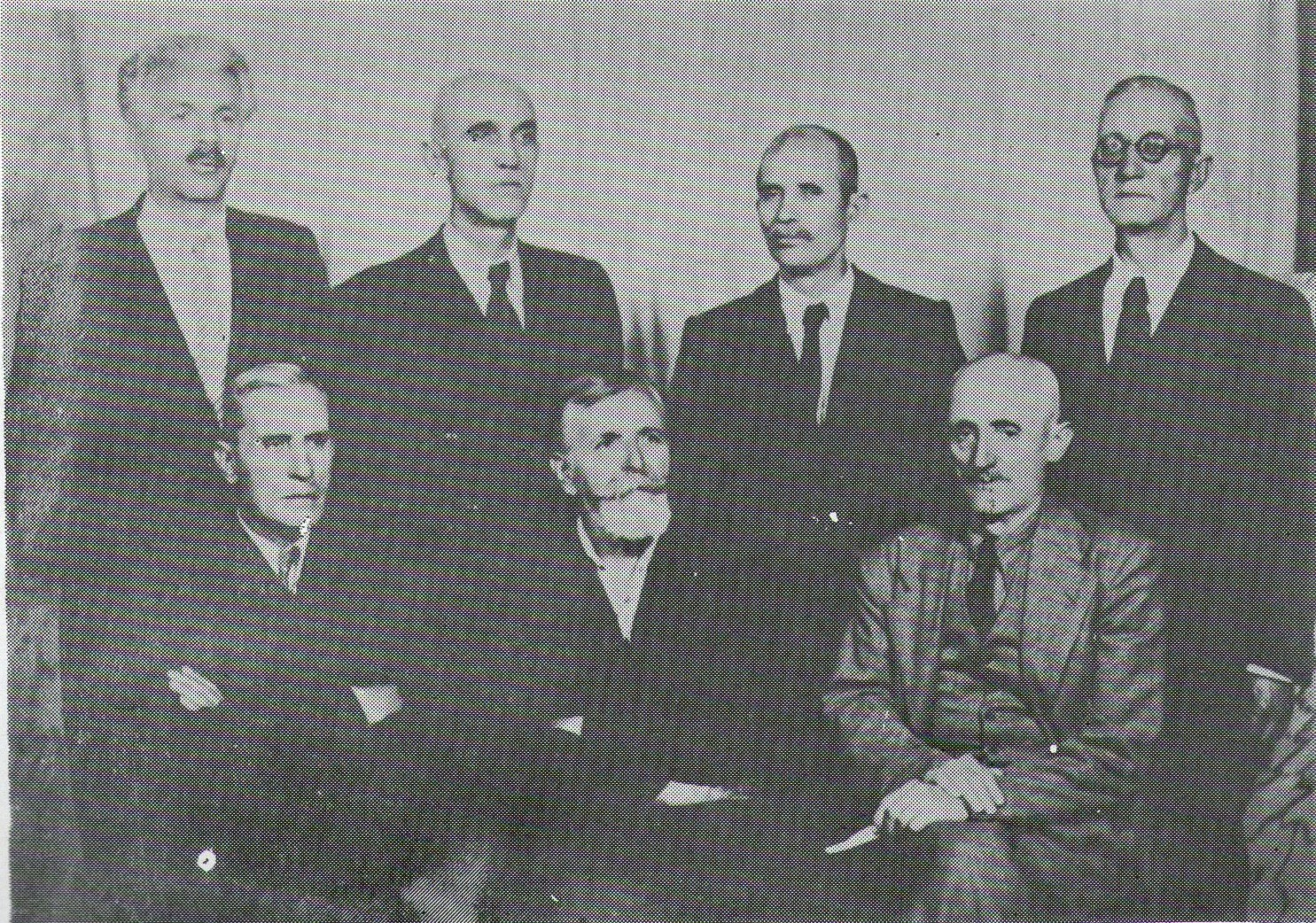
Shatev with Rizov, Brashnarov, Martulkov and other former IMARO members in 1948

== Literature ==
- "В Македония под Робство; Солунското Съзаклятие (1903 г.), Подготовка и Изпълнение" "In Macedonia under Slavery", first edition
- "Бележки върху Българската Просвета в Македония" (Notes on the Bulgarian Enlightenment in Macedonia), публикувана в "Сборник Солун", Sofia, 1934
