= Alekso Martulkov =

Macedonian socialist (1878–1962)

- Алексо Мартулков
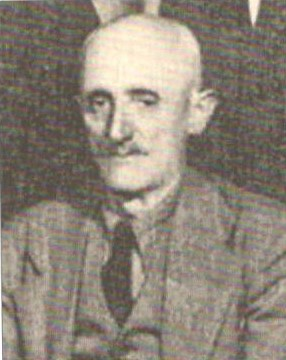
- Born: 23 October 1878; Veles, Kosovo Vilayet, Ottoman Empire
- Died: 19 December 1962 (aged 84); Sofia, People's Republic of Bulgaria
- Other names: "Bismarck"
- Notable work: My Participation in the Revolutionary Struggles of Macedonia
- Honours: Bulgarian "Medal of Merit" (Bronze) Yugoslavian "Medal of Merit for the People" Macedonian "Ilinden Memoirs"

Alekso Martulkov (Macedonian and Bulgarian: Алексо Мартулков), born as Aleksandar Onchev Martulkov (Macedonian: Александар Ончев Мартулков, Bulgarian: Александър Ончев Мартулков; 23 October 1878 — 19 December 1962), was a publicist and one of the first socialist revolutionaries from the region of Macedonia. He was a member of the Bulgarian Workers' Social Democratic Party and later the People's Federative Party (Bulgarian Section) and the Bulgarian Communist Party. Simultaneously, he was a member of the IMRO and subsequently the IMRO (United). He advocated for the independence of Macedonia. Martulkov was also a member of the Bulgarian Parliament, as well as the Presidium of ASNOM and the parliament of SR Macedonia. He is considered a Macedonian in the Macedonian historiography and a Bulgarian in the Bulgarian historiography.

== Early life ==
Martulkov was born in 1878 in Veles, then part of the Ottoman Empire. His father, Jovan Martulkov, worked as a baker in a local factory, while his mother was employed as a gardener for a wealthy family. He had an older brother who later became a teacher at a local school in Bitola. Martulkov lost both of his parents at the age of eight due to the family's impoverished conditions.

He studied in his hometown, where he was undisciplined and often argued with other students which eventually led to his expulsion. He later completed his elementary education in Bitola, and began his secondary education in the Bulgarian Pedagogical School in Skopje. He developed revolutionary and anti-monarchist views, influenced by Petar Mandzhukov, as well as socialist-focused views, for which he was inspired by one of his teachers in Skopje. In 1898, he and a group of other students formed a secret socialist group within the school.

The group was soon discovered by the school authorities, and Martulkov was expelled from the school. During this period, he lived at his grandparents house. Subsequently, He later moved to Sofia, where he became active in the Macedonian-Adrianople Social Democratic Group. Afterward, he relocated to Geneva, Switzerland, to study chemistry but returned to Sofia after one year.

Afterwards, Martulkov returned to Ottoman Macedonia where he joined the IMARO. He worked in Veles and Kumanovo and helped wounded revolutionaries during the 1903 llinden-Preobrazhenie Uprising. Afterwards, he was a teacher in the Bulgarian school in his hometown. In the autumn of 1907 he participated in a meeting in Sofia with other IMRO revolutionaries, discussing the Macedonian question. After the 1908 Young Turk Revolution, he joined the People's Federative Party (Bulgarian Section).

== During The Balkan Wars and World War I ==
During the Balkan Wars, he and other former IMARO revolutionaries, such as Petar Poparsov and Rizo Rizov, met with Dimitrija Čupovski, they would make an appeal to the local residents from Veles which would be sent to the London Conference, demanding autonomy for Macedonia. According to Martulkov out of the 400 signers around 300 of them were either Turkish or from Turkish origins. On the eve of the Second Balkan War in 1913, he was sent by Todor Aleksandrov on a reconnaissance mission in the area of Macedonia controlled by Serbia.

In 1914, he fled to Sofia to avoid being drafted by the Serbian authorities. He participated in IMARO's committee of deserters, which was organized by other former soldiers from the Serbian army such as Nikola Voynicalev, Yordan Shurkov, Nikola Panev, Nikola Yanev, Georgi Bogdanov and many more. The recruitment was organized mostly in Veles and Skopje, its main task was to help people from Macedonia leave the Serbian Army and join the Bulgarian Army instead. It has been documented that he helped around 1.500 deserters. While mobilizing around 2.500 from the Veles regiment and the Kocani regiment with 2.400. as well as helping out a small force located in Bitola and Shtip. Later during the First World War, on the occasion of the 15th anniversary of the Ilinden Uprising, he was awarded with a Bulgarian bronze medal. Around this time he also participated in the Veles Brotherhood in Sofia.

== After World War I ==
During the mid-1920s, he became one of the first members of the newly formed IMRO (United). In 1931, together with Hristo Traykov, he was threatened with physical violence by Ivan Mihaylov's IMRO faction, because he spread communist ideas among the Macedonian emigration in Bulgaria. Hristo Traikov was killed by activists of Ivan Mihailov's wing who also worked with Aleksandar Protogerov such as Pavel Karakashev, but Martulkov escaped with only injuries.

=== Macedonian Flag period (1932 - 1934) ===
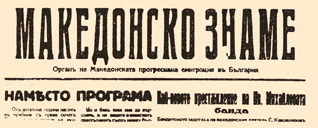
Photo of the first issue from the newspaper "Macedonian Flag" with its main editor being Alekso Martulkov.

On June 14, 1932, in Sofia Martulkov and Naumov published the first article of the newspaper "Macedonian Flag" (Makedonsko Zname) which was an organ of the IMROU for immigrants from Macedonia in Bulgaria, he published an issue once a week and the newspaper lasted between 1932 and 1934 when it would be eventually banned after the 1934 military coup in Bulgaria.

In his newspapers he actively criticized the current state of IMRO stating that the only reason it fought for autonomous Macedonia was to just unite it with Bulgaria. Vasil Ivanovski helped in contributing in the newspaper. The newspapers program was mostly focused on helping out and promoting socialist and pro-Macedonian views amongst the immigrants in Blagoevgrad province and some in Sofia.

=== Arrest period (1935 - 1939) ===
At that time he still did not accept the Comintern's position from 1934 on the existence of a separate Macedonian nation. He was one of the 32 people's representatives of the Bulgarian Communist Party in the Bulgarian Parliament.

In the summer of 1935, he was arrested in Sofia, while being a deputy in the Bulgarian parliament. and tried along with other members of the IMRO (United). At the trial, Martulkov, declared himself as "Bulgarian" and denied his membership in the IMRO (United). The court characterized the organization as anti-state and pro-communist one, aiming through an armed uprising to change the state system and harm the territorial integrity of the country. Martulkov was sentenced to 5 years in prison and was ordered to pay a fine.

== During and after World War II ==
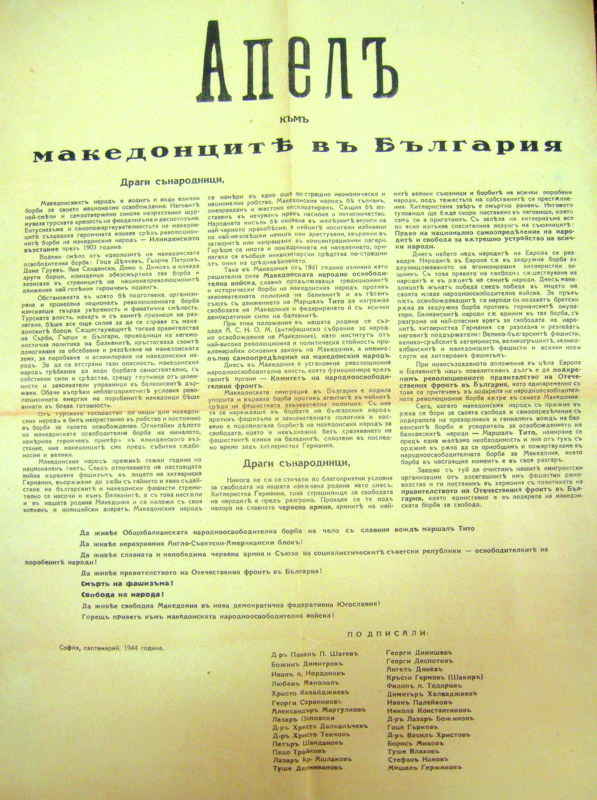
The Appeal to the Macedonians in Bulgaria, recognizing a separate Macedonian people. One of the signatories is Aleksandar Martulkov.

Before the annexation of Yugoslav Macedonia by Bulgaria in the spring of 1941, he participated in a group of like-minded activists who initiated the creation of Bulgarian Action Committees there.

After the 1944 Bulgarian coup d'état he signed the Appeal to the Macedonians in Bulgaria along with other prominent revolutionaries, such as Pavel Shatev, Tushe Deliivanov, Petar Shandanov, Mihail Gerdzhikov and others, which agitated for a Macedonian state within Yugoslavia and accepted the Comintern's position on the Macedonian nation. After the Second World War, he moved to the PR Macedonia, where he participated in ASNOM. He would be elected as an honorary member in The Association of Macedonian Journalists. In 1945, Martulkov met with Georgi Dimitrov in Sofia and mentioned his concerns on some of the pro-Serbian and anti-Bulgarian policies of the Communist Party of Macedonia, which he believed was an attempt of Serbianisation of the local population in Macedonia. He asked Dimitrov to intervene to change this policy.

Due to his contributions to Yugoslavia, he was awarded the Yugoslav Medal of Merit for the People. As an Ilinden Uprising veteran, he was awarded the Macedonian medal of Ilinden Memoirs in 1951. Later Martulkov, as many of the older left-wing IMRO government officials, was removed from his high position, and then isolated. He retired in Skopje. At the end of his life, disappointed with the policy of the new authorities in Yugoslavia, Martulkov returned to Sofia, where he died on 19 December 1962.

== Memoirs ==
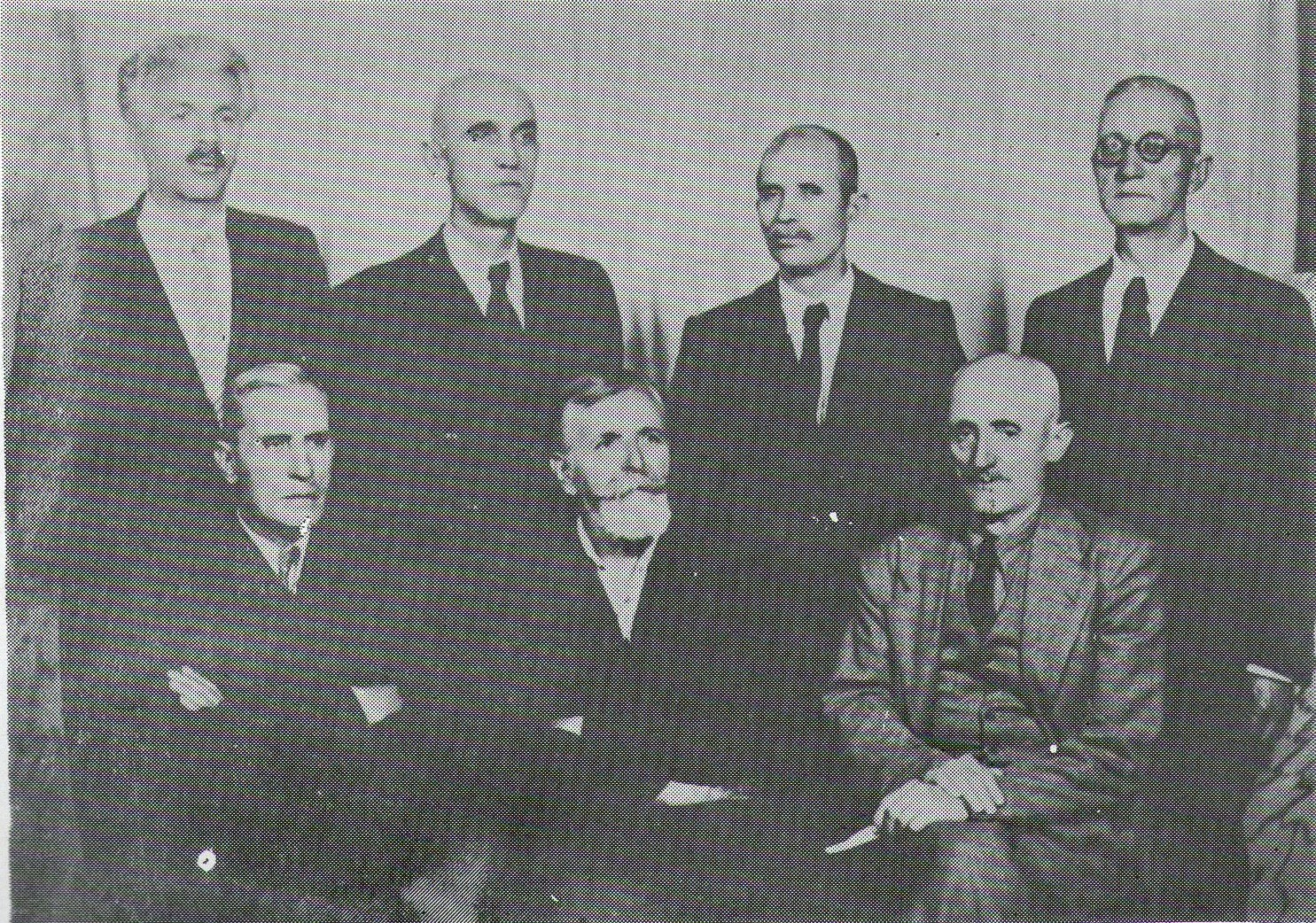
Alekso Martulkov sitting with other former IMRO (United) revolutionaries in the newly formed Socialist Republic of Macedonia

In 1954 Martulkovs' Memoirs would be published in Macedonian by the Institute of National History. The preface is written by Gjorgi Abadžiev. In the book Martulkov gives a detailed biography of his life and early childhood and his troubling experience with the Ottoman authorities in Istanbul. In his memoirs he also mentions stories with his parents and grandparents and his experience with them, as well as writing about the Internal Macedonian Revolutionary Organization and its struggle as well as its divisions and tensions about the fight against the Ottoman Empire and the various national propagandas spread by neighboring states during the Macedonian Struggle.

He also talks about his role and influence over IMRO (United) and his experience meeting other revolutionaries. In his book he tells stories about his time migrating from Veles to Bulgaria and his time spend in Bulgaria. He also writes about how he met Pavel Shatev and other boatmen of Thessaloniki, how he helped organizing the Ilinden Uprising in the Veles and Kumanovo regions under the Skopje revolutionary district

== Related Pages ==
- Internal Macedonian Revolutionary Organization
- Macedonian Struggle
- Internal Macedonian Revolutionary Organization (United)
