= Rizo Rizov =

Socialist revolutionary from the region of Macedonia

- Ризо Ризов
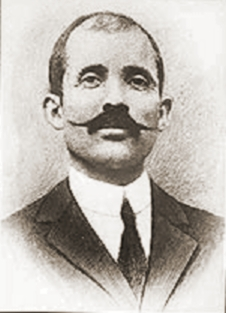
- Born: 1 January 1872; Veles, Kosovo Vilayet, Ottoman Empire (present-day North Macedonia)
- Died: 6 January 1950; Skopje, PR Macedonia, FPR Yugoslavia (present-day North Macedonia)

Rizo Rizov (Macedonian and Bulgarian: Ризо Ризов; 1 January 1872 — 6 January 1950) was a revolutionary from Veles and a participant in the Macedonian revolutionary movement. He was a member of the Internal Macedonian Adrianople Revolutionary Organization and was one of the founders of the People's Federative Party (Bulgarian Section) and IMRO (United).

As with many other IMRO members of the time, historians from North Macedonia consider him an ethnic Macedonian and in Bulgaria he is considered a Bulgarian.

== Biography ==
Rizov was a teacher in his hometown of Veles. He was a member of the district committee of the IMARO. In 1904 he was shot by a member of the Supreme Macedonian-Adrianople Committee.

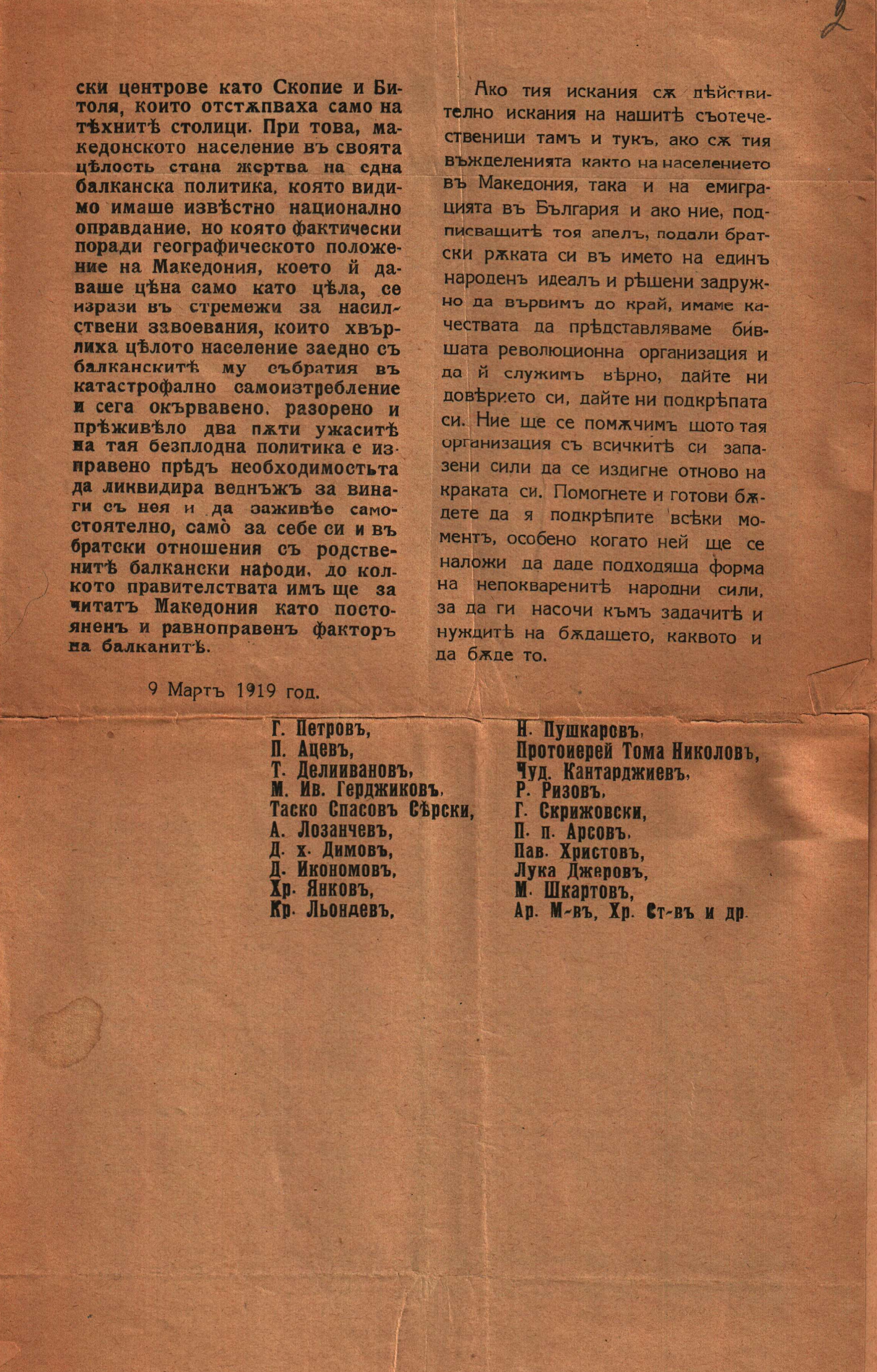
The final page of the Appeal that Rizov signed, along with other members of the Provisional representation of the former United Internal Revolutionary Organization.

During the Balkan Wars, he and other former IMARO revolutionaries, such as Petar Poparsov and Alekso Martulkov, met with Dimitrija Čupovski, who proposed to send a delegation to London conference, which would demand autonomy for Macedonia.

Rizov went to Thessaloniki with the hope of gaining the support of the IMARO. He met with Pavel Shatev and Yordan Ivanov, who rejected this idea.

On 9 March 1919, while in Sofia, he signed the "Appeal to the Macedonian population and to the émigré population in Bulgaria", issued by the Provisional representation of the former United Internal Revolutionary Organization.

In 1925, alongside other IMRO members, Rizov participated in Vienna in the founding conference of IMRO (United). He became a member of the Central Committee of the organization.

At the end of 1930, due to illness, he left Vienna and went to the Soviet Union. In 1945, he moved to the newly found Yugoslav People's Republic of Macedonia, where he died in 1950.
