= Gjorgi Abadžiev =

Macedonian prosaist and publicist (1910–1963)

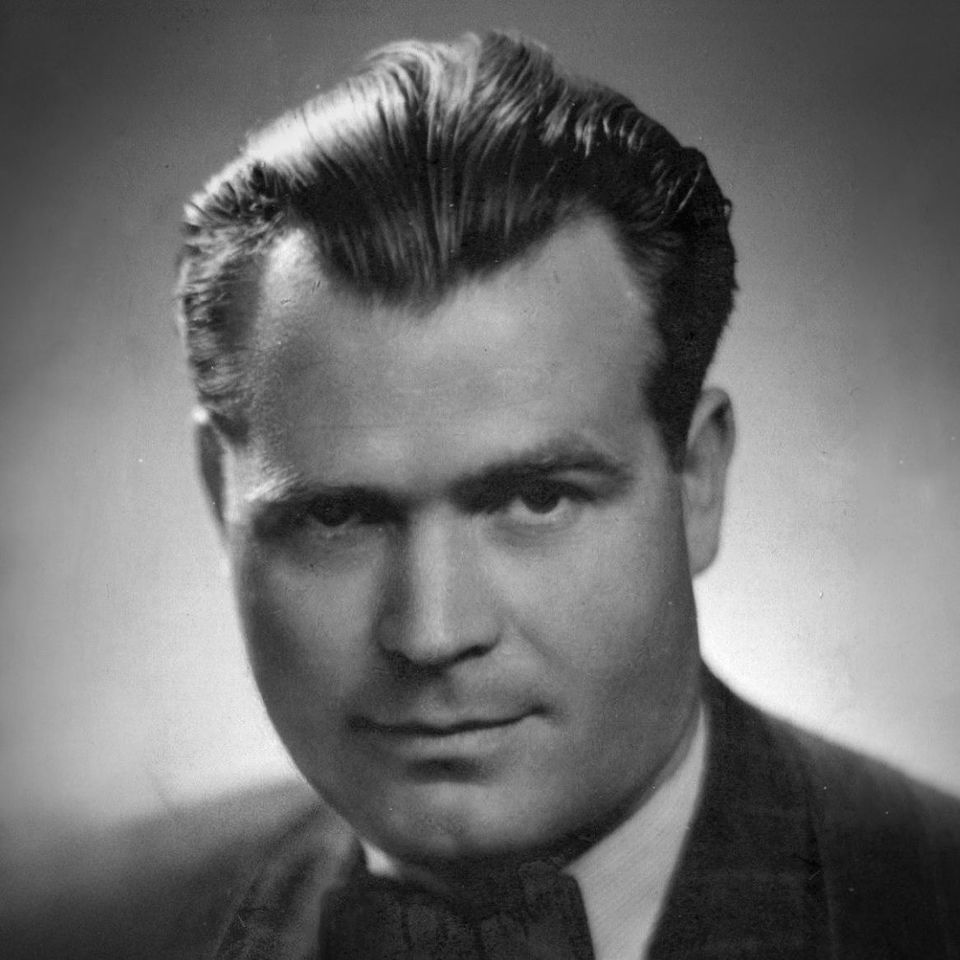
Gjorgi Abadžiev in 1940

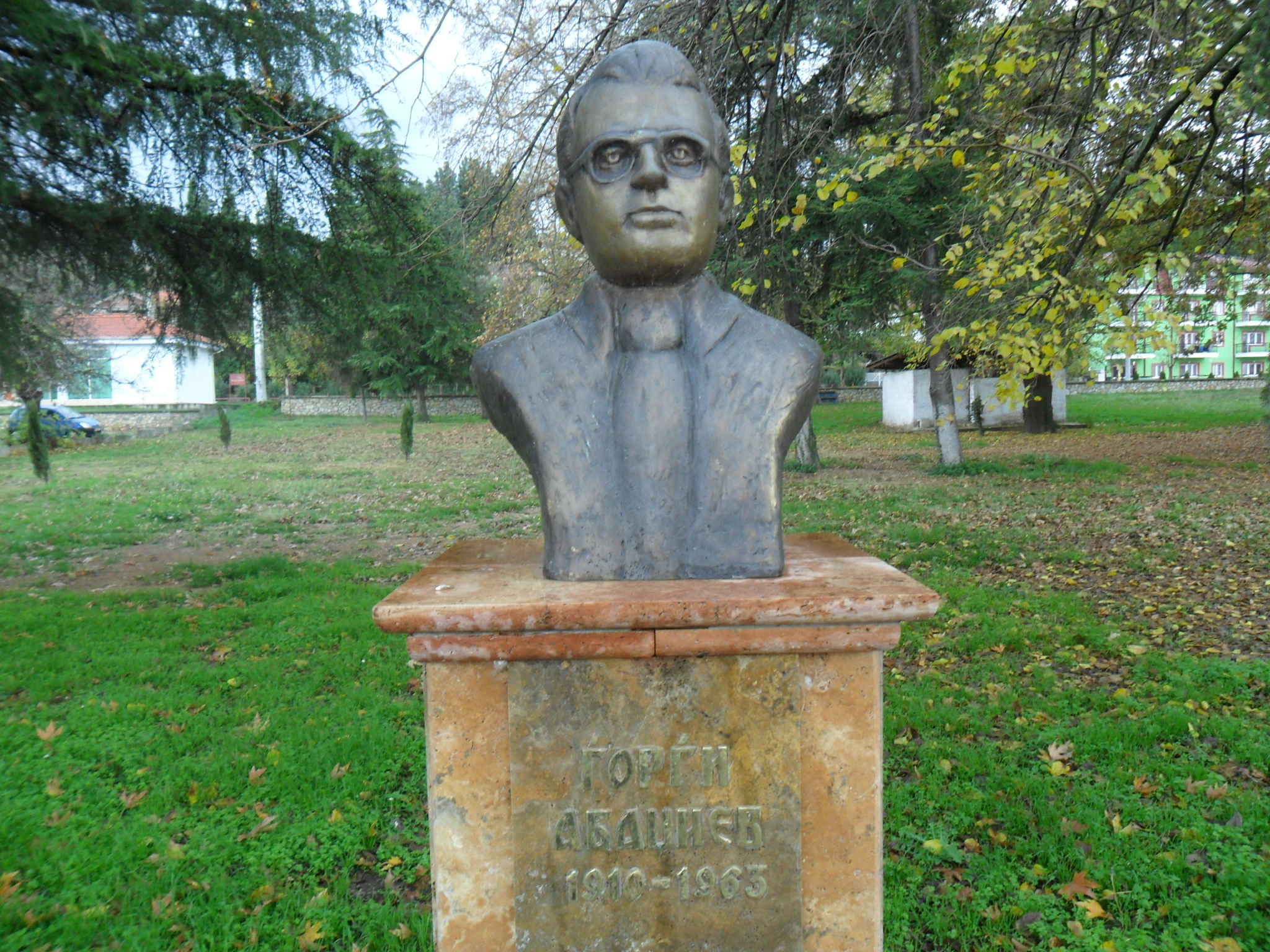
Bust of Gjorgji Abadžiev

Gjorgi Abadžiev (Macedonian: Ѓорѓи Абаџиев; Bulgarian: Георги Абаджиев; also spelled Georgi Abadzhiev; 7 October 1910 in Dojran, Ottoman Empire – 2 August 1963 in Skopje, SFR Yugoslavia) was a Macedonian prosaist and publicist.

From 1915 to 1948 he lived in Bulgaria where he studied at the Faculty of Law in Sofia University (1932–1937).

Later he moved to SR Macedonia where he became a historian and writer. Abadžiev died on 2 August 1963 in Skopje. He published his works in Bulgarian, Macedonian and Serbian.

== Novel collections ==
- Труд и хора (1936) (in Bulgarian)
- Izgrev (1951)
- Posledna sredba (1953)
- Aramijsko gnezdo (1954)
- Pustina (1961)
- Балканските војни во Македонија (1972)
