= Spiro Gulabchev =

Bulgarian revolutionary (1856–1918)

- Спиро Гулабчев
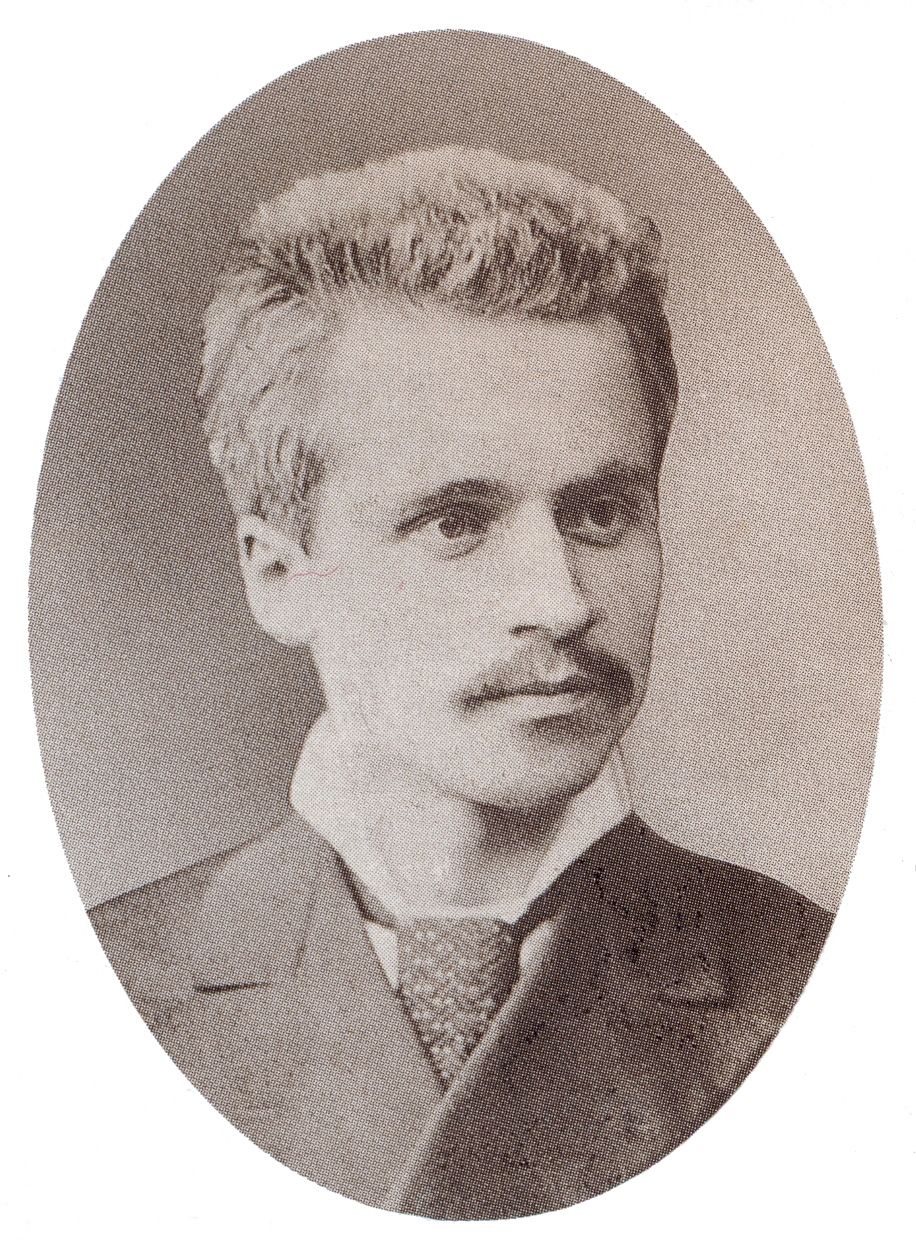
- Spiro Gulabchev in 1880
- Born: Spiro Konstantinov Gulabchev; 12 June 1856; Florina (Lerin), Ottoman Empire
- Died: January 1918 (aged 61); Sofia, Bulgaria
- Movement: Siromahilstvo, anarchism

Spiro Konstantinov Gulabchev (Note: His name is variably also given as Gulapchev.) (12 June 1856 – January 1918) was a Bulgarian anarchist known for leading the siromahomilstvo movement, a Bulgarian left-wing, populist, and Russian nihilist movement that sought to create a society which protected the poorest among them. An avid opponent of inequality, and holding communitarian beliefs, Gulabchev organized educational associations and activities for the poor in multiple towns as clubs and libraries, through which he actively advocated for revolutionary action. In late 1880s, the siromakhomilstvo split between anarchism and socialism, with Gulabchev advocating for the former. In 1892, he formed an anarchist study group in Ruse.

== Early life ==
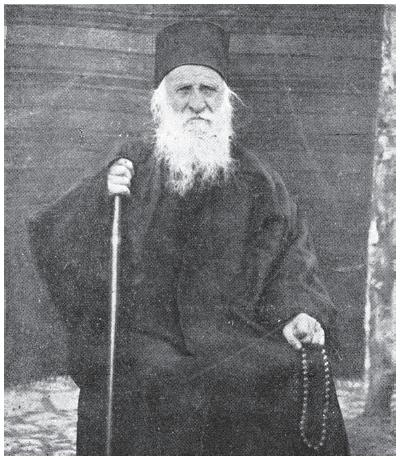
Gulabchev's father, a Bulgarian Exarchate priest.

Spiro Gulabchev was born on 12 June 1856 in Florina (known as Lerin in Bulgarian), the Ottoman Empire (today in Greece), to Catherine Gulabchev and Konstantin, a priest who was active in the Bulgarian Revival movement and headed a church of the Bulgarian Exarchate in Lerin. He was educated at a primary and secondary level in Constantinople, Edirne, and Plovdiv, throughout which his peers included Dimitar Blagoev, whom Gulabchev would later oppose.

In 1870 Gulabchev found work as a teacher in the village of Gorno Nevolyani, where he introduced the monitorial system of education. He initially taught in both Greek and Bulgarian but, by his second year, had begun to teach entirely in Bulgarian, providing his students with Bulgarian textbooks and teaching them to read and write.

Gulabchev was a favourite of both students and parents, but as news began to spread of his father's schismatic leanings (and as the Bulgarian Schism was reaching its climax), Gulabchev was pushed out of Gorno Nevolyani. In autumn of 1871 he left for Plovdiv to see a relative, Panaret Plovdivski.

== University and political radicalisation ==
In 1877 Gulabchev traveled to the Russian Empire, where he enrolled at the Moscow Theological Academy and studied for two years before transferring to Moscow State University to study law. Before completing the course, however, he once again transferred in 1881, this time to study philology at the Faculty of History and Philology at Kiev University. His study was funded through scholarships and grants provided by Eastern Rumelia (and then by the Principality of Bulgaria following Bulgaria's unification in 1885).

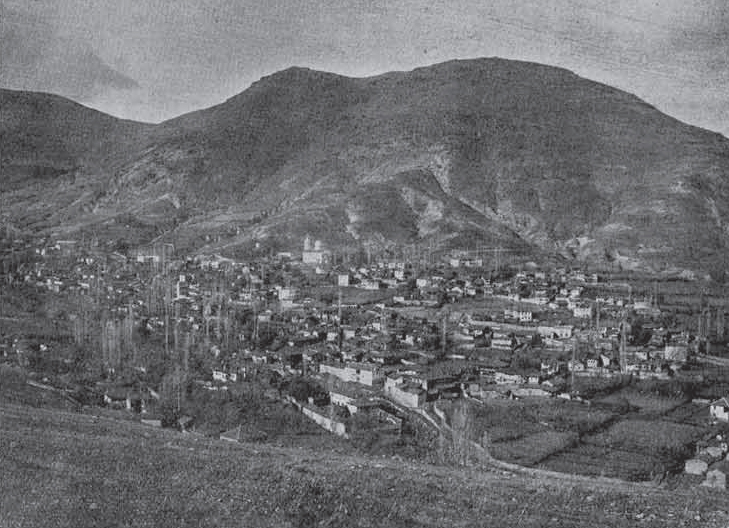
The village of Gorno Nevolyani c. 1900 – c. 1920, where Gulabchev spent 1870 – 1871 teaching.

Gulabchev and his father nevertheless experienced financial trouble during this period, which threatened Gulabchev's ability to complete his course. Eventually, Gulabchev wrote a letter to Joseph I of Bulgaria in which he asked for financial assistance for his father, so that he may afford to complete his education.

While studying in Kiev, Gulabchev was exposed to the agrarian socialist and populist movements that had begun to emerge within the Russian intelligentsia; in particular, he came under the influence of the ideas of "popular enlightenment" proposed by the Narodniks and the conspiratorial revolutionary socialist methods of Narodnaya Volya. He was also impressed by the liberal values of the Enlightenment and the federalist beliefs of the Ukrainian academic Mykhailo Drahomanov. Gulabchev came to believe that in order to build a socially just society, populist ideas would have to be spread through a "book" movement in the Balkans; specifically, he focused his attention on the Bulgarian student diaspora, working to establish a network of "readers' friendly societies", which he also called "readers' fellowships" or simply "fellowships". Gulabchev planned to spread such fellowships internationally, covering all countries with a Bulgarian student population, with these fellowships being subordinate to a central fellowship in Kiev. He hoped that these cohesive student groups would produce propaganda when they returned to Bulgaria.

The first of these fellowships, which Gulabchev personally coordinated with students returning to Bulgaria to see family, appeared in Ruse, Silistra, Veliko Tarnovo, Varna, and Anhialo. In practice, these fellowships were generally composed of 5 – 10 members who distributed literature, maintained book collections, wrote magazine/newspaper articles, and translated foreign publications into Bulgarian. Their creation was funded by Gulabchev, after which they were maintained by membership fees (a portion of which went to the central fellowship in Kiev) and donations from wealthy patrons.

The fellowships became more structured as time passed. In 1882 Gulabchev designed a constitution for the network and began to carefully select the members of future fellowships, acting as a secret society similar to Narodnaya Volya. In 1883 he established a student society at Kiev University called the "Friendly Society for the Promotion of Bulgarianness in Macedonia".

== Return to Bulgaria and the siromakhomilstvo movement ==
By 1884 Gulabchev had become known to the Special Corps of Gendarmes and was, according to state documents, interrogated as a witness "due to a close acquaintance with a person who is extremely unreliable in political terms". He nevertheless continued his political activities; on 5 February 1886, while disembarking the Russian ship Azov in Constantinople, Gulabchev was found by Russian Empire customs to be smuggling 37 publications that were considered "revolutionary" in nature. Officials imprisoned him in Odessa. Throughout interrogations he refused to reveal suppliers or transportation chains, maintaining that he had bought the literature cheaply in Sofia for personal use. He was soon after expelled from Kiev University, but the state prosecutor was hesitant to bring a foreign citizen to trial.

The case began to appear in Bulgarian newspapers, with articles stating that the Bulgarian student was under threat of being exiled to Siberia; following intervention by the Bulgarian Exarchate and government it was eventually decided to instead deport Gulabchev to Bulgaria. By mid to late 1886 he had been released.

Undeterred, he continued to be active in politics. He began teaching at Gabrovo School in January 1887, where he found himself in a socialist environment. Here, he organized a secret circle which eventually culminated in an 1888 student revolt; Gulabchev planned that the students would distribute a propaganda pamphlet after it was quelled, but this never materialized. He was afterwards transferred to First Boy's Public School in Varna, where he had established the "Kapka" educational society the year before. By 1889 he was teaching in Veliko Tarnovo.

While he taught, Gulabchev continued to develop the political ideas he had been influenced by in Russia. His "readers' fellowships" continued to appear throughout Bulgarian cities and began attempts to build a more cohesive ideology; Gulabchev grew a movement, the siromakhomilstvo, around the belief that the poorest (siromasi) ought to be protected and shown love and mercy – contemporary Bulgarian histiography described the movement as a populist and Russian nihilist movement. The siromakhomilstvo condemned social inequalities and actively advocated for revolutionary action among the poor through events organised in clubs and libraries. Like many similar movements throughout the period, Gulabchev decried luxury, fashion, and other aesthetic focuses on the grounds that they were an affront to the poor. For similar reasons, he criticized government spending on higher education while the majority didn't have access to secondary education, but also emphasised the importance of solidarity between the intelligentsia and the impoverished. He employed populist techniques to demonstrate this solidarity, such as forbidding his immediate followers from wearing ties, which he felt were a symbol of alienation between the intellectual class and the common people.

Siromakhomilstvo groups communicated through ciphers after 1891, which had become popular among socialist organisations.

Gulabchev's image of an ideal future, which he referred to as 'primitively-communist', struggled to gain significant attention outside of the intelligentsia; by the late 1880s the siromakhomilstvo movement split off into anarchist, state socialist, and Marxist movements, with Gulabchev supporting anarchism.

In 1892 he founded the first anarchist group in Ruse, where members studied the works of Mikhail Bakunin and Peter Kropotkin. In response to a 1909 international anarchist congress, Gulabchev was involved in an unsuccessful campaign to organise anarchist groups in Bulgaria on a national level.
