= Hristo Matov =

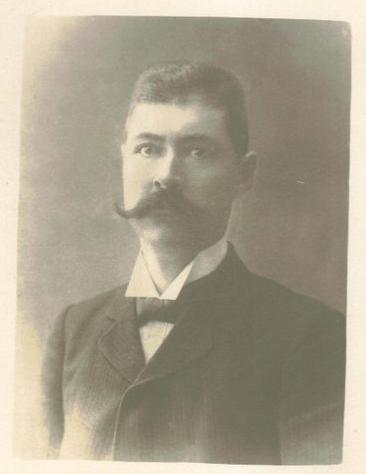
Hristo Matov

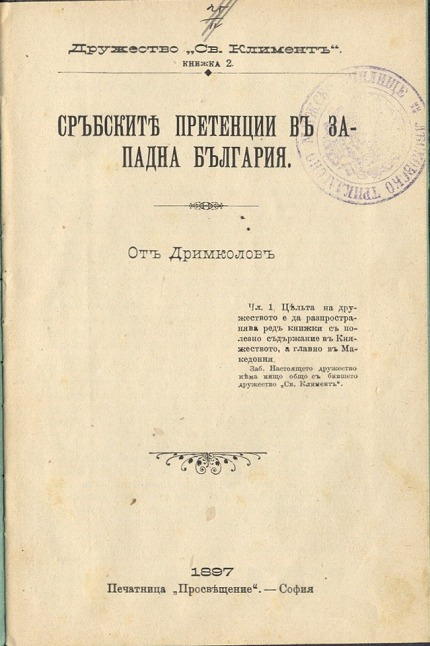
"Serbian Claims on Western Bulgaria" is a pamphlet published in 1897 in Sofia in Bulgarian by Hristo Matov. In it, Matov proves the Bulgarianness of the Slavic population in Macedonia and rejects as untenable the claims that it is Serbian.

Hristo Apostolov Matov (Bulgarian: Христо Апостолов Матов, also spelled Christo Matoff) (10 March 1872 – 10 February 1922) was a prominent Macedonian Bulgarian revolutionary, philologist, folklorist and publicist and one of the leaders of the Bulgarian Macedonian-Adrianople Revolutionary Committees, (later SMORO, IMORO, IMRO).

Matov was born in 1872 in Struga, Ottoman Empire (today part of the Republic of North Macedonia). Upon receiving his education in the Bulgarian school in Salonica, he chose a career as a teacher.

In 1895, while in Salonica, Matov was initiated into the Internal Macedonian Revolutionary Organization (IMRO) by Damyan Gruev. His education warranted his subsequent appointment as a director of the Bulgarian pedagogical school of Skopje. In less than a year as head of the school, he succeeded in organizing many revolutionary committees. In 1898 he was elected as member of the Central Committee in Salonica.

In 1901, when the Salonica outrage occurred and the Ottoman authorities arrested many IMRO activists, he was imprisoned there and later exiled to Bodrum, Asia Minor. In 1902, as a result of a general amnesty, he was released and allowed to return to Thessaloniki. Soon after, he went to Sofia as a representative of the Central Committee of the IMRO.

The failure of the Ilinden Uprising in 1903 reignited the rivalries between the varying factions of the Macedonian revolutionary movement. The left-wing faction opposed Bulgarian nationalism but the Centralist's faction of the IMARO, drifted more and more towards it. At that time Matov became one of the leaders of the Centralist faction. He escaped assassination in 1907, when Boris Sarafov and Ivan Garvanov were killed by the leftist Todor Panitsa. Afterwards, he participated in the Balkan Wars and in the First World War as a Bulgarian officer.

Matov was acknowledged as a constitutionalist of the Macedonian movement. He is the author of several books, a number of pamphlets, and several poems while in prison.

He died in Sofia on 10 February 1922.

== Honours ==
Matov Peak in Graham Land, Antarctica is named after Hristo Matov.

== See also ==
- Internal Macedonian Revolutionary Organisation (IMRO)
