= Strandzha Commune =

Commune in Adrianople, Ottoman Empire

Coordinates: 42°10′15″N 27°51′05″E

Strandzha Commune Странджанска комуна
- 1903
- Flag
- Motto: Свобода или смърт Svoboda ili smart ("Freedom or Death")
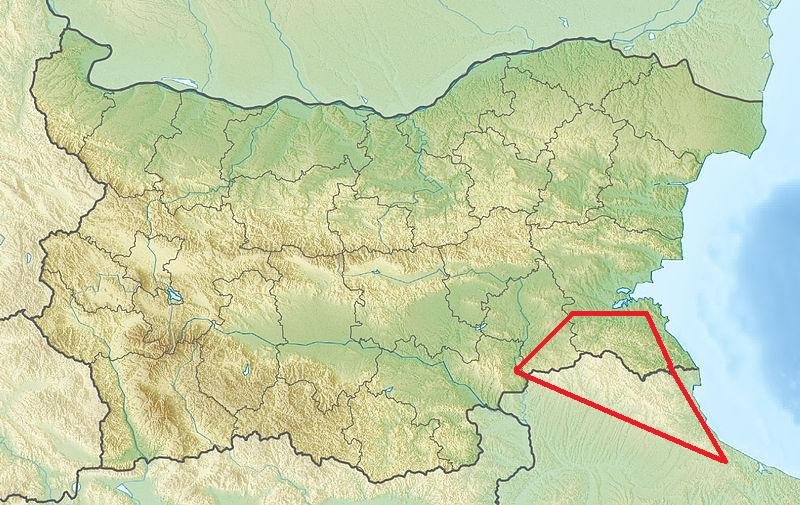
- Location in modern-day Bulgaria and Turkey.
- Status: Stateless society
- Capital: Vasiliko
- Common languages: Bulgarian
- Demonym: Thracian
- Government: Anarchist communism
- Commander-in-chief (de facto)
  - 1903: Mihail Gerdzhikov
- Historical era: Ilinden–Preobrazhenie Uprising
  - Established: 19 August 1903
  - Disestablished: 7 September 1903
Preceded by	Succeeded by
Ottoman Empire	Ottoman Empire
- Today part of: Bulgaria; Turkey

The Strandzha Commune (Bulgarian: Странджанска комуна, romanized: Strandzhanska komuna), also known as the Strandzha Republic (Bulgarian: Странджанска република, romanized: Strandzhanska republika), was a short-lived anarchist commune in East Thrace. It was proclaimed during the Preobrazhenie Uprising in 1903 by rebels of the Internal Macedonian Adrianople Revolutionary Organization (IMARO), in the Adrianople vilayet of the Ottoman Empire.

The independence of the Principality of Bulgaria and subsequent separation of Thrace and Macedonia from its territory had ignited a irredentist movement, organised around the IMARO. The organisation, which counted Bulgarian anarchists among its membership, planned for the liberation of Thrace and Macedonia from Ottoman rule and the establishment of a socialist order in the Balkans. In 1903, they began laying plans for an uprising against the Ottomans and the anarchist Mihail Gerdzhikov was selected to prepare an insurrection in Thrace.

In the mountains of Strandzha, IMARO insurgents began preparations for their uprising and the local Thracian peasantry began spontaneously establishing a libertarian communist system in the region. Once the uprising was initiated and insurgents captured much of the region, the Strandzha Commune was proclaimed, definitively establishing communism in the areas liberated from Ottoman control. The Commune would last about a month before its suppression by the Ottoman Empire, during which thousands were killed or became refugees.

Gerdzhikov and the IMARO attempted to elicit international support for the national liberation struggles in Macedonia and Thrace, but were ultimately unsuccessful. East Thrace remained under the control of the Ottoman Empire and is today still controlled by Turkey. The Strandzha Commune left a lasting legacy as the first distinctively modern attempt to establish libertarian communism, inspiring the consolidation of the Bulgarian anarchist movement and preceding the uprising of the Makhnovshchina in Ukraine.

== Background ==
East Thrace was first brought under the control of the Ottoman Empire in the 14th century, during which it crushed the Bulgarian Empire and subjugated it to Ottoman rule. The reaction against the occupation of Bulgaria culminated in the 19th century with the Bulgarian National Awakening, as Bulgarians increasingly rose up against Ottoman rule. Bulgarian anarchists of the period believed that the national liberation struggle could be the means through which to achieve libertarian communism. The anarchist Hristo Botev even participated in the failed April Uprising of 1876, losing his life in the process. In total, 60 Bulgarian anarchists lost their lives during the national liberation struggle.

Following the victory of the Russian Empire over the Ottoman Empire in the Russo-Turkish War of 1877–1878, the Treaty of San Stefano secured the establishment of the independent Principality of Bulgaria, although the revised Treaty of Berlin left it without many of its promised territories. The region of Adrianople, of which a third of the population was Bulgarian, remained under the control of the Ottomans and outside of the new Bulgarian state.

Bulgarian refugees subsequently fled Adrianople to Bulgaria, where in 1893 they ignited a movement for Bulgarian irredentism, organizing themselves into the Internal Macedonian-Adrianople Revolutionary Organization (IMARO). They established a network of chetas, revolutionary cells which were to prepare for a popular uprising against the Ottomans in the occupied territories. In 1898, the Bulgarian anarchists of the Macedonian Secret Revolutionary Committee (MTRK), including Mihail Gerdzhikov, joined the IMARO and began participating in its revolutionary activities. In January 1903, the leadership of the IMARO initiated their plans for a mass insurrection in Bitola and Adrianople, with an underground congress of the IMARO electing Gerdzhikov to lead the Adrianople revolutionary district.

== History ==
=== Preparations ===
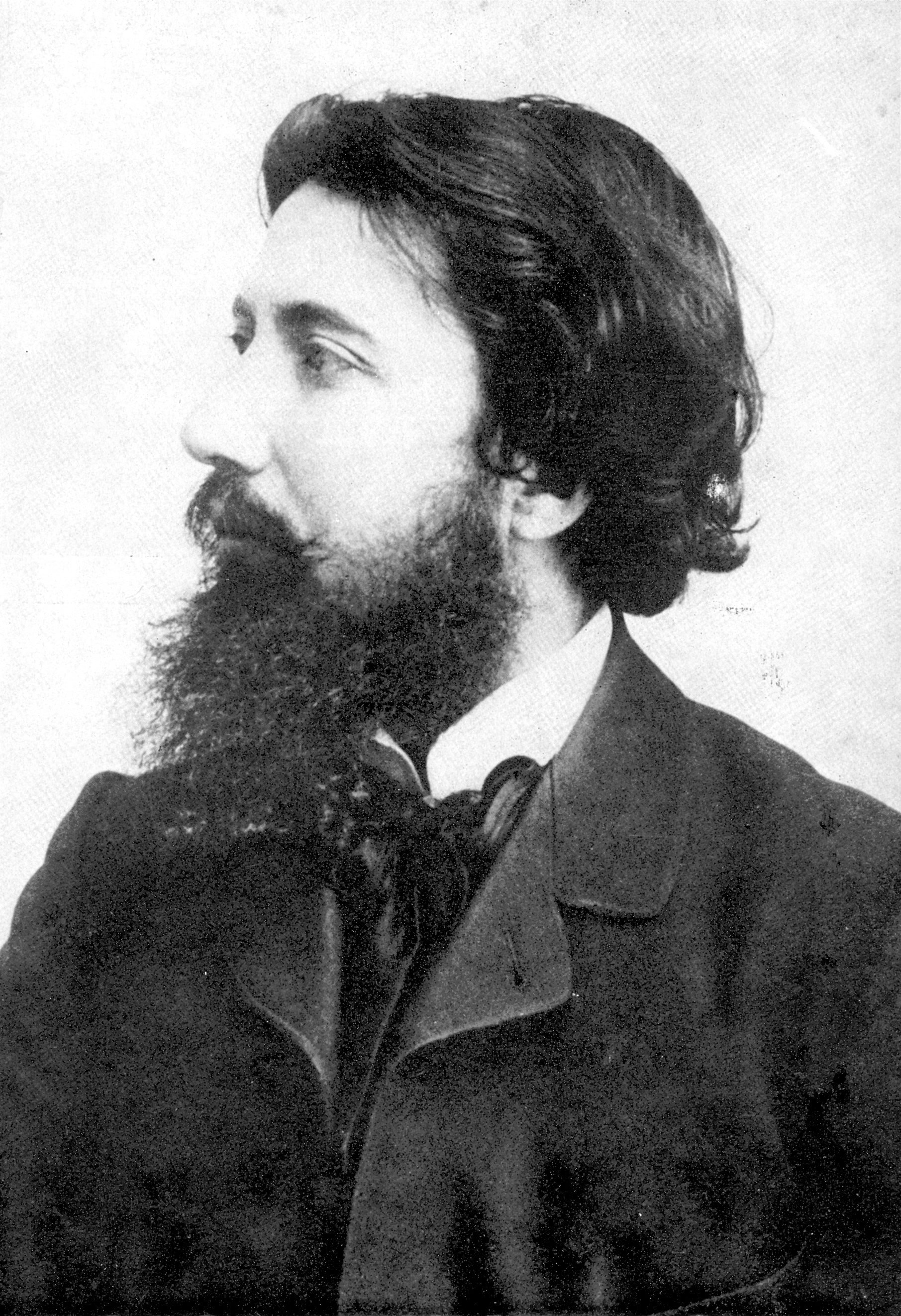
Mihail Gerdzhikov, de facto commander-in-chief of the Preobrazhenie Uprising

In early 1903, throughout the mountains of Strandzha, people began preparing for the coming uprising. Led by the anarchist Mihail Gerdzhikov, revolutionaries started procuring weapons, manufacturing bombs and sabotaging Ottoman lines. Gerdzhikov also tended to the establishment of "death squads", which were to form the nucleus of the Thracian revolutionary army.

The villagers of Strandzha also spontaneously established libertarian communism. Thracian villages reorganized into communes, bringing land, livestock and agricultural produce under common ownership. While men formed local militias and began training for the coming uprising, women, children and the elderly worked cooperatively in the fields. Although the system wasn't welcomed by everyone, with some rich landowners protesting, it was established without coercion or significant resistance.

In the rebel strongholds of Malko Tarnovo, Lozengrad and Bunarhisar, the uprising grew into a mass movement, with people of all ages and genders helping to prepare the insurrection. Women harvested crops for the movement's food supply, stashed weapons for fighters and acted as liaisons for the militias, even designing and manufacturing flags for the uprising. On 2 April [O.S. 20 March] 1903, Ottoman forces surrounded Pano Angelov's militia at Brashlyan and killed them in battle, leaving their bodies behind unburied. Rebels brought their bodies back to a revolutionary funeral at Malko Tarnovo, where villagers dedicated songs to the fallen fighters.

=== Uprising ===
On 11 July [O.S. 28 June] 1903, a congress at Petrova Niva declared that the uprising would begin on 23 July [O.S. 10 July] 1903. But Gerdzhikov successfully requested its postponement to the following week, as the Adrianpolitan revolutionaries were not yet ready to carry out their own uprising, which was planned to hinder the transfer of the Ottoman Army to Macedonia. On 2 August [O.S. 20 July] 1903, (Note: The Feast Day of Saint Elijah) the Ilinden Uprising finally broke out in Macedonia, where the revolutionaries established the Kruševo Republic. The uprising caught Gerdzhikov in Bulgaria, where he had sent Mikhail Daev to recruit more militiamen from Varna. Gerdzhikov quickly returned to Ottoman Thrace and, on 10 August [O.S. 28 July] 1903, rendezvoued with other members of the Adrianopolitan revolutionary leadership – Stamat Ikonomov, Lazar Madzharov and Hristo Silyanov – in the village of Golyamo Kokorafi. They agreed to initiate their uprising on the following week, with each commander having the autonomy to carry out decentralized and independent action against the Ottoman forces. Each tasked with targeting military outposts and infrastructure, Gerdzhikov chose to attack the Ottoman barracks at the port town of Vasiliko, while Ikonomov was dispatched to attack the garrison at Uzunköy and Madzharov to the garrison at Derinköy. Ikonomov had initially proposed that they begin by attacking Malko Tarnovo, but his plan was opposed by the others due to lack of information on the local garrison's numbers. It would later be discovered that the town's garrison was insignificant, and that the town could feasibly have been taken per Ikonomov's proposals.

The revolutionary army consisted of about 2,000 poorly equipped men, only 200 of whom were armed with quality Mannlicher rifles, while the rest had to make do with old rifles that had last been used half a century earlier in the Crimean War. The rebels were also vastly outnumbered by Ottoman forces, themselves equipped with modern Mauser rifles. The rebels also drew their base of support from the Bulgarian peasantry, many of whom were untrained. The revolutionaries also attempted to appeal to other ethnic groups, with the revolutionary command declaring that they were only fighting against the tyranny of the Ottomans, rather than for any ethnic nationalist motivations, and thus expressing solidarity with ordinary Turks that were also ruled by the empire.

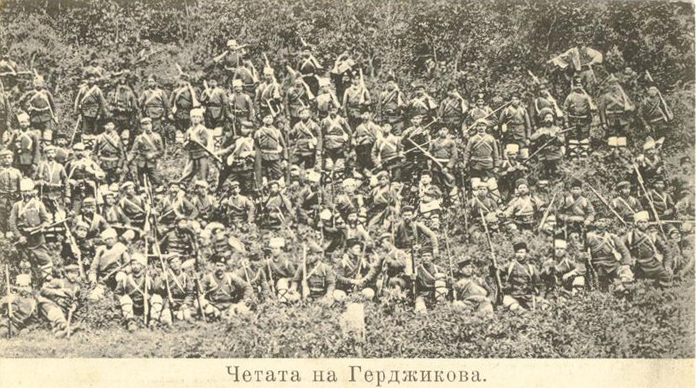
Gerdzhikov's cheta, during the Preobrazhenie Uprising

Coordination of the beginning of the uprising was initially hindered by Konstantin Antonov, who was supposed to carry out acts of sabotage along with the anarchist demolitions expert Konstantin Nunkov, but continually failed to achieve his objectives. The revolutionary leadership demanded he abdicate command to Nunkov, but he didn't answer, and by the time that the uprising started, increased Ottoman security provisions left him unable to carry out any further actions. As the date of the uprising approached, events began to unfold that the rebels had not anticipated: on 16 August [O.S. 3 August] 1903, revolutionaries in Risovo arrested and executed a tax collector, civil guards and a Greek spy; and on 17 August [O.S. 4 August] 1903, rebels surrounded Madzhur and attacked a detachment of 30 soldiers that were evicting the local population, killing 20. This prompted Gerdzhikov, who had gathered with 120 militiamen in the area of Kladar, to declare the start of the uprising:

"The hour has finally come [...] the hour we have been waiting for for five hundred years, which we have been working for day and night, buying up rifles, roaming the Balkans, populating the dungeons... This evening all our brothers in blood and suffering, wherever they may be, shall pit their strength against our enemies. Wherever there are Turkish forces we shall smash them. Tonight terrible deeds must be done. Blood shall flow, heads shall roll, villages and towns shall burn. As of tonight we are no longer the oppressed infidel subjects. We do not respect the Muslim laws, the viziers, the army, we shall pay no taxes and duties. Now it is us who shall set the laws, elect the judges and control the army in these lands! Every Turk shall be greeted not with the customary Muslim greeting but with knife and bullet until our land is purged of the enemy, or until they submit to our way and begin to live a new life, no longer as overlords and oppressors, but as peace-loving Thracians with equal rights and responsibilities. Those of you here who feel fear in your hearts should leave now while there is still time, because when we set off from here there is no going back! We are not fighting for ourselves but for our wives and children, for the generations to come!"

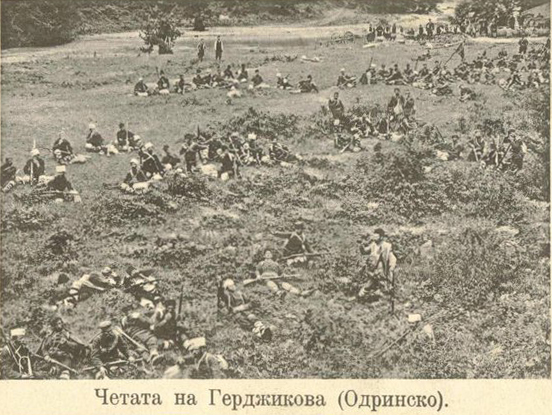
Gerdzhikov's cheta, during the Preobrazhenie Uprising

On 19 August [O.S. 6 August] 1903, (Note: The Feast of the Transfiguration) the Adrianopolitan revolutionaries ignited the Preobrazhenie Uprising. At 01:30, Gerdzhikov's militia marched on Vasiliko, where they surrounded the government offices and Turkish quarter, positioned themselves on the roads through town and cut its telegraph lines. Gerdzhkiov led a detachment of 40 rebels, only 15 of whom were trained militiamen, in attacking the Ottoman garrisons, which together contained 800 troops. Most of the soldiers and Turkish civilians fled the town by boat, but Hristo Silyanov managed to capture the town's highest-ranking officials, including the naval officer, postmaster general, head of the harbour and chief of police. Gerdzhikov explained their motivations for the attack and offered the officials to either be freed immediately or escorted to safety in Bulgaria, with the officials choosing the latter. Later that morning, the town's Greek population greeted Gerdzhikov with gifts and asked how they were to organise their new administration. He responded by advising that they self-organize however they saw fit, with the Greeks electing a provisional government, itself answerable to the revolutionary command. Gerdzhikov's militia then left the town and went on to other villages, being welcomed as a liberator by the village of Balgari.

Map of the Strandzha mountain range

That same night, local militias in Peneka cut the region's telegraph lines, drove the police out of the village and attacked the nearby army garrison. Ikonomov's militias also set out from Veliko and attacked the garrison at Vizitsa, preventing the local Ottoman forces from intervening against the uprising, even after the rebels withdrew back to Veliko. In Tsiknikhor, the militia led by Stoyan Kamilski attacked the Ottoman garrison, taking the barracks and shooting its commanding officer, before burning down two houses that Ottoman soldiers had barricaded themselves inside. In Gramatikovo, 120 rebels attacked the local Ottoman garrison and forced its 300 soldiers to flee, before heading on to attack Ottoman posts at Poturnak and Vizitsa, while the local militia destroyed Gramatikovo's telegraph posts and the bridge over the Veleka. In Stoilovo, 250 rebels attacked and destroyed the local Ottoman garrison, briefly being forced to withdraw after reinforcements arrived by Malko Tarnovo, before the Ottomans abandoned the village and the rebels captured it. In Zvezdets, the Ottoman barracks were set on fire and its soldiers fled, with reinforcements from Malko Tarnovo later being surrounded by the entrenched rebels, forcing them to flee back where they came. The rebels then captured Surmashik and Konak, burning down the barracks and border posts in the area. In Derekovo, Lazar Madzharov led 300 rebels, armed mostly with axes and clubs, in an attack on the local garrison, taking the town and cutting its telegraph lines. Part of his forces then prematurely attacked Kadiyevo, forcing Madzharov to order them to withdraw. The following day, Ottoman reinforcements arrived from Lozengrad and the 1,000 rebels in the region decided to regroup at their camp, but as they were poorly armed, they were forced to withdraw from the region entirely. In Paspalovo, rebels led by Georgi Kondolov launched an attack against the reinforced local garrison, during which Kondolov himself was gravely wounded. He requested his soldiers kill him and he was buried in the local cemetery, where the district's residents paid their respects to the fallen commander.

On 21 August [O.S. 8 August] 1903, the start of the uprising was officially signalled when rebels blew up the lighthouse in İğneada, upon which 80 Ottoman soldiers immediately fled Kosti, while the rebels captured Ahtopol and oversaw the election of a provisional government there. The following night, rebels attacked the garrison at Kalevo, forcing the soldiers to flee to Malko Tarnovo, leaving their storehouses to the rebels. By 23 August [O.S. 10 August] 1903, the entire region was under rebel control. All of the immediate tasks of the uprising were largely fulfilled, hampering the transfer of Ottoman troops to Macedonia, disrupting their communications network and besieging the district's last garrison holding out in Malko Tarnovo. After initial operations went well, Gerdzhikov contacted his fellow commanders in order to attempt a coordinated attack against Malko Tarnovo, but found them preoccupied with their own fronts. Over the course of the uprising, there were 40 clashes between rebel and Ottoman forces, resulting in the deaths of 314 Ottoman soldiers and 38 rebels.

=== Communal life ===
The revolutionaries succeeded in capturing large parts of East Thrace, encompassing 92 Greek and Bulgarian villages that consisted of over 17,000 houses in total. Here they established the Strandzha Commune, a society designed according to the principles of libertarian communism. The Commune has been referred to alternatively as a "republic" or a "mini-state", itself founded on a communitarian system which upheld freedom, equality and solidarity. Ethnic conflicts between Greeks and Bulgarians receded, as they arrived at decisions through mutual agreement, and the old Ottoman tax books were burned.

During this time, Strandzha existed as a stateless society, without anyone attempting to build a state structure, establish a system of authority or issue unilateral decrees. In order to administer their new society, the villages of Strandzha elected commissions, each answerable to their local militias, who as an armed force were responsible for the protection of the Commune. The rebels opted against using the term "General Staff" due to its militarist connotations, the leadership of the Commune was called the "Leading Combat Body", established to temporarily act as the executive power and coordinate military operations until the end of the conflict. There were also disagreements within the anarchist leadership over organisational questions: the "Boatmen", such as Slavi Merdzhanov, Petar Mandzhukov and Petar Sokolov, wished to remain operationally separate from the IMARO; the independent anarchists Nikola Dechev, Varban Kilifarski and Konstantin Nunkov also supported organisational autonomy; but their commander-in-chief Mihail Gerdzhikov warned against engaging in small-scale partisan activity and advocated full participation within the IMARO, in order to coordinate their revolutionary activities at scale.

Although led by anarchists, the reach of anarchist propaganda was limited and the new society was constructed largely spontaneously. The villagers of Strandzha, who had already established a communal economy in four villages while preparing for the uprising, were quick to adopt communism and abolish private property, bringing land and livestock under common ownership. Once food was harvested, it was collected into a common storehouse and appropriate shares portioned out to villagers and fighters. Communism proved particularly enticing to the poor residents of the region, who had little to lose from the new system and whose lot improved once they were no longer subject to the whims of their landlords. Participants in the uprising often noted a specific example of communism in action: when 200,000 kg of salt was discovered in a state-owned cellar in Ahtopol, Gerdzhikov and Petar Angelov dissolved the state company and distributed the salt throughout the villages of Strandzha, giving four measures of salt to each family and a dozen cart-loads for each village.

Hristo Silyanov wrote of the uprising that "I have seen areas in Macedonia much better prepared for uprising than here in the Malko Turnovo area, but here for the first time I have seen the Commune..." Gerdzhikov himself wrote of the experience:

"We somehow began setting up our own institutions... The population was rejoicing, in the villages people danced and held feasts. There was no more "This is mine and that is yours" – in the hills and forests before and after the congress we had set up storehouses: the whole harvest was deposited there as flour and grain in common stores. The livestock also became common property... We issued an appeal to the ethnic Greek population in Greek explaining that in taking over territory we weren't fighting for the re-establishment of a Bulgarian empire, but only for human rights; we explained to them that as Greeks they too would benefit from this and it would be good if they would support us morally and materially..."

The region's libertarian communist system lasted until 3 September [O.S. 21 August] 1903, with some parts of the region holding out for another week, before being broken up by the Ottoman army. In total, the Strandzha Commune lasted barely a month.

=== Repression and aftermath ===
On 7 September [O.S. 25 August] 1903, 40,000 Ottoman troops conducted a counter-offensive against the Strandzha commune, methodically encircling rebel territories before attacking and often strategically withdrawing to avoid pitched battles with the rebels. Gerdzhikov's forces attempted to attack the Ottoman army as much as possible, in order to provide time and space for the civilian population to flee. They evacuated whole villages towards Bulgaria, where they hoped that they would find military assistance from the Bulgarian state, but such an intervention never took place. During the Ottoman advance, 2,565 people were killed, 12,880 were left homeless and 20,000 became refugees. The number of victims in East Thrace was comparatively higher than Macedonia, as the autocratic Sultan Abdul Hamid II did not want to tolerate an uprising so close to Istanbul. In the end, the poorly armed, poorly trained and numerically inferior rebel forces were unable to withstand the Ottoman assault.

Within two months, the Ilinden–Preobrazhenie Uprising had been suppressed, leaving thousands of victims throughout Macedonia and Thrace. The ensuing repression encouraged the Bulgarian national liberation movement to divert funds towards aiding refugees fleeing the two regions, while holding mass demonstrations throughout Bulgaria. The Bulgarian government itself officially condemned the repression, but did little else to intervene, fearing further conflict. The great powers of Europe were similarly passive, allowing the Ottomans to continue the repression unabated.

In October 1903, the Leading Combat Body of the commune regrouped in Sofia in order to survey the outcome of the uprising. The leadership emerged divided: the left-wing was led by Mihail Gerdzhikov and Yane Sandanski, the latter of whom criticised the timing of the uprising as premature; the right-wing was led by Boris Sarafov, who desired to go abroad and solicit financial and diplomatic aid for Macedonia and Thrace. Gerdzhikov eventually agreed to go abroad with Sarafov, on the condition that any decision must be made by agreement of both. The two went to Belgrade and then to Vienna, where Gerdzhikov caught Sarafov holding secret meetings with the nobility and accused him of being an agent of the Bulgarian prince. They then went on to Paris and London, where Gerdzhikov became increasingly frustrated by their fundraising activities. One evening he met with a Japanese diplomat, who expressed sympathy for the Macedonian people and pledged his support in terms of financial aid and the supply of arms. Gerdzhikov initially refused, as he had to consult with Sarafov first, but wondered what the diplomat's motivations were for supporting Macedonia. He later discovered following the outbreak of the Russo-Japanese War that Japan aimed to bog down Russia by re-igniting conflict in the Balkans. They then went on to Italy, where they were mocked by the Italian socialist press for staying in expensive hotels, to which Gerdzhikov found himself agreeing. This irreparably damaged relations between Gerdzhikov and Sarafov, with Gerdzhikov ultimately deciding to withdraw back to Bulgaria, having not raised any money at all.

== Legacy ==
A decade after the Ilinden–Preobrazhenie Uprising, the Balkan Wars resulted in the cession of territory to the nascent Kingdom of Bulgaria. But Adrianople itself remained under Ottoman control, forcing most of the remaining Bulgarian population to flee to Bulgaria, while those that remained behind were subjected to Turkification. Despite the efforts of the IMARO, the region of East Thrace would remain under Turkish rule up until the modern day.

At the time of the uprising, Mihail Gerdzhikov considered it necessary for anarchists to participate in the Bulgarian national liberation movement, in order to advance libertarian communism. But after the suppression of the uprising, he came to see further participation in the national movement as a waste of time, committing himself fully to anarchist activities. Together with Varban Kilifarski and Paraskev Stoyanov, he published some of the first anarchist newspapers in Bulgaria, giving rise to a specific Bulgarian anarchist movement. Gerdzhikov himself went on to co-found the Bulgarian Anarchist Communist Federation (FAKB), which made anarchism a major force in the country. Gerdzhikov died in 1947, following the establishment of the People's Republic of Bulgaria.

Most written histories of the Ilinden–Preobrazhenie Uprising focus on the events in Macedonia, with relatively little scholarly attention paid to the uprising in Thrace. But the Strandzha commune would leave a lasting legacy within the Bulgarian anarchist movement, as the first attempt in the world to establish a libertarian communist society. In many ways, the Strandzha Commune preceded the structure of the Makhnovshchina, which saw its army as a temporary necessity and left the organization of civil society to popularly elected free soviets.

In 1982, General Kiril Kosev of the Bulgarian People's Army gave a report on the military history of the Balkans, in which he declared that the uprising of the Strandzha Commune represented one of the most "glorious pages in our 13-centuries-old history".

== See also ==
- Revolutionary Catalonia

== Bibliography ==
- Balkanski, Georges (1982). "Histoire du mouvement libertaire en Bulgarie: esquisse" [History of the libertarian movement in Bulgaria: sketch]. Volonté anarchiste (in French). No. 16–17. Fédération Anarchiste. ISSN 0181-4389.
- Bojanev, Vladimir (1991). "Bulgaria: The History of the Bulgarian Anarchist Movement". The Raven. Vol. 4, no. 1. pp. 31–35. ISSN 0951-4066.
- Detrez, Raymond, ed. (2006a) [1997]. "Chronology of Bulgarian History". Historical Dictionary of Bulgaria. Historical Dictionaries of Europe. Vol. 46 (2nd ed.). Scarecrow Press. pp. xxi–xli. ISBN 978-0-8108-4901-3. LCCN 2005034747.
- —, ed. (2006b) [1997]. "Adrianople Region". Historical Dictionary of Bulgaria. Historical Dictionaries of Europe. Vol. 46 (2nd ed.). Scarecrow Press. p. 3. ISBN 978-0-8108-4901-3. LCCN 2005034747.
- —, ed. (2006c) [1997]. "Ilinden–Preobrazhenie Uprising". Historical Dictionary of Bulgaria. Historical Dictionaries of Europe. Vol. 46 (2nd ed.). Scarecrow Press. pp. 216–217. ISBN 978-0-8108-4901-3. LCCN 2005034747.
- Khadzhiev, Georgi (1992) [1982]. "The Transfiguration Uprising and the 'Strandzha Commune': The First Libertarian Commune in Bulgaria". Националното освобождение и безвластният федерализъм [National Liberation and Libertarian Federalism] (in Bulgarian). Translated by Firth, Will. Sofia: Artizdat-5. pp. 99–148. OCLC 27030696.
- Kosev, Kiril (24 November 1982). "General Kosev Speaks on Balkan War History" (PDF). East Europe Report: Political, Sociological and Military Affairs (2079). Foreign Broadcast Information Service: 7–18. OCLC 828196677.
- van der Walt, Lucien; Schmidt, Michael (2009). "Anarchists and Syndicalists in Anti-imperialist Struggles". Black Flame: The Revolutionary Class Politics of Anarchism and Syndicalism. Edinburgh: AK Press. pp. 314–321. ISBN 978-1-904859-16-1. LCCN 2006933558. OCLC 1100238201.
