= Macedonian–Thracian revolutionary movement =

Late 19th–early 20th century movement

The Macedonian–Thracian revolutionary movement refers to the organized Bulgarian national-revolutionary activity in the regions of Macedonia and Thrace under Ottoman rule between the 1890s and the Balkan Wars. It is most closely associated with the Internal Macedonian-Adrianople Revolutionary Organization (IMARO), which coordinated guerrilla warfare, clandestine networks, local committees, cross-border logistics, and the 1903 Ilinden–Preobrazhenie Uprising.

Historically, the movement is documented in archival collections, memoir literature, and official IMARO correspondence preserved in Bulgarian state archives and cultural institutions.

== Historical background ==
During the final decades of the Ottoman Empire, both Macedonia and Thrace were ethnically mixed regions with significant Bulgarian populations. Bulgarian national consciousness and educational networks expanded during the late 19th century, laying the foundation for organized revolutionary activity.

Early revolutionary committees appeared in the 1890s, eventually forming a unified organizational system across both regions.

== Formation of IMARO ==
The Internal Macedonian–Adrianople Revolutionary Organization (IMARO) was founded in 1893 in Thessaloniki. It quickly expanded into Thrace (Adrianople Vilayet), creating a dual-regional revolutionary network that included:

- District Committees
- subregional committees
- village revolutionary committees
- armed bands (cheti)
- courier channels (forest posts)
- arms-smuggling routes from Bulgaria

Both Macedonian and Thracian activists served within the same organizational structure until 1908.

== Regional districts ==
IMARO was divided into several major districts, all of which participated in the Macedonian–Thracian revolutionary movement:

- Bitola Revolutionary District
- Salonica Revolutionary District
- Skopje Revolutionary District
- Serres Revolutionary District
- Strumitsa Revolutionary District
- Adrianople Revolutionary District (Thrace)

The Adrianople (Odrin/Edirne) District coordinated Thracian actions and played a leading role in the uprising in Strandzha and Eastern Thrace.

== Activities ==
The Macedonian–Thracian revolutionary movement engaged in:

- creation and training of guerrilla bands
- sabotage actions against Ottoman targets
- self-defense operations in villages
- arms trafficking from Bulgaria
- political agitation and secret schooling
- distribution of propaganda
- operation of border-crossing networks and courier services

Arms, explosives, and printed materials were often smuggled across the Bulgarian–Ottoman border by coordinated “forest posts.”

== Ilinden–Preobrazhenie Uprising (1903) ==
The most significant event of the movement was the 1903 uprising:

- the Macedonian component (Ilinden) broke out on 2 August 1903 in the Bitola and Salonica districts
- the Thracian component (Preobrazhenie) began on 19 August 1903 in Strandzha and the Adrianople District
- the Krushevo Republic and the Strandzha Commune operated briefly as self-governing areas
- Ottoman retaliation resulted in massive destruction and refugee flows

The uprising was widely reported in European diplomatic and journalistic sources.

== Leading figures ==
Notable leaders of the Macedonian–Thracian revolutionary movement include:

- Gotse Delchev – strategist and central ideologue
- Dame Gruev – co-founder and organizer
- Yane Sandanski – leader in Pirin and Serres
- Hristo Tatarchev – founder and chairman of the early Central Committee
- Mihail Gerdzhikov – commander of the Thracian uprising
- Lazar Madzharov – Thracian organizer
- Boris Sarafov – diplomat and organizer
- Efrem Chuchkov – courier and guerrilla commander in Thrace
- Hristo Silyanov – chronicler and historian of the movement

These figures coordinated actions across both Macedonia and Thrace.

== After 1908 ==
Following the Young Turk Revolution, IMARO briefly operated legally and formed the Union of the Bulgarian Constitutional Clubs.

Internal divisions later split the organization, while the Balkan Wars (1912–1913) and subsequent geopolitical changes dissolved the unified Macedonian–Thracian revolutionary structure.

== Legacy ==
The movement left a major imprint on Bulgarian, Macedonian, and regional history. Its legacy is preserved through:

- extensive archival records in Sofia, Plovdiv, Kyustendil, Vratsa
- memoirs of Delchev, Gruev, Silyanov, Madzharov, Gerdzhikov
- museum exhibitions in Sofia, Burgas, Malko Tarnovo, Bitola, and Skopje
- documentary series of the Bulgarian Academy of Sciences
- Western academic studies of the Macedonian Question

Modern scholarship treats the Macedonian–Thracian revolutionary movement as a unified historical phenomenon due to the integrated structure and simultaneous activity of IMARO across both regions.

== See also ==
- Internal Macedonian-Adrianople Revolutionary Organization
- Ilinden–Preobrazhenie Uprising
- Adrianople Revolutionary District
- Macedonian Question
- Eastern Thrace
- Bulgarian revolutionary movement
