= Petrova Niva =

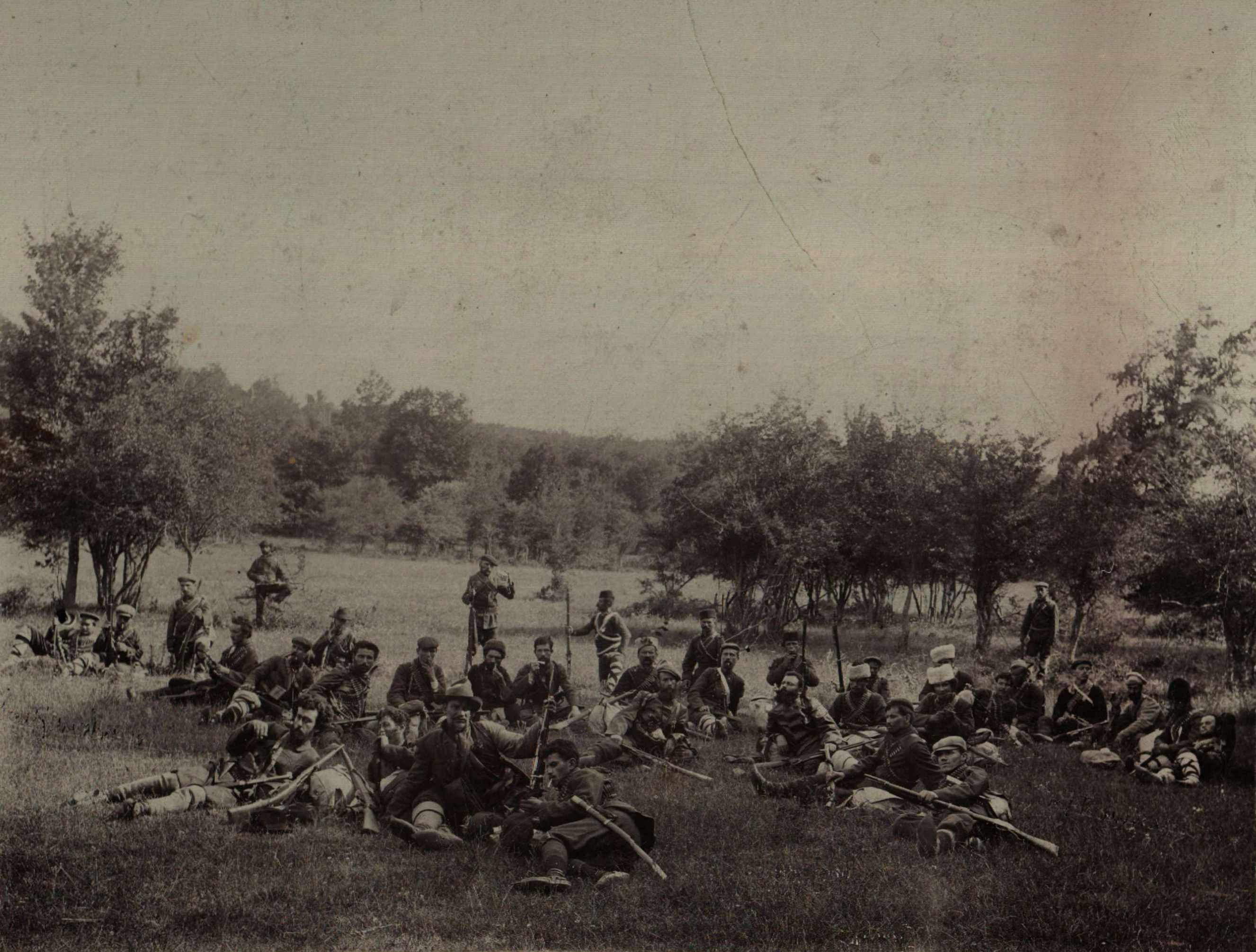
Delegates at the Petrova Niva IMARO congress

Petrova Niva (Bulgarian: Петрова нива, "Peter's field") is a historic area in the Strandzha mountains of southeastern Bulgaria where, between 11 and 13 July 1903, a group of Bulgarian Internal Macedonian-Adrianople Revolutionary Organization (IMARO) delegates announced the outbreak of an anti-Ottoman uprising aimed at liberating southern Thrace from Ottoman rule and proclaimed the Strandzha Republic.

The area lies on the land of the village of Stoilovo in Malko Tarnovo municipality, Burgas Province, within the territory of Strandzha Nature Park. It is among the 100 Tourist Sites of Bulgaria; a monument to the event was built in the 1950s and a church dedicated to Saint Petka was constructed in 2003 for the congress' centennial anniversary, as well as a museum.

The IMARO congress at Petrova Niva was attended by over 300 people, of whom 47 were official delegates. Most of the delegates came from the region of Malko Tarnovo, though the areas of Edirne and Western Thrace were also represented. The congress mostly discussed the very question of whether to organize an uprising, but discussions ceased as the IMARO leadership had already instigated a revolt in the region of Bitola. Despite the lack of enough armaments and the varying preparedness of the local committees, the delegates agreed to aid the insurgents in Macedonia. The rebellions in Macedonia and Thrace are collectively known as the Ilinden–Preobrazhenie Uprising.

== Delegates ==
The 47 delegates at the Petrova Niva IMARO congress were:

Name	Native place	Notes
Mihail Gerdzhikov	Plovdiv	leader of the entire Odrin (Edirne) region east of the Maritsa
Lazar Madzharov	Negovan (Xylopoli, Langadas municipality)	leader of the Lozengrad (Kırklareli) region
Stamat Ikonomov	Malko Tarnovo	Bulgarian Army captain, voivode
Georgi Kondolov	Velika	voivode
Velko Dumev	Voden (Edessa)	leader of the Odrin district committee
Vasil Paskov	Nevrokop (Gotse Delchev)	IMARO Central Committee representative for the Edirne region
Georgi Vassilev (Svilengrad)	Svilengrad	Edirne district committee member
Hristo Silyanov	Istanbul	
Mihail Daev	Balchik	
Nikola Stanchev	Kazanlak	Edirne district committee member
Krastyu Balgariyata	Vratsa	Bulgarian Army sergeant, voivode
Dimitar Katerinski	Svilengrad	Svilengrad district committee leader
Ivan Varnaliev	Veles	
Hristo Karamandzhukov	Chokmanovo	leader of the Smolyan region
Kosta Kalkandzhiev	Varna	
Diko Dzhelebov	Malko Tarnovo	
Anastas Razboynikov	Svilengrad	Bunarhisar (Pınarhisar) district committee leader
Spas Tsvetkov	Evla	
Nikola Kardzhiev	Lozengrad	
Petar Angelov	Haskovo	Bulgarian Army sergeant, voivode
Penyu Shivarov	Chirpan	Bulgarian Army sergeant, voivode
Kiro Dimitrov Uzunov	Malak Samokov (Demirköy)	
Yordan Georgiev	Malko Tarnovo	
Georgi Kostadnev	Malko Tarnovo	
M. Argirov	Malko Tarnovo	
Nestor Ivanov	Odrin	
Ivan Kalchev	Lozengrad	
Dimo Yankov	Malko Tarnovo	
Stoyan Petrov	Malko Tarnovo	
Lefter Mechev	Malko Tarnovo	
Dimitar Halachev	Malko Tarnovo	
Tseno Kurtev	Zlatitsa	Bulgarian Army sergeant, voivode
Petko Zidarov	Tsiknihor by Malko Tarnovo	
Dimitar Tashev	Kolibite by Bunarhisar	
Georgi Kaloyanov	Malko Tarnovo	
Stoyan Kamilski	Kamilite by Malko Tarnovo	
Dimitar Hristakev	Raykovo (Smolyan)	surgeon's assistant at Burgas, doctor during the uprising
Georgi Tenev	Svilengrad	local leader at Lyubimets
Hristo Arnaudov Afuza	Svilengrad	local leader at Chepelare
Lazo Lazov	Lozengrad	
Yani Popov	Karahadar (Karahıdır) by Lozengrad	
Yanko Stoyanov	Malko Tarnovo	
Georgi Todorov Doktora	Kratovo	local leader at Velika
Yani Voynov	Svilengrad	

== Gallery ==
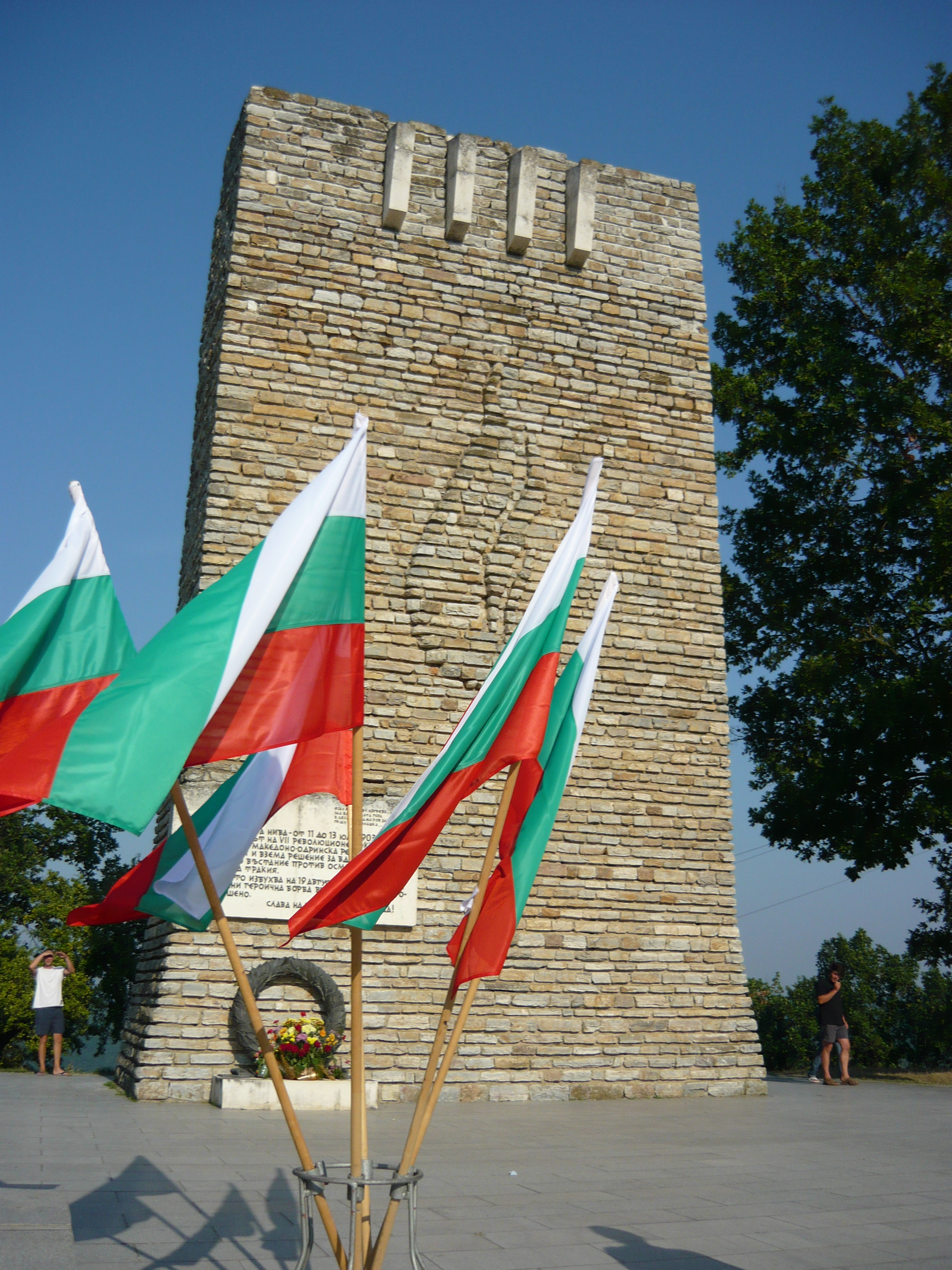
Petrova Niva monument

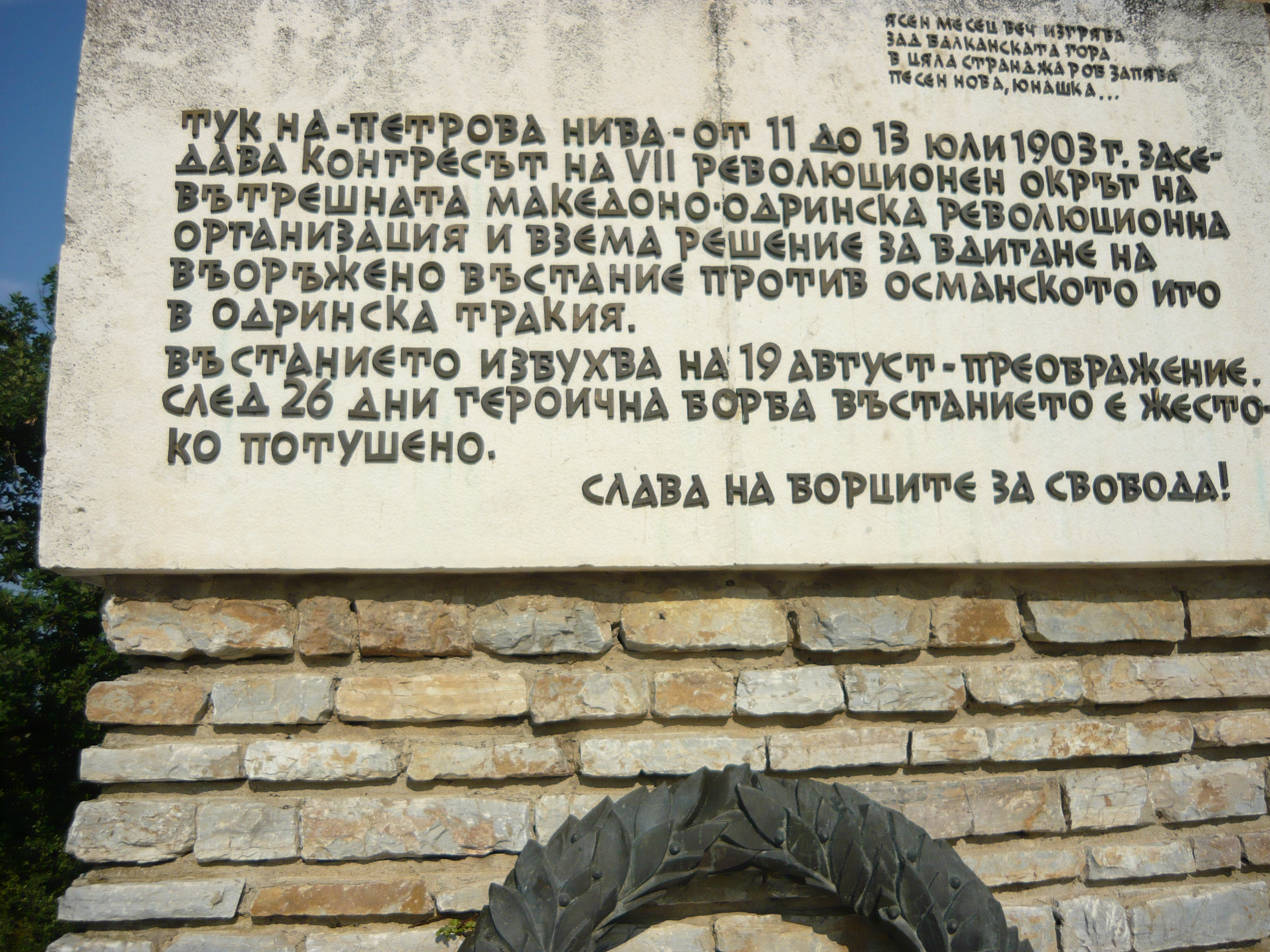
Text on the monument

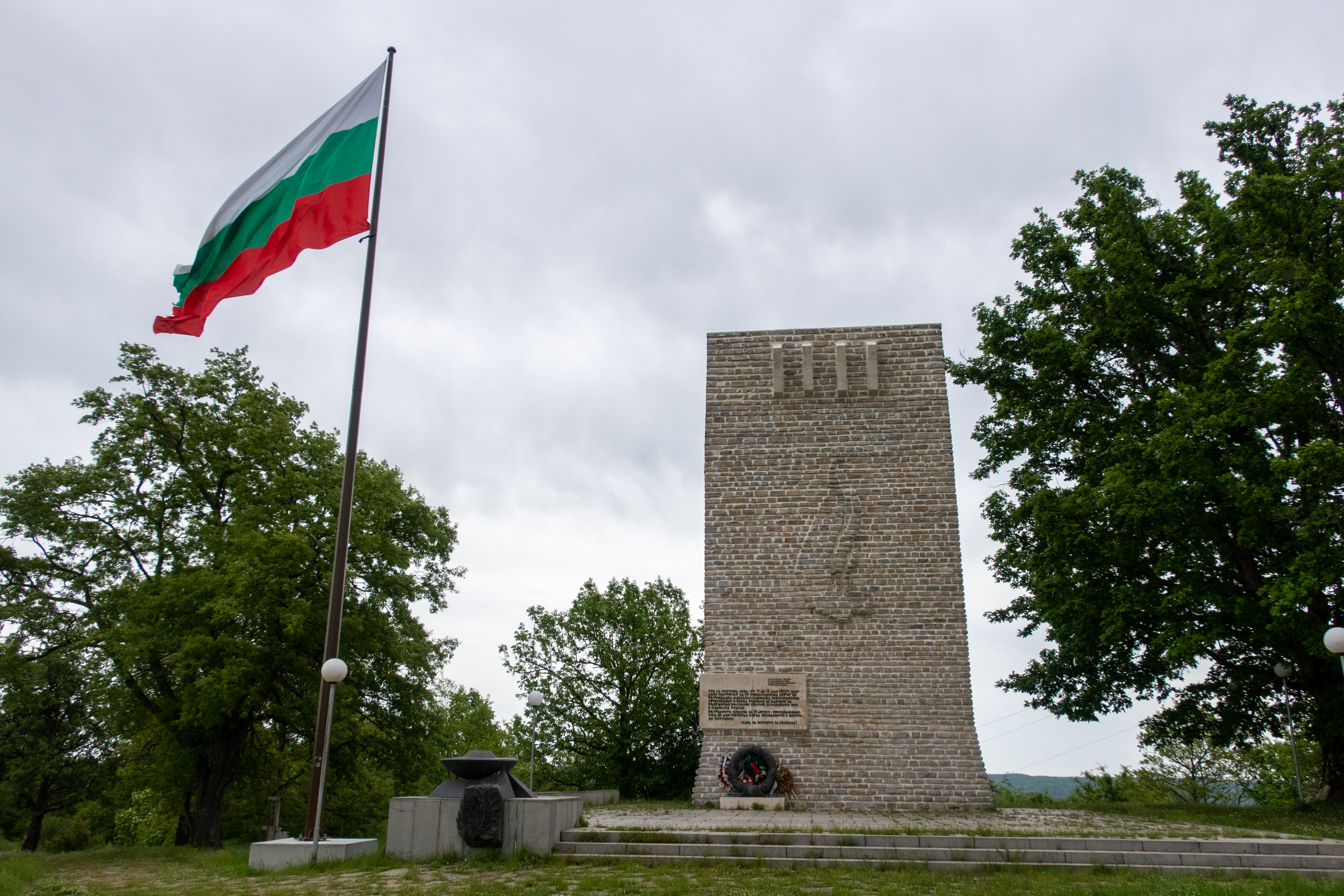
