= Abduramanov =

Abduramanov (Russian: Абдураманов and Abduramanova (feminine: Абдураманова) is a surname of Turkic origin.

People with this surname include:

- Dine Abduramanov, (c.1872–1902) Bulgarian revolutionary
- Seitnebi Abduramanov, (1914–1987) Crimean Tatar full bearer of the Order of Glory
- Uzeir Abduramanov, (1916–1992), Crimean Tatar Hero of the Soviet Union
