= Stefania, Thessaloniki =

Stefania Στεφάνια
- Settlement
- Location within Greece
- Coordinates: 40°55′N 23°2.6′E
- Country: Greece
- Administrative region: Central Macedonia
- Regional unit: Thessaloniki
- Municipality: Langadas
- Municipal unit: Lachanas
- Community: Karteres
- Elevation: 490 m (1,610 ft)

Population (2021)
  - Total: 43
- Time zone: UTC+2 (EET)
  - Summer (DST): UTC+3 (EEST)
- Postal code: 570 17
- Area code: +30-2394
- Vehicle registration: NA to NX

Stefania (Greek: Στεφάνια) is a village of the Langadas municipality. Before the 2011 local government reform it was part of the municipality of Lachanas. The 2021 census recorded 43 inhabitants in the village. Stefania is a part of the community of Karteres.

== See also ==
- List of settlements in the Thessaloniki regional unit
