= Bulgarian Girls' High School of Thessaloniki =

Information
- Established: 1880
- Closed: 1913

The Bulgarian Girls’ High School of Thessaloniki "Sveto Blagoveshtenie" (Annunciation of Our Lady) was founded by the Bulgarian community there. The school had its own building and boarding house, acquired with the help of the Bulgarian benefactor Evlogi Georgiev. The idea of founding a school in Thessaloniki itself belonged to a well-known activist of the Bulgarian national revival Kuzman Shapkarev. The high school was founded in the autumn of 1880 in then Ottoman city of Thessaloniki, where it existed until 1913. The high school was maintained by the Bulgarian Exarchate and the Thessalonikian Bulgarian Municipality. Dimitar Miladinov's daughter, Tsarevna Miladinova, who was working as a teacher in Svishtov at the time, was invited as the first teacher. Kuzman Shapkarev had been appointed a head teacher of both the boys 'and girls' high schools in the city. Teachers from the Thessaloniki Bulgarian Men' High School, taught also there. Until its closure by the new Greek authorities in 1913, the high school prepared 22 outputs with a total of 647 graduates. Subsequently, the girls' school and the Bulgarian Men's High School of Thessaloniki merged into one school. Among the directors of the high school were Georgi Kandilarov, Marin Pundev, Hristo Batandzhiev, Mihail Sarafov (1895 - 1896), Yordan Nikolov (1910 - 1911) etc. The high school taught the same curriculum as the men's high school. After 1913 it moved successively to the towns of Strumica, Shtip, again Strumica, then Petrich. In 1920 it finally was placed in the town of Gorna Dzhumaya (today Blagoevgrad) in Pirin Macedonia, Bulgaria, where it still exists today under the name of the National Humanitarian High School "St. St. Cyril and Methodius".

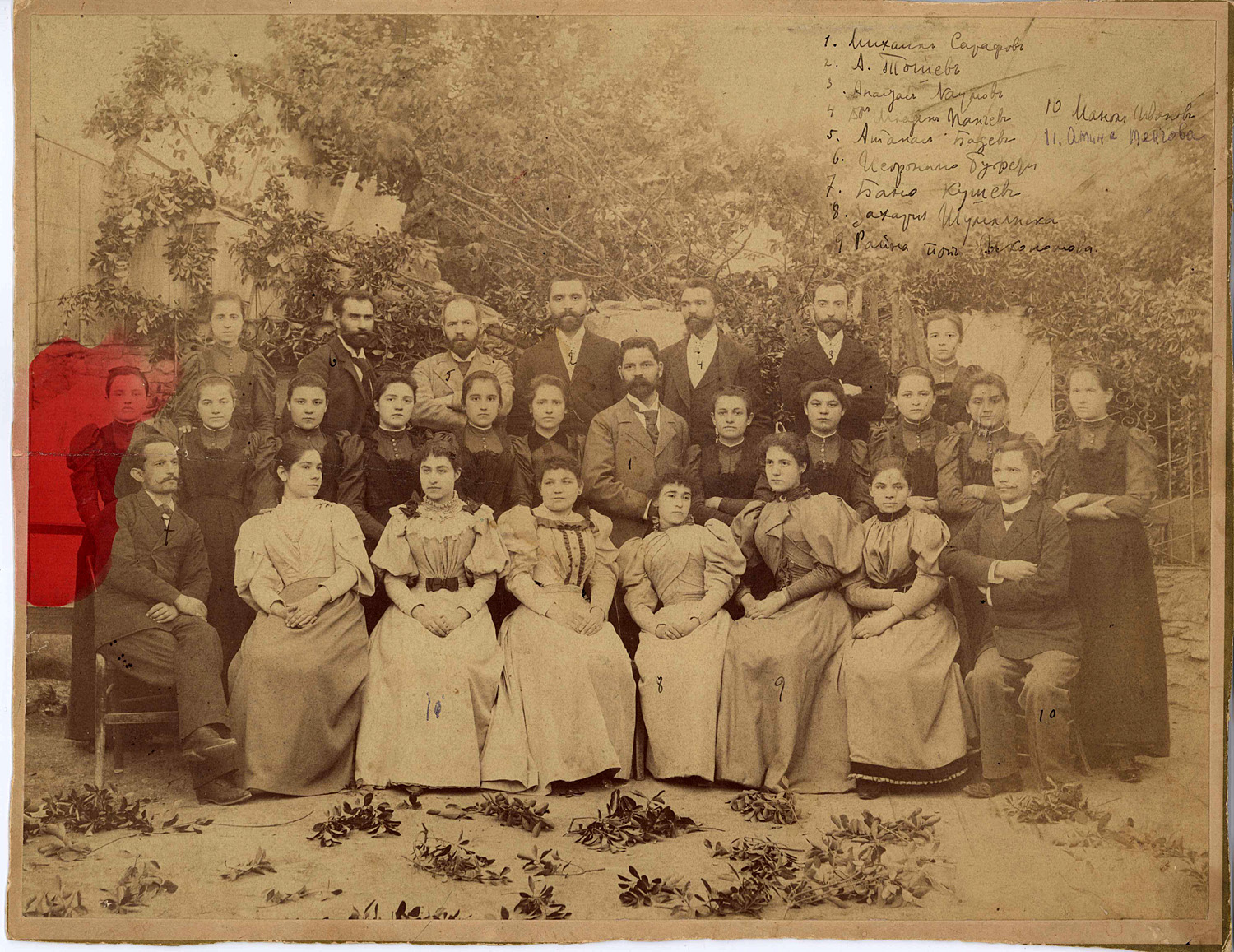
Bulgarian teachers from the Bulgarian High Schools of Thessaloniki.

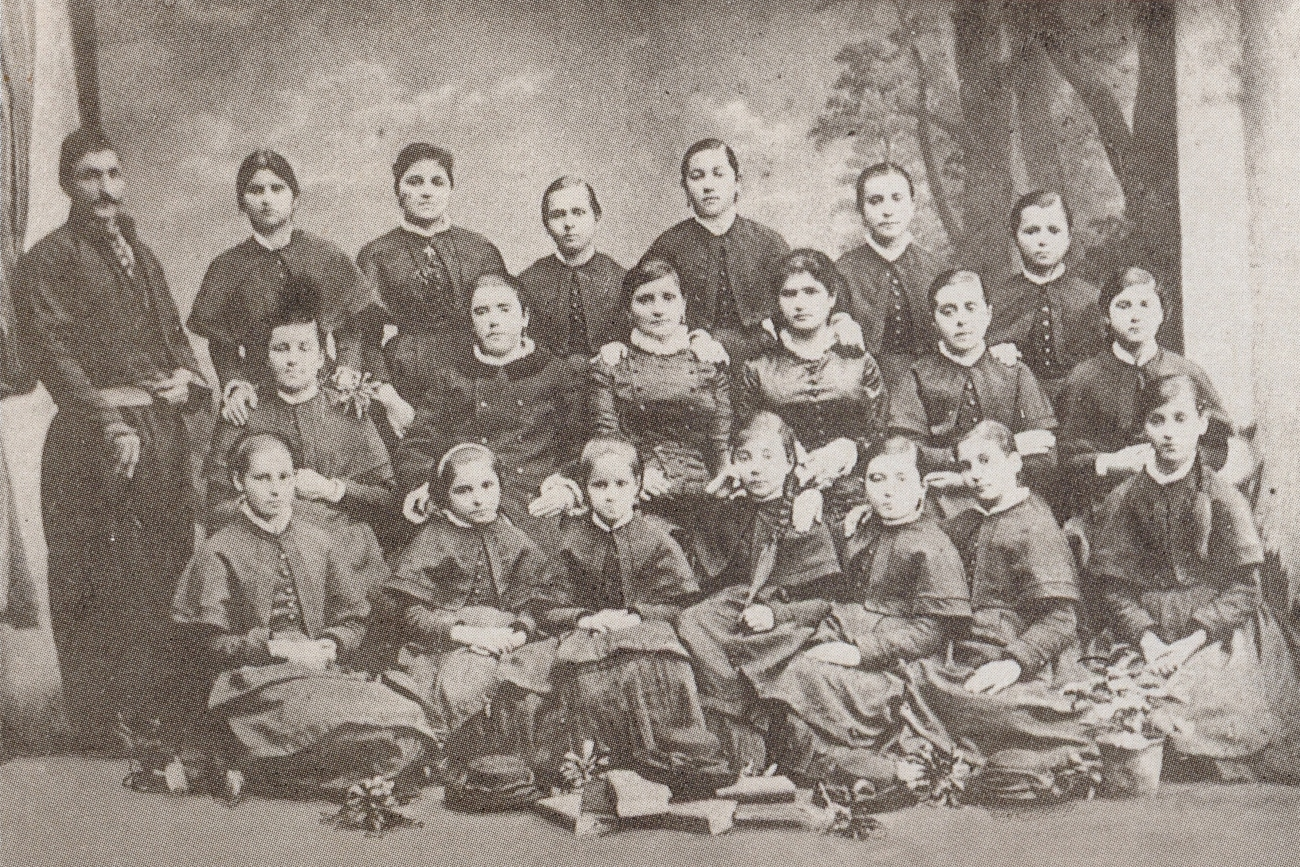
Tsarevna Miladinova, the founder of the first Bulgarian girls' school in Thessaloniki, with teachers and students in the 1882–1883 school year. She is in the middle of the middle row.

== See also ==
- Bulgarian Men's High School of Adrianople
- Education in the Ottoman Empire
- Bulgarian High School of Bolgrad
