= Karteres =

Karteres Καρτερές
- Community
- Location within Greece
- Coordinates: 40°54.55′N 23°4.95′E
- Country: Greece
- Administrative region: Central Macedonia
- Regional unit: Thessaloniki
- Municipality: Lagkadas
- Municipal unit: Lachanas

Area
  - Community: 83.719 km^{2} (32.324 sq mi)
- Elevation: 551 m (1,808 ft)

Population (2021)
  - Community: 549
  - Density: 6.56/km^{2} (17.0/sq mi)
- Time zone: UTC+2 (EET)
  - Summer (DST): UTC+3 (EEST)
- Postal code: 570 17
- Area code: +30-2394
- Vehicle registration: NA to NX

Karteres (Greek: Καρτερές) is a village and a community of the Lagkadas municipality in Greece. Before the 2011 local government reform, it was part of the municipality of Lachanas, of which it was a municipal district. The 2021 census recorded 549 inhabitants in the community of Karteres. The community of Karteres covers an area of 83.719 km.

== Administrative division ==
The community of Karteres consists of four separate settlements:

- Dorkada (population 330 in 2021)
- Karteres (population 156)
- Mavrorrachi (population 20)
- Stefania (population 43)

== See also ==
- List of settlements in the Thessaloniki regional unit
