= Dine Abduramanov =

Bulgarian revolutionary

- Дине Клюсев Абдураманов
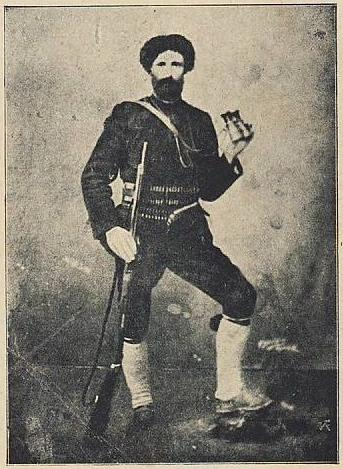
- A photo of Dine Abduramanov
- Born: c. 1872; Patele, Monastir Vilayet, Ottoman Empire (now Agios Panteleimonas, Greece)
- Died: 13 June 1902; Patele, Monastir Vilayet, Ottoman Empire (now Agios Panteleimonas, Greece)
- Military career
- Allegiance: IMRO
- Service years: 1896–1902
- Unit: Cheta of Marko Lerinski
- Conflicts: Macedonian Struggle †

Dine Klyusev Abduramanov (Bulgarian: Дине Клюсев Абдураманов; c. 1872 – 13 June 1902), known as Dine Abduramana, was a Bulgarian revolutionary, a worker of the Internal Macedonian-Adrianople Revolutionary Organization (IMARO).

Dine Abduramanov was born in the village of Patele, Ottoman Empire, today Agios Panteleimonas, Florina regional unit, Greece. He first entered the IMARO in 1896. He was a close friend of Marko Lerinski and a member of his revolutionary band. In June 1902 Marko Lerinski entered the village of Patele in order to punish the traitors of the organization. The band was betrayed and surrounded by Turkish military. Marko Lerinski died in the battle while all other fighters managed to escape. Dine Abduramanov refused to escape with his friends, barricaded himself in his own house and continued the battle with the Turkish military alone for a period of six hours. The Turks used his wife, daughter, sister and uncle, but Dine refused to surrender and he killed his relatives firing against the siege. When he ran out of ammunition, he went against the Turks with his yataghan and was killed. According to the historian and biographer Hristo Silyanov, who was also a revolutionary of IMARO:

Dine cleaned the shame of the village with one of the rarest heroisms in the Macedonian freedom fighting and in the history of revolutions as a whole.
