= Anarchism in Bulgaria =

Anarchism in Bulgaria first appeared in the 1860s, within the national movement seeking independence from the Ottoman Empire, strongly influenced by the Russian revolutionary movement. Anarchism established itself as a distinct political movement at the end of the 19th century. It developed further in the 20th century, so much so that Bulgaria was one of the few countries in Eastern Europe where the organized anarchist movement enjoyed a real establishment throughout the country, until the seizure of power by the Bulgarian Communist Party. Under the People's Republic of Bulgaria, the anarchist movement survived underground, but was the victim of severe repression. From 1989, anarchism has been freely reconstituted.

== History ==
Anarchism in Bulgaria has its roots in the Bogomils, a medieval socio-religious movement that resisted the authority of the church and the state. According to Bulgarian historian Georgi Khadzhiev, for centuries Bulgarians preserved traditions that "contain[ed] elements of libertarian communism."

=== Early developments ===
During the late 19th century, prominent figures of the Bulgarian National Revival, including Lyuben Karavelov and Hristo Botev, first came into contact with anarchism. Under the influence of Russian anarchist Mikhail Bakunin, Bulgarians joined the International Workingmen's Association (IWA) and participated in the uprisings of the Paris Commune and Herzegovina. Botev himself was inspired by Bakunin to take anarchist communism back to Bulgaria, where he communicated the philosophy through his poetry. Anarchists also went on to participate in the movement for the liberation of Bulgaria from the Ottoman Empire, with Botev being killed during the April Uprising of 1876. During the uprising, Georgi Benkovski led guerrillas in the capture of Panagyurishte and ran the city as a commune, influenced by the Paris Commune. All cattle were brought under common ownership, food was handed out for free and money was abolished, while non-essential goods were distributed by a system of labour vouchers. But the implementation of a truly self-managed economy was halted after 10 days, when the Ottoman Empire re-captured the city from the Bulgarians.

In 1879, the Principality of Bulgaria was constituted as an independent state. By this time, Dimitar Blagoev and Spiro Gulabchev had brought socialist ideas back from their studies in Russia, initially influenced by Marxism but later moving towards anarchism. During the 1890s, the Bulgarian anarchist movement began to organise itself in Plovdiv, where the first anarchist journals such as Borba (English: Fight) were published.

Many anarchists also became heavily involved in the Macedonian Struggle, believing that national liberation could further their libertarian communist objectives. In 1893, Bulgarian anarchists established the Macedonian Secret Revolutionary Committee (MTRK) which, through its organ Otmastenie (English: Revenge), rejected ethnic nationalism and called for the formation of a Balkan Federation. In 1903, MTRK member Mihail Gerdzhikov led the short-lived Preobrazhenie Uprising against Ottoman rule in East Thrace. During the uprising, he and other anarchists helped establish the Strandzha Commune, the first Bulgarian experiment in libertarian communism. But after a month, the Ottomans repressed the uprising, without any intervention by the Bulgarian state. When Gerdzhikov returned to Bulgaria, he was imprisoned and his magazine banned, due to political repression that had followed a transit workers' strike.

By this time, anarchism had been overtaken in popularity by Marxism, as anarchists had only participated in various national liberation movements, but not yet constructed a specifically anarchist movement.

=== Growth and consolidation ===
Anarcho-syndicalism arrived in Bulgaria at the turn of the 20th century, when Varban Kilifarski founded a rural trade union, began publishing the journal Besvlastie and translated anarchist works into Bulgarian. With the outbreak of the Balkan Wars in 1912, he fled to France, where he worked at Sébastien Faure's progressive school and participated in the local class struggle, for which he was often arrested and imprisoned. During World War I, Bulgarian anarchists published a number of new journals, participated in the anti-militarist movement and refused military service, resulting in 40 anarchists being found guilty of anti-war agitation by military tribunals.

Following the end of the war, the Bulgarian anarchist movement experienced a period of growth, carrying out an underground campaign of action against the government. In 1919, anarchists participated in a rail workers' strike, which contributed to the defeat of Pyotr Wrangel's White Army in Ukraine. In June 1919, the Federation of Anarchist-Communists of Bulgaria (FAKB) was established and, after the Bulgarian Agrarian National Union was elected to lead the government, anarchist organisations were legalised for the first time. Now able to act in the open, the FAKB expanded its activities, held public congresses and published a number of magazines. This period was brought to an end by the 1923 Bulgarian coup d'état, during which 26 anarchists were executed without trial.

=== Underground activities ===
In reaction to the coup, anarchists participated in the September Uprising, during which many were killed resisting the new fascist government of Aleksandar Tsankov. In 1925, another anti-fascist revolt broke out in the Sredna Gora and Balkan Mountains, but it was suppressed and many anarchists were executed without trial. Despite the rise of fascism, the Bulgarian anarchist movement continued to grow throughout the 1920s and 1930s, with the anarchist tobacco worker Manol Vassev organising a peasants movement. But by the time of the 1934 Bulgarian coup d'état, the anarchist movement had retreated underground and many anarchists were forced into exile, imprisoned or killed. A number of the exiled anarchists joined the Republican faction during the Spanish Civil War and returned to Bulgaria to fight against the fascist regime, which was finally overthrown in 1944.

Bulgarian anarchists initially welcomed the 1944 Bulgarian coup d'état, which overthrew the Kingdom of Bulgaria and established the People's Republic of Bulgaria. In October 1944, the FAKB was re-established and began publication of its paper Rabotniceska Missal. In March 1945, it held a conference to discuss the establishment of formal relations with the Fatherland Front, but before the conference could start, its delegates were all arrested by the militia and confined in internment camps.

International pressure secured their release and the FAKB continued its activities, gaining popularity and falling under further political repression, with the government banning its journal and forcing the anarchist movement underground by 1946. Shortly before the 5th Congress of the Bulgarian Communist Party was opened in December 1948, 600 anarchists were arrested en masse and interned in the Belene labour camp, intending to suppress any libertarian communist sentiments from being expressed during the congress. Anarchism was thus outlawed and anarchists began to flee into exile, but as border controls got stricter, those that attempted to leave were taken to internment camps. After continuing his work underground for 22 years, Manol Vasev was found and executed by the communist regime in 1957. This vast repression led to the destruction of the anarchist movement organized in the country until 1989. According to State Security, the various anarcho-communist, anarcho-syndicalist and other libertarian organizations had 2,917 members at the time of their liquidation.

In 1952, the Our Road journal and publishing house was established in Paris. It went on to play a key role in the resurgence of Bulgarian anarchism, with emigrant anarchist organisations such as the Union of Bulgarian Anarchists in Exile being established.

=== Contemporary period ===
In 1989, Todor Zhivkov was removed from power, giving way to democratization and the restoration of civil liberties in Bulgaria. The Federation of Anarchists in Bulgaria (FAB) was established, declaring its aim to be the abolition of the state, the securing of well-being for all and the establishment of free communes.

== See also ==
- Category:Bulgarian anarchists
- List of anarchist movements by region
- Boatmen of Thessaloniki
- Anarchism in Romania
- Anarchism in Turkey

== Bibliography ==
- Balkanski, Georges (1965). G. Cheïtanov, pages d'histoire du mouvement libertaire bulgare (in French). Paris: Éditions Notre route.
- ————————— (1982). "Histoire du mouvement libertaire en Bulgarie: esquisse" [History of the libertarian movement in Bulgaria: sketch]. Volonté anarchiste (in French). No. 16–17. Fédération Anarchiste. ISSN 0181-4389.
- Bojanev, Vladimir (1991). "Bulgaria: The History of the Bulgarian Anarchist Movement". The Raven. Vol. 4, no. 1. pp. 31–35. ISSN 0951-4066.
- Khadzhiev, Georgi (1992). "The Transfiguration Uprising and the 'Strandzha Commune': The First Libertarian Commune in Bulgaria". Националното освобождение и безвластният федерализъм [National Liberation and Libertarian Federalism] (in Bulgarian). Translated by Firth, Will. Sofia: Artizdat-5. pp. 99–148. OCLC 27030696.
- Schmidt, Michael; Grancharoff, Jack (2008). The Anarchist-Communist Mass Line: Bulgarian Anarchism Armed. Fordsburg: Zabalaza. OCLC 943891942.
- Stoïnov, Nikola (1963). Un Centenaire bulgare parle (in French). Paris: Éditions Notre Route. p. 189.
- van der Walt, Lucien; Schmidt, Michael (2009). "Anarchists and Syndicalists in Anti-imperialist Struggles". Black Flame: The Revolutionary Class Politics of Anarchism and Syndicalism. Edinburgh: AK Press. ISBN 978-1-904859-16-1. LCCN 2006933558. OCLC 1100238201.
