= Petar Angelov (military officer) =

Bulgarian military officer and revolutionary

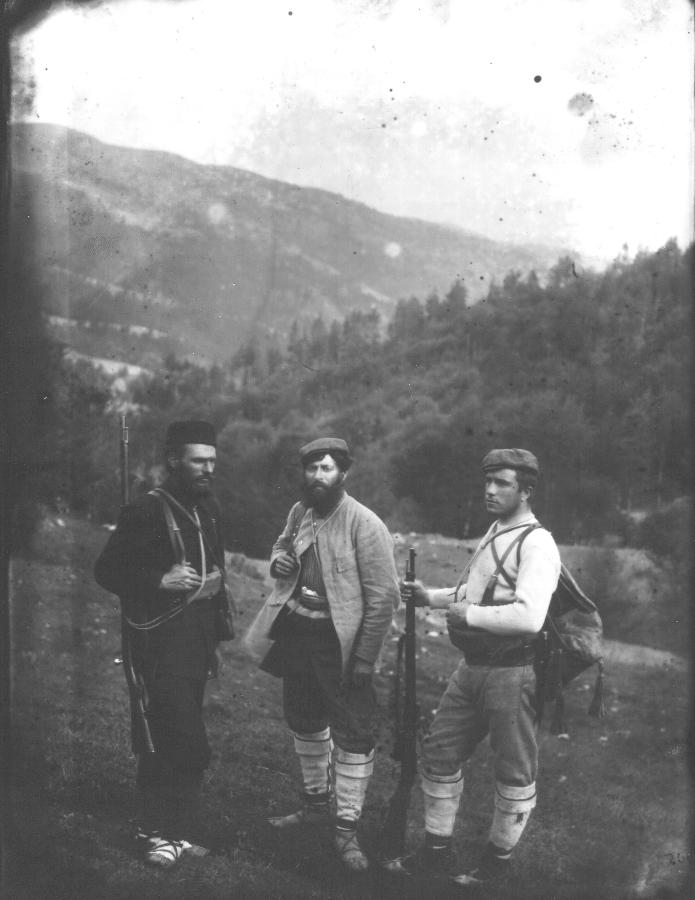
- From left to right Petar Angelov, Krastyo Bulgariata, Nikola Zhekov
- Born: July 19, 1878; Haskovo, Ottoman Empire, today Bulgaria
- Died: August 9, 1923 (aged 45); Sofia, Bulgaria
- Organization: IMARO

Petar Dimitrov Angelov (Bulgarian: Петър Димитров Ангелов) was a Bulgarian military officer and a revolutionary, a member of the Internal Macedonian-Adrianople Revolutionary Organization (IMARO).

Petar Angelov was born in 1878 in Haskovo, in today’s Bulgaria, then part of the Ottoman Empire. After he finished a military academy he served as a sergeant in the 24-th infantry regiment. In 1900 he joined the revolutionary organization IMARO, and in 1903 he became a military instructor in the revolutionary band of Mihail Gerdzhikov in Odrin Thrace.

Petar Angelov was a delegate of the congress held at Petrova Niva on July 11, 1903, and was appointed leader of the Pirgopol revolutionary region in Strandzha. During the Ilinden-Preobrazhenie Uprising, he fought battles in Malko Tarnovo and defeated the Turkish troops in the villages of Madzhura, Kurfokoliba and Ineada.

After the end of the uprising, he went back to Bulgaria and from June 14, 1904, he became a leader in the region of Kriva Palanka. His revolutionary band had 25 members: 14 freedom fighters were born in the liberated parts of Bulgaria, Rudolf Goliyat came from Austria and Anton Hoshek was a Czech. On January 2, 1905, he participated at the Congress of Skopje in the village of Knezhevo.

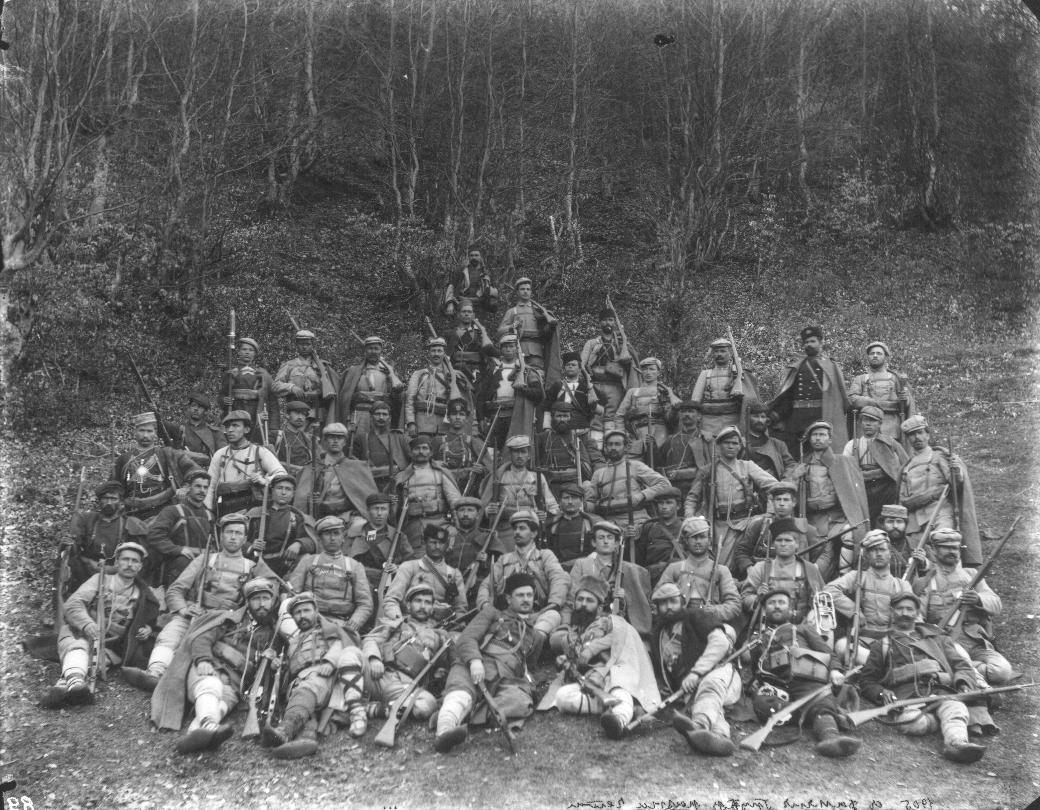
The joined band at the Congress with the leaders Efrem Chuchkov, Mishe Razvigorov, Atanas Babata, Stefan Dimitrov, Krastyo Balgariyata, Petar Angelov, Kosta Nunkov.

At the second Congress of the Skopje Revolutionary Region during November 1906, he became an illegal member of the Skopje regional revolutionary committee.

Petar Angelov participated in the Balkan Wars in the revolutionary band of Yane Sandanski, and later in the third company of the fifth Odrin Battalion of the Macedonian-Adrianopolitan Volunteer Corps in the Bulgarian Army. In 1913, he was promoted to the rank of an officer for his courage. He also participated in the First World War, after which he retired.

He was killed in 1923 in Sofia by activists of the rivaling right-wing IMRO faction.
