= Anastas Razboynikov =

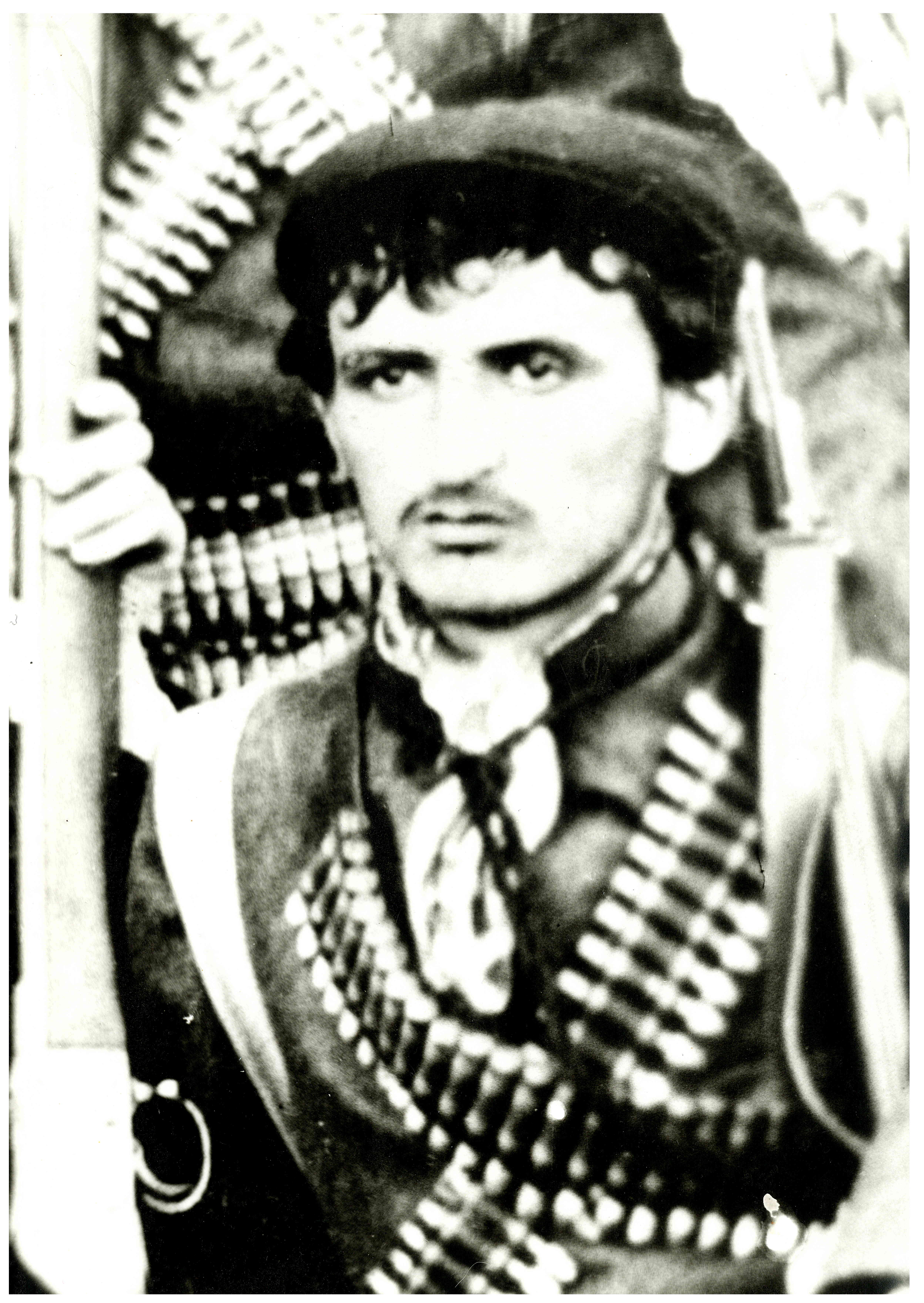
- Born: December 27, 1872; Mustafa pasha, Ottoman Empire, present-day Svilengrad, Bulgaria
- Died: January 9, 1967; Sofia, Bulgaria
- Organization: IMARO

Anastas Spasov Razboynikov (Bulgarian: Анастас Спасов Разбойников) was a Bulgarian revolutionary and teacher, a worker of the Internal Macedonian-Adrianople Revolutionary Organization (IMARO).

Anastas Razboynikov was born in 1882 in the town of Mustafa Pasha (today known as Svilengrad) in the Ottoman Empire. He finished the Bulgarian Men's High School of Adrianople in 1901-1902. In this school he together with his classmates founded a revolutionary group of students. After he finished the school, he became a major teacher for the region of Bunarhisar. There he met the revolutionary band of Ivan Shishmanov with the goal of organising revolutionary activities among the population. During the Ilinden-Preobrazhenie Uprising he was a freedom fighter in the revolutionary band of Stoyan Petrov.

He was a delegate of the Congress of Petrova Niva as a representative of the Bunarhisar revolutionary region and, together with Hristo Silyanov, he was elected secretary of the congress. He died in Sofia in 1967.
