= Manol Vasev =

Bulgarian anarchist

Manol Vassev (Bulgarian: Манол Васев; 1898 - 1958), real name Yordan Sotirov (Bulgarian: Йордан Сотиров) was a Bulgarian anarchist and syndicalist, considered to personify militant syndicalism and anarcho-communism in Bulgaria.

== Life ==
Manol Vassev was born Jordan Sotirov in the town of Kyustendil in Bulgaria. He entered the tobacco industry as a worker during his teenage years, and his experiences there went on to form his worldview and opinions. During the First World War, he became an anarchist, and after being demobilized, he became a workplace organizer. In 1923, he gave the idea to form a political detachment locally. After wounding an army officer during a strike in Kustendil, Vassev was sentenced to 15 years in prison. However, he escaped, took the pseudonym Manol Vassev, and moved to Haskovo. In 1932, still working in the tobacco industry, he published the pamphlet Tongata. During the 1930s, he helped organize the Vlassovden peasant movement along with Gueorgui Sarafov and other anarchists in the area.

During the Second World War, Vassev was arrested on 10 March 1945 at Kniajevo and sent to Dupnitsa concentration camp, but was released following public protests. Vassev assisted resistance movements in Bulgaria, becoming a popular figure in Haskovo after helping the resistance avoid a trap on 8 September 1945. Convicted of illegal possession of a weapon, serving five years at the prison in Sliven. Vassev died in prison allegedly due to a deliberate poisoning by Bulgarian secret police the day before he was due to be released on 11 March 1958.
