= Tsarevna Miladinova =

Bulgarian educator

Tsarevna Miladinova-Alexieva
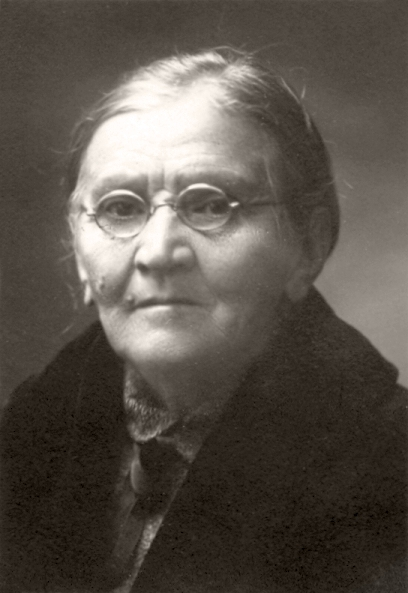
- Born: 1856; Struga, Ottoman Empire
- Died: 1934 (aged 77–78); Sofia, Bulgaria
- Occupations: Educator, founding director of the Bulgarian Girls' High School of Thessaloniki

Tsarevna Miladinova-Aleksieva (Bulgarian: Царевна Миладинова; 1856–1934) was a Bulgarian educator who became a driving force behind girls' education in what was then the Ottoman Empire, known for her role in founding the Bulgarian Girls' High School of Thessaloniki.

== Early life and education ==
Tsarevna Miladinova was born in 1856 in Struga, a town in what is now North Macedonia.

Her father was Dimitar Miladinov, an influential folklorist and activist in the Bulgarian national movement, and she would share his Bulgarian nationalist views throughout her life.

When she was a child, the Russian consul noticed her reading during church services, and he offered to bring her with him to Russia to pursue her education. After taking him up on his offer, she graduated from a girls' high school in Kyiv, becoming one of various female members of the intelligentsia educated in Russia at that time.

== Career ==
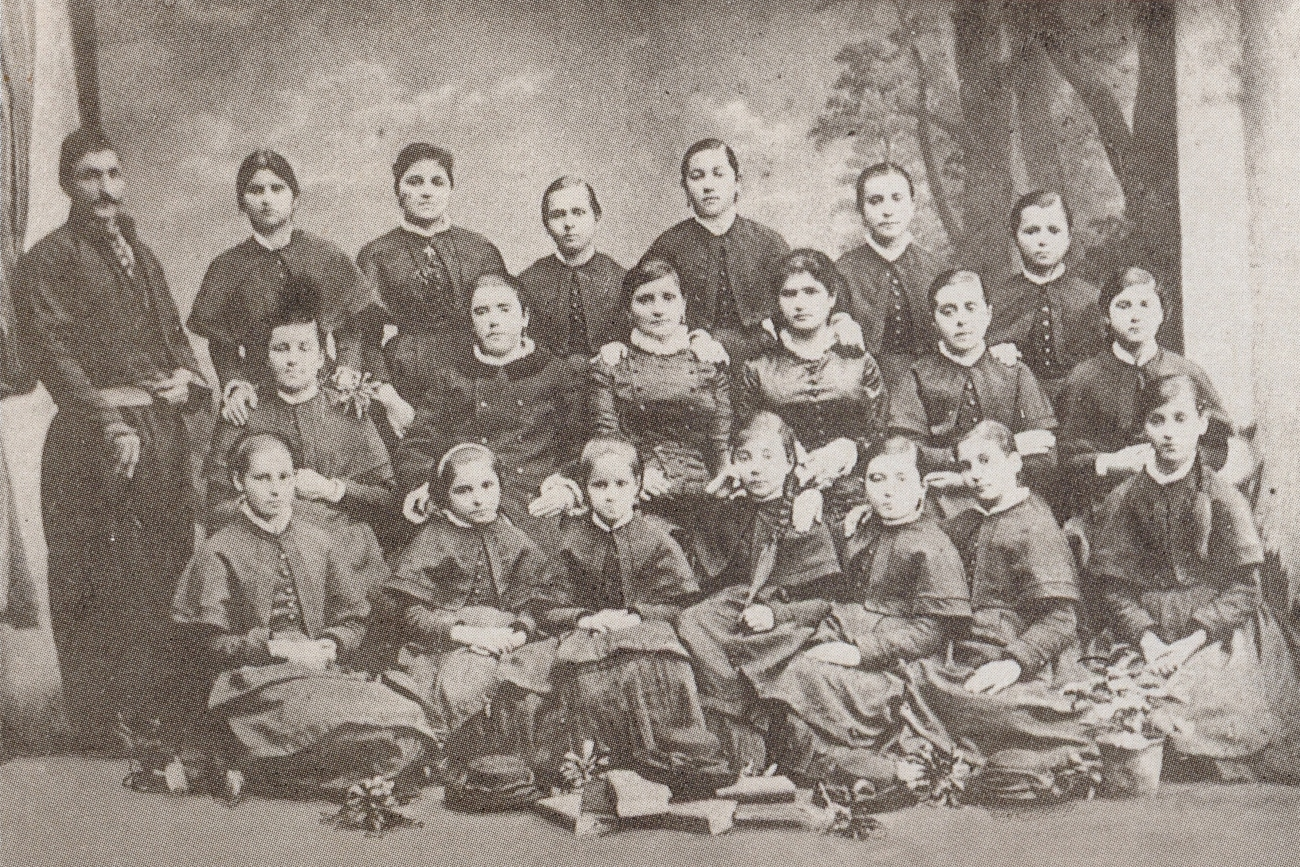
Tsarevna Miladinova, the founder of the first Bulgarian girls' school in Thessaloniki, with teachers and students in the 1882–1883 school year. She is in the middle of the middle row.

After finishing school, Miladinova returned to Bulgaria and worked as a teacher while helping to found girls' schools across the region, including in Shumen, Etropole, Svishtov, and Prilep.

She taught a special class for girls within a boys' school in Shumen in the mid-1870s. Then, after working in Svishtov for a period, she gave up her position there to move to Thessaloniki, in what is now Greece, where efforts at educating young Bulgarians were beginning. She lived in Thessaloniki from 1882 to 1913, and she is best known for her work at the Bulgarian Girls' High School of Thessaloniki, which she co-founded. She was the first director of the school, which opened in 1882.

Miladinova was one of Bulgaria's best-known teachers of the period, and in her later years her writings on her life and ideas appeared in various regional magazines.

== Death and legacy ==
Miladinova died in 1934 in Sofia, Bulgaria.

Her writings were first compiled and published posthumously as Epoha, zemya i hora in 1939. An updated version with unpublished manuscripts and documents was then published under the same title in 1985.
