= Yanka Kanevcheva =

Yanka Kanevcheva Янка Каневчева
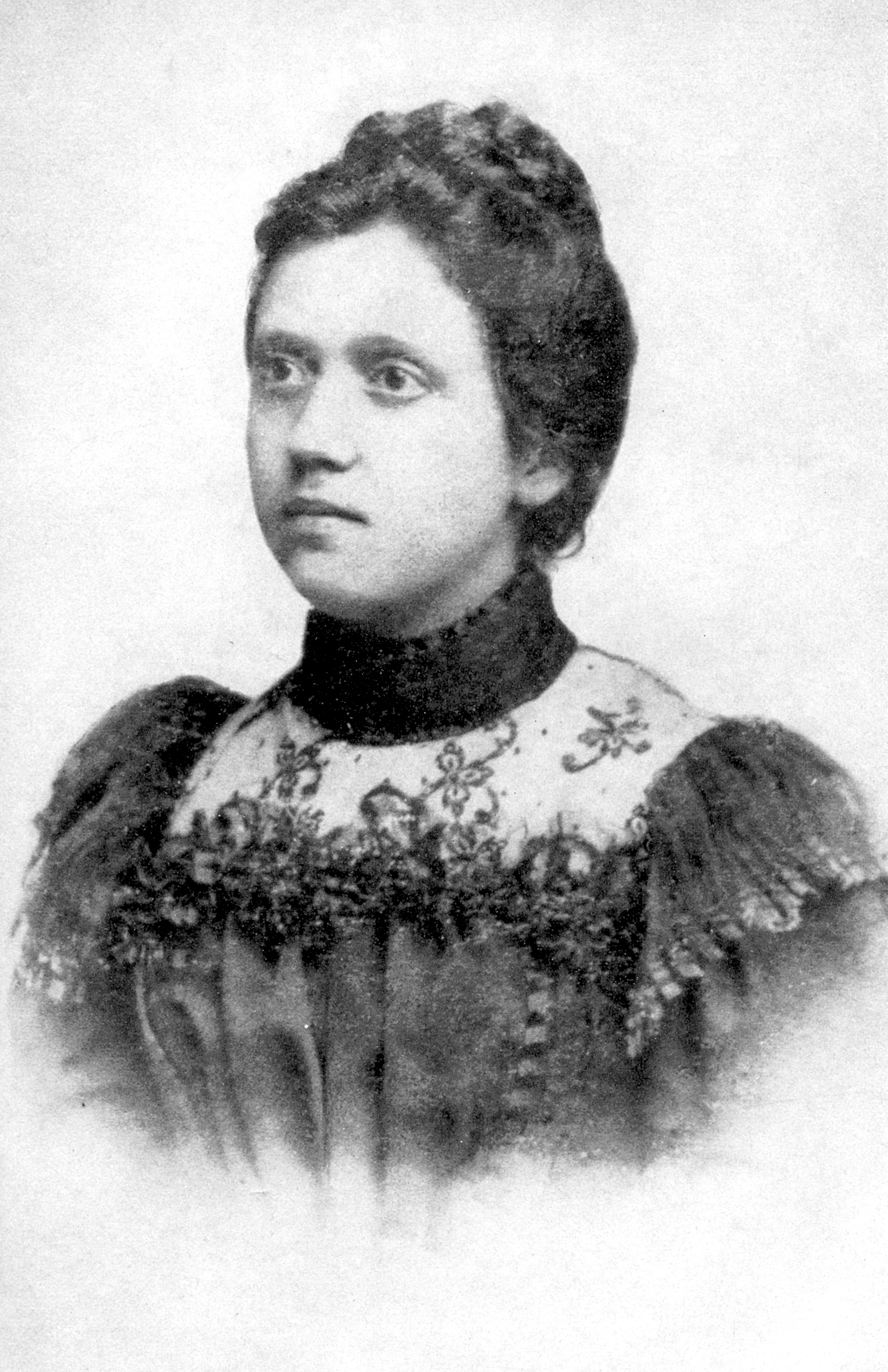
- Born: 11 June 1878; Ohrid, Ottoman Empire
- Died: 3 March 1920 (aged 41)
- Occupation: Revolutionary

Justiniana (Yanka) Gerdjikova Kanevcheva (11 June 1878 – 3 March 1920) was a Bulgarian revolutionary, a member of the Internal Macedonian Revolutionary Organization.

== Biography ==
Yanka Kanevcheva was born in Ohrid in 1878. Later her parents moved to Sofia where she graduated from high school and continued to follow philosophy at Sofia University.

Kanevcheva joined the IMORO and participated in the female revolutionary group led by teacher Slavka Pushkarova from Struga, together with Lyuba Kuppeva from Veles, Macedonia and Amalia Pridjianova, later the wife of Clement Shapkarev. This group acted as fundraisers for the organisation. She was favored by Gotse Delchev. In 1900, she planned with Delchev, Gyorche Petrov and Boris Sarafov the kidnapping of Nikola Geshov, the son of Ivan Evstratiev Geshov, but this was abandoned as the Geshov family left for Paris.

After the death of Delchev, Kanevcheva married Mihail Gerdzhikov. From their marriage have a daughter - Magdalene. She died in 1920 from tuberculosis.

He died in Plovdiv, or Sofia, Bulgaria, or according to other data in Switzerland.

== Bibliography ==
- McDermott, Mercia (1987). For freedom and perfection: biography of Yane Sandanski. Journeyman Press.
- Gerdzhikov, Michael (1984). спомени, документи, материали [Memoirs, Papers, Materials] (in Bulgarian). Sofia: Science and Art Publishing House.
- McDermott, Mercia (1978). Freedom or Death: Biography of Gotse Delchev. Sofia: Science and Art Publishing House.
