= Efrem Chuchkov =

Bulgarian revolutionary and IMARO vojvoda

- Ефрем Чучков
- Born: c. 1870; Štip, Ottoman Empire
- Died: Sofia, Bulgaria, 1923
- Occupations: Revolutionary; IMARO vojvoda
- Organization: Internal Macedonian-Adrianople Revolutionary Organization (IMARO)
- Known for: Leader in the Adrianople Revolutionary District; associate of Gotse Delchev

Efrem Chuchkov (Bulgarian: Ефрем Чучков; c. 1870 – after 1913) was a Bulgarian revolutionary, a prominent vojvoda (band leader) of the Internal Macedonian-Adrianople Revolutionary Organization (IMARO), and a close associate of Gotse Delchev in the Adrianople Revolutionary District.

== Early life ==
Precise details of Chuchkov's birth and upbringing are uncertain. He is believed to have been born in the late 1860s or early 1870s in the Küstrinli (Kjustinli) region of the Adrianople Vilayet of the Ottoman Empire.

He grew up during a period of rising Bulgarian national consciousness in Eastern Thrace, where activists began forming networks that evolved into IMARO.

== Activist ==
Chuchkov became a key organizer and leader of the Adrianople Revolutionary District within IMARO. His activities included:

- leading armed bands
- maintaining courier routes and cross-border channels
- organizing supplies, arms shipments, and recruits
- training local guerrilla detachments

He collaborated closely with Gotse Delchev.

=== Ilinden–Preobrazhenie period ===
During the Ilinden–Preobrazhenie Uprising (1903), Chuchkov:

- prepared revolutionary networks in Malko Tarnovo, Lozengrad (Kırklareli), and Adrianople
- maintained communication between Thracian bands and Bulgarian bases
- escorted guerrilla groups across the Bulgarian–Ottoman border
- established and maintained “forest posts” (gorska poshta)
- oversaw transport of explosives, rifles, and couriers

His bands participated in sabotage, protection of Bulgarian villages, and actions against Ottoman informants.

== Associates ==
Archival lists preserve the names of several guerrillas who served under Chuchkov, including:

- Mitre Zavalov – guerrilla from Polyanovo
- Stoyan Chavdarov – courier
- Dimitar Karanfilov – arms transporter
- Additional unnamed fighters recorded in IMARO dispatches

After the Young Turk Revolution (1908), many IMARO fighters returned to civilian life. Documentation of Chuchkov's activities after 1913 is limited, and the date of his death is unknown.

== Legacy ==
Chuchkov is an important organizer of IMARO's Thracian underground. His legacy is preserved through:

- IMARO personnel lists and dispatch documents
- Bulgarian historical scholarship on the national liberation movement
- museum exhibitions about the Ilinden–Preobrazhenie period
- publications in Bulgarian historical media

== See also ==
- Internal Macedonian-Adrianople Revolutionary Organization
- Ilinden–Preobrazhenie Uprising
- Gotse Delchev
- Adrianople Revolutionary District
- Macedonian–Thracian revolutionary movement
