= Lazar Madzharov =

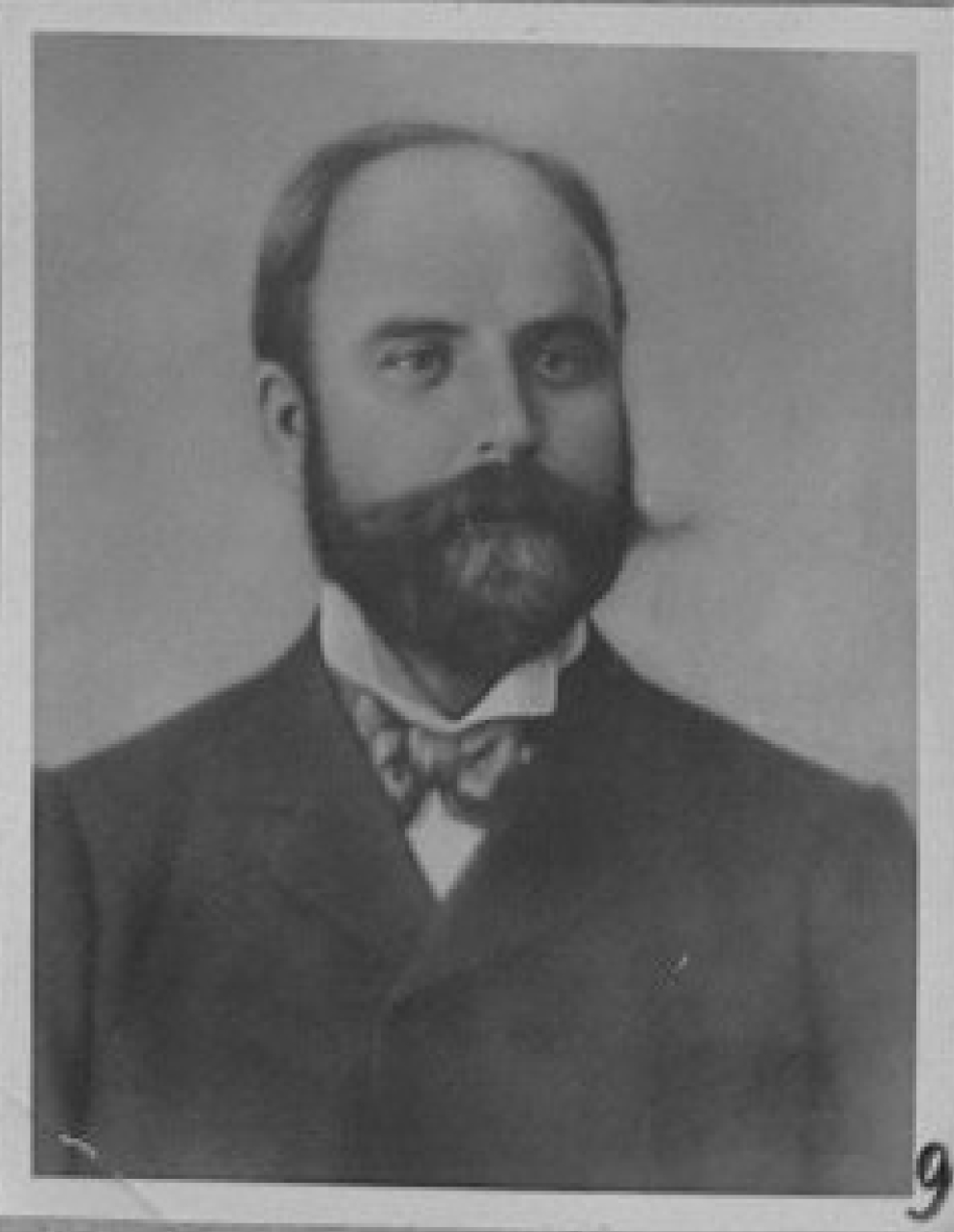
- Born: March 1872; Negovan, Ottoman Empire (modern Xylopoli, Greece)
- Died: November 10, 1907 (aged 35); Ladzhakyoy, Ottoman Empire (modern Loutros, Evros, Greece)
- Other names: Lazo

Lazar Madzharov (Bulgarian: Лазар Маджаров) was a Bulgarian teacher, revolutionary and member of the Internal Macedonian Revolutionary Organization (IMRO).

== Biography ==
He was born in 1872 in the village of Negovan, Ottoman Empire (modern Xylopoli, Greece). Madzharov was the son of Archimandrite Ivan Madzharov, a Bulgarian archbishop in Thessaloniki. In 1892 he graduated from the Thessaloniki Bulgarian School. Later he went to Bulgaria and became a teacher in Zheravna and in the Rila.

In 1897 he was appointed by the Bulgarian Exarchate as chief teacher of the Bulgarian schools in Lozengrad. He entered the IMRO and headed the local Revolutionary Committee. Madzharov expanded the revolutionary committee network in Lozengrad area. In 1899 he became illegal. He had accompanied Gotse Delchev during his tour around Edirne in 1900. After the Keremidchioglu affair, he headed a cheta, which restored the broken committee network. In April 1902 he participated in the Plovdiv Congress of IMRO, where he was elected leader of the Lozengrad Revolutionary Region. Madzharov was a delegate is at the Petrova Niva congress, where he was elected as a member of the main Committee. He participated in the Ilinden-Preobrazhenie Uprising in Strandzha. After the uprising, he strengthened the organization in the Rhodopes and Western Thrace. At the congress of the Adrianople revolutionary district in Varna in 1904 he was elected a member of the main body of the Adrianople region. Madzharov participated in the Rila Congress in 1905. He was killed in 1907 near the village of Ladzhakoy, Dedeagach area in a clash with an Ottoman detachment. together with Petar Vaskov, Georgi Geshanov, Chanko Karabrakanov and Yanaki Milkov.
