= Marko Lerinski =

Bulgarian revolutionary (1862–1902)

Voivode Marko Lerinski
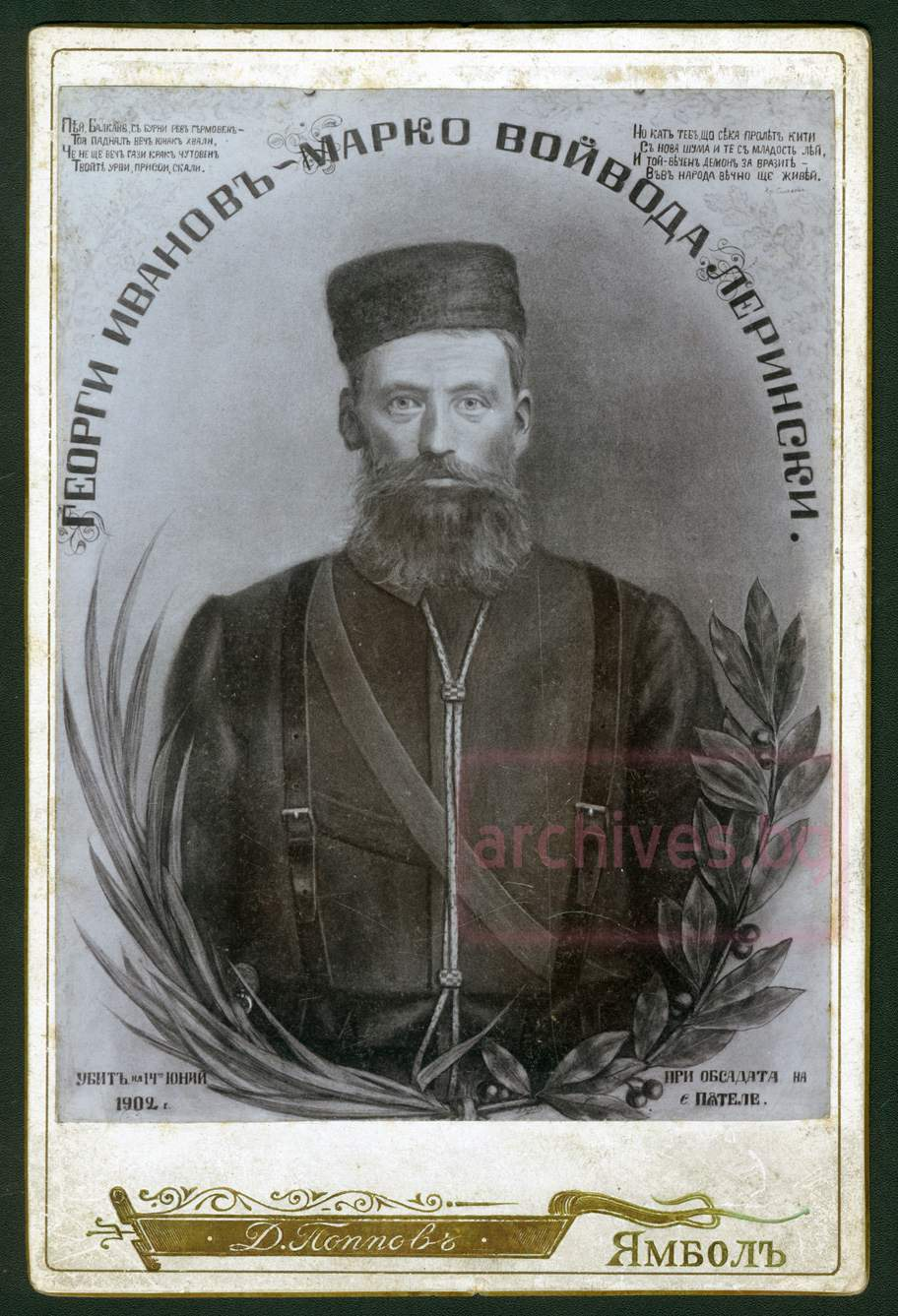
- Marko Lerinski c. 1902
- Native name: Марко Лерински
- Born: Georgi Ivanov Gyurov; Георги Иванов Гюров; 20 June 1862; Kotel, Adrianople Vilayet, Ottoman Empire (now Bulgaria)
- Died: 13 June 1902 (aged 39) Patele, Monastir Vilayet, Ottoman Empire (now Agios Panteleimonas, Greece)
- Buried: Sorovich (now Amyntaio, Greece)
- Allegiance: Principality of Bulgaria; IMRO
- Branch: Bulgarian Army
- Service years: 1883-1900
- Conflicts: Serbo-Bulgarian War; Action of 1895; Macedonian Struggle †

Georgi Ivanov Gyurov (Bulgarian: Георги Иванов Гюров; 20 June 1862 – 13 June 1902), known under the alias Marko Lerinski (Bulgarian: Марко Лерински), was a Bulgarian military officer and revolutionary. He was one of Internal Macedonian–Adrianople Revolutionary Organization's most effective leaders in the Lerin (Florina) district.

== Life ==
Georgi Ivanov Gyurov was born on 20 June 1862 in Kotel in Ottoman Rumelia (Northern Thrace), today a town in central eastern Bulgaria. In 1883, he joined the Principality of Bulgaria's armed forces. He took part in the Serbo-Bulgarian War of 1885. For his bravery, he was awarded a medal and promoted. In 1895, he participated in Supreme Macedonian–Adrianople Committee, anti-Ottoman action as part of Stoyo Kostov's detachment, which involved an attack on Dospat. After the action, he returned to the army.

He served as a non-commissioned officer until he left the army in 1900. In 1901, he got in contact with Macedonian Bulgarian revolutionaries Gotse Delchev and Gyorche Petrov, who recruited him in IMARO. They dispatched him as a regional leader (voivode) for the Lerin region (today Florina, Greece), where he adopted the alias Marko Lerinski. Lerinski created a training center in the Lerin district in the 1900s, where he trained aspiring voivodes. Thanks to Lerinski's military training and his organizational abilities, his detachment became a school for voivodes and members of IMARO. According to fellow IMARO member and writer Hristo Silyanov, Marko Lerinski turned Lerin into "... a region of model in every respect. Enthustiastic activists, strict organization, a disciplined and, in the full sense of the words, propagandist and organizational detachment. That was all the work of Marko from Kotel."

Lerinski was the first person to suggest a common uprising in both Macedonia and the Adrianople Vilayet, an idea that would be put into practice with the Ilinden–Preobrazhenie Uprising of 1903. Lerinski died in a clash with Ottoman forces in Patele (Agios Panteleimonas, Florina, Greece) on 13 June 1902. He was buried in Sorovich.

== Sources ==
- Енциклопедия "България" (in Bulgarian). Vol. том 4. София: Издателство на Българската академия на науките. 1984.
