= Bulgarian Men's High School of Adrianople =

Coordinates: 41.67794°N 26.54701°E

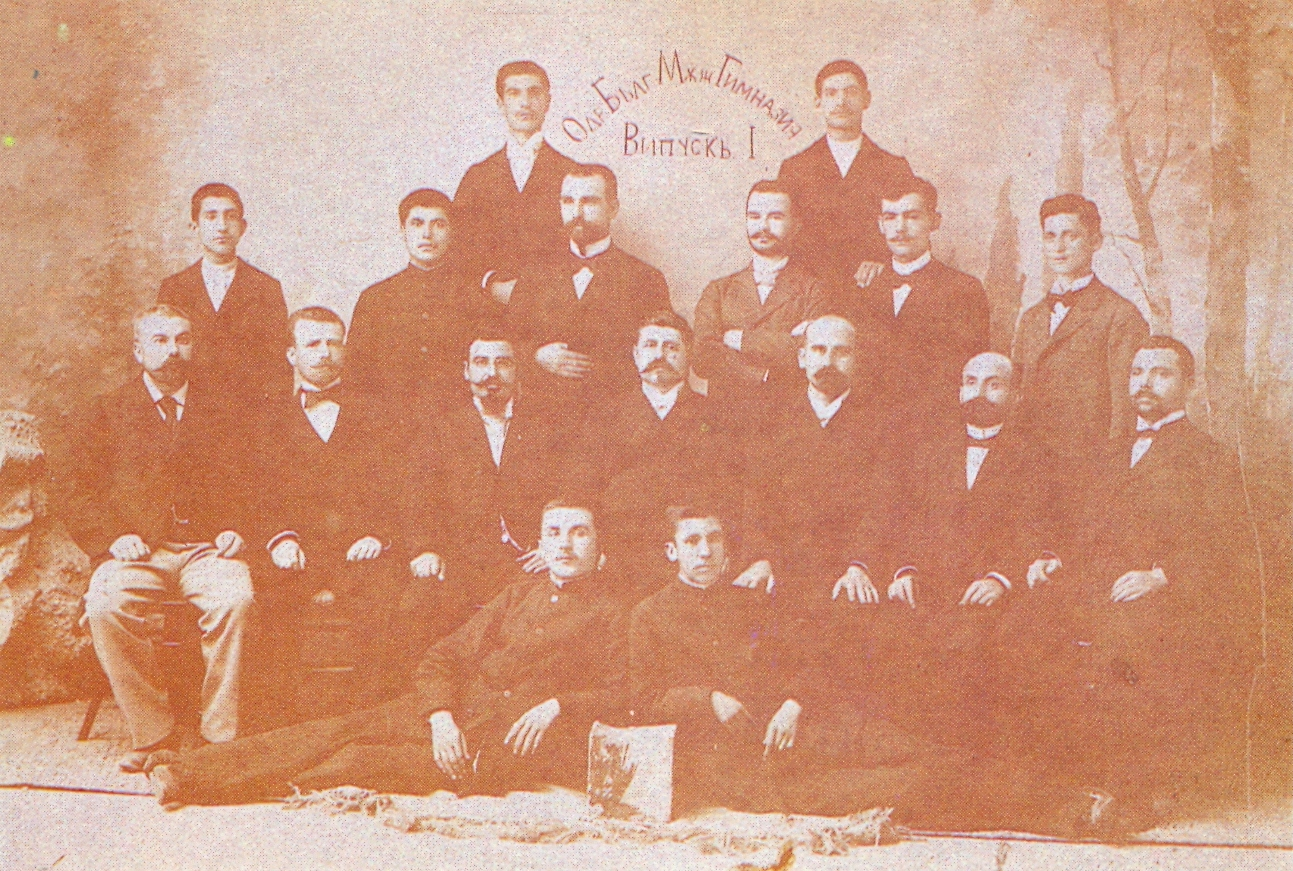
Students from 1st alumni of the Edirne Bulgarian men high school "Dr Peter Beron", together with their teachers. 1898–1899.

The Dr. Petar Beron Bulgarian Men's High School of Addrianople (Bulgarian: Одринска българска мъжка гимназия „Д-р Петър Берон“, Odrinska Balgarska Maszka Gimnaziya „Dr. Petar Beron“) was the first Bulgarian high school in Eastern Thrace. One of the most influential Bulgarian educational centres in Thrace, it was founded in 1891 in Ottoman Adrianople and ceased to exist in 1913 after the Second Balkan War. Among the initiators, principals and teachers at the high school were noted Bulgarian intellectuals, scientists, and public figures of the Bulgarian revolutionary movement and politics of the early 20th century.

== Famous alumni ==
- Atanas Razboynikov

== See also ==
- Bulgarian Men's High School of Thessaloniki
- Education in the Ottoman Empire

== Source ==
- Georgiev, Lyubomir (2011). "The Education of the Bulgarians in Adrianople in the Light of Documents from the National Library in Sofia". International Symposium "Edirne in the Archival Resourches of the Balkan Countries". Trakya Üniversitesi Rektörlüğü Yayınları.Edirne. pp. 11–27. ISBN 9789753741361.
