= Xylopoli =

Xilopoli Ξυλόπολη
- Community
- Location within Greece
- Coordinates: 40°55.6′N 23°10.7′E
- Country: Greece
- Administrative region: Central Macedonia
- Regional unit: Thessaloniki
- Municipality: Lagkadas
- Municipal unit: Lachanas

Area
  - Community: 34.422 km^{2} (13.290 sq mi)
- Elevation: 540 m (1,770 ft)

Population (2021)
  - Community: 601
  - Density: 17.5/km^{2} (45.2/sq mi)
- Time zone: UTC+2 (EET)
  - Summer (DST): UTC+3 (EEST)
- Postal code: 570 17
- Area code: +30-2394
- Vehicle registration: NA to NX

Xylopoli (Greek: Ξυλόπολη, Bulgarian: Негован) is a village and a community of the Lagkadas municipality. Before the 2011 local government reform it was part of the municipality of Lachanas, of which it was a municipal district and the seat. The 2021 census recorded 601 inhabitants in the village. The community of Xylopoli covers an area of 34.422 km^{2}.

== See also ==
- List of settlements in the Thessaloniki regional unit
