= Varban Kilifarski =

Bulgarian revolutionary (1879–1923)

- Върбан Килифарски
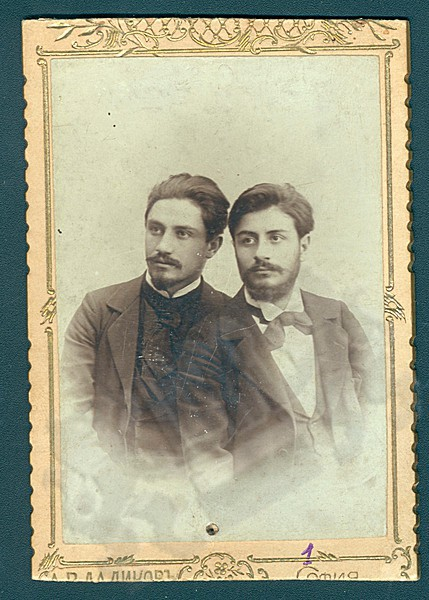
- Varban Kilifarski and his brother on 20 November 1901
- Born: May 25, 1879; Harsovo, near Samuil, Bulgaria
- Died: January 20, 1923 (aged 43); Ashiklar, Bulgaria
- Occupations: Revolutionary, anarchist
- Years active: 1893–1923
- Notable work: Svobodno Opshtestvo, Bezvlastie
- Movement: Anarchism
- Relatives: Aleksandar Kilifarski (brother)

Varban Kilifarski (Bulgarian: Върбан Килифарски), under the pseudonym Gosho (Bulgarian: Гошо), was a Bulgarian revolutionary, anarchist and member of the Internal Macedonian Revolutionary Organization.

== Biography ==
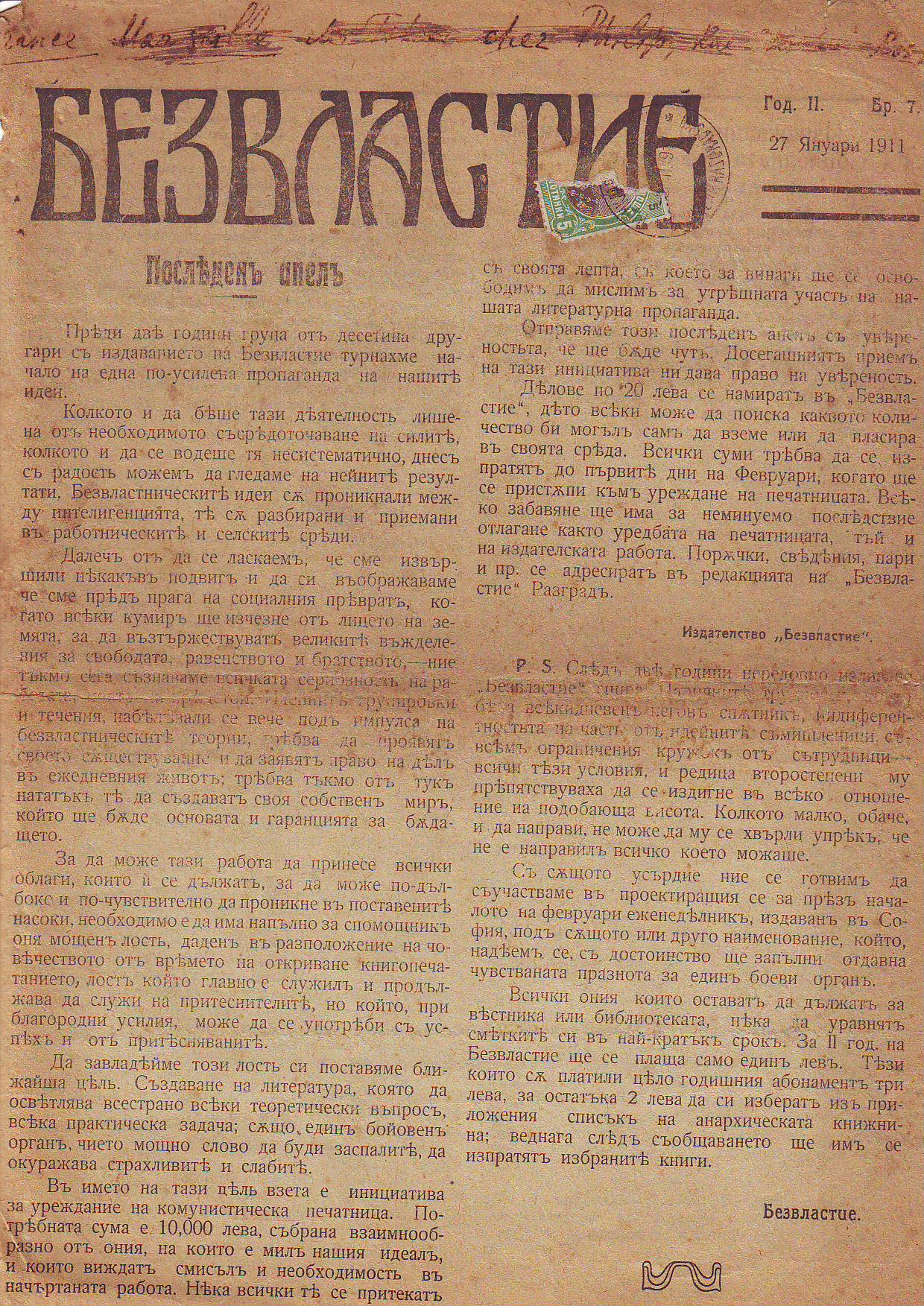
The Bezvlastie newspaper.

He was born in Harsovo, Bulgaria in 1879. He studied at the gymnasium in Razgrad. His brother, Aleksandar Kilifarski, was a teacher in Patele. In 1893 he started his revolutionary activities as a member of a Macedonian Secret Revolutionary Committee. Later Kilifarski became a member of the Internal Macedonian Revolutionary Organization and a friend with Gotse Delchev. During this period, he began to organize kidnappings for ransom. His chetnik was Trayko Gyotov.

Kilifarski left the IMRO, settled in Sofia, and in 1907, together with Mihail Gerdzhikov, founded Svobodno Opshtestvo, the first periodic anarchistic newspaper in Bulgaria, and later, Bezvlastie.

In 1912 he moved to France and joined Sébastien Faure's first labor-anarchist school, "La Rouche". Influenced by the experiments of Francisco Ferrer's Modern School, Kilifarski returned to Bulgaria and began establishing his own school, but the project was abandoned when the First Balkan War broke out in 1912. With the outbreak of the First World War in 1914, Kilifarski moved to Italy, spending part of the time under house arrest, before returning to Bulgaria after the war ended.

Kilifarski settled in his father's farmstead near Ashiklar, where he died on 20 January 1923 after a brief illness.
