= Adrianople revolutionary district =

- Одрински револуционен окръг
- Leader: Mihail Gerdzhikov
- Dates active: July 1894
- Headquarters: Adrianople (Edirne)
- Part of: Bulgarian Macedonian-Adrianople Revolutionary Committees

The Adrianople revolutionary district (Macedonian/Bulgarian: Одрински револуционерен округ/Одрински револуционен окръг) was an organizational grouping of the Bulgarian Macedonian-Adrianople Revolutionary Committees, and its successors, the Secret Macedonian-Adrianople Revolutionary Organization and the Internal Macedonian-Adrianople Revolutionary Organization. The most famous leader of the group was Mihail Gerdzhikov. This rebel group was active in the Adrianople Vilayet with headquarters in Edirne.
