= Hristo Silyanov =

Bulgarian revolutionary, historian, and memoirist

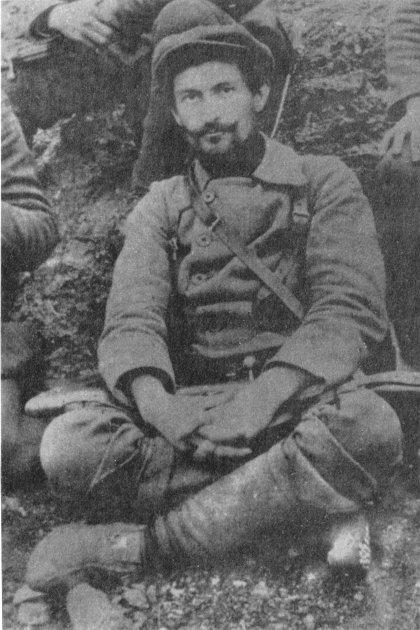
Hristo Silyanov

Hristo Silyanov (1880 in Constantinople, Ottoman Empire – 1939 in Sofia, Bulgaria) (Bulgarian: Христо Силянов) was a Bulgarian revolutionary, historian and memoirist. He was among the activists of the Internal Macedonian Revolutionary Organization and in his memoirs uniquely described the history of the organization in its early period.

The cover of the first volume of the book The Liberation Struggles of Macedonia by Hristo Silyanov.

Silyanov was born in a rich family in Constantinople. His father was a Bulgarian from Ohrid, Macedonia, and his mother was Greek. He studied in Istanbul and Thessaloniki, but graduated from the Bulgarian school in Bitola. Later Silyanov worked as the Bulgarian Exarchate's teacher in various towns in Ottoman Macedonia. After his participation in the Internal Macedonian-Adrianople Revolutionary Organization (IMARO), he joined the cheta led by Marko Lerinski. As result of a severe illness in 1902, Silyanov moved to Sofia for treatment and from there criticized sharply the decision made by IMARO's Central Committee in Thessaloniki concerning the Ilinden–Preobrazhenie Uprising. However, in 1903 he was elected secretary of the Preobrazhenie Uprising committee in a session near Malko Tarnovo. During the Uprising he was a member of Mihail Gerdzhikov's cheta and participated in the battles in Strandzha for the taking of Vasiliko and Ahtopol.

After the Uprising, he graduated in history from Sofia University and afterwards specialized in Switzerland. In 1908 Siljanov was elected to the leading body of IMARO and made unsuccessful attempts to save the unity of the organization. During the Balkan Wars he was the leader of a cheta in Southern Macedonia and supported the Greek and later the Bulgarian Army during their invasions. During the First World War, he was imprisoned in Sofia as a Russophile, when Bulgaria was fighting against Russia. After the wars he settled in Sofia and worked there as a writer, publicist and journalist. Later he also became a politician and a member of the Macedonian Scientific Institute. His son Evgeny Silyanov was a prominent Bulgarian diplomat.

Silyanov Peak in Antarctica is named after Hristo Silyanov.

== Sources ==
- Освободителните борби на Македония, том I, София, 1933
- Освободителните борби на Македония, том II, София 1943
- Писма и изповеди на един четник - Спомени от Странджа - От Витоша до Грамос
- "Към историята на Гръцката Терористическа Пропаганда в Македония" Hristo Silyanov on the history of the Greek terrorist propaganda in Macedonia. Published in Istanbul in 1909 (In Bulgarian).
