= Lachanas =

Village in Central Macedonia, Greece

Lachanas Λαχανάς
- Municipal unit
- Location within the regional unit

- Location within Greece
- Coordinates: 40°58′N 23°12′E
- Country: Greece
- Administrative region: Central Macedonia
- Regional unit: Thessaloniki
- Municipality: Lagkadas

Area
  - Municipal unit: 210.09 km^{2} (81.12 sq mi)
  - Community: 47.602 km^{2} (18.379 sq mi)
- Elevation: 584 m (1,916 ft)

Population (2021)
  - Municipal unit: 1,943
  - Municipal unit density: 9.248/km^{2} (23.95/sq mi)
  - Community: 462
  - Community density: 9.71/km^{2} (25.1/sq mi)
- Time zone: UTC+2 (EET)
  - Summer (DST): UTC+3 (EEST)
- Postal code: 570 17
- Area code: 23940

Lachanas (Greek: Λαχανάς) is a village and a former municipality in the Thessaloniki regional unit, Greece. Since the 2011 local government reform it is part of the municipality Lagkadas, of which it is a municipal unit. The seat of the municipality was in Xylopoli. The municipal unit Lachanas has an area of 210.090 km^{2}, and the community Lachanas has an area of 47.602 km^{2}.

== Population ==
The population of the municipal unit was 1,943 inhabitants in 2021 and that of the community was 462 inhabitants.
