= Mihail Gerdzhikov =

Bulgarian revolutionary and anarchist (1877–1947)

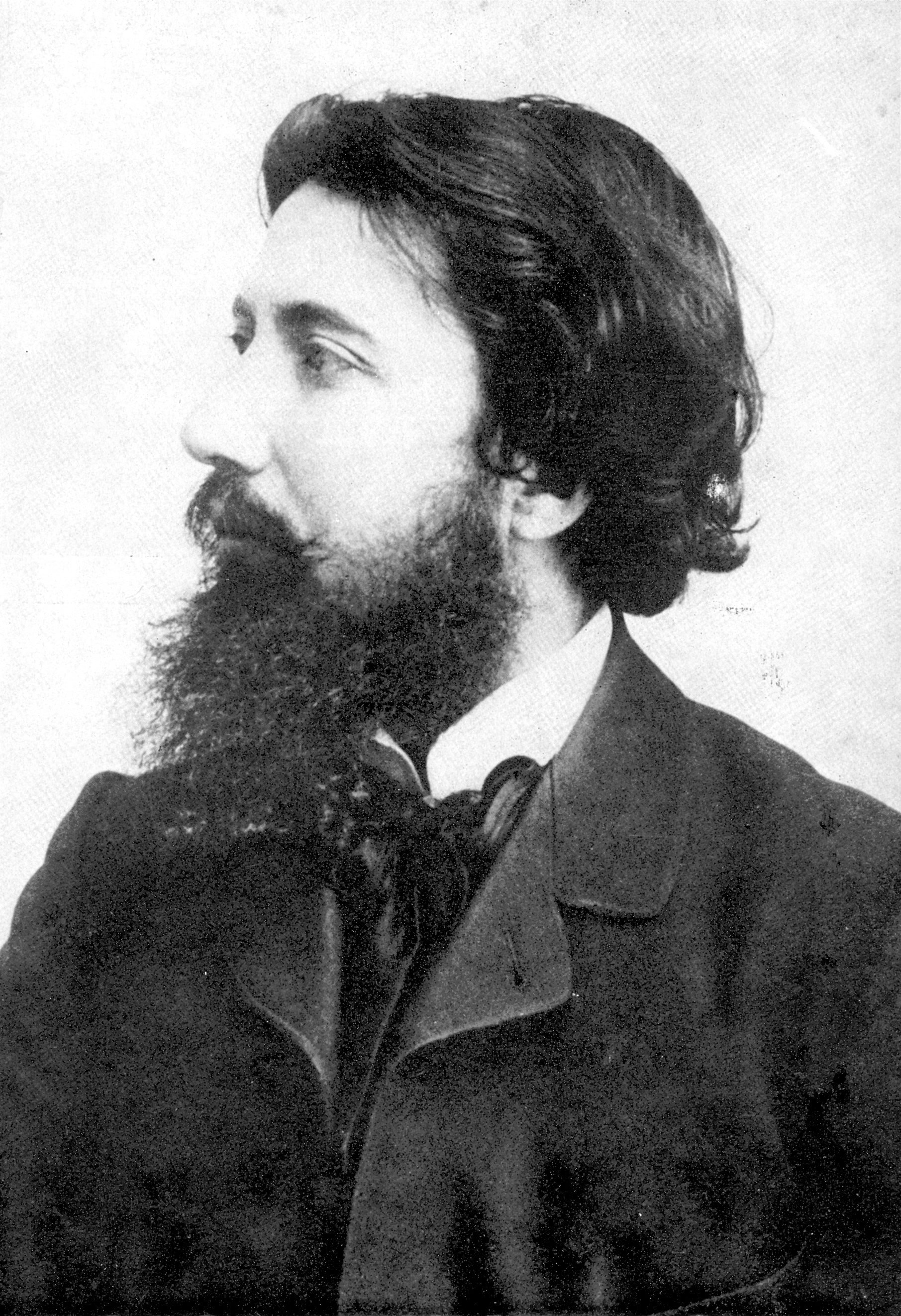
- Born: January 26, 1877; Plovdiv, Ottoman Empire (modern Bulgaria)
- Died: March 18, 1947 (aged 70); Sofia, Bulgaria
- Resting place: Central Sofia Cemetery
- Other name: Michel
- Citizenship: Ottoman Empire (1877–1878); Principality of Bulgaria (1878–1908); Kingdom of Bulgaria (1908–1946); People's Republic of Bulgaria (1946–1947)
- Education: University of Geneva
- Years active: 1895–1946
- Organization(s): MSRC (1895–1899); IMRO (1899–1925); IMRO (U) (1925–1936)
- Known for: Preobrazhenie Uprising, Strandzha Commune
- Movement: Anarchism
- Opponent: Ottoman Empire
- Spouse: Yanka Kanevcheva
- Father: Ivan Gerdzhikov

Mihail Gerdzhikov (Bulgarian: Михаил Герджиков; 1877–1947) was a Bulgarian revolutionary and anarchist.

== Biography ==
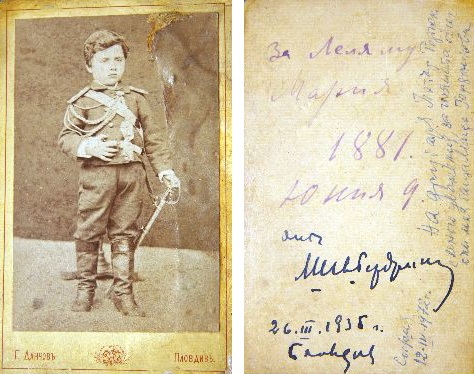
Portrait of the young Mihail Gerdzhikov from the photo gallery of Georgi Danchov

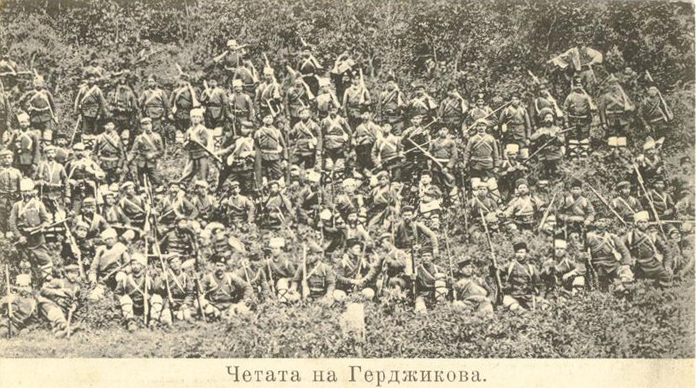
Mikhail Gerdzhikov's troops during the Ilinden-Transfiguration Uprising

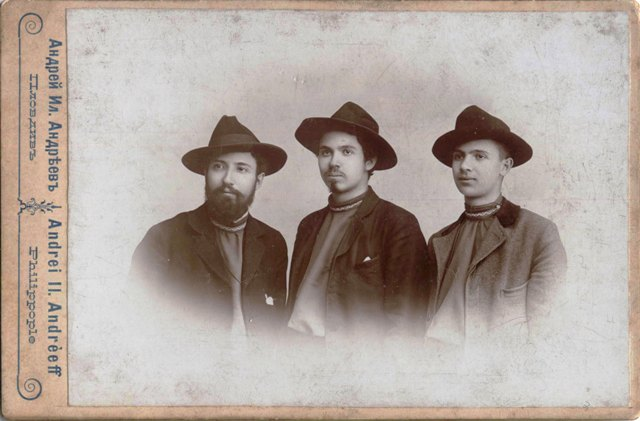
Brothers Michael, Stefan and Nikolay Gerdzhikov, photographer Andrey Andreev, Plovdiv

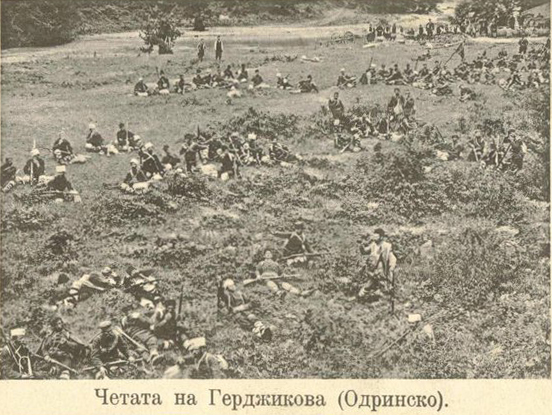
Mikhail Gerdzhikov's Cheta

He was born in Plovdiv, then in the Ottoman Empire, in 1877. He studied at the French College in Plovdiv, where he received the nickname Michel. As a pupil in 1893 he started his revolutionary activities as the leader of a Macedonian Secret Revolutionary Committee (MSRC). As a student in Lausanne and Geneva he participated in the so-called Geneva Group. In 1899 he moved to Ottoman Macedonia and became a teacher at Bulgarian Men's High School in Bitola and joined Internal Macedonian Adrianople Revolutionary Organization, where Gerdzhikov approached Gotse Delchev. In 1900 he was a delegate to the Zlatitsa Society of the Seventh Congress of the Supreme Macedonian-Adrianople Committee (SMAC). In April 1901 he was a delegate of the Eighth Congress of SMAC.

After the defeat of the Strandzha commune during the Preobrazhenie Uprising, he dealt with the accommodation of the rebels who withdrew from Ottoman Thrace to Bulgaria. He published articles in the Bulgarian and foreign press, appealing to the international community for intervention in the resolution of the Eastern question in the Balkans. Together with Varban Kilifarski he also published various newspapers of their own. At the outbreak of the Balkan War in 1912, Gerdzhikov headed the Lozengrad guerrilla unit of the Macedonian-Adrianopolitan Volunteer Corps. He was mobilized into the Bulgarian Army and participated in World War I, serving in the Forty-third Infantry Regiment.

After the War, he was a member of the Provisional representation of the former United Internal Revolutionary Organization and later joined the IMRO (United). Gerdzhikov participated in the Constantinople Conference of the IMRO (United) in 1930 and was a member of the Central Committee as a member of the Foreign Office. But after the conference he did not leave for Berlin, to participate in the Central Committee, but returned to Bulgaria in 1931. He became a journalist and translator. On the eve and during the Second World War, 1939–1945, due to his advanced age, he was mainly engaged in journalism. He has collaborated on a number of periodicals. Although some of his associates were involved in the resistance movement, Gerdzhikov remained aloof, although he maintained ties with them. Following the September 9 coup, he signed in Sofia "Appeal to the Macedonians in Bulgaria".

Gerdzhikov died in 1947, disappointed with the new communist authorities.
