= Mile Popyordanov =

Revolutionary from Macedonia (1877–1901)

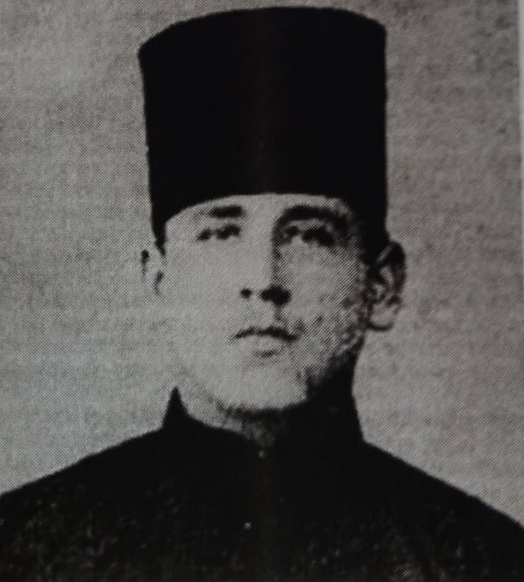
Popyordanov as a Bulgarian Exarchate seminarian.

Mile Popyordanov (Bulgarian: Миле Попйорданов, Macedonian: Миле Поп Јорданов; 1877–1901), born Milan Popyordanov, was a Macedonian Bulgarian revolutionary and member of the Internal Macedonian-Adrianople Revolutionary Organization (IMARO).

== Biography ==
Milan Popyordanov was born in Veles, in the Kosovo Vilayet of the Ottoman Empire (present-day North Macedonia) in 1877. His younger brother, Yordan Popyordanov, was one of the Boatmen of Thessaloniki who launched the Thessaloniki bombings of 1903. Mile Popyordanov studied at the Bulgarian men's high school in the town of Bitola and later at the Constantinople Bulgarian Theological Seminary, before becoming an active member of the Internal Macedonian-Adrianople Revolutionary Organization. Afterwards he worked as a Bulgarian teacher in his native area. As an active member of the IMARO, he later joined the regional detachment operating around Radovis. From the end of 1900 Gotse Delchev appointed Milan Popyordanov as leader of that detachment. At the beginning of March 1901 he arrived in Sofia, Bulgaria by his brother. There Popyordanov persuaded the Bulgarian poet Peyo Yavorov to leave for Macedonia as a guerrilla. As a sign of friendship when leaving, Yavorov presented him with his official suit. In September, on his return to Veles, he was ambushed and surrounded by Ottoman soldiers. Then he was engaged in a shootout with them. In order not to be caught alive, he killed himself. Afterwards the Turkish soldiers disfigured his face beyond recognition. He was identified by the suit given to him by Yavorov. There is a folk song about the death of Popyordanov called "Sick layed down Mile Pop Yordanov" (Bulgarian: Болен ми лежи Миле Попйорданов, Macedonian: Болен ми лежи Миле Поп Јорданов'). He is considered a Macedonian by the historians in North Macedonia.
