= Boatmen of Thessaloniki =

Bulgarian anarchist group

- Гемиджиите
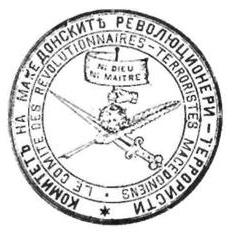
- The seal of the Committee of the Macedonian revolutionaries - terrorists in Geneva (1898).
- Other name: Gemidzhiite
- Founder: Slavi Merdzhanov
- Leaders: Slavi Merdzhanov; Yordan Popyordanov
- Dates active: 1898–1903
- Country: Ottoman Empire
- Allegiance: SMAC; IMARO
- Active regions: Constantinople, Adrianople, Thessaloniki
- Ideology: Anarchism
- Status: Defunct

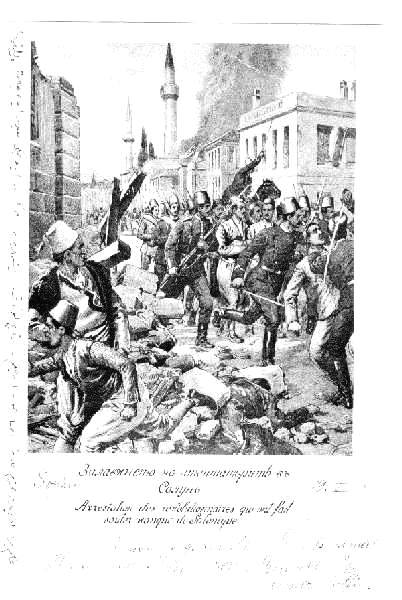
Bulgarian postcard depicting the arrest of surviving members of Gemidzhii, April 1903.

The Boatmen of Thessaloniki (Bulgarian: Гемиджиите, romanized: Gemidzhiite; Macedonian: Гемиџиите, romanized: Gemidžiite) was a Bulgarian anarchist group, active in the Ottoman Empire in the years between 1898 and 1903. The members of the group were predominantly Macedonian Bulgarians from Veles and most of them − young graduates from the Bulgarian Men's High School of Thessaloniki. The group was radicalized by the Bulgarian anarchist Slavi Merdzhanov, whose initial target was the Ottoman capital Constantinople, and subsequently Adrianople. After his execution by the Ottomans in 1901, the group's attention shifted to Thessaloniki. From April 28 until May 1, 1903, the group led a campaign of terror bombing in Thessaloniki. Their aim was to attract the attention of the Great Powers to Ottoman oppression in Macedonia and Adrianople Thrace. The group's roots can be traced to 1898 in Geneva, and nearly all of its founders were natives from Bulgaria. It was associated with the Internal Macedonian-Adrianople Revolutionary Organization, but also had close ties with the Supreme Macedonian-Adrianople Committee. The result of the bombings was disastrous for the Bulgarian community in Thessaloniki. Continuation of the Thessaloniki bombings were the bombing of the passenger train near Kuleliburgaz and the bombing campaign of the passenger ship "Vaskapu" in the Burgas Bay.

== Origins and etymology ==
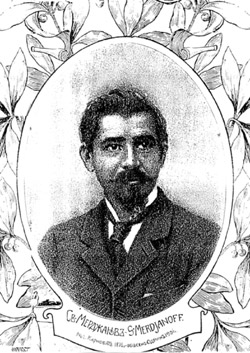
Slavi Merdzhanov (1876 - 1901), Bulgarian anarchist and founder of Gemidzhii group.

The group draws its roots from the Bulgarian anarchist movement which grew in the 1890s, and the territory of Principality of Bulgaria became a staging-point for anarchist activities against the Ottomans, particularly in support of Macedonian and Thracian liberation movements. The Boatmen of Thessaloniki was descended from a group founded in 1895 in Plovdiv and called "Macedonian Secret Revolutionary Committee", which was developed in 1898 in Geneva into a secret, anarchistic, brotherhood called "Geneva group". Its activists were the students Mihail Gerdzhikov, Petar Mandzhukov and Slavi Merdzhanov. They were influenced by the anarcho-nationalism, which emerged in Europe, following the French Revolution, going back at least to Russian anarchist Mikhail Bakunin and his involvement with the Pan-Slavic movement. The anarchists in the so-called "Geneva group" of students played key roles in the anti-Ottoman struggles. Nearly all of the members who founded the Committee in Geneva were natives from Bulgaria. Despite being of non-Macedonian descent, they espoused supranational Macedonian identity, emancipated from the pan-Bulgarian national project. Their motto was: No gods, no masters. The group established relations with Russian émigré circles, thus being close to followers of Bakunin. It also communicated with other anarchist circles through Geneva.

In 1899, Merdzhanov moved to the Bulgarian school in Thessaloniki, where he worked as teacher and sparked some of the graduates with anarchist ideas. In 1900, Petar Mandzhukov also resided in Thessaloniki, where had a contact with the Gemidzii and they were influenced by his anarchist ideas, especially those relating to methods of terrorist struggle. The first meetings of the group took part in 1899 with the purpose of forming a revolutionary terrorist group with aim of changing international public opinion in the matter of the freedom of Macedonia and Adrianople Thrace through urging the social conscience of the oppressed. The group is found in published works with several names: "The boatmen of Thessaloniki", the "Crew", or the "Gemidzhii", form of the Ottoman word for "boatman": gemici. At their start, they had a different name, the "Troublemakers", gürültücü. The name "boatmen" was due to "leaving behind the everyday life and the limits of law and sail with a boat in the free and wild seas of lawlessness." Their new slogan became "we will spend ourselves", i.e. we will die in the name of the freedom of the people.

== Attack plans and actions in Constantinople ==
At first the anarchists started to make plans for a bomb attack in Constantinople. In the summer of 1899, under the leadership of Slavi Merdzhanov the group planned the assassination of the Sultan. Merdzhanov, Petar Sokolov and their friend, the anarchist Petar Mandzhukov, approached Boris Sarafov, the leader of Supreme Macedonian-Adrianople Committee, and asked him for funds to finance large-scale terrorist activities in the main towns of the Ottoman Empire. He promised to provide money, and the three left for Constantinople, where after much discussion, they decided to assassinate the Sultan. In December of the same year Merdzhanov was connected by the secretary of the Bulgarian Exarchate Dimitar Lyapov with local Armenian revolutionaries. Here they established that even with the help of the Armenians it was impossible to do it. Quite early on, they decided that the effect of the explosion would be greater if there were parallel actions in other towns, and they consulted with Yordan Popyordanov, a member of a small terrorist group in Thessaloniki, who agreed to blow up the Thessaloniki branch of the Ottoman Bank. He enlisted the aid of a number of close friends. Thessaloniki terrorists were very young men, mostly from Veles, pupils in the Bulgarian High School. The Thessaloniki terrorist group called itself "the Gemidzhi" (from the Turkish word for "boatman", gemici). They planned to begin by blowing up the central offices of the Ottoman Bank in Thessaloniki and Constantinople. During 1900 Merdzhanov arrived again in Constantinople to discuss the plan with the Armenians, and afterward the terrorists started to work, digging tunnels in both places. On September 18, 1900, the Ottoman police apprehended a member of the group, who was carrying the explosives and later the whole group was arrested, including Merdzhanov, Sokolov and Pavel Shatev. The core was hastily disbanded for security and only Pingov stayed in Thessaloniki to prepare future activity. In 1901 the prisoners were deported το Bulgaria, after pressure from the Bulgarian government.

== Attack plans and actions in Adrianople ==
Merdzhanov and Sokolov went to Sofia and began to think up new ideas, one of which was to hold up the Orient Express on Ottoman territory near Adrianople, and to gain possession of the mail in order to finance future actions. In pursuit of this plan, they went to the Adrianople area in July 1901, with a cheta consisting of ten men, equipped with the help of Pavel Genadiev, the Supreme Macedonian Committee's representative in Plovdiv. The cheta managed to place a large quantity of dynamite on the railway line, but something went wrong, and the train passed undamaged. They learned then that the Persian Shah would pass through Adrianople by train, preparing to take him on the station at Lule Burgas, but failed. From there they headed to Adrianople with the intention of capturing the governor, who was the son-in-law of the Sultan, but failed again. After this failure, they kidnapped the son of a rich local Turkish landowner, but they were soon discovered and surrounded by large Turkish forces. In a battle which lasted several hours, most of the chetnitsi were killed or seriously wounded. Sokolov was among the dead, and Merdzhanov was captured alive, together with a Bulgarian from Lozengrad, and two Armenians. The captives were taken to Adrianople, where, in November 1901, all four were publicly hanged. The seizure of the dynamite arranged by Sarafov in Dedeagach resulted in the group confining its activity to Thessaloniki.

== Bombings in Thessaloniki ==
In 1900, the group had rented a shop across the Ottoman Bank in Thessaloniki and dug a tunnel to it, which was completed by 1903. On April 28, 1903, a member of the group, Pavel Shatev, used dynamite to blow up the French ship "Guadalquivir" which was leaving the Thessaloniki harbor. He left the ship together with the other passengers by lifeboat but was caught later by the Ottoman police at the Skopje train station due to a description by a boat crew member. The same night, other group bombers: Dimitar Mechev, Iliya Trachkov, and Milan Arsov, struck the railway between Thessaloniki and Constantinople, causing damage to the locomotive and some of the cars of a passing train without wounding any passengers.

The next day, the signal to begin the large raid in Thessaloniki was given by Kostadin Kirkov who used explosives to shut off the electricity and water supply systems of the city. Yordan Popyordanov (Orceto) blew up the building of an Ottoman Bank office, under which the "gemidzhii" had previously dug a tunnel. Milan Arsov exploded a bomb at the Alhambra Theater. The same night, Kostadin Kirkov, Iliya Trachkov and Vladimir Pingov detonated bombs in different parts of the city. Dimitar Mechev and Iliya Trachkov failed to blast the reservoir of a gas-producing plant. They were later killed in their quarters during a shoot-out with army and gendarmerie forces, against which Mechev and Trachkov used more than 60 bombs. Pingov was shot dead in an attempt to set fire to the Bosh-nyak Inn.

Yordan Popyordanov was killed on April 30 in a shoot-out with the army. In May, Kostadin Kirkov was killed by a sentry while trying to blow up a postal office. Right before being caught, Tsvetko Traykov, whose mission was to kill the local governor (vali), killed himself by setting off a bomb and then sitting on it.

== Related attacks in Burgas and Kuleliburgaz ==
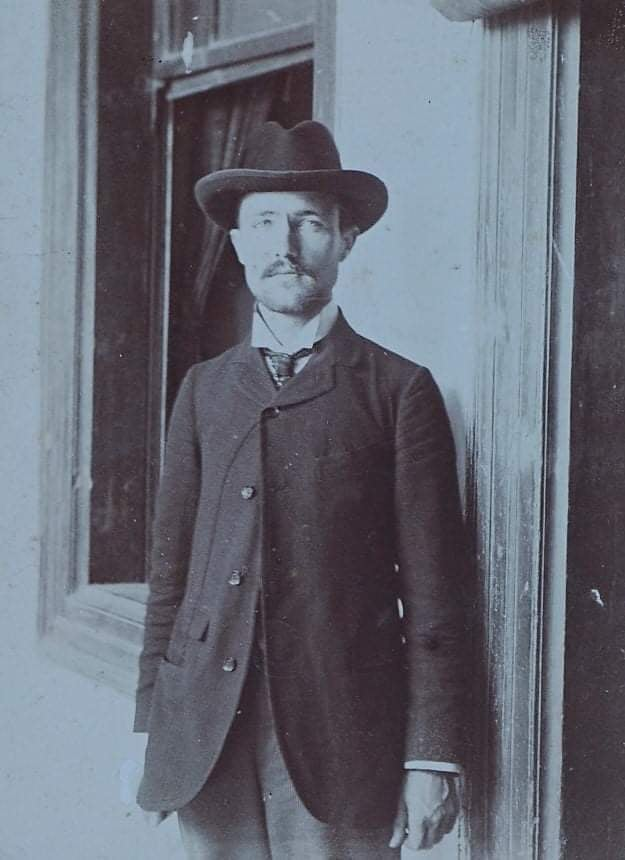
Pavel Shatev, one of the most notorious survivors from the group, was jailed in Communist Yugoslavia and died in home custody.

Continuation of the Thessaloniki bombings were the bombing in the same year of the passenger train near the railway station Kuleliburgaz led by Mihail Gerdzhikov and the bombing campaign of the passenger ship "Vaskapu" in the Burgas Bay led by Anton Prudkin, both organized by anarchists close to the Internal Macedonian-Adrianople Revolutionary Organization (IMARO). The daily express from Budapest to Constantinople was blown up near Kuleliburgaz on August 28. The explosion was intended to destroy a bridge and cut off the communication between Adrianople and Thessaloniki. Seven persons were killed and fifteen were injured. Two cars were smashed. The second terrorist act on the board of the Austro-Hungarian river- and sea- steamer Vaskapu occurred on September 2. The detonating of the ship, dates back to the time when the passenger traffic with ships between Danube river and the Black Sea ports was busy all the way to Constantinople. It killed the captain, two officers, six of the crew, and 15 passengers, and set fire to the vessel. The assailants - Ivan Stoyanov and Stefan Dimitrov, both close relatives of Zahari Stoyanov, also died by the explosion. It was planned to attack the port of Constantinople, with four ships being exploded there on September 9: besides "Vaskapu", these were the Austro-Hungarian "Apollo", the German "Tenedos" and the French "Felix Fressinet". Due to the premature explosion of "Vaskapu", the plan failed.

== Aftermath ==
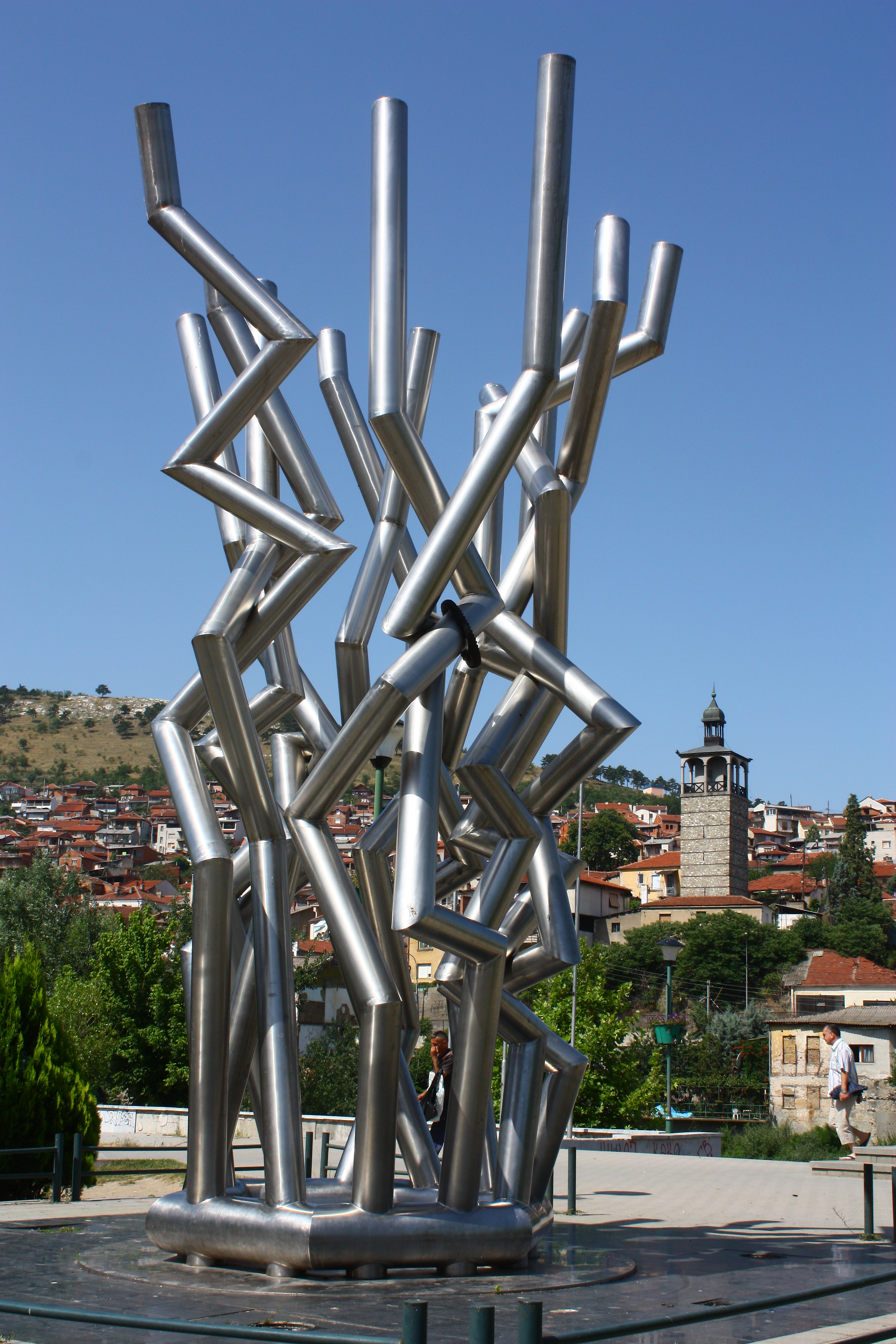
Abstract monument representing the Gemidzhii, in the center of Veles, North Macedonia

Vigilante reprisals against Christians were committed by the Muslim population in Thessaloniki and Bitola, with consular sources citing eleven Christian deaths in the latter. Ottoman forces increased their reprisals against IMORO. Per Bulgarian commercial agent Atanas Shopov, the Ottoman authorities killed more than 100 people and arrested more than 300 people, including principals and teachers in Bulgarian schools, 4 priests, 25 members of Bulgarian commercial families, 52 wealthy entrepreneurs, and many members of the artisan guilds, with most not being connected to the anarchist group or IMORO. Prominent Bulgarians in the countryside of Ottoman Macedonia continued to be arrested by the authorities for a month after the bombings, with more than 400 of them remaining in Thessaloniki prisons for months. Pavel Shatev, Marko Boshnakov, Georgi Bogdanov and Milan Arsov were sentenced to death by a Turkish court martial. Under Russian and Austro-Hungarian pressure, the death sentences were commuted to life sentences. They were sent to a penal colony in Fezzan. Members of the Central Committee of IMORO, including Ivan Garvanov, D. Mirchev and J. Kondov, were incarcerated. The attacks of the group were condemned in Europe.

In Libya, Boshnakov died from malaria on February 14, 1908, and Arsov from exhaustion on June 8, the same year. After July 30, 1908, because of the victory of the movement of the Young Turks, Ottoman amnesty was given to the two remaining "Boatmen".

== Members ==
The members of the group were as follows:

- Yordan Popyordanov, called Ortzeto, was born in 1881 in Veles. Considered the leader of the group from a bourgeois family and mixed with radical-revolutionary organizations after he entered the Thessaloniki Bulgarian School in 1894. He is thought to be the mastermind of the Boatmen. He was killed during the bombings and he is the only boatman from whom no picture is saved because he refused to be photographed on the grounds of not wanting to leave a memory of himself after death.
- Kostadin Kirkov, born in 1882 in Veles, bonded with Ortzeto from an early age. They entered the Bulgarian School at the same age. He was known for his great memory and sarcastic humor.
- Milan Arsov, born in 1886 in Oraovetz near Veles, was the youngest of the team and still at the 4th grade of school when the attacks were made. He died in exile.
- Dimitar Mechev, called Dime Mecheto, was born in 1870 in Veles. He joined IMARO and tried to kill a man from the local authority, who was sentenced the death by the Organization, with an axe in 1898. When he failed, he left for the mountains to join armed guerrilla groups. He later emigrated to the Principality of Bulgaria and worked in a mine in Pemik before joining the group. He died during the events.
- Georgi Bogdanov, born in 1882 in Veles, originated from a wealthy family. In 1901 his father sent him in Thessaloniki to work in a real estate office. As part of the Gemidzii he threw a bomb on the restaurant "Noja". Bogdanov was arrested and sent into exile in Libya. Following the Young Turk Revolution he was pardoned. Bogdanov died on June 12, 1939, in Sofia.
- Iliya Trachkov, born in 1885 in Veles and worked in Thessaloniki as a shoemaker. He died during the bombings.
- Vladimir Pingov, born in 1885 in Veles, was a "daredevil" and always took the most dangerous missions. He was the first member of the group who died.
- Marko Boshnakov, born in 1878 in Ohrid. It is said that he was an officer in the Bulgarian army and he was the one that made the plans for the tunnel under the Bank. He was the only one who did not take part in the bombings. He was caught 14 days after the bombings, exiled in 1908 and died in Fezan, Libya, in the same year.
- Tsvetko Traykov, born in 1878 in Resen and lived several years in Thessaloniki. He was an active member of the Bulgarian community. He was the last member of the group killed during the events.
- Pavel Shatev, born in 1882 in Kratovo into a wealthy merchant family. He got enrolled in the Bulgarian School in 1896. From 1910 until 1913 he lived in Thessaloniki and worked as a teacher in the Bulgarian Mercantile College. Shatev was jailed in Yugoslav Macedonia for his alleged pro-Bulgarian and anti-Yugoslav sympathies. He died in home custody in Bitola in 1951.

== Legacy ==
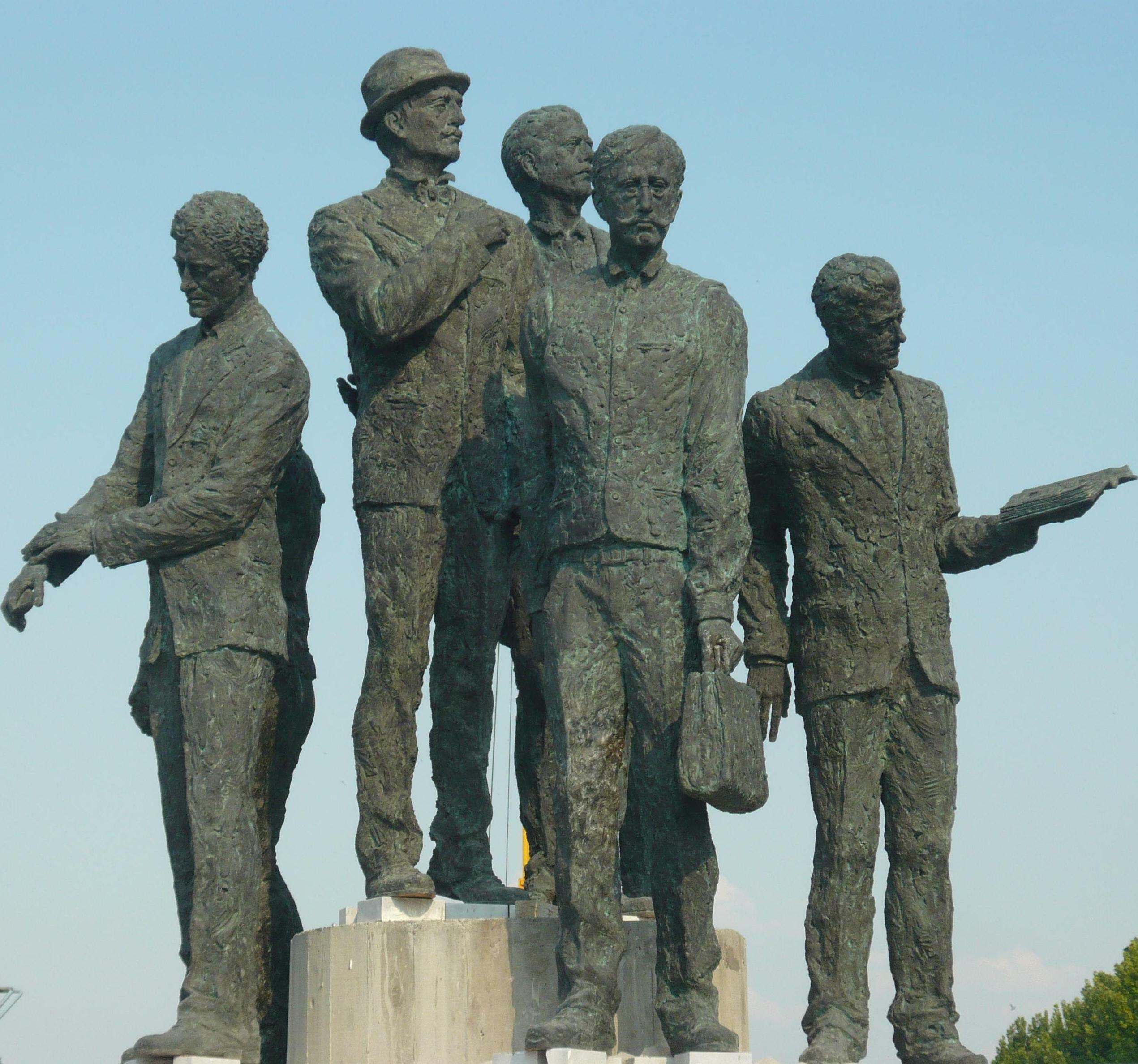
Monument in honor of the Gemidzhii, in the center of Skopje, North Macedonia

The Thessalonica assassination and the exiles in Fezzan, based on the memoirs of Pavel Shatev, was published in 1927 in Sofia by the Macedonian Scientific Institute. The story of the group was fictionalized in the 1930 novel Robi (Slaves) by the Bulgarian writer Anton Strashimirov, who was a former member of the IMARO. In Macedonia under slavery. The Thessalonica conspiracy (1903), a recollections of Pavel Shatev, was published in 1934 in Sofia by the IMRO revolutionary Peter Glushkov. In 1961, the Yugoslav production movie called The Salonika Terrorists was released in Yugoslav Macedonia, focusing on the struggle for independent Macedonia. In 1983, the writer Georgi Danailov (1936–2017) created the play "The Thessalonica conspirators", which is popular in the theaters in Bulgaria. Kosta Tsarnushanov (1903–1996), an activist of the MYSRO, wrote a documentary novel called Thessaloniki Assassins, which was published in Sofia in 1987. Other works about the group include the novels The Desert (Macedonian: Пустина) by Gjorgi Abadžiev, The Boatmen by Jovan Pavlovski, The Assassins of Thessaloniki (Macedonian: Солунските атентатори) by Jovan Boškovski, and the poem The Boatmen by Gane Todorovski. The Municipality of Veles constructed a monument by an iron bridge. As part of the project Skopje 2014, a monument was also erected in the center of Skopje, North Macedonia, in honor of the group.

== Gallery ==
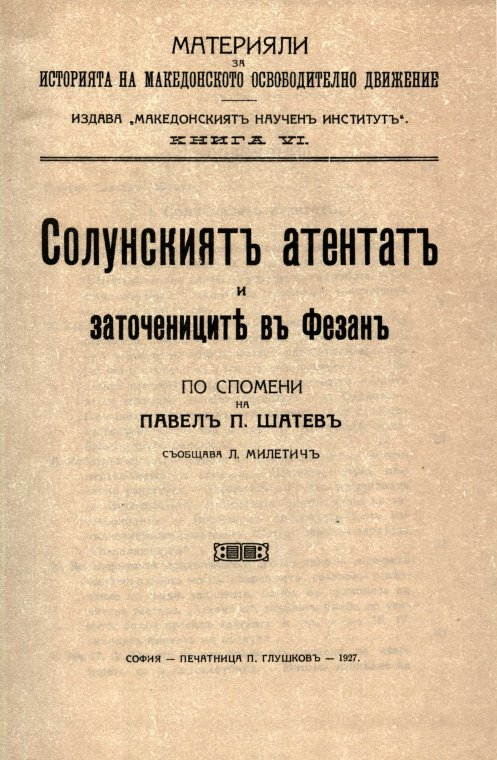
The Thessalonica assassination and the exiles in Fezzan, based on the memoirs of Pavel Shatev, published in 1927 in Sofia by the Macedonian Scientific Institute.

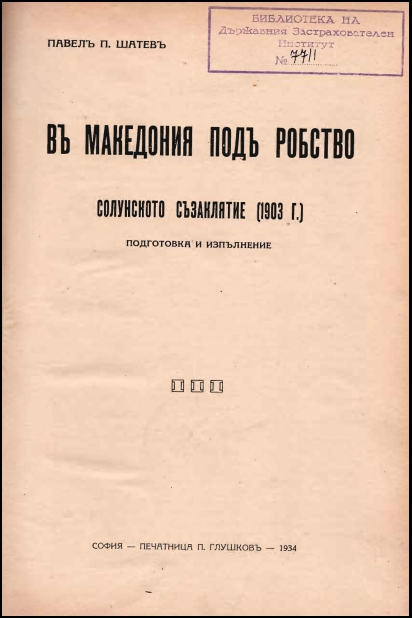
In Macedonia under slavery. The Thessalonica conspiracy (1903), authored by Pavel Shatev and published in 1934 in Sofia by the revolutionary Peter Glushkov

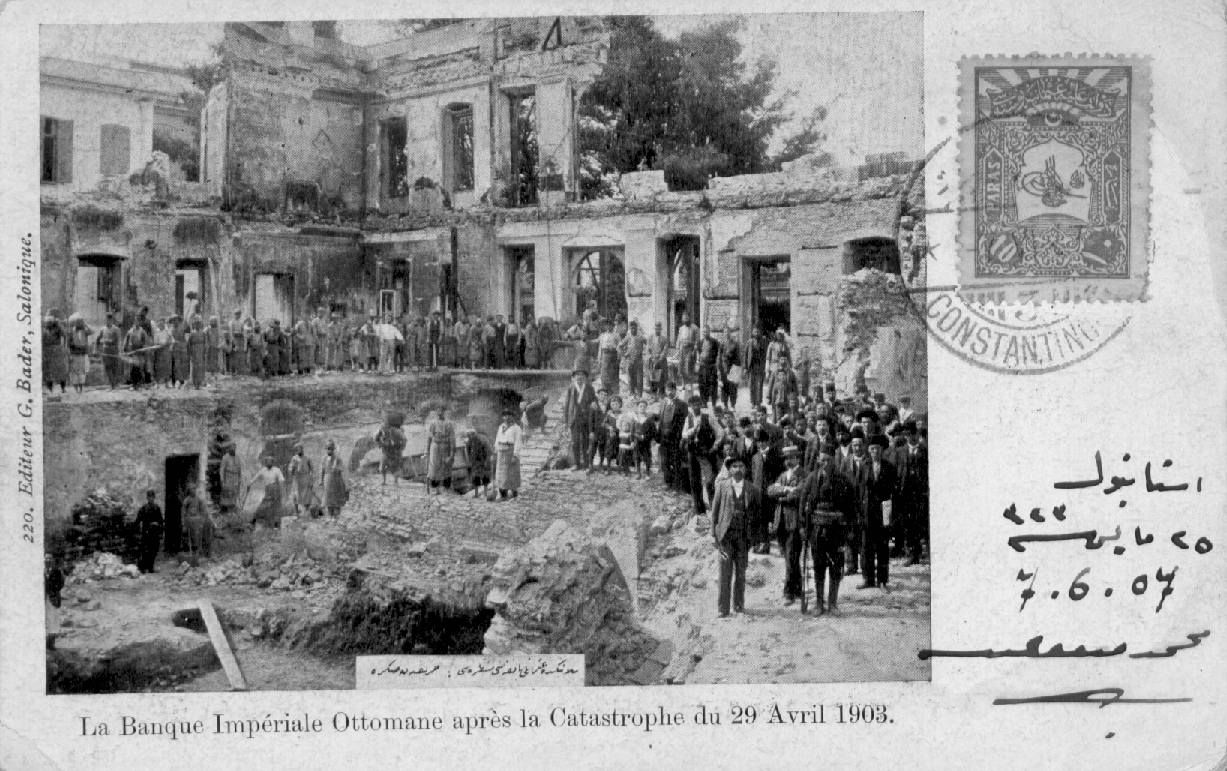
Depiction of the Ottoman Bank after explosion, April 1903

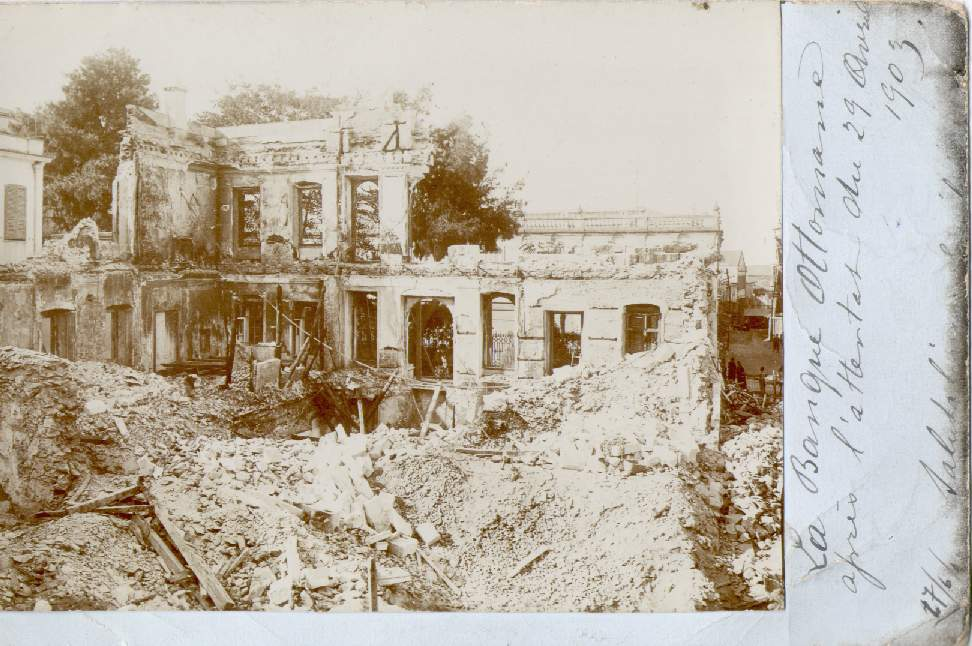
Aftermath of the destruction of the Ottoman Bank

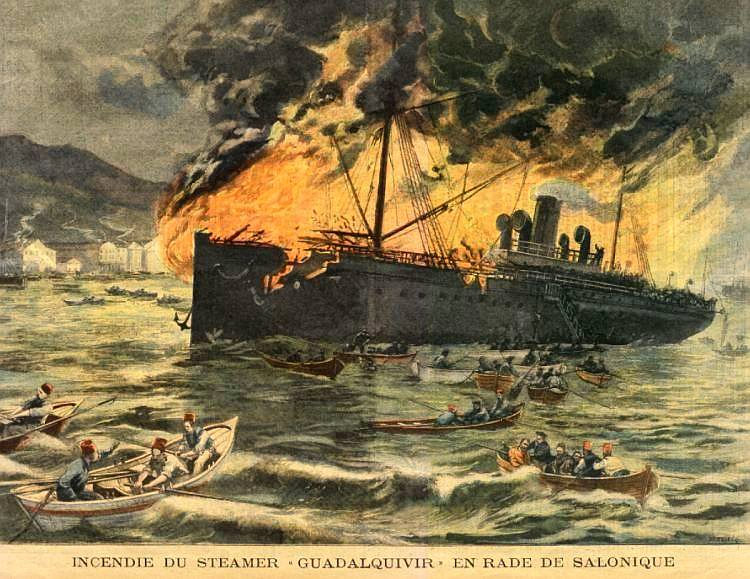
Depiction of the burning French ship "Guadalquivir"

== See also ==
- Anarchism in Bulgaria
- Macedonian Question
- Occupation of the Ottoman Bank (1896)
