= Georgi Bogdanov =

Bulgarian revolutionary (d. 1939)

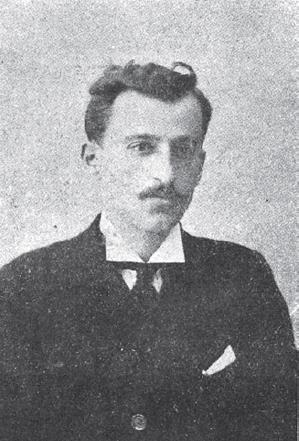
Georgi Bogdanov

Georgi Bogdanov (Bulgarian: Георги Богданов) was a Bulgarian anarchist and revolutionary. Bogdanov is best remembered as a member of the Gemidziite group and a participant in the 1903 Thessaloniki terror campaign. He is considered an ethnic Macedonian in North Macedonia.

== Biography ==
Georgi Bogdanov was born in Veles, in the Kosovo Vilayet of the Ottoman Empire (present-day North Macedonia). He finished primary school in his native town, and continued his education in Thessaloniki in the gymnasium "SS. Cyril and Methodius." In this high school he met with the anarchist group Gemidzhiite and became a member of it. As a part of the Gemidziite he participated in the 1903 Thessaloniki assassinations and threw a bomb on the restaurant Noja.

He is one of Gemidziite who had been arrested and was brought before a special military court and together with Pavel Shatev, Marko Boshnakov, and Milan Arsov was sentenced to death. Punishment would be waiting in Thessaloniki in prison along with other assassins but it was commuted to life imprisonment along with other survivors.

Bogdanov was later sent into exile in Africa. Following the Young Turk Revolution Bogdanov was pardoned along with Pavel Shatev and returned to Ottoman Macedonia. He brought with him the skulls of Milan Arsov and Marko Boshnakov.

After his liberation, he traded in Thessaloniki and Drama. In 1914 Bogdanov joined the Committee of Deserters in Bulgarian Army. On the occasion of the 15th anniversary of the Ilinden-Preobrazhenie uprising for the achievement of the Bulgarian idea in Macedonia, in 1918, Georgi Bogdanov was awarded the Order of Saint Alexander.

After the war with his family, he moved to Bulgaria, where he worked as a clerk. Bogdanov died on 12 June 1939, in Sofia.

== See also ==
- Internal Macedonian Revolutionary Organization (IMRO)
- Pavel Shatev
