= Macedonian Secret Revolutionary Committee =

Macedonian Secret Revolutionary Committee Македонски Таен Революционен Комитет
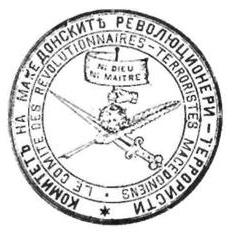
- Seal of the MTRK
- Abbreviation: MTRK
- Leader: Mihail Gerdzhikov
- Founded: 1895
- Dissolved: 1899
- Merged into: Internal Macedonian Adrianople Revolutionary Organization
- Headquarters: Geneva
- Ideology: Anarchism; Balkan federalism
- Political position: Far-left
- Slogan: No gods, no masters

The Macedonian Secret Revolutionary Committee (MSRC; Bulgarian: Македонски Таен Революционен Комитет, МТРК, romanized: Makedonski Taen Revolyutsionen Komitet, MTRK; Macedonian: Македонски Таен Револуционерен Комитет, МТРК, romanized: Makedonski Taen Revolucioneren Komitet, MTRK) was founded in 1895 (131 years ago) in Plovdiv. It was developed later in Geneva in a secret, anarchistic, brotherhood called "Geneva Group".

== History ==
The Bulgarian anarchist movement grew in the 1890s, and the territory of Principality of Bulgaria became a staging-point for anarchist activities against the Ottomans. Its activists were the students Michail Gerdjikov, Petar Mandjukov, Petar Sokolov, Slavi Merdjanov, Dimitar Ganchev, Konstantin Antonov and others. In 1893, they started in Plovdiv revolutionary activity as founders of the MSRC, which was proclaimed there in 1895. At the end of 1897, part of the group moved to Switzerland (Lozana and Geneva), where it made close connections with the revolutionary immigration and founded in 1898 the so-called Geneva Group, an external extension of MSRC. The organisation was under strong anarchist influence and rejected the nationalisms of the ethnic minorities of the Ottoman Empire, favouring the idea about a Balkan Federation. They proposed a "Macedonian state", which included also the Adrianople Vilajet (i.e. Macedonian-Thracian state) as part of the future Federation. They presumed that Bulgarian language, Bulgarian Church and Bulgarian education ought to be used there. However, the anarchists promoted the idea of the new state, for all the Macedonian "nationalities". Its members were to exert a significant influence on the development of the Macedonian and Thracian liberation movements. Between 1897 and 1898, two anarchist papers were published from Geneva - "Glas" and "Otmashtenie". In 1899, Gerdjikov came back to Sofia and met Gotse Delchev. As a result, he and his comrades joined the Internal Macedonian Adrianople Revolutionary Organization and the Supreme Macedonian-Adrianople Committee. Slavi Merdjanov moved to the Bulgarian school in Salonika, where he worked as teacher and sparked some of the graduates with this ideas. They became later the so-called Gemidzii.

The weakening of the Committee's center allowed some activists from the periphery of the movement, to attempt creating an alternative organization, which was however marginal. So on January 12, 1899, in Geneva on behalf of the self-proclaimed Macedonian Central Committee, Georgi Kapchev sent a call to convene an International Congress, which aimed to solve the Macedonian issue and to implement a program for the necessary reforms, but his attempt failed.

== Sources ==
- Списание „Анамнеза”, 1996, брой 2, Анархизмът в македоно–одринското национално-революционно движение: Солунските атентатори, Мариан Гяурски. In English: Magazine "Anamnesis", 1996, Issue 2, The anarchism in Macedonian and Thracian national revolutionary movement: The Thessaloniki bombers, Marian Giaourski.

== See also ==
- Thessaloniki bombings of 1903
- Bulgarian Revolutionary Central Committee
- Internal Revolutionary Organization
- Media related to Macedonian Secret Revolutionary Committee at Wikimedia Commons
