= Marko Boshnakov =

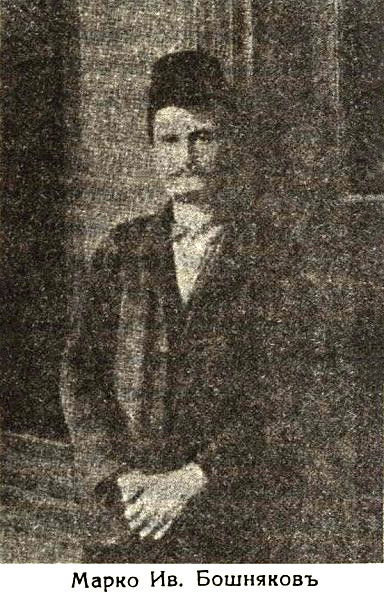
- Portrait of Marko Boshnakov
- Born: 1878; Ohrid, Manastir Vilayet, Ottoman Empire
- Died: 1908 (aged 29–30); Murzuk, Fezzan, Ottoman Empire

Marko Boshnakov (Bulgarian: Марко Бошнаков; 1878 – 1908) was a Bulgarian anarchist, participant in the Macedonian revolutionary movement and a member of the Gemidziite.

== Biography ==
Boshnakov was born in 1878 in Ohrid, Manastir Vilayet, Ottoman Macedonia. Later he became a member of Gemidziite while studying in the Bulgarian Men's High School of Thessaloniki and participated in the Thessaloniki assassinations.

He rented a shop on the opposite side of the Ottoman Bank in Thessaloniki, since there are foundations he dug a tunnel to the bank and he placed there dynamite. Later in that shop Jordan Popjordanov burned the fuze and bombed the Ottoman Bank. He is one of four Gemidzhii (Pavel Shatev, Georgi Bogdanov and Milan Arsov) who were arrested and brought before a special court.

All four were sentenced to death but his sentence was later commuted to life imprisonment. Marko Boshnakov died on 15 February 1908, in the Libyan province Fezzan. His skull was returned to Macedonia by Satev and Bogdanov. The remains of his skull were placed in a decorative wooden catafalque and buried in the cemetery in the church Sv. Virgin Perivlepta.

== See also ==
- Georgi Bogdanov
- Pavel Shatev
