= Petar Mandzhukov =

Bulgarian revolutionary (1876–1966)

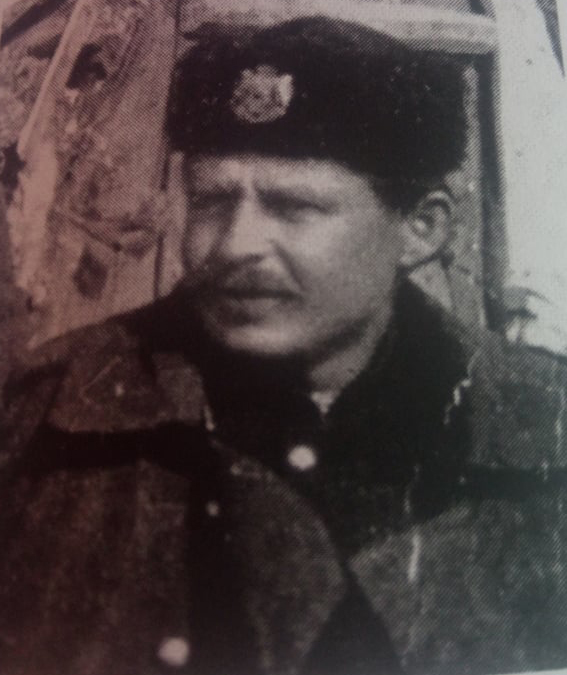
Petar Mandzhukov

Petar Georgiev Mandzhukov (Bulgarian: Петър Георгиев Манджуков; Macedonian: Петар Георгиев Манџуков; July 20, 1878 – January 1, 1966) was a Bulgarian anarchist, revolutionary and forester from the region of Macedonia. He was also a member of the Macedonian Secret Revolutionary Committee, Internal Macedonian-Adrianople Revolutionary Organization and the Supreme Macedonian-Adrianople Committee. Mandzhukov spent most of his life in Bulgaria.

== Biography ==
=== Early life and education ===
He was born on July 20, 1878, in the village of Mirkovci in the Ottoman Empire (modern North Macedonia). His brother was the Colonel of the Bulgarian Army Spas Mandzhukov. At the age of three, Mandzhukov was sent to the Principality of Bulgaria to live with the Bulgarian metropolitan Nathanael Kuchevishki, in Lovech. Mandzhukov was Nathanael's nephew as the son of his sister. Under his protection and guidance, he received his primary and secondary education. During his secondary education in Plovdiv in 1895, Mandzhukov came across Russian populist and nihilist literature, as well as European anarchist literature. These leftist theoretical publications greatly influenced him in the initial formation of his anarchist worldview. Together with his friend Mihail Gerdzhikov, Mandzhukov tried to apply the perceived anarchist theoretical basis in practice, creating the first anarchist circle in Plovdiv in 1895. In 1897, he translated the biography of the poet Semyon Nadson from Russian. Due to his anarchist views, he had to frequently move from city to city (mostly due to expulsions from schools), in order to complete his secondary education. Mandzhukov spent a year as a cadet at the Military School in Sofia, then continued his education at the gymnasium in Plovdiv, and completed his secondary education at the pedagogical schools in the cities of Kazanlak and Lom. In the latter two cities, he actively participated in the formation of anarchist circles.

At the end of May 1898, after finishing secondary school, he went to Geneva to study chemistry. However, instead of focusing on his studies at the university, he became a member of the anarchist Macedonian Secret Revolutionary Committee. When Mandzhukov arrived in Geneva, the group was experiencing a crisis and was on the verge of disintegration. However, in its further survival, he started compiling and publishing the newspaper Odmazda (Revenge), in which he authored the article Balkan Confederation. He left Switzerland in the second half of September 1898. Mandzhukov managed to translate the brochure The Transgressions of God by Sebastian Fobe from French to Bulgarian, and the brochure The Word by Émile Henry from Russian to Bulgarian. He gave these translations to Gotse Delchev, who he met for the first time in Plovdiv in 1898. Afterwards, he returned to Ottoman Macedonia with the task of organizing an anarchist circle at the Skopje Pedagogical School. Mandzhukov managed to create an anarchist circle in Skopje, whose members were primarily people from Veles and students of the Skopje Pedagogical School. In an attempt to illegally cross the Ottoman-Bulgarian border, he was arrested. Mandzhukov was imprisoned in the Skopje prison Kuršumli An. Sentenced in March 1899 to life imprisonment for conspiracy, Mandzhukov appealed the sentence and in April of the same year, the court, after reviewing his case, acquitted him due to lack of evidence.

=== Revolutionary activity ===
After his release, in May 1899, Mandzhukov re-established contact with his friend in Sofia, Slavi Merdzhanov. He found out from Merdzhanov that an anarchist circle had also been formed in Salonika, mostly composed of people of Veles from the upper classes of the Bulgarian Men's High School of Thessaloniki. As early as June 1899, Mandzhukov became a member of Delchev's detachment, spending the period from mid-June to mid-October 1899 in it. In 1899 Mandzhukov, Slavi Merdzhanov, and Petar Sokolov approached Boris Sarafov, who was then leader of the Supreme Macedonian-Adrianople Committee (SMAC), and asked him to fund large-scale terrorist activities in the main cities of European Turkey. He promised to provide money. Towards the end of 1899, the three went to Constantinople, where they decided to assassinate the Sultan. However, this proved to be impossible, since Abdul Hamid infrequently went outside of the Yıldız Palace, which was heavily guarded, and when he did, his route was never known in advance and the public was kept distanced. After realizing that their mission was impossible, they decided to blow up the headquarters of the Ottoman Bank in Constantinople. They rented an establishment opposite the bank, disguising it as a printing store, and began to dig a tunnel which would enable them to place explosives against the foundations of the bank. They also consulted with Yordan Popyordanov, part of the Boatmen of Thessaloniki, who agreed to blow up the Salonika branch of the Ottoman Bank, and who was also assisted by close friends from his native Veles. Through their contact with Mandzhukov, the Boatmen had been influenced by anarchist ideas, especially those relating to methods of struggle. Along with the Boatmen, they worked on the tunnels. While working on the tunnels, they had difficulties obtaining dynamite. An Armenian revolutionary agreed to smuggle some dynamite into Constantinople from the Caucasus, but the shipment was discovered by the Ottomans and he was arrested. Mandzhukov was arrested along with his associates. They were extradited to Bulgaria after the intervention of the Bulgarian diplomatic representative Ivan Geshov.

After their arrest and release, Mandzhukov became a member of SMAC. In September 1901, Mandzhukov, as the leader of a small detachment, attempted to free Merdzhanov from the prison in Edirne, by capturing the Orient Express. The attempt failed and Merdzhanov was hanged. Although he was against the beginning of a mass uprising, he accepted the proposed tactics of Gotse Delchev and Gyorche Petrov for partial guerrilla warfare with organized attacks on key geostrategic positions. Mandzhukov, together with the Boatmen, was actively involved in securing money to purchase the dynamite needed to blow up the Salonika branch of the Ottoman Bank. Although he did not directly participate in the Thessaloniki bombings, he did secure the explosive material for them. He actively participated in the organization of two partially successful attacks: one on the Junction-Salonika railway (at the Kuleli Burgaz station), and the second on a Hungarian ship sailing in the Black Sea. The goal of Mandzhukov was to prevent the arrival of Ottoman soldiers. With a new detachment, Mandzhukov set out to destroy the Yeniköy-Xanthi railway line in order to prevent the transfer of Ottoman soldiers to Thessaloniki after the outbreak of the Ilinden–Preobrazhenie Uprising. The vigilance of the Ottoman railway guards thwarted this attempt. At the end of 1903, near Karlukovo, Mandzhukov read in the newspapers about the Thessaloniki bombings, the deaths of hundreds of innocent people and the bombers, among whom were his closest friends. After the uprising, Mandzhukov committed a murder on the order of the Supreme Committee. The victim was a Turk, who terrorized the Bulgarian population in the region. A new order followed, this time for the murder of a Bulgarian. Mandzhukov then reconsidered his role in this organization, alien to his anarchist views and cut his ties with the Supreme Committee.

=== Forestry ===
Mandzhukov withdrew from revolutionary activity. He professionally decided on afforestation. He became one of the first Bulgarian foresters. In 1904, he began working on the initial organization of the service for flood support and afforestation in Kazanlak. The service was established by the French water inspector Felix Luis-Mari Vogeli in cooperation with the Austrian forester Paul Schäger. On Vogeli's recommendation, Mandzhukov was sent in 1907 as a Bulgarian scholarship holder to study forestry at the University of Nancy, France. In 1909, with the acquired degree in water and forest engineering, he returned to Bulgaria and continued to work as a forester. In 1911, after the departure of Vogeli from Bulgaria, he took his place and at the same time continued his activities in Kazanlak. He participated in the Bulgarian Army during the Balkan Wars and in the First World War. Mandzhukov, together with Gerdzhikov, was among the founders of the Federation of Anarcho-Communists in Bulgaria in 1919. After the First World War, Mandzhukov continued to work on afforestation and organized the services in Karlovo, Plovdiv and Razlog, and in 1921 he founded the regional forest inspection in the city of Stara Zagora. In the late 1920s, he settled in Plovdiv. From 1922 to 1935 and from 1937 until his retirement, Mandzhukov worked in a private forestry practice for the measurement and organization of municipal and other social forests. He organized the afforestation of Stara Planina, the forests of Kazanlak, Karlovo, Asenovgrad and Razlog. Due to his contribution, Mandzhukov was awarded the Order of Labor by the Bulgarian state. In April 1945, Mandzhukov, through his friend Pavel Shatev, sent his Report on the Forestry Question in Macedonia to the Presidium of the Anti-fascist Assembly for the National Liberation of Macedonia. In 1947, the assistant to the Minister of Agriculture and Forestry of the People's Republic of Macedonia invited Mandzhukov to come and help organize the afforestation. Because of Mandzhukov's close contacts with Alekso Martulkov and Atanas Mitrev (Yugoslav Macedonian officials at the time), an intensive correspondence ensued, both between them and with the Yugoslav diplomatic mission in Sofia and the Bulgarian Communist Party's branch in Plovdiv to secure a passport for Mandzhukov. During this period, Mandzhukov was actively preparing to form his own team of foresters in Bulgaria for the upcoming engagement in PR Macedonia. However, the Tito–Stalin split prevented this engagement. In 1961 he was invited by Mitko Zafirovski, the director of the National and University Library in Skopje during the 1960s, to visit PR Macedonia. However, due to his advanced age, housing problems and other circumstances, he was unable to come. Mandzhukov died in Plovdiv on January 1, 1966.

== Works and views ==
Mandzukov was an anarchist and an opponent to the ruling Ottoman absolutist system. He did not believe in the form of the state as a social organization. In the 1890s, Mandzhukov began to propagate individual terror as a means of the liberation struggle. Mandzhukov accepted individual actions (known in the anarchist terminology as "propaganda of the deed") as a way of acting, and he later applied them in the Ottoman Empire. He published the Alphabet of Anarchist Teaching in 1898 in Skopje. Its basic idea was centered on the primacy of freedom, where economic, spiritual, and political freedom were regarded as inseparable. Mandzhukov rejected any form of state organization as based on the thirst for power natural to humans and practiced through systematic violence. He proposed instead an anarchist social organization based on mutual respect. While he supported the cause of Macedonian autonomy and independence, and regarded the use of revolutionary violence as legitimate, he rejected the structure of the Internal Macedonian-Adrianople Revolutionary Organization as too centralized. In the brochure, he deconstructed the role of the state and especially the actions of "the church, the school, the courts, the barracks – in general, all state institutions" and all other state creations which control human life. He wrote that "anarchism aims to unite individuals in a community – group, communal, national and universal – not through violence and subjugation, not through relations between masters and slaves, but through voluntary, free agreement between free and equal in dignity."

He began writing his memoirs titled Harbingers of the Storm in 1946 and finished them in 1959. The work depicts the life and struggles of him and his friends during the period 1895-1903. His work titled Skopska Crna Gora – biographical notes was written during the 1950s. Mandzhukov sent these works to Zafirovski. He also sent the following works: Ada-Kale (Memoirs), The First World War – a historical essay and The Beginning of Afforestation and Protection from Torrents in Bulgaria. Through his anarchist interpretation, he emphasized the absurdity and destructiveness of the First World War (as well as any war in general) due to the loss of lives and material resources. Mandzhukov also pointed to the military institution of the state and the state itself as the main culprits. He was under the dominant influence of the works by the anarchists Mikhail Bakunin, Pierre-Joseph Proudhon and Peter Kropotkin.

== Legacy ==
His entire work is deposited in Plovdiv's archive. His manuscript "The Odyssey of the First" was published in 1974. His work Skopska Crna Gora – biographical notes was translated from Bulgarian into Macedonian by the Macedonian writer Sotir Gulevski, at the initiative of Zafirovski. Harbingers of the Storm was first published in 1993 by the writer Nikolay Haytov in Bulgaria. In 1997 and 1999, his memoirs Harbingers of the Storm were translated from Bulgarian into Macedonian by Vančo Meandžiski. In 2013 the Federation of Bulgarian Anarchists republished Mandzhukov's memoirs. Two collections were published by the State Archives of the Republic of North Macedonia: Petar Mandžukov (1878 ‒ 1966): Anarchist and Critic of a Contemporary (publications and letters) in 2019 and Petar Mandžukov (1878 ‒ 1966) and His Anarchist Worldview (short stories, publications and letters) in 2020. In the courtyard of the Museum of Afforestation in Shipka, a bust honoring him exists alongside the bust of his mentor Vogeli.
