= Pokrovnik =

Pokrovnik may refer to:

- Pokrovnik, Bulgaria, a village near Blagoevgrad
- Pokrovnik, Croatia, a village near Drniš
