= Ganchev =

Ganchev is a Bulgarian surname. Notable people with the surname include:

- Aleksandar Ganchev (born 2001), Bulgarian footballer
- Dimitar Ganchev (1875–1912), Bulgarian revolutionary
- Grisha Ganchev (born 1962), Bulgarian businessman and oligarch
- Ivko Ganchev (born 1965), Bulgarian football goalkeeper
- Vitaly Ganchev (born 1975), Ukrainian-Russian police officer and politician
