= Metodi Aleksiev =

Bulgarian revolutionary

Voivode Metodi Aleksiev
- Методи Алексиев Янушев
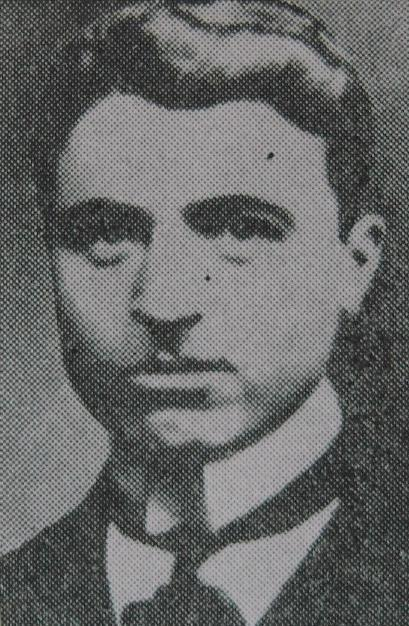
- Born: Metodi Aleksiev Yanushev; 27 September 1887; Köprülü, Kosovo Vilayet, Ottoman Empire (now Veles, Republic of North Macedonia)
- Died: February 1924 (aged 36); Pokrovnik, Tsardom of Bulgaria
- Education: Bulgarian Men's High School of Thessaloniki; Bulgarian Pedagogical School of Serres
- Military career
- Allegiance: IMRO; Kingdom of Bulgaria
- Branch: Bulgarian Army
- Units: Cheta of Yane Sandanski; Macedonian-Adrianopolitan Volunteer Corps
- Conflicts: Macedonian Struggle; Balkan Wars; First Balkan War; Bulgarian front; Second Balkan War; World War I; Macedonian front; September Uprising
- Other work: Teacher; Member of the Bulgarian Workers' Social Democratic Party; Member of the Bulgarian Communist Party

Metodi Aleksiev Yanushev (Bulgarian: Методи Алексиев Янушев) was a Bulgarian revolutionary, a member of the Internal Macedonian-Adrianople Revolutionary Organization (IMARO) and the Bulgarian Communist Party.

== Biography ==
Metodi Aleksiev Yanushev was born in 1887 in Köprülü (now known as Veles), in the Kosovo Vilayet of the Ottoman Empire (present-day Republic of North Macedonia). He studied in the Bulgarian Men's High School of Thessaloniki and became a member of the IMARO. He was wanted by the authorities and in 1906 he moved to Ser to study in the Bulgarian Pedagogical School. He became an Komitadji and entered the revolutionary band of Gorna Dzhumaya, and later he was in the headquarters of Yane Sandanski's revolutionary band.

In 1908, after the Young Turk Revolution, he became a teacher. In 1912, after the beginning of the Balkan Wars, he was a leader of a revolutionary band that helped the actions of the Bulgarian army in the regions of Razlog and Drama.

In 1913 he entered the Bulgarian Workers' Social Democratic Party. During the First World War he served in the 29th Infantry Regiment and participated in the Radomir Rebellion in 1918. From 1920 to 1923 he had been a member of the Regional committee of the Bulgarian Communist Party in Gorna Dzhumaya. He commanded a rebel band during the September Uprising. He was taken hostage by the band of Aleko Vasilev and later released.

He continued with communist activity and was killed in September 1924 in the vicinity of the village of Pokrovnik.
