= Slavi Merdzhanov =

Bulgarian revolutionary (1876–1901)

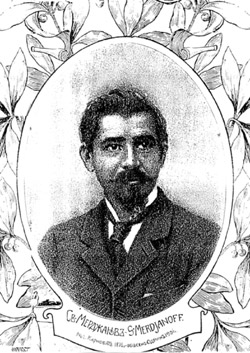
Svetoslav Merdzhanov (1876–1901), Bulgarian anarchist and founder of Gemidzhii group.

Svetoslav Chanev Merdzanov (1876–1901) was a Bulgarian anarchist and revolutionary. He was better known as Slave or Slavi Merdzhanov. Merdzhanov was founder of the group called the Gemidzii, which organized the Thessaloniki bombings of 1903.

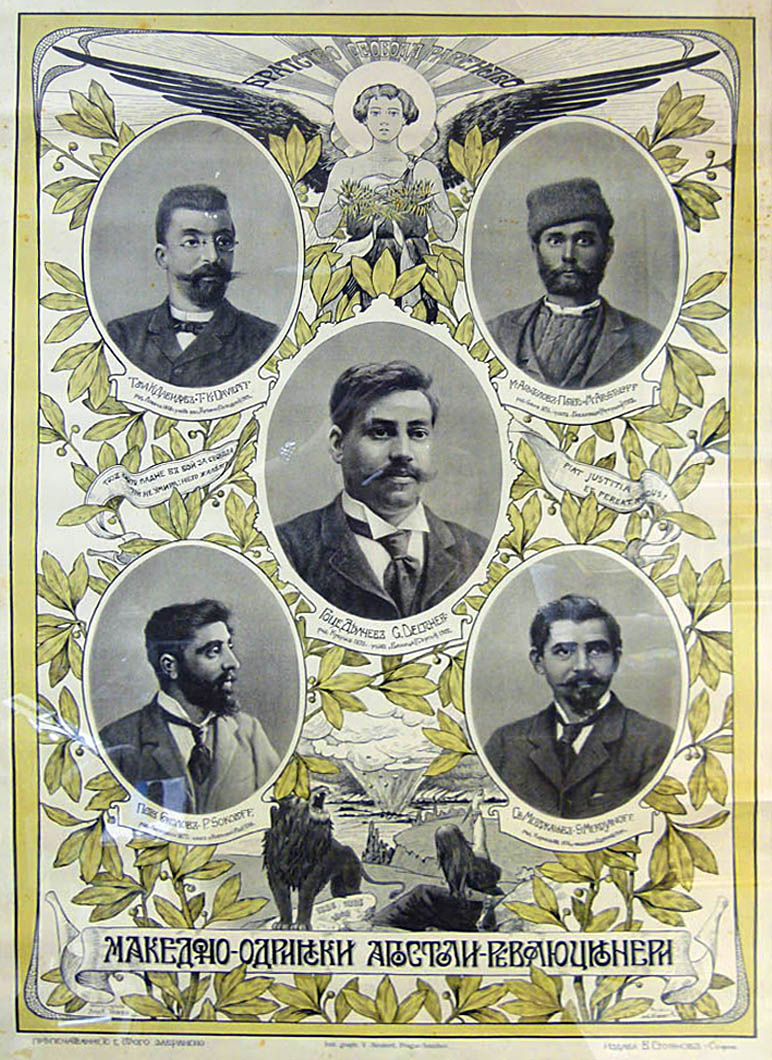
Memorial poster of IMARO issued after the Young Turk Revolution. The group presents Gotse Delchev and his comrades: Toma Davidov, Mihail Apostolov, Petar Sokolov and Slavi Merdzhanov.

== Biography ==
He was born on 16 July 1876 in Karnobat, then part of the Ottoman Empire. While he was still studying at the Ruse High school, thanks to the influence of the libertarian Varban Kilifarski, he joined the anarchist group of this city on the Danube and so did not finish high education. After working for a time in a notary, he went to Geneva (Switzerland) to study law, but became here part of the anarchist "Geneve group", founded in 1898 by Petar Mandjukov and closely related to the Internal Macedonian-Adrianople Revolutionary Organization (IMARO). Following his decision to devote himself to the struggle for the liberation of Macedonia and Thrace from Ottoman rule, he went in 1899 to Skopje where, after some time, he was arrested by the authorities and thrown in prison. Later he moved to Thessalonica where he met Yordan Shurkov whom he knew from Plovdiv. Shurkov was teacher at the Bulgarian Men's High School of Thessaloniki. He introduced Merdzhanov at the school, where he also began to work as a teacher. Through Shurkov he met the Veles group. The Veles group, as it turned out, was ripe for becoming involved in the revolution. Merdzhanov sparked some of the Veles graduates with this ideas. The first meetings of the group took part with the purpose of forming a revolutionary circle with aim of changing international public opinion in the matter of the freedom of Macedonia and Adrianople Thrace.

Subsequently, in 1899, Merdzhanov with Mandjukov and Petar Sokolov, was part of the guerrilla group of Gotse Delchev, and become a member of the IMARO. This group acted in the mountainous areas of Pirin. In 1900 he arrived in Istanbul where Merdzanov created the anarcho-terrorist group and with Pavel Shatev, Mandjukov and Sokolov participated in the preparation of blasting of the Ottoman Imperial Bank's central office, for which they dig a tunnel. This group also prepared an attack against Sultan Abdul Hamid II. The plan was discussed with a members of the Armenian Revolutionary Federation. In September 1900 the Ottoman police apprehended a member of the group, and later the whole group was arrested. In 1901 the prisoners were deported το Bulgaria, after pressure from the Bulgarian government. Merdzanov and Sokolov went to Sofia and began to think up new ideas. One of which was to hold up the Orient Express on Turkish territory near Adrianople, and to gain possession of the mail in order to finance future actions. In July 1901 he formed a new terrorist group with the participation of Armenian revolutionaries and left in the area of Adrianople. After kidnapping Nuri Bey, the only son of Dertli Mustafa Bey, a rich owner of Adrianopole, the group had an armed confrontation with the Ottoman army, Sokolov and two other members of the group were killed, as well as Nuri Bey. Merdzjanov was captured alive, together with another Bulgarian and two Armenians. The captives were taken to Adrianople. After terrible torture, the survivors were condemned to death. Slave Merdzanov, and his comrades, were hanged on 27 November 1901 in Adrianople.
