= Milan Arsov =

Bulgarian revolutionary

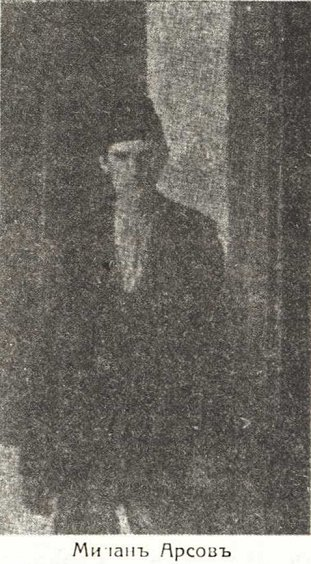
- Born: 1884; Oraovec, Ottoman Empire
- Died: 1908 (aged 23–24); Murzuk, Fezzan, Ottoman Empire

Milan Arsov (Bulgarian: Милан Арсов) was a Bulgarian revolutionary, anarchist and a member of Boatmen of Thessaloniki (Gemidzhii).

== Biography ==
Milan Arsov was born in Oraovec, in the Kosovo vilayet of the Ottoman Empire (present-day North Macedonia). He studied in the Bulgarian gymnasium in Thessaloniki "Sts. Cyril and Methodius" and Bitola Bulgarian Exarchate gymnasium but did not graduate.

He joined the anarchist brotherhood in Thessaloniki called Gemidzhii. As such he participated in assassinations in Salonika in 1903. On 15 April 1903 Dimitar Mechev, Ilija Trachkov and Milan Arsov detonated the railway line Thessaloniki - Istanbul. The blast damaged several cars and the locomotive, but the passengers were not hurt. The next day Arsov threw a bomb in front of the hotel "Alhambra". Arsov was one of four survivors from the Gemidzhii, who were put on trial by a military court. Along with Pavel Shatev, Georgi Bogdanov, and Marko Boshnakov they were sentenced to death, but his sentence was commuted to life imprisonment and he along with other assassins had been sent to Fezzan in Sahara.

He died of tuberculosis on 8 June 1908 in Murzuk, but his skull was returned to Macedonia by Pavel Shatev and Georgi Bogdanov.

== See also ==
- Pavel Shatev
- Georgi Bogdanov
- Marko Boshnakov
