= Konstantin Antonov =

Konstantin Antonov Sechkata
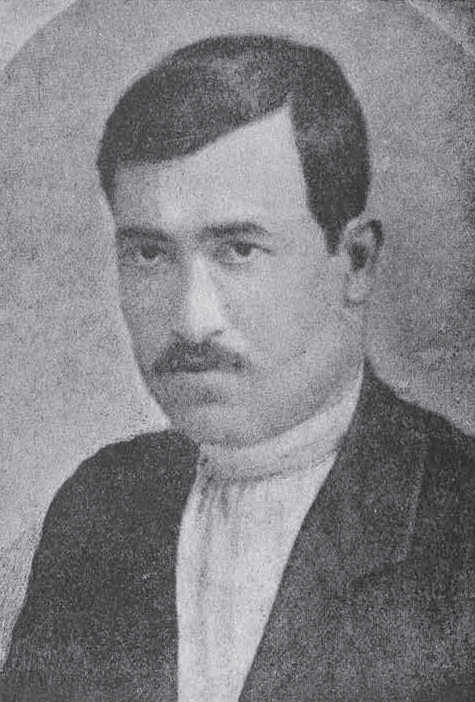
- Born: 18 June 1879; Stara Zagora, Ottoman Empire
- Died: 23 October 1932 (aged 53); Stara Zagora, Bulgaria
- Organization(s): SMAC, IMARO, Bulgarian Communist Party

Konstantin Antonov Ivanov (Bulgarian: Константин Антонов Иванов), nicknamed Sechenkata (Bulgarian: Сеченката), and also known under the name Valcho Antonov, was a Bulgarian revolutionary, a member of the Supreme Macedonian-Adrianople Committee, the Internal Macedonian-Adrianople Revolutionary Organization (IMARO) and the Bulgarian Communist Party.

== Biography ==
Konstantin Ivanov was born in Stara Zagora in 1879. His father was a local revolutionary worker. He studied in the Plovdiv Gymnasium, where he was influenced by the representative of the Geneve group, Dimo Nikolov, to accept the socialist ideas. He went to Lyubimets with Nikolov to get acquainted with the conditions in the Odrin Vilayet. There he met Pavel Genadiev, who attracted him to the revolutionary cause. Genadiev managed to appoint Ivanov teacher in Aharkyoy, Odrin region. He became a member of the Odrin regional revolutionary committee of the Internal Macedonian-Adrianople Revolutionary Organization (IMARO) and founded committees in Aharkyoy and the neighbouring villages – Kemal, Dogandzha, Kaikkyoy, Haskyoy, Fikel, Vazgash, Hadzhikyoy and others. However, Konstantin Antonov was forced to escape to Odrin and later to Bulgaria because of betrayal which happened in the village of Kemal.

From February 1901 to 1902, he was a leader of the Supreme Macedonian-Adrianople Committee (SMAC) border point in Chepelare, where he was supported by the local teacher Tota Doncheva. There he started using the name Valcho, in memory of the previous leader of the border point, Valcho Sarafov, who was a cousin of Boris Sarafov. In Chepelare, Antonov applied unscrupulous methods of terror as a result of which a few members of the organization were killed, and many other members suffered from betrayal. The revolutionary cause was in general seriously shaken. According to Hristo Karamandzhukov:

He was healthy and physically tough and possessed extraordinary spiritual qualities – a strong mind, intelligence, energy and courage. But he was an extreme and vivid socialist, he hid in him deep hatred toward contemporary society and statehood and believed, that the Marxist theories could be applied on the grounds on which the Macedonian-Adrianople revolutionary movement was based and to the conditions of the region of the Middle Rhodopes. Having this in mind, as well as his wild and fervent character and temper, his suspicion of the others, and his spirit as a whole, it can be explained why he, striving to create a healthy and compact organization, embraced the terror, as the most important instrument for work and creation and because, after all, the organization weakened...

On the Plovdiv Congress of the Odrin revolutionary region in 1902, he was chosen a traveling member of the Odrin regional revolutionary committee and he was appointed leader of the West Thrace revolutionary region. The same year in August, he created a revolutionary band in Haskovo, in which were included Tane Nikolov, Dimitar Zapryanov, Stefan Cholakov, Dyado Petar and others, and entered Thrace with this band. In 1904, he went to Odessa, where he established close relations with the local socialists. In 1904 he married Tota Doncheva and in the beginning of 1905 he went with her to Skopje, where they formed a socialist group under the mask of their tailoring activity. However, they were revealed to the authorities and expelled outside the borders of the Ottoman Empire.

During the Balkan Wars, he was a volunteer of the Macedonian-Adrianopolitan Volunteer Corps and served in the revolutionary band of Nikola Zhekoolu, and later in the Third company of the Third Thessalonica Battalion. During 1924-1925, he joined the Military organization of the Bulgarian Communist Party in the region of Stara Zagora. In 1928 he was among the founders of the Workers' Party in Stara Zagora. He died in 1932 after he was beaten by the police.
