= Dimitar Ganchev =

Bulgarian revolutionary (1875–1912)

- Димитър Ганчев
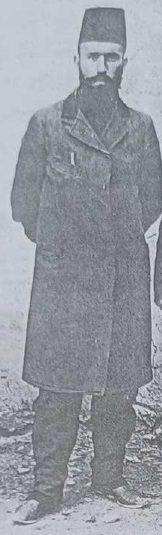
- Born: 21 March 1875; Ruse, Ottoman Empire
- Died: 17 October 1912 (aged 37); Bunarhisar, Ottoman Empire
- Organization: IMARO

Dimitar Ganchev (Bulgarian: Димитър Ганчев; 1875–1912) was a Bulgarian revolutionary and teacher. An anarchist member of the Internal Macedonian-Adrianople Revolutionary Organization (IMARO), he was one of the organisers of the Ilinden–Preobrazhenie Uprising and arrested for his part in it. He was later killed while fighting in the battle of Bunarhisar.

== Biography ==
Dimitar Ganchev was born on 21 March 1875, in the Bulgarian city of Ruse, which was then under the rule of the Ottoman Empire. After graduating from school in Ruse, he went abroad to study the natural sciences at the University of Geneva, in Switzerland. In 1897, he became a member of the so-called Geneva group – an anarchistic revolutionary circle led by Mihail Gerdzhikov and Petar Mandzhukov. He moved to Skopje, where he worked as a teacher and joined the Internal Macedonian-Adrianople Revolutionary Organization (IMARO).

In early 1903, he was elected as a delegate to the Solun congress, which decided to carry out an armed uprising against the Ottomans. According to Lazar Dimitrov, Ganchev was in favour of the uprising. Ganchev then disguised himself and went into hiding in the village of Dolno Sonje, where he organised a rebellion against the Ottoman Gendarmerie. Ganchev was arrested and imprisoned in Skopie on either 28 April or 7 June 1903. He was sentenced to life imprisonment, under article 58 of the Bulgarian criminal code. In 1904 he was released from prison, under an amnesty procured by the Bulgarian government, and later became a teacher in Razgrad.

With the outbreak of the First Balkan War, Ganchev enlisted in the Bulgarian Army as a volunteer. On 17 October 1912, he was killed in the battle of Bunarhisar.
