= Pythio railway station =

Railway station in Greece

Πύθιο Pythio
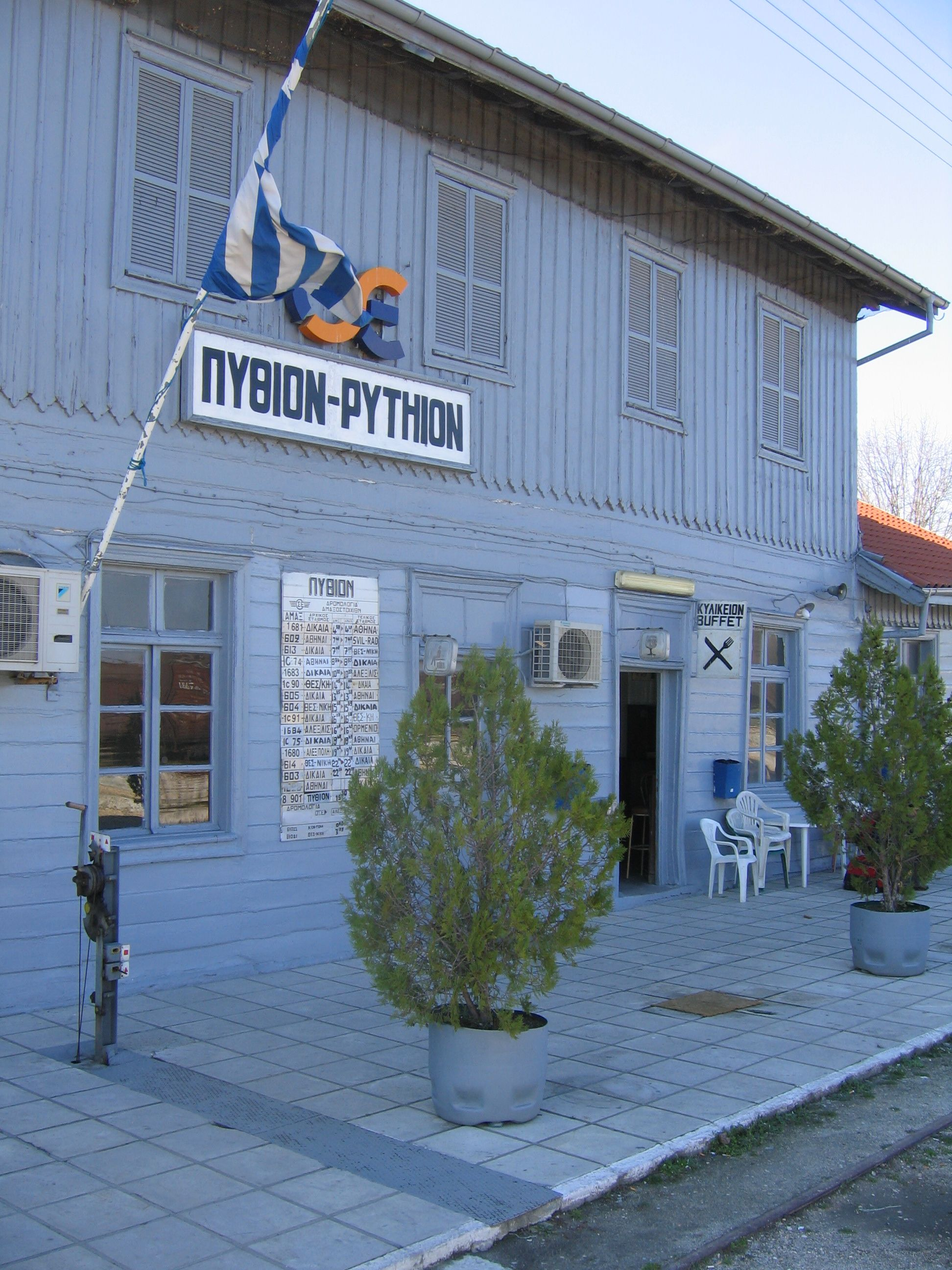
- The station building, March 2007

General information
- Location: Pythio; Evros; Greece
- Coordinates: 41°22′13″N 26°37′19″E
- Owner: GAIAOSE
- Lines: Alexandroupolis–Svilengrad railway; Istanbul–Pythio railway
- Platforms: 4
- Tracks: 6 (2 disused)
- Train operators: Hellenic Train

Construction
- Structure type: at-grade
- Platform levels: 1
- Cycle facilities: No

Other information
- Status: Unstaffed
- Website: http://www.ose.gr/en/

History
- Opened: 1873
- Electrified: No
- Former names: Kuleliburgaz

Services
Preceding station	Hellenic Train	Following station
Petrades towards Alexandroupoli	G6 Alexandroupoli-Ormenio	Pythion Halt towards Ormenio
Former services
Preceding station	Turkish State Railways	Following station
Alexandroupolis towards Thessaloniki	Friendship Express	Uzunköprü towards Istanbul
Location
- Location within Greece

Pythio railway station (Greek: Σιδηροδρομικός Σταθμός Πυθίου, romanized: Sidirodromikós stathmós Pythíou) is a railway station that serves the village of Pythio in Evros in Eastern Macedonia and Thrace, Greece. It is at the junction where the railway to Ormenio and Bulgaria branches off the main line from Thessaloniki to Istanbul through Alexandroupolis and Uzunköprü. Located southeast of the village of Pythio, it is unstaffed, however there are waiting rooms available, if in a dilapidated state. The station is the final stop in Greece before crossing the border into Turkey. There is another railway stop closer to the village, Στάση Πυθίου ("Pythio halt").

== History ==
The station lies on the line, built by the Chemins de fer Orientaux (CO) from Istanbul to Vienna. The railway reached Pythio, known as Kuleliburgaz during Ottoman rule, in 1873, when the line from Istanbul to Edirne and Bulgaria was opened. A 112 kilometres (70 mi) branch from Pythio to Alexandroupolis (then known as Dedeağaç) was opened in 1874.

When the railway was built, it was all within the Ottoman Empire. During World War I, the railway was an important link for the transportation of troops and equipment, as the Ottoman Empire, Bulgaria, and Austria-Hungary were all Central Allies. On 14 December 1916 Allied, aircrafe bombed the bridge over the river Evros near Pythio (Kuleliburgaz). Under the Treaty of Lausanne of 1923, a new border between Greece and Turkey was established at the Evros river, just east of Pythio, which had the result that the railway from Istanbul to Bulgaria entered Greece at Pythio, then re-entered Turkey at Edirne (Karaağaç railway station), re-entered Greece at Marasia, and finally entered Bulgaria between Ormenio and Svilengrad. This arrangement continued until 1971, when two new lines were opened.

During the occupation (and especially during German withdrawal in 1944), the network was severely damaged by both the German army and Greek resistance groups. The track and rolling stock replacement took time following the civil war, with normal service levels resumed around 1948. In 1970 OSE became the legal successor to the SEK, taking over responsibilities for most of Greece's rail infrastructure. On 1 January 1971, the station and most of the Greek rail infrastructure was transferred to the Hellenic Railways Organisation S.A., a state-owned corporation. Freight traffic declined sharply when the state-imposed monopoly of OSE for the transport of agricultural products and fertilisers ended in the early 1990s. Many small stations of the network with little passenger traffic were closed down. That same year in Turkey, the Edirne Cut-off was opened to allow trains from Istanbul to Bulgaria to run through Edirne entirely on Turkish territory so that trains such as the Orient Express no longer had to stop at Pythio. In Greece, a line was opened to allow trains from Pythio to Bulgaria to stay on Greek territory and avoid Edirne. In the 1990s, OSE introduced the InterCity service to the Alexandroupolis–Svilengrad line Which reduced travel times across the whole line.

In 2001 the infrastructure element of OSE was created, known as GAIAOSE; it would henceforth be responsible for the maintenance of stations, bridges and other elements of the network, as well as the leasing and the sale of railway assists. In 2005, TrainOSE was created as a brand within OSE to concentrate on rail services and passenger interface. In 2009, with the Greek debt crisis unfolding OSE's Management was forced to reduce services across the network. Timetables were cutback and routes closed, as the government-run entity attempted to reduce overheads.On 11 February 2011, all cross border routes were closed and international services (to Istanbul, Sofia, etc.) were ended. Services to/from Ormenio were replaced by bus. In 2014 TrainOSE replaced services to/from Dikaia with buses

In 2014 TrainOSE replaced services to/from Dikaia with buses In 2017 OSE's passenger transport sector was privatised as TrainOSE, currently, a wholly owned subsidiary of Ferrovie dello Stato Italiane infrastructure, including stations, remained under the control of OSE. In 2019 services were suspended due to a landslide. In September 2022, regular crossbourder transport resumed

In 2017 the building was designated as a building of architectural importance.

Following the Tempi crash, Hellenic Train announced rail replacement bus's on certain routes across the Greek rail network, starting 15 March 2023.

In August 2025, the Greek Ministry of Infrastructure and Transport confirmed the creation of a new body, Greek Railways (Greek: Σιδηρόδρομοι Ελλάδος, romanized: Ellinikí Sidiródromi Monoprósopi) to assume responsibility for rail infrastructure, planning, modernisation projects, and rolling stock across Greece. Previously, these functions were divided among several state-owned entities: OSE, which managed infrastructure; ERGOSÉ, responsible for modernisation projects; and GAIAOSÉ, which owned stations, buildings, and rolling stock. OSE had overseen both infrastructure and operations until its vertical separation in 2005. Rail safety has been identified as a key priority. The merger follows the July approval of a Parliamentary Bill to restructure the national railway system, a direct response to the Tempi accident of February 2023, in which 43 people died after a head-on collision.

== Facilities ==
The station buildings are a beautiful example of late 19th-century railway architecture In September 2022, regular cross-border transport resumed The buildings neglected for years have been upgraded and restored, with disabled access at platform level.

== Services ==
Pythio is the first European Union railway station for trains from Turkey and passengers from the East. As of 2020, the station is only served by one daily pair of regional trains Alexandroupolis–Ormenio

Between July 2005 and February 2011 the Friendship Express, (an international InterCity train jointly operated by the Turkish State Railways (TCDD) and TrainOSE linking Istanbul's Sirkeci station, Turkey and Thessaloniki, Greece) made scheduled stops at passed through Pythio, with trains changing locomotives and crew at the station.

As of October 2024 all services are run as a rail-replacement bus service.

== Popular culture ==
The station can be found in the 1957 novel From Russia With Love, the fifth novel by the English author Ian Fleming:

Hot coffee from the meagre little buffet at Pithion, (there would be no restaurant car until midday), a painless visit from the Greek customs and passport control, and then the berths were folded away as the train hurried south towards the Gulf of Enez at the head of the Aegean.

— Ian Fleming, From Russia, with Love, Author's note

The spelling of the station, differs in the book to real life. However like in the novel, station is still housed in its original building, with a small buffet on site and remains the only cross-border rail route between Greece and Turkey. However the Orient Express no longer calls or passes through the station.
