= Petrades =

Petrades Πετράδες
- Community
- Location within Greece
- Coordinates: 41°20′48″N 26°36′42″E
- Country: Greece
- Administrative region: Eastern Macedonia and Thrace
- Regional unit: Evros
- Municipality: Didymoteicho
- Municipal unit: Didymoteicho

Population (2021)
  - Community: 139
- Time zone: UTC+2 (EET)
  - Summer (DST): UTC+3 (EEST)

Petrades (Greek: Πετράδες) is a village near the easternmost point of mainland Greece. Since 1997, it is part of the municipality of Didymoteicho. It is located south of the community of Pythio. Turkey is to the south and to the east. Forests are along the riverbed and farmlands are along Petrades. It is accessed by a road linking Greek National Road 51 near Didymoteicho with Pythio. The community was affected by the floods of Evros which lasted from February 17 to March 8, 2005.

== Etymology ==
"Petrades" is the modern Greek name of the village. Although earlier variations of the name for the settlement aren't accessibly recorded, the name was used as early as 1878 by Alexandre Syvnet in a table compiled of villages and inhabitants of the Ottoman Empire, which was made under orders of the Sultan. The name is also used by Stamatis V. Psaltis in the Eastern Inspectorate of Athens in 1884, suggesting it was widely used by both the Turks and Greeks. The village also has a Turkish name "Taşçıarnavut köy" although lesser used.

Both the village's Greek name "Petrades" and Turkish name "Taşçıarnavut köy" reflect the trade of the Petradiotes: stonemasonry. The Greek name was likely derived from the Greek word "πέτρα" (stone). The Turkish name is related to the words "taşçı" (stonemason, stone craftsmen, quarryman), "arnavaut" (arnaout, mercenary warrior during Byzantine & Ottoman periods, today means Albanian), and "köy" (village).

== Geography ==
s

=== Climate ===
Climate data for Petrades, Evros, Greece (2024-2025)
Month	Jan	Feb	Mar	Apr	May	Jun	Jul	Aug	Sep	Oct	Nov	Dec	Year
Mean daily maximum °C (°F)	8 (46)	7 (45)	15 (59)	17 (63)	21 (70)	31 (88)	37 (99)	36 (97)	27 (81)	21 (70)	12 (54)	7 (45)	20 (68)
Mean daily minimum °C (°F)	0 (32)	−2 (28)	4 (39)	5 (41)	8 (46)	15 (59)	17 (63)	18 (64)	13 (55)	8 (46)	3 (37)	0 (32)	7 (45)
Average precipitation mm (inches)	38.76 (1.53)	12.82 (0.50)	78.24 (3.08)	75.14 (2.96)	137.64 (5.42)	19.82 (0.78)	10.92 (0.43)	28.9 (1.14)	77.61 (3.06)	1.65 (0.06)	43.46 (1.71)	85.19 (3.35)	610.15 (24.02)
Source: World Weather Online.

== See also ==
- List of settlements in the Evros regional unit
