= Veles, North Macedonia =

Town in central North Macedonia

Veles Велес (Macedonian)
- Town
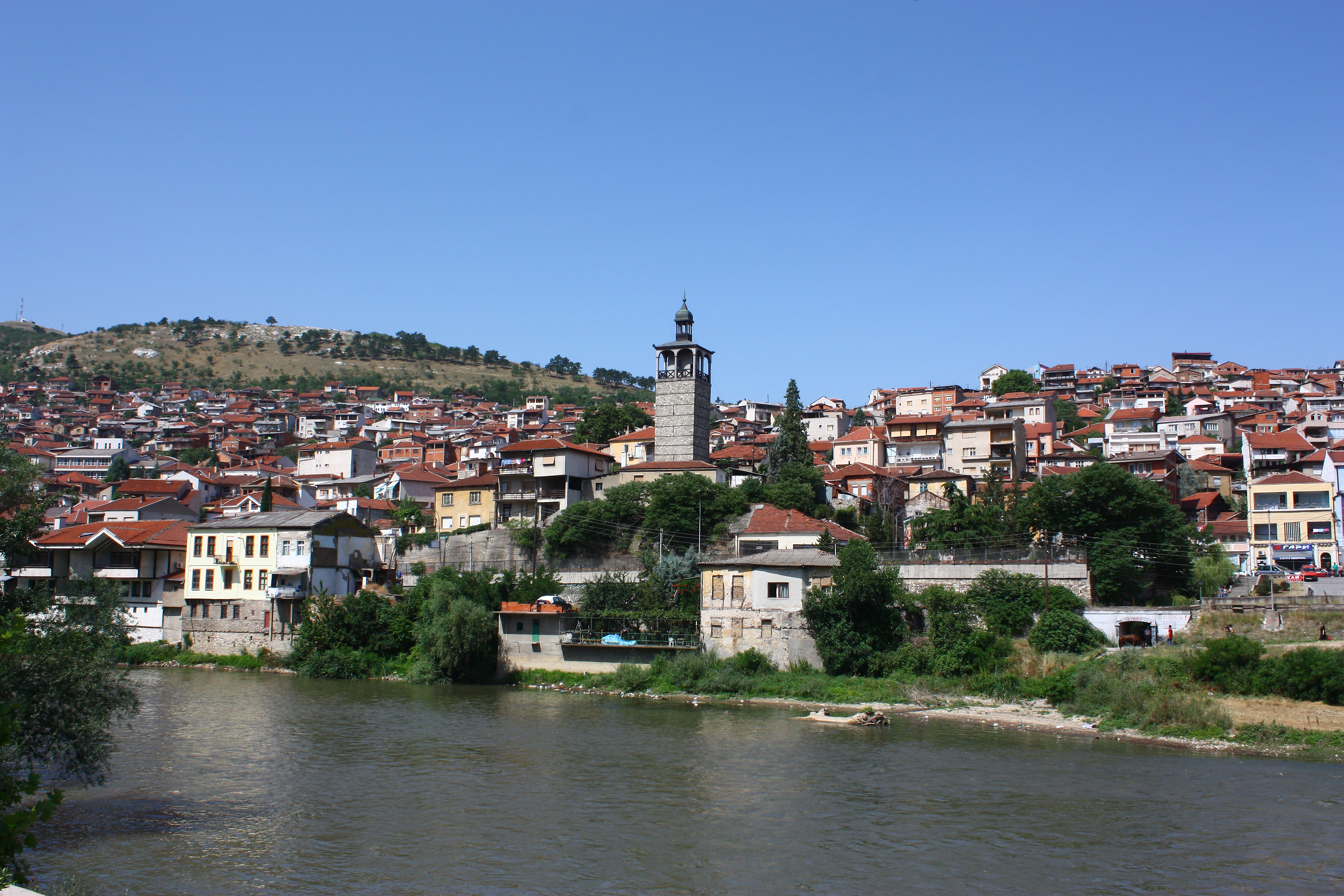
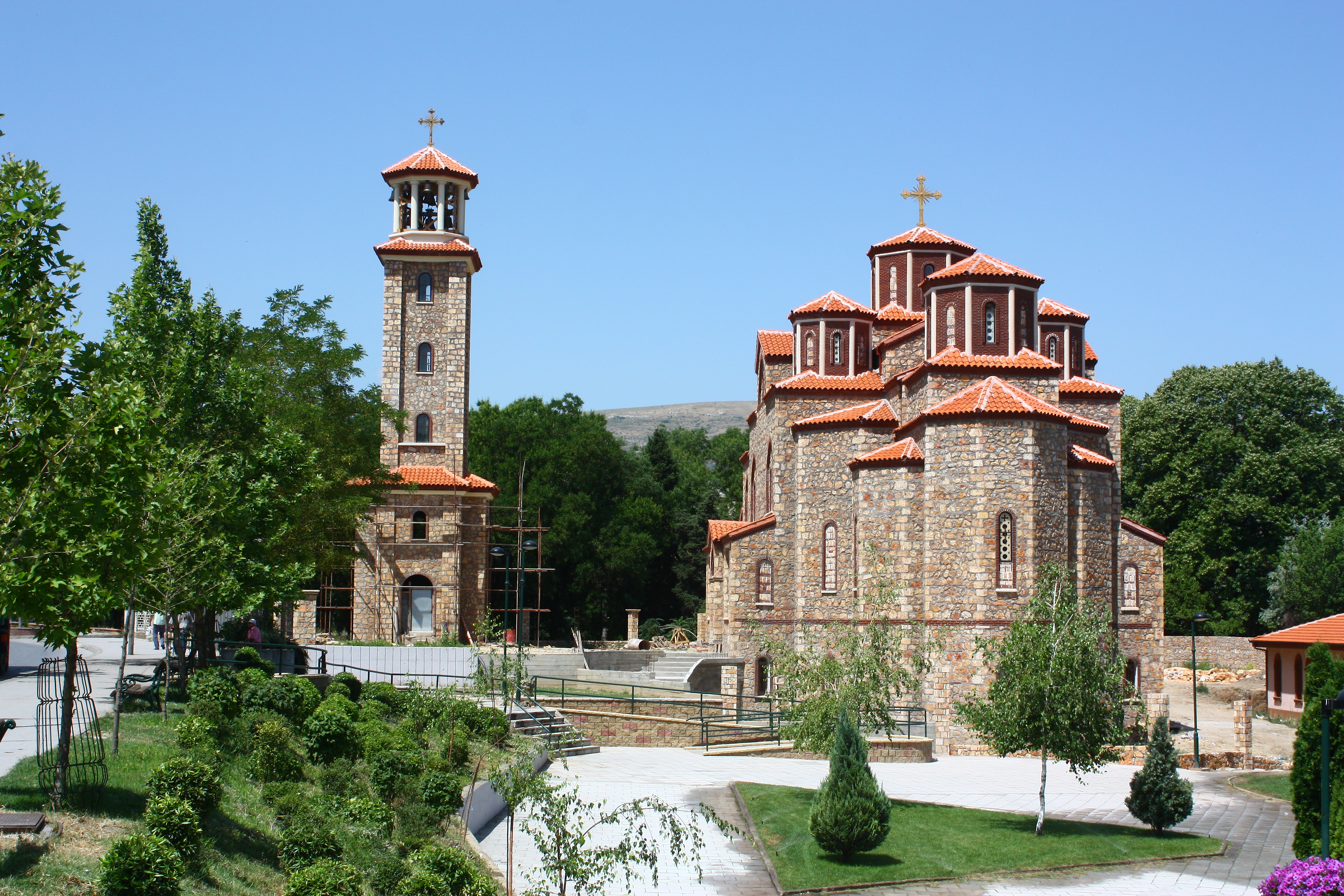
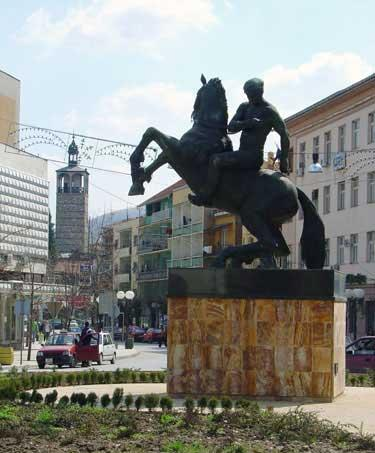
- From the top, View of Veles from across the Vardar River, Sts. Cyril and Methodius Church, Statue of Ilindentzi

- Flag Seal

- Location within North Macedonia
- Coordinates: 41°43′12″N 21°47′36″E
- Country: North Macedonia
- Region: Vardar
- Municipality: Veles

Government
  - Mayor: Marko Kolev (VMRO-DPMNE)

Population (2021)
  - Total: 40,664
- Demonym: Veleshanec/Veleshanka
- Time zone: UTC+1 (CET)
  - Summer (DST): UTC+2 (CEST)
- Postal code: 1400
- Area code: +389 043
- Vehicle registration: VE
- Website: www.Veles.gov.mk/

Veles (Macedonian: Велес [ˈvɛlɛs]) is a city in the central part of North Macedonia on the Vardar river. The city of Veles is the seat of Veles Municipality. Veles is the seventh largest Macedonian city with a total population of 40,664 (census 2021). The largest cities in the proximity of Veles are: Skopje – the capital and the largest city of North Macedonia – 54 km in the northwest direction, Štip 43 km to the east, Sveti Nikole 34 km to the northeast, Prilep 79 km in the southwest direction, and Kavadarci and Negotino 43 km and 40 km respectively to the southeast. Veles is on the crossroad of important international road and rail lines. For all these reasons, Veles is considered to have a good geolocation within North Macedonia.

== Names ==
Throughout the history Veles had many names, out of which three are most important. Vilazora was initially the Paeonian city Bylazora from the period of early Classical Antiquity. The city's name was Βελισσός Velissos in Ancient Greek. Later in the history, as part of the Ottoman Empire it became a township (kaza) called Köprülü in the Üsküp sanjak (one of the administrative divisions of the Ottoman Empire). After the Ottoman rule, from 1389 to 1912, Veles was part of the Vardar Banovina of the Kingdom of Yugoslavia. After World War II, the city was known as Titov Veles after Yugoslavian president Josip Broz Tito, but the 'Titov' was removed in 1996.

In Aromanian, the city is known as Velis.

== History ==
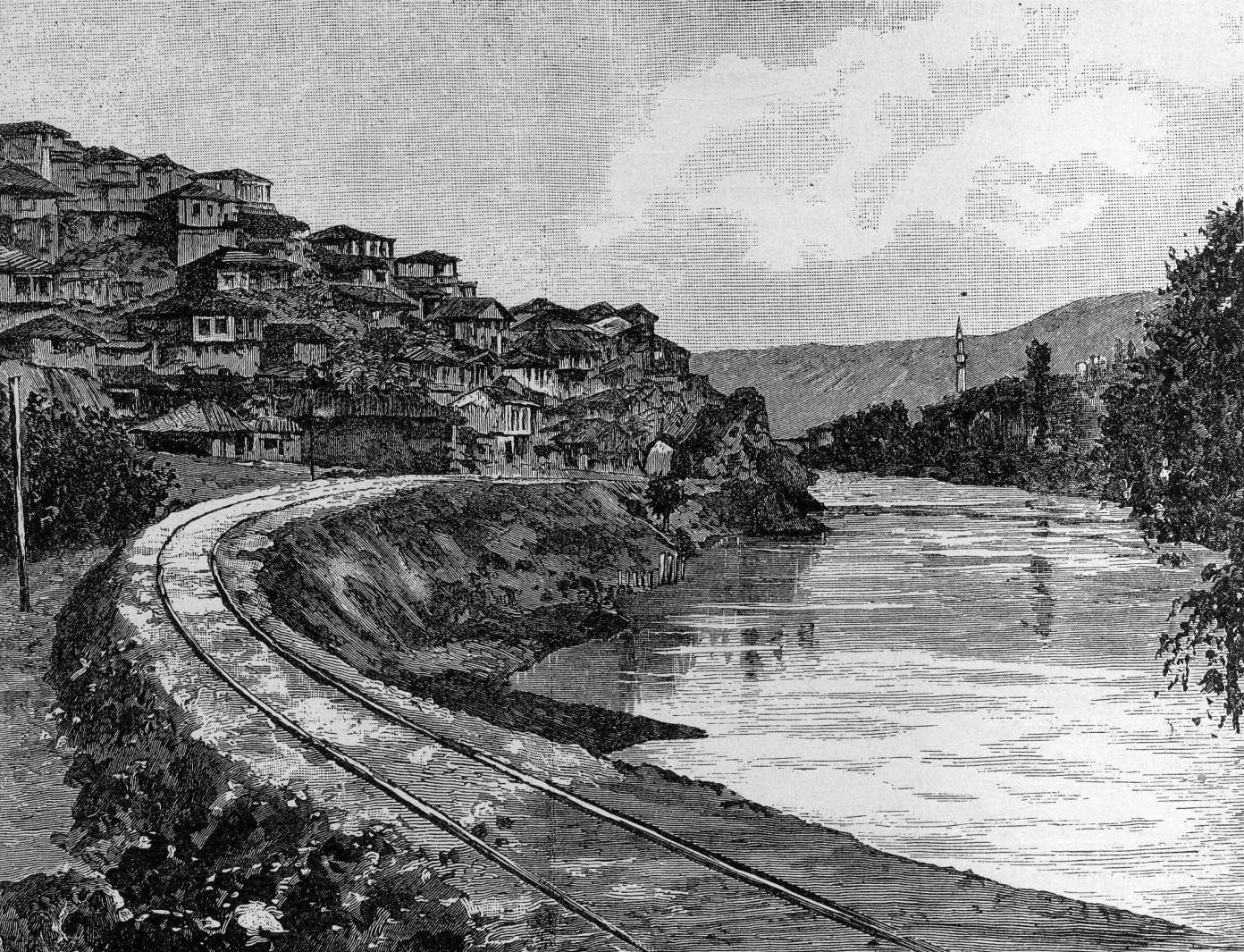
Veles in the 19th century

The area of present-day Veles has been inhabited for over a millennium. In antiquity, it was most likey a settlement close to the Paionian capital Bylazora, and contained a substantial population of Thracians and Illyrians. It was then part for centuries of the Roman Empire, Eastern Roman Empire, and at times the First and Second Bulgarian Empire. It became part of the Kingdom of Serbia at the beginning of the 14th century, while during the Serbian Empire (1345–71) it was an estate of Jovan Oliver and subsequently the Mrnjavčević family until Ottoman annexation after the Battle of Kosovo (1389). Before the First Balkan War, it was a township (kaza) with the name Köprülü, part of the Sanjak of Üsküp. In the end of the 18th century and beginning of the 19th century it was part of the semi independent Albanian Pashalik of Shkodra.

During the Great Eastern Crisis, the local Bulgarian movement of the day was defeated when armed Bulgarian groups were repelled by the League of Prizren, an Albanian organisation opposing Bulgarian geopolitical aims in areas like Köprülü that contained an Albanian population. According to the statistics of Bulgarian ethnographer Vasil Kanchov from 1900, 19,700 inhabitants lived in Veles, 12,000 Bulgarian Christians, 6,600 Turks, 600 Romani and 500 Aromanians.

In 1905 Dimitar Mishev Brancoff gathered statistics about the Christian population of Macedonia, in which the Christian population of Veles appears as consisting of 13,816 Bulgarian Exarchists, 56 Bulgarian Patriarchal Serbomans, 35 Greeks, 402 Vlachs, 12 Albanians and 444 Gypsies. In the city there were 2 lower secondary and 2 primary Bulgarian schools, one lower secondary and one primary Greek, Wallachian and Serbian schools.

The Annuario Pontificio identifies Veles instead with the Diocese of Bela, a suffragan of the Metropolitan Latin Archdiocese of Achrida (Ohrid) in Bulgaria, and lists it, as no longer a residential diocese, among the Latin titular bishoprics. It is probably in Bosnia and Hercegovina (modern Velika?).

Veles made international news in 2016 when it was revealed that a group of teenagers in the city were controlling over 100 websites producing fake news articles in support of U.S. presidential candidate Donald Trump, which were heavily publicized on the social media site Facebook. Although the websites were politically charged, the motive of these websites is thought to be to generate massive amounts of ad revenue, bringing into question problems with Facebook's newsfeed algorithm.

== Economy ==
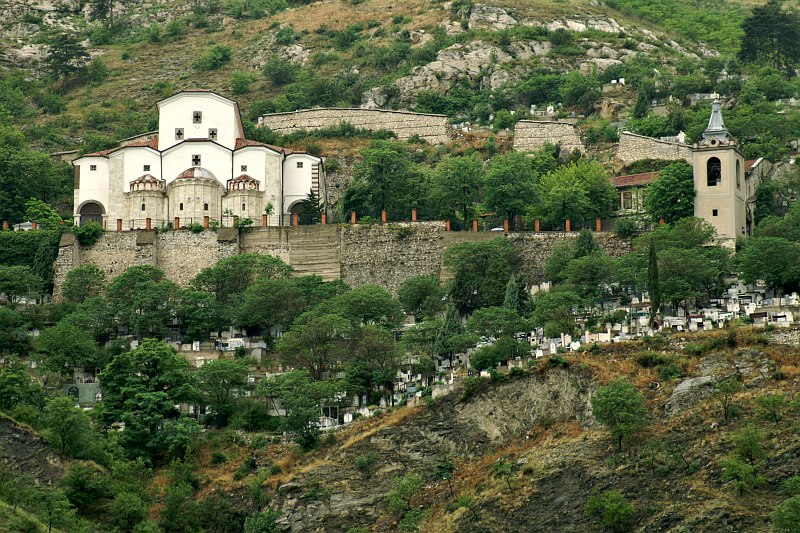
St. Pantelejmon Church in Veles

Throughout North Macedonia, Veles is known as an industrial center and recently, as a leader in the implementing of IT in the local administration in North Macedonia.

== Geography ==
Veles is a municipality of 55,000 residents. The geographic location of the city of Veles makes it suitable for hiking and camping, especially at the west side of the city. One such location is the tranquil village Bogomila. Nearby there is the man-made lake Mladost, which is known as the city's recreational centre.

== Climate ==
Climate data for Veles
Month	Jan	Feb	Mar	Apr	May	Jun	Jul	Aug	Sep	Oct	Nov	Dec	Year
Mean daily maximum °C (°F)	5 (41)	10 (50)	15 (59)	20 (68)	25 (77)	29 (84)	33 (91)	33 (91)	29 (84)	20 (68)	14 (57)	7 (45)	20 (68)
Mean daily minimum °C (°F)	−2 (28)	0 (32)	4 (39)	9 (48)	13 (55)	16 (61)	19 (66)	20 (68)	14 (57)	8 (46)	3 (37)	−1 (30)	9 (47)
Average precipitation mm (inches)	30 (1.2)	25 (1.0)	30 (1.2)	35 (1.4)	43 (1.7)	34 (1.3)	23 (0.9)	20 (0.8)	24 (0.9)	30 (1.2)	35 (1.4)	40 (1.6)	369 (14.6)
Average precipitation days	5	5	6	6	8	3	2	1	3	3	6	5	53
Average snowy days	3	0	0	0	0	0	0	0	0	0	0	1	4
Average relative humidity (%)	83	75	68	66	66	61	56	56	63	74	82	85	70
Mean monthly sunshine hours	100	190	250	290	300	315	330	310	280	220	160	120	2,865
Source: Climate-Data.org

== Media ==
Two TV stations operate in Veles - Channel 21 & Zdravkin - and many radio stations.

== Sports ==
Veles has many sports teams, the most popular of which are :

- FK Borec, football
- FK Gemidžii, football
- FK Prevalec, football
- RK Borec, handball
- BK Borec, wrestling
- KK Unibasket, basketball
- KK Borec, basketball

== International relations ==
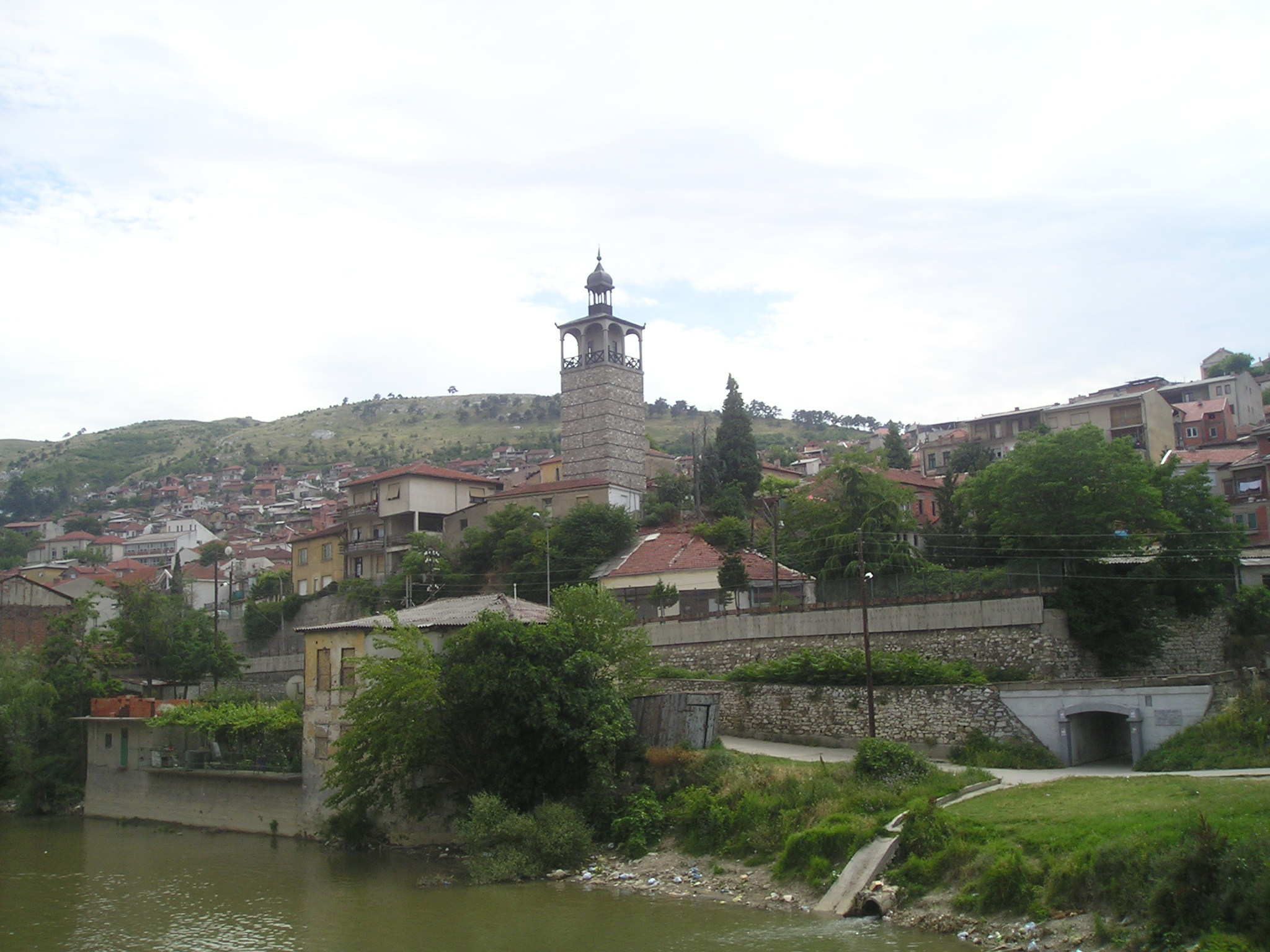
The clocktower in Veles

=== Twin towns – sister cities ===
Veles (city) is twinned with:

- Samobor (Croatia)
- Slobozia (Romania)
- Užice (Serbia)
- Sombor (Serbia)
- Niš (Serbia)
- Nowogard (Poland)
- Ráckeve (Hungary)

Other forms of partnership:

- Pula (Croatia) (Document of friendship and cultural cooperation in 2002)

== Notable locals ==
History, royalty and politics

- Metodi Aleksiev, revolutionary
- Jovan Babunski, Chetnik vojvoda
- Panko Brashnarov, revolutionary
- Ilija Dimovski, former member of the Assembly of North Macedonia
- Gheorghe Ghica, Prince of Moldavia
- Vasil Glavinov, revolutionary
- Igor Janusev, general secretary of VMRO-DPMNE, member of the Assembly of North Macedonia
- Alekso Martulkov, revolutionary
- Dimče Mirčev, WWII partisan
- Ivan Naumov, revolutionary
- Kole Nedelkovski, revolutionary
- Kazım Özalp, Turkish military officer
- Faik Pasha, general of the Ottoman Army
- Lazar Petrović, Serbian general and adjutant of King Aleksandar Obrenović
- Jordan Popjordanov, revolutionary
- Rizo Rizov, revolutionary
- Mile Pop Yordanov, revolutionary

Culture

- Leon Boga, writer, schoolteacher and archivist
- Yordan Hadzhikonstantinov-Dzhinot, teacher and publicist
- Kočo Racin, writer
- Svetozar Ristovski, film director
- Bobby Stojanov Varga, painter
- Rayko Zhinzifov, poet

Sports

- Ezgjan Alioski, footballer
- Panče Kumbev, footballer
- Safer Sali, Olympic wrestler

== Sources and external links ==
- Official website of Veles
