= Pythio =

Pythio/Pythion Πύθιο/Πύθιον
- Community
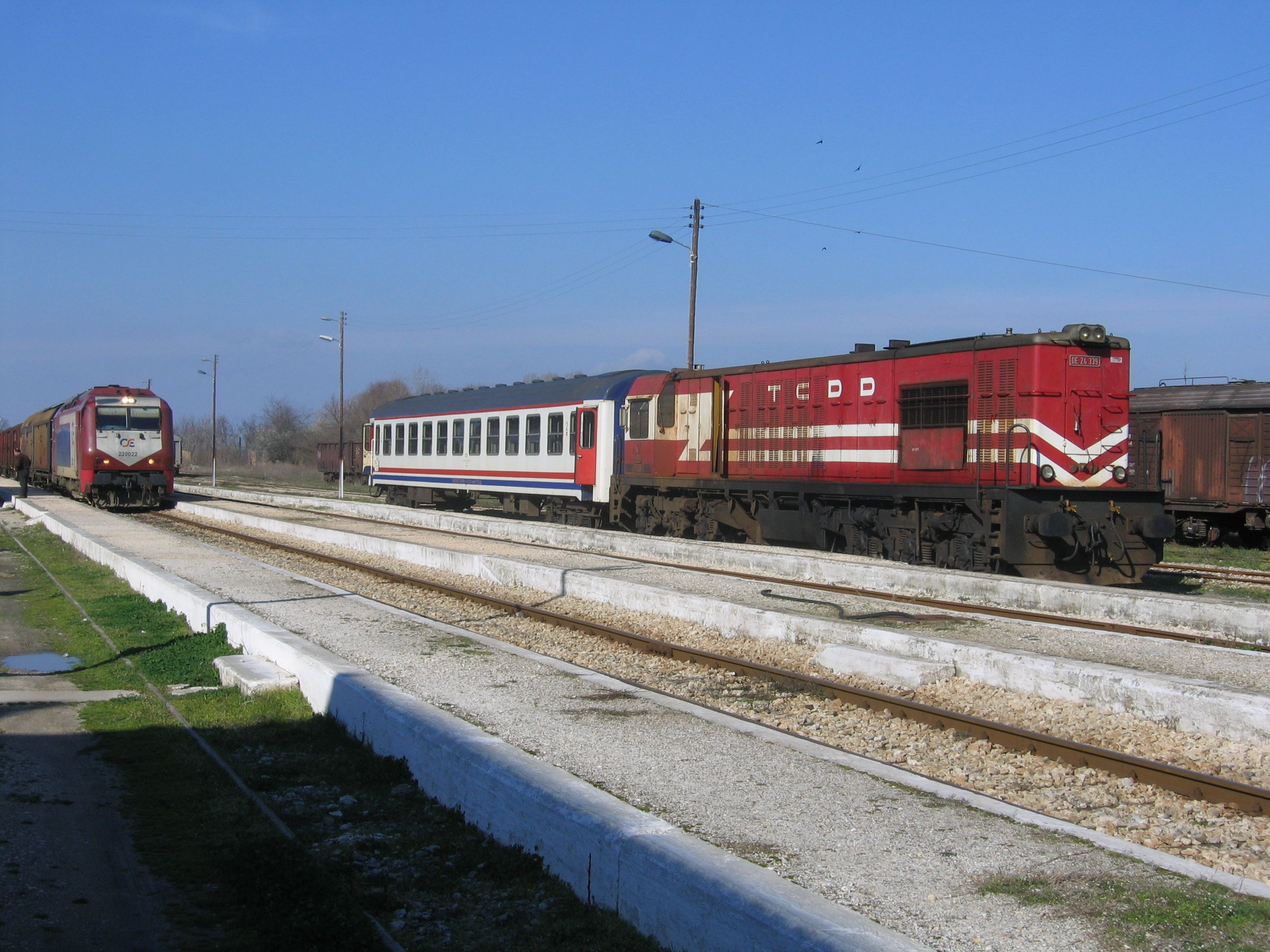
- Pythion railway station

- Location within Greece
- Coordinates: 41°22.85′N 26°36.64′E
- Country: Greece
- Administrative region: East Macedonia and Thrace
- Regional unit: Evros
- Municipality: Didymoteicho
- Municipal unit: Didymoteicho
- Lowest elevation: 55 m (180 ft)

Population (2021)
  - Community: 331
- Time zone: UTC+2 (EET)
  - Summer (DST): UTC+3 (EEST)
- Postal code: 683 00
- Area code: 25520

Pythio (Greek: Πύθιο, Turkish: Kuleliburgaz), also referred to as Pythion (Πύθιον), is a village and community in the eastern part of Didymoteicho municipality, Evros regional unit, Greece. It is 16 km east of the centre of Didymoteicho, on the right bank of the river Evros, where it forms the border with Turkey. There is no road border crossing near Pythio

The community of Pythio consists of the villages of Pythio, Rigio and Pythion railway station (Greek: Σταθμός Πυθίου, romanized: Stathmos Pythiou). The nearest villages are Petrades to the south and Asimenio to the northwest.

== Railway ==
Pythion railway station is a junction where the railway to Ormenio and Bulgaria branches off the main line from Thessaloniki to Istanbul through Alexandroupoli and Uzunköprü. The railway was built by the Chemins de fer Orientaux (CO), managed by Maurice de Hirsch, as part of the CO's contract to build a line from Istanbul to Vienna. The railway reached Pythio, known as Kuleliburgaz during Ottoman rule, in 1873, when the line from Istanbul to Edirne and Bulgaria was opened. A 112 km branch from Pythio to Alexandroupoli (then known as Dedeağaç) was opened in 1874.

When the railway was built it was all within the Ottoman Empire. During World War I the railway was an important link as the Ottoman Empire, Bulgaria and Austria-Hungary were all Central Allies. On 14 December 1916 Allied aeroplanes bombed the bridge over the river Evros near Pythio (Kuleliburgaz). Under the Treaty of Lausanne of 1923, a new border between Greece and Turkey was established at the Evros river, just east of Pythio, which had the result that the railway from Istanbul to Bulgaria entered Greece at Pythio, then re-entered Turkey at Edirne (Karaağaç railway station), re-entered Greece at Marasia, and finally entered Bulgaria between Ormenio and Svilengrad. This arrangement continued until 1971, when two new lines were opened. In Turkey the Edirne Cut-off was opened to allow trains from Istanbul to Bulgaria to run through Edirne entirely on Turkish territory, so that trains such as the Orient Express no longer had to stop at Pythio. In Greece a line was opened to allow trains from Pythio to Bulgaria to stay on Greek territory and avoid Edirne.

== Historical population ==
| Year | Village population | Community population |
|---|---|---|
| 1981 | 1,186 | - |
| 1991 | 734 | 951 |
| 2001 | 556 | 747 |
| 2011 | 429 | 541 |
| 2021 | 270 | 331 |

The town is populated by Arvanites.

== Sites of interest ==
- Castle of Pythion, built in the 14th century

== See also ==
- List of settlements in the Evros regional unit
- Alexandroupoli–Svilengrad railway
- Istanbul-Pythio railway
