= Petar Sokolov =

Bulgarian revolutionary (1870–1901)

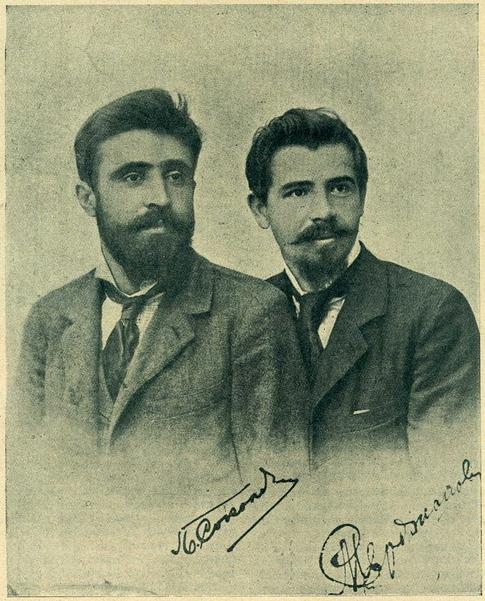
Petar Sokolov and Slavi Merdzhanov.

Petar Sokolov was a Bulgarian revolutionary, anarchist, and member of the Internal Macedonian-Adrianople Revolutionary Organization.

== Biography ==
Petar Sokolov was born in 1870 in Kyustendil, then in the Ottoman Empire. He graduated from the secondary school in Kyustendil and then moved to Sofia. Since he had the talent of an artist, he moves among artists and associates with famous artists. After all, Sokolov decided to join the Macedonian-Adrianopolitan revolutionary movement. From June to October 1899 Sokolov took part in a cheta, led by Gotse Delchev. The Cheta managed to kidnap a rich Greek and later released him for a ransom.

In 1899, together with Slavi Merdjanov, Pavel Shatev and Petar Mandjukov, they dug a tunnel under the central office of the Ottoman Bank in Istanbul, where they planned to set a dynamite. The Chairman of the Supreme Macedonian-Adrianople Committee, Boris Sarafov, provided the money for that operation. In September 1900, the tunnel was almost completed, but due to difficulties with the supply of dynamite, the plan was temporarily abandoned. Soon, however, an Armenian revolutionary was trying to supply to the Bulgarians in the Ottoman capital explosives, but the Turkish authorities managed to arrest him. The investigation led them to the four revolutionaries who are arrested. Still, the Ottoman authorities fail to locate the tunnels and ultimately released the detainees. Merdjanov and Sokolov were deported to Bulgaria.

Merdzjanov and Sokolov went to Sofia and began to think up new ideas, one of which was to hold up the Orient Express on Turkish territory near Adrianople, and to gain possession of the mail in order to finance future actions. In pursuit of this plan, they went to the Adrianople area in July 1901, with a cheta consisting of ten men, equipped with the help of Pavel Genadiev, the Supreme Macedonian Committee's representative in Plovdiv. The cheta managed to place a large quantity of dynamite on the railway line, but something went wrong, and the train passed undamaged. After this failure, they kidnapped the son of a rich Turkish landowner, but they were soon discovered and surrounded by Turkish forces. In a battle near the village of Matochina, most of the terrorists were killed or seriously wounded. Sokolov was among the dead, and Merdzjanov was captured alive, together with a Bulgarian and two Armenians. The captives were taken to Adrianople, where, in November 1901, all four were publicly hanged.
