= Pokrovnik, Bulgaria =

Pokrovnik Покровник
- Village
- Location within Bulgaria
- Coordinates: 41°59′N 23°3′E
- Country: Bulgaria
- Province: Blagoevgrad Province
- Municipality: Blagoevgrad

Government
  - Mayor: Nedko Angelov (VMRO-BND)

Area
  - Total: 18.609 km^{2} (7.185 sq mi)
- Elevation: 338 m (1,109 ft)

Population (15 December 2010)
  - Total: 881
- GRAO
- Time zone: UTC+2 (EET)
  - Summer (DST): UTC+3 (EEST)
- Postal Code: 2708
- Area code: 073

Pokrovnik is a village in Blagoevgrad Municipality, in Blagoevgrad Province, Bulgaria. It is situated very close to Blagoevgrad on the right bank of Struma river.
