= Yordan Popyordanov =

Bulgarian revolutionary

Yordan "Orce" Popyordanov (Bulgarian: Йордан (Орце) Пoпйopдaнoв; Macedonian: Јордан (Орце) Поп Јорданов; 1881 – April 17, 1903) was a Bulgarian revolutionary and anarchist in Ottoman Macedonia.

== Biography ==
After graduating from the Bulgarian Men's High School of Thessaloniki he joined the "Gemidzhii Circle", which in the spring of 1903 launched a campaign of Thessaloniki bombings of 1903 to draw world attention to the conditions in Macedonia under Ottoman rule. One of the buildings chosen was the French Ottoman Bank, which Orce was assigned to bomb through the underground passageway dug out weeks before by the Gemidzhii. Prior to the attacks, he visited Geneva to consult with Macedonian Supreme Committee leader Boris Sarafov about the attacks. He then received 10,000 Swiss francs from him. Popyordanov died in the explosion on April 17. On the eve of the attacks in Thessaloniki, Popyordanov insured his life for BGN 100,000. Orce's goal was that after his death the amount will be paid and deposited in the Supreme Macedonian Committee treasury.

== See also ==
- Anarchism in Bulgaria
