= Flags of Internal Macedonian-Adrianople Revolutionary Organization =

The flags of Internal Macedonian-Adrianople Revolutionary Organization were sewn in the period of existence of the IMARO between 1893 - 1915. Some of them are preserved until today, others are lost or destroyed.

== Flags of Saloniki revolutionary district ==
=== Enidzhe Vardar flag ===
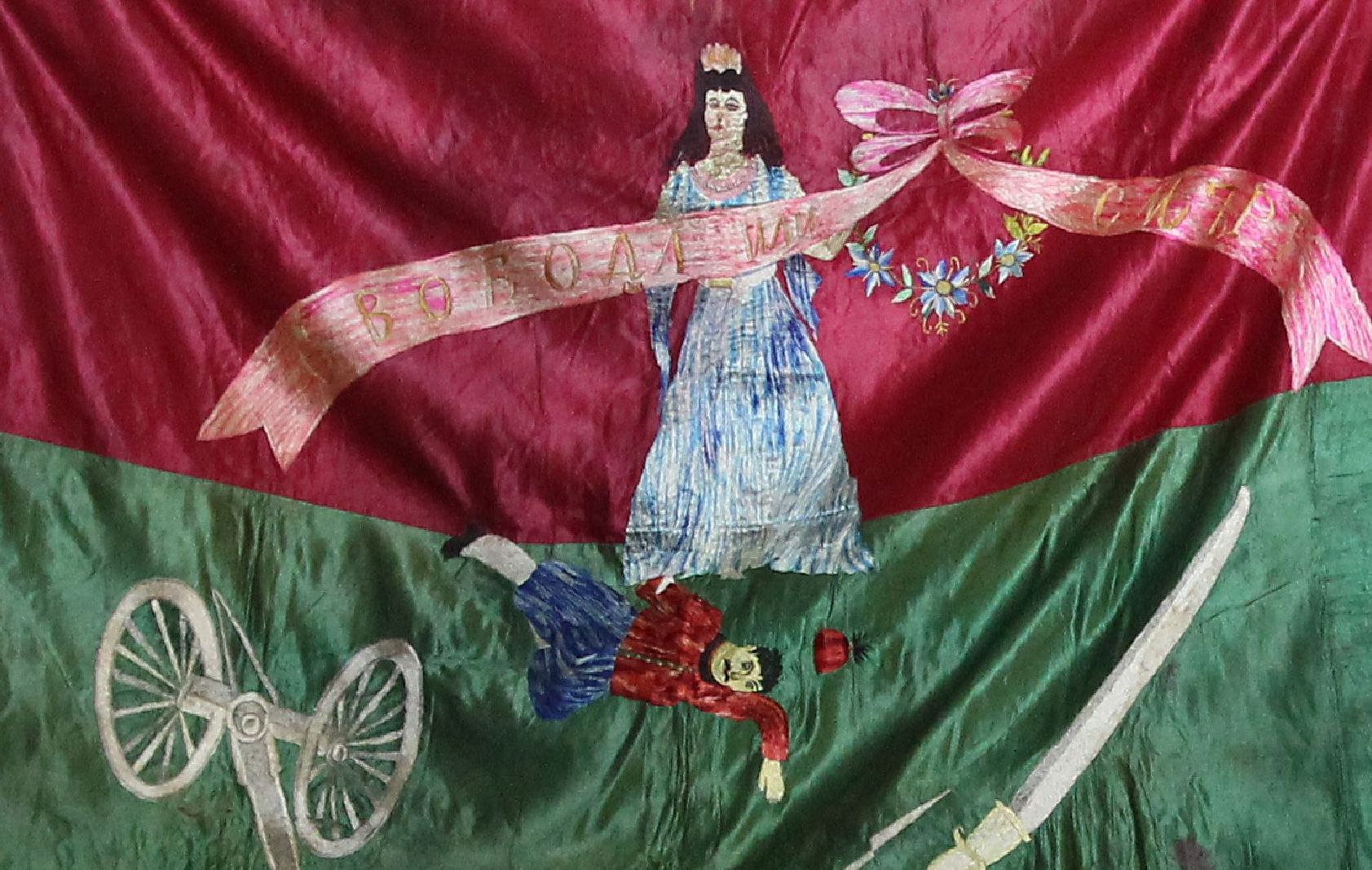
Flag of Enidzhe Vardar cheta

The flag was sewn by the teacher Maria Kapitancheva in the winter of 1903 on the instructions of Apostol Petkov. It represents a stitched red and green cloth with a girl standing before a slain Turkish soldier, with the inscription "Liberty or Death" above her. On the reverse side, the motto "Dare, people, God is with us" is written on an Orthodox cross. After the Ilinden Uprising, the flag was saved by Father Dimitar Jutev. The descendant of Bulgarians from Aegean Macedonia, Anka Nikolova Hikimova - Kolakova, submitted it in 2014 to National Military Museum Sofia.

=== Kukush flag ===
The flag was sewn by Anna Maleshevska with the help of Raina Izmirlieva according to a project by Mitso Izmirliev. The flag was double-layered - red and green. It is embroidered with a girl holding a flag that reads "Liberty or Death" and below it the motto "Down with the tyrant". The flag was captured by the Turkish army and taken to Thessaloniki.

=== Tikvesh flag ===
The flag was made in March 1903 in the house of Jovanche Mihailovski by Evgenia Mihailovska, Tima Mincheva, Lefterka Grozdanova and Ana Ivanova under the direction of Pane Ivanov. The flag is made of red fabric with the inscriptions "Tikvesh revolutionary region" and "Freedom or death", and below them a girl with a waved Bulgarian flag stepping on a killed Turkish soldier. The sewn flag was handed over to Voivode Petar Ilkov and was used in the Ilinden Uprising. It was used again in the Tikvesh Uprising when it was captured by Serbian troops. It was kept in the Belgrade Museum, but during the bombing of Belgrade in 1941 it burned down.

== Flags of Bitola revolutionary region ==
=== Main flag of Bitola region ===
It was sewn by the teachers Fotinka Petrova, Vasilka Stefanova-Pophristova, Aneta Spirova Olcheva, Aspasia Dimova Yakimova, Vasilka Poppetrova-Naranzhova, Vasilka Lazeva Lazheva, Paraskeva Aceva and others, according to a project by the students from Bitola High School Dragan Zografov and Arseni Yovkov. The inscriptions "Freedom or Death" and "Second Mac. Adr. Rev. Reg.: Bitola, Prilep, Lerin, Kostura, Krushovo, Kichevo, Debar, Demir-Hisar" are embroidered on it. On the reverse, on a red background, is written "Dare, people. God is with us", as well as a Christian cross. After the uprising, the flag was brought to Bulgaria, and in 1907 Boris Sarafov was buried with it.

=== Bitola Demirhisar flag ===
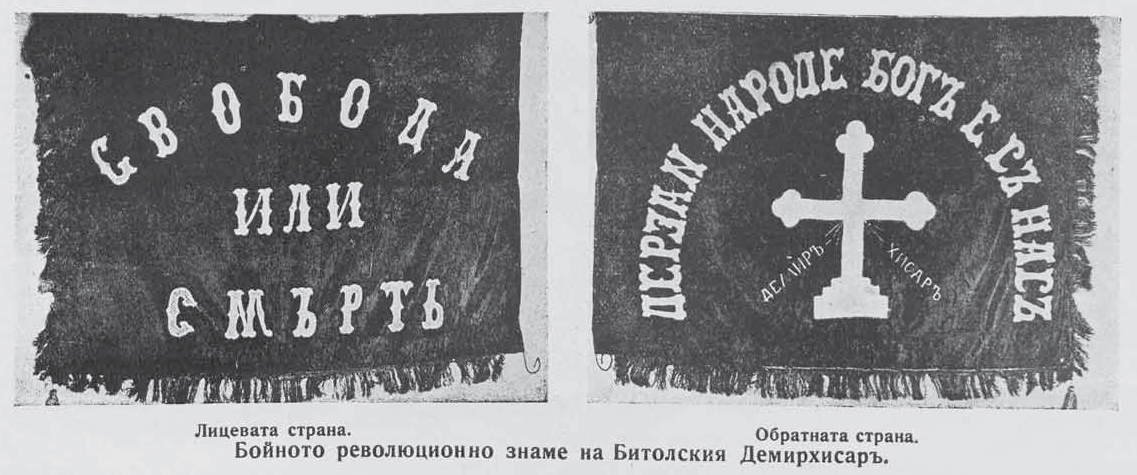
Flag of Bitola Demirhisar district

The motto "Freedom or death" is written on the front side, and on the reverse side of the flag is written in a semicircle "Dare people, God is with us", and in it an Orthodox cross with the inscription "Demir Hisar".

=== Krushevo flag ===
Flag of third regiment of Pitu Guli's cheta

The flag of the 3rd detachment of Pitu Guli is made of red silk cloth trimmed with yellow tinsel. The motto "Freedom or Death - Banner of the Krushevo cheta" is embroidered in a circle, and in it shaking hands as a symbol of unity and a lit torch above them. It was handed over to standard-bearer Georgi Ginov. The flag is believed to be kept in the Istanbul History Museum.

=== Lerin flag ===
The banner of the Lerin troops belonged to the cheta of Dzole Gergev. The inscriptions "IMAROorganization" and "Lerinska Okoliya" are depicted, all in capital letters. The flag is known from photographs taken during the Young Turk Revolution. The flag is not saved.

=== Ohrid flag ===
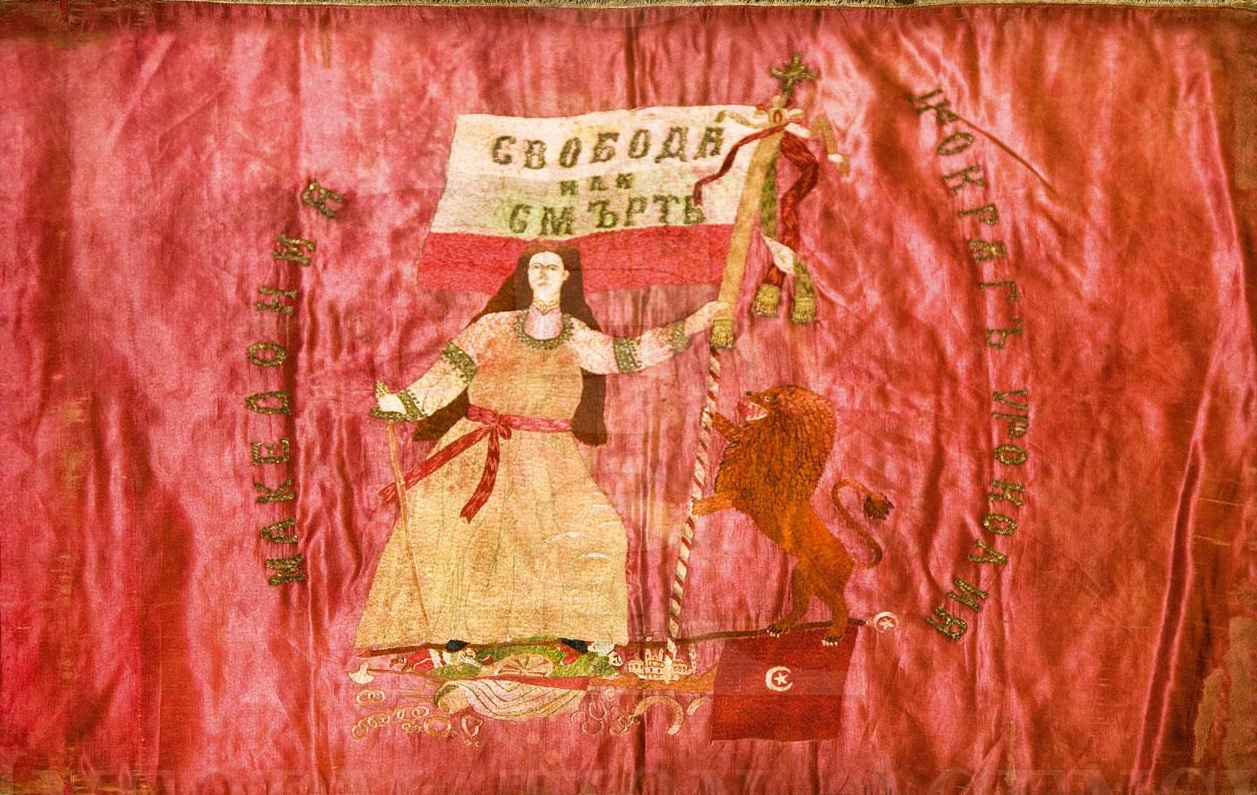
Ohrid cheta flag

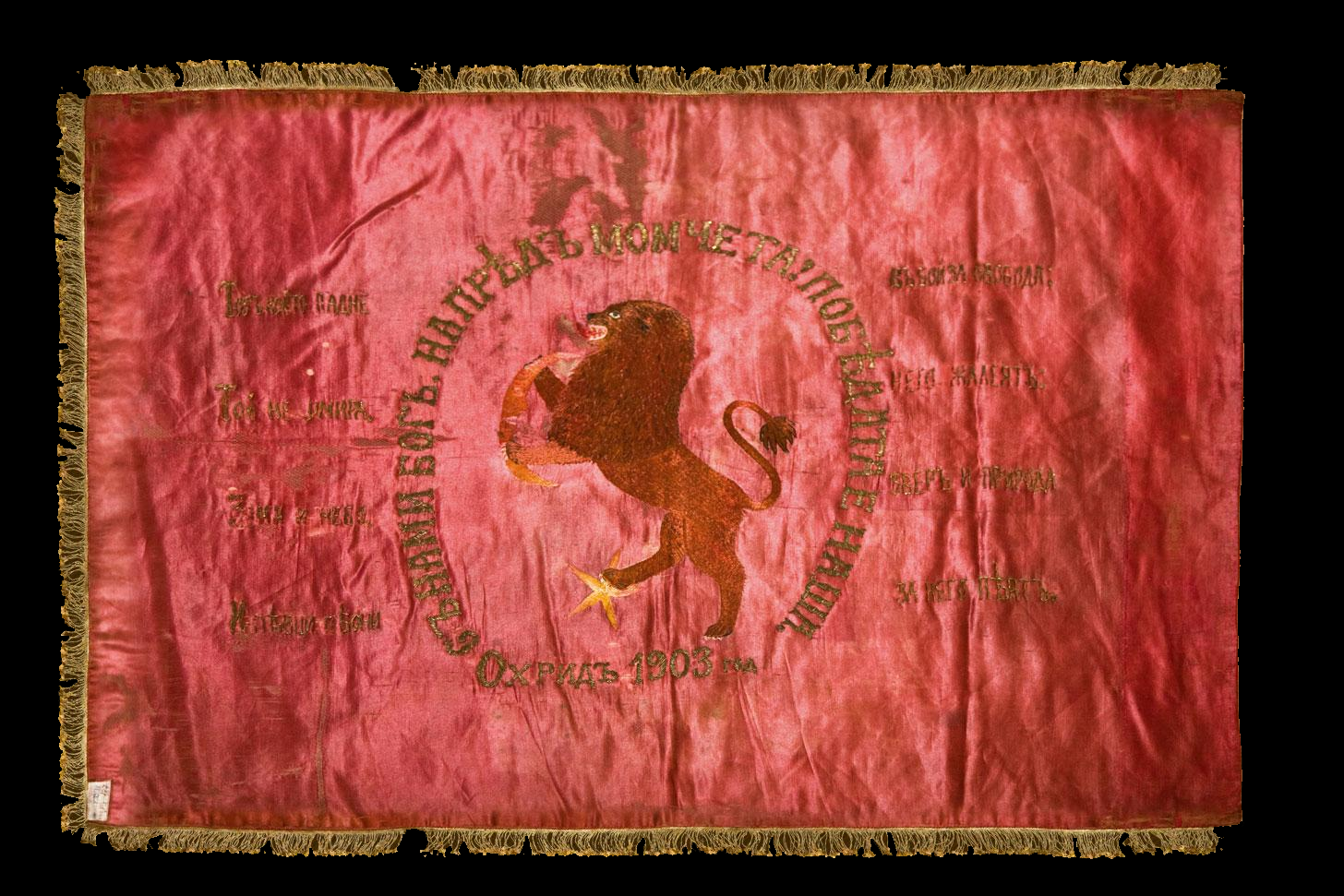
Ohrid cheta flag (back)

It was embroidered by Ohrid teachers Vasilka Razmova, Konstantina Boyadzhieva, Slavka Chakarova, Poliksena Mosinova. It is made of red silk fabric. It represents a girl with a Bulgarian tricolor in her hand and in it the inscription "Freedom or Death" and an upright lion stepping on a Turkish flag. It is stored in the National military museum in Sofia.

=== Rantsi flag ===
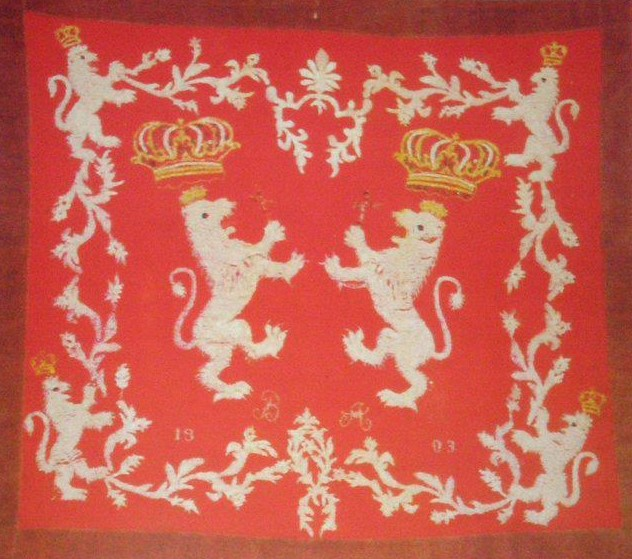
Rantsi flag during Ilinden-Preobrazhenie uprising.

The flag from the Ilinden Uprising of the village of Ranci, brought to Lesok by Angel Boyarovski and handed over to the Museum of Macedonia in Skopje. It is made of red cotton fabric, embroidered on one side with white and yellow threads and measuring 71 x 65 cm. In the center are two white lions erect and crowned, surrounded by a floral border of white, and below them are the letters "B" and "A" and the year 1903. In the four corners are four smaller lions, and on all sides the flag is draped from another red ribbon measuring 5 cm. According to some researchers, it is a wedding flag, not a revolutionary flag.

=== Struga flag ===
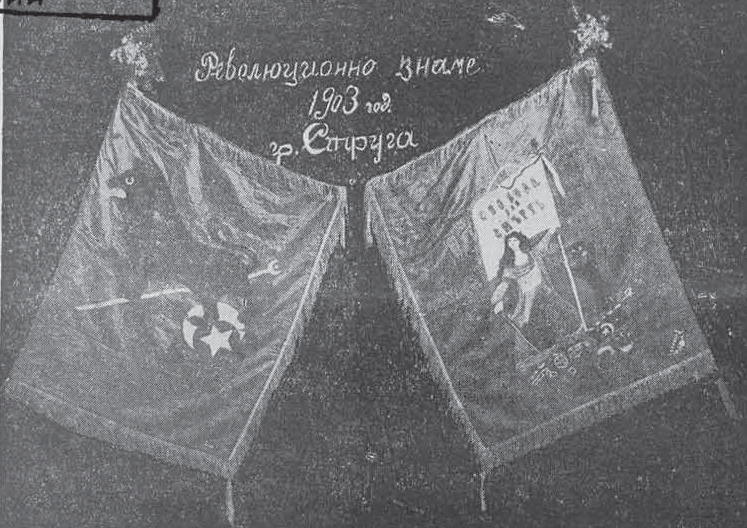
Flag of Struga cheta

The flag of the Struzhka Cheta was made by Vasila Matova, Slavka, Anastasia and Militsa Chakarovi and Tsareva and Konstantina Derebanovi, Kostadina Galabova, Katerina Nesterova, Kostadinka Vangelova and Anastasia Milusheva. It is made of red silk fabric. On the face, a woman with a Bulgarian tricolor and the inscription "Freedom or Death" is embroidered on it, and on the back - a lion trampling Turkish flags. Submitted to National military museum in Sofia in 1982 by Yordanka Miladinova-Chernova and her son, engineer Kliment Chernov.

=== Flags of Kastoria revolutionary district ===
The Kostur revolutionary district was established in 1898. During the preparation of the Ilinden-Preobrazhenie uprising, eight central detachments were organized with their own banners.

==== Balgarska Blatsa flag ====
The flag of the center detachment of the Bulgarian Blatsa is made of a bright red background of two cloths, and in the corners it is decorated with tinsel. It is approximately 1.1 x 1.5 m in size. On one side, a fallen insurgent is embroidered, on whom a young girl places a wreath, and on the other side, with silk thread, the verse of "Hadji Dimitar" by Hristo Botev is embroidered: "He who falls in the fight for freedom, he does not die, he is pitied heaven and earth, beast and nature, and singers sing songs about him." His standard-bearer was Hristo Leksov from Kondorobi, and Andrei Sidov and Atanas Orlov died defending him. In the fighting, the flag suffered damage and was pierced by seven bullets and spattered with blood.

==== Dobrolishta flag ====
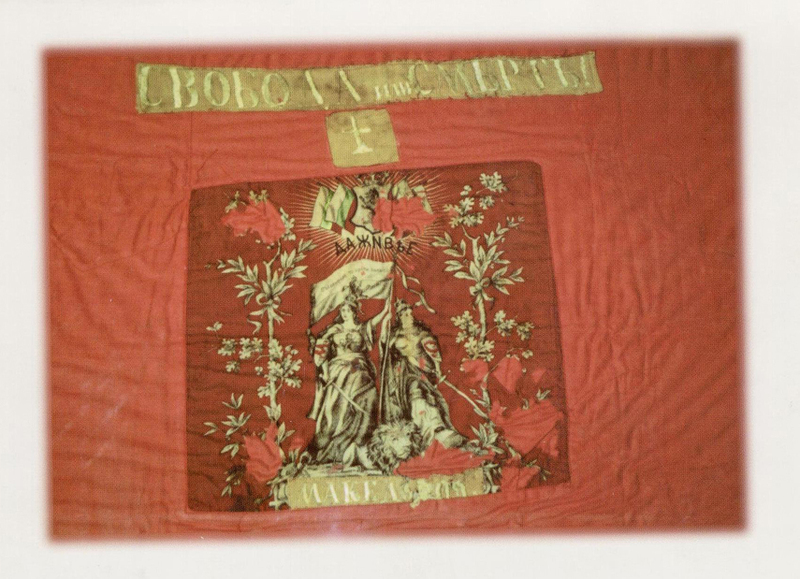
Dobrolishta flag

During the Ilinden Uprising, it was waved by the squad of Nikola Dobrolitski. The flag of the detachment from the Kostur village of Dobrolishte was preserved towards the middle of the Second World War, when Pascal Kalimanov showed it to Prime Minister Bogdan Filov in Sofia in 1943. The Dobrolish flag is a red cloth with a darker red cloth sewn onto it. The inscriptions "Freedom or death", a cross, "To live", "Macedonia" are depicted, as well as two young women symbolizing Macedonia and Adrianople Thrace. It is housed in the MPO Archives in Fort Wayne.

==== Dambeni flag ====
The flag of the Dumbeni center group was exported by the teachers Maslina Grancharova and Elena (Yanakieva) Minasova, but at the beginning of the uprising it was handed over to the Vishen center.

==== Zagorichani flag ====
The flag of the detachment from Zagorichani, Kostursko, was sewn by Maslina Grancharova. It was used by the village band during the Ilinden-Preobrazhensky Uprising, and its standard-bearer was first Georgi Pophristov from Kumanichevo, and after his death by Iv. Kalgatronov. Andon Shalev emigrated to Sofia and saved the flag. For many years it was placed over the mortal remains of Gotse Delchev in the Macedonian Cultural House, but it is now lost.

The flag depicts an upright crowned lion holding a scythe and a rifle in its paws. Above it is embroidered the inscription "Liberty or Death", at the bottom of the flag "July 20, 1903 Zagorichani", and in the four corners crescent moons.

Its size is less than 1 x 1 m and it is made of dark red cloth.

==== Konomladi flag ====
The Konomladi center flag is made of a bright red background of two sails, and in the corners it is decorated with tinsel. It is approximately 1.1 x 1.5 m in size. On one side is a young woman with a sword in her hand and a crescent moon under her feet. On the other side, the verse from Hristo Botev's "Prayer" is embroidered with silk thread: "Inspire everyone, oh God, with holy love for freedom, so that when the slave rises, in the ranks of the struggle, I too will seek the grave." In the battles, the flag was damaged and it was pierced by eighteen bullets, and a grenade tore through its middle. The standard-bearer is Novachko Kotev from Konomladi.

It was handed over to Vasil Kotev's squad and upon the death of the voivode in Lagen, it was buried near him.

==== Kosinets flag ====
The flag, sewn by the teacher Viktoria Mihailova for the central detachment from Kosinets, was handed over to the Dumbeni central detachment with flag bearer Lazar Palchev and deputy flag bearer Ivan Preshlenkov from Dumbeni.

==== Mokreni flag ====
The flag of the central detachment in Mokreni, embroidered by the teacher Maria Vangelova, is red with a golden lion embroidered on one side and the inscription "Freedom or Death" on the other. The flag bearer is Kartela Tegov Pachin.

==== Smardesh flag ====
There is no preserved information about the center flag of the Smardesh Squad, except that it was sewn by Zoya Chekalarova - Markovska. It is most likely a red square cloth with the inscription "Liberty or Death", and below it a young woman armed with a sword in her hand, standing above a crescent moon.

== Flags of Serres revolutionary region ==
=== Bansko flag ===
It was sewn by Elisaveta Usheva and Spaska Georgieva according to the project of the teacher Vasil Teofilov from Belitsa. The flag depicted a girl stepping on a broken chain. In her hands is a spear with a banner and the inscription "Liberty or Death". It was preserved after the suppression of the uprising and used again during the Balkan War by the detachment of Hristo Chernopeev, Peyo Yavorov, Lazar Kolchagov and Yonko Vaptsarov. Flag bearer is Mile Kolchagov.

=== Mehomiya (Razlog) flag ===
The flag was sewn by Raina Kanazireva and Elena Kalaidzhieva. On a cherry-red silk cloth with white threads, the motto "Liberty or Death" is embroidered in a semicircle, and in the middle a maiden with broken chains.

== Flags of Skopje revolutionary region ==
=== Kratovo flag ===
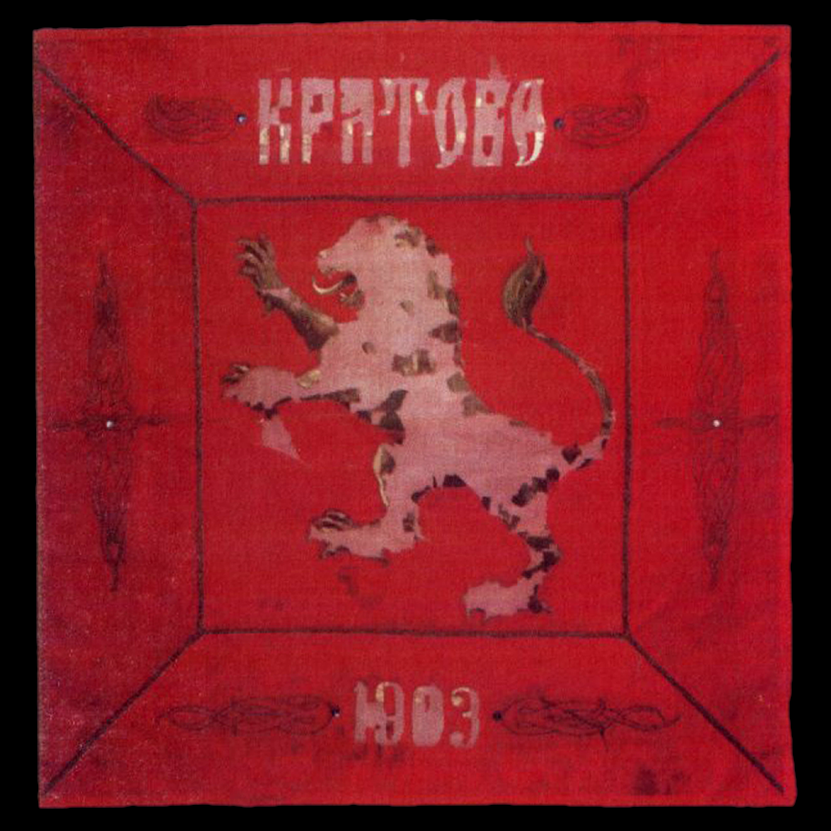
Kratovo insurgents flag

The flag is made of red fabric and has a standing lion on it with the inscriptions "Kratovo" and "1903". A skull and crossbones is painted on the back. The flag was handed over to Yordan Spasov's squad. Between 1950 and 1980, the flag was in the History Museum of Sofia, after which it was handed over to the National Museum of Sofia, where it is kept until today.

=== Kumanovo flag ===
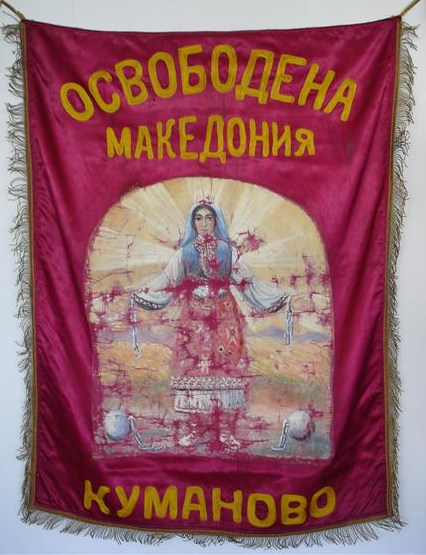
Kumanovo insurgents flag

The flag is made of red cloth with a girl in folk costume in the middle. The inscription "Liberated Macedonia" is written above it, and "Kumanovo" below it. On the obverse is the inscription "Ilinden" and "1903", and in the middle there is an armed chetnik. Until 1965, it was kept in the Kumanovo Municipality, after which it was exhibited in the Historical Museum - Kumanovo.

=== Radovish flag ===
The flag was made by Zoitsa Kokotanova from Radovish and Efrosina Popivanova from Pehchevo, teachers in Dedino and Voislavtsi, respectively. It was developed by the squad of voivoda Nikola Zhekov.

== Flags of Adrianople revolutionary region ==
=== Ahachelebiisko (Smolyan) flag ===
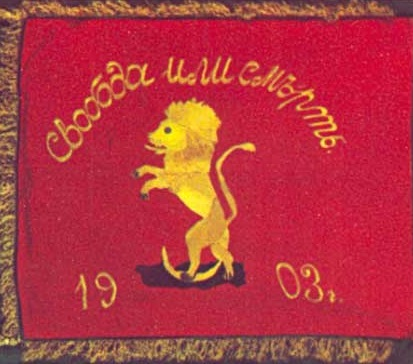
Ahachelebi (Smolyan) flag

The flag was sewn on red cloth in 1898 by the teachers Tota Doncheva, Stana Veleva and Zheka Kefilska, in 1903 Dora Todorova Shishmanova and Maria Stoilova Shishkova completed the inscription with "1903". Besides him, a standing lion and the inscription "Freedom or Death" are written on the obverse, and on the reverse - the abbreviation "M.K.R.A" (probably the Local Committee of the Rhodopes Ahachelebiiski) and "Central Rhodopes". The flag bearer was Nikola Shishmanov. The flag was kept and used by the Rhodope Partisan Detachment, after which it was handed over to the National Military Museum in Sofia.

=== Zabernovo flag ===
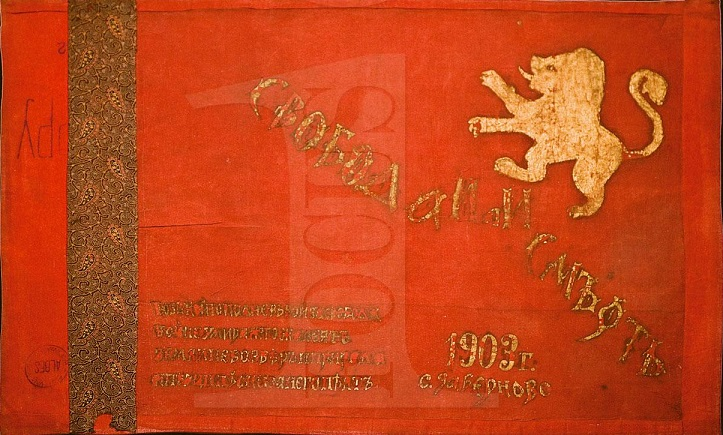
Zabernovo flag

The flag was made by Diko Djelebov from red fabric and painted by Yordan Meshkov. A standing armed lion is painted on it in gold paint with the inscriptions "Freedom or Death", "He who falls fighting for freedom, he does not die. Earth and sky, beast and nature pity him and singers sing about him" and "1903 Zabernovo village". After the uprising, the flag was kept by Petar Gorov, who handed it over to National Military Museum in Sofia in 1938.

=== Lozengrad flag ===
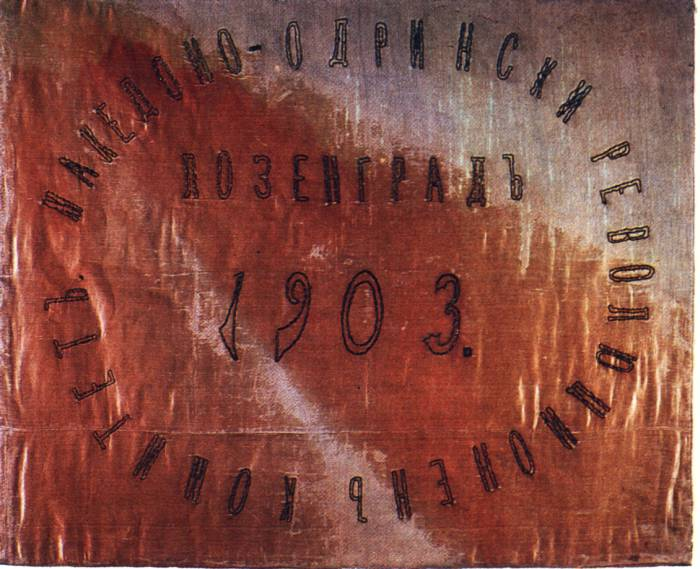
Lozengrad flag

The flag was painted by Georgi Popkirov for the band of Lazar Madzharov. It was sewn by the teachers Rada Boyadzhieva, Nevyana Argirova, Milka Nikolova, Rusia Naydenova and Maria Popstoyanova on the initiative of the head teacher Todor Petkov. On the front is a woman dressed in a pink dress and draped with a gray cloak. In his hand he holds a flag with the motto "Freedom or Death", and next to it is written the verse "He who falls fighting for freedom, he does not die". On the reverse is painted the inscription "Macedonian Revolutionary Organization" and a skull with bones. The flag was burned before the uprising to avoid capture. After the beginning of the uprising, Lazar Madzharov used another flag made of orange silk fabric. The text "Lozengrad 1903" is embroidered on its front, and "Macedonian-Adrianople Revolutionary Committee" in the semicircle. On the reverse is the motto "Freedom or death" and "Dare, people, God is with you!". The flag was preserved and handed over to the Plovdiv Historical Museum, and in 1943 to the National Military museum in Sofia.

=== Malko Tarnovo flag ===
The flag was sewn by teachers Milka Atanasova Zagorcheva from Malko Tarnovo and Milka Ivanova from Lozengrad. "Internal Macedonian-Odrina Revolutionary Organization "Strandja"" is written on its front side. On the reverse side, the motto "Freedom and Human Rights" is embroidered. It was waved by the squad of Georgi Kondolov. After the suppression of the uprising, the flag was handed over to the chairman of the Macedonian-Odrina Society in Alan Kairjak, Stamo Grudov. The flag is then lost.

== Gallery ==
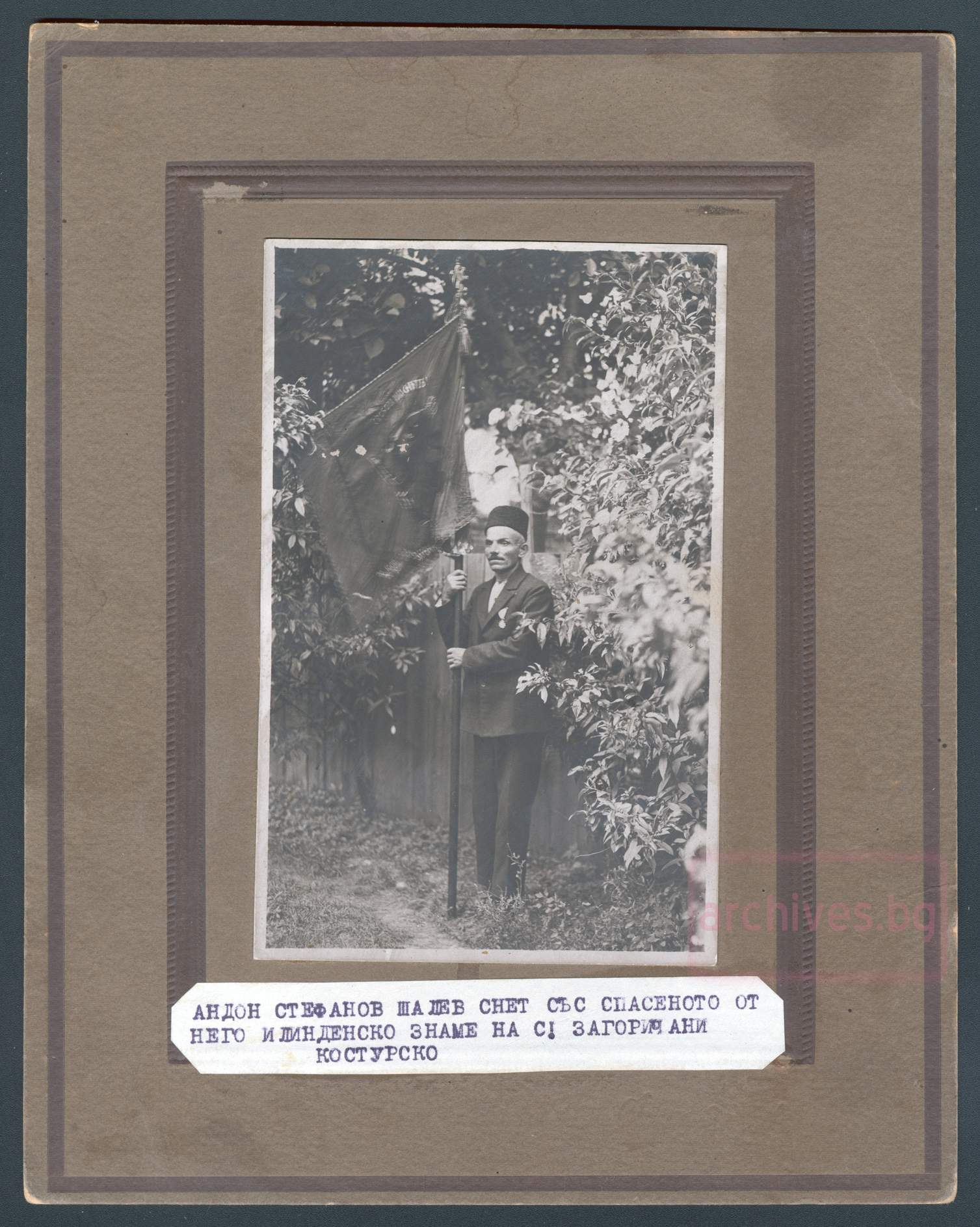
Andon Shalev with Zagorichani flag, 1943

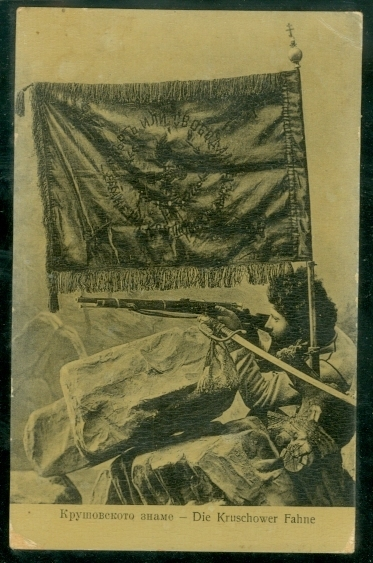
Insurgent with Krushevo republic flag

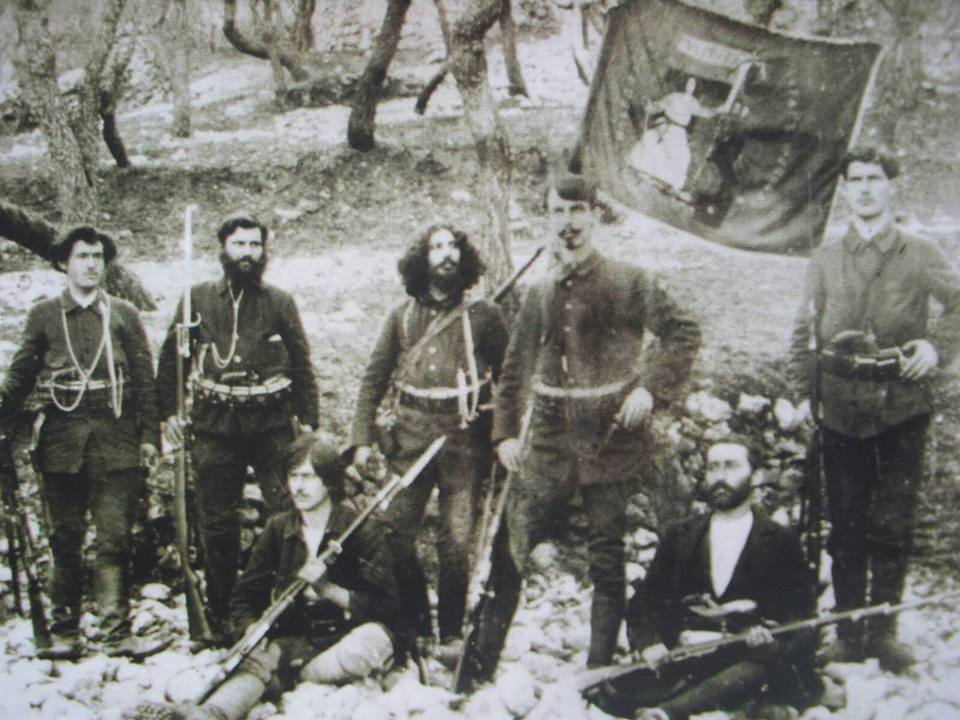
Cheta of Petar Chaulev with the Ohrid insurgents flag

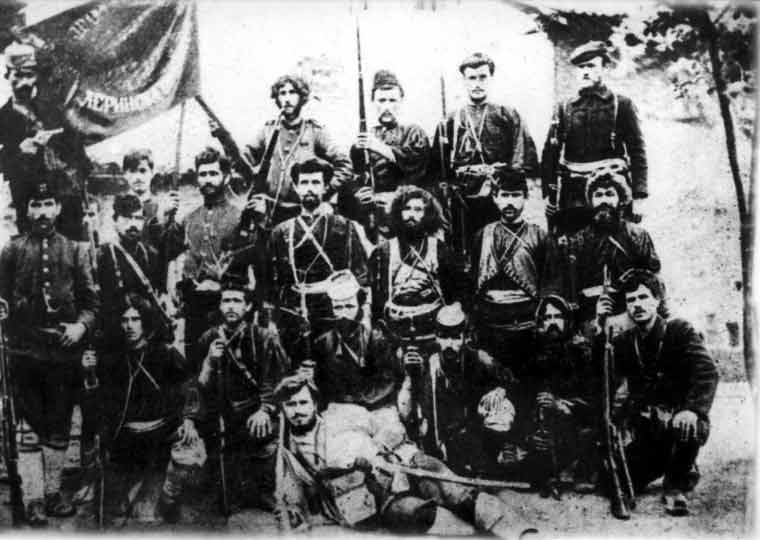
United cheta of Dzole Stoychev and Stoycho Ivanov with the Lerin flag, 1908

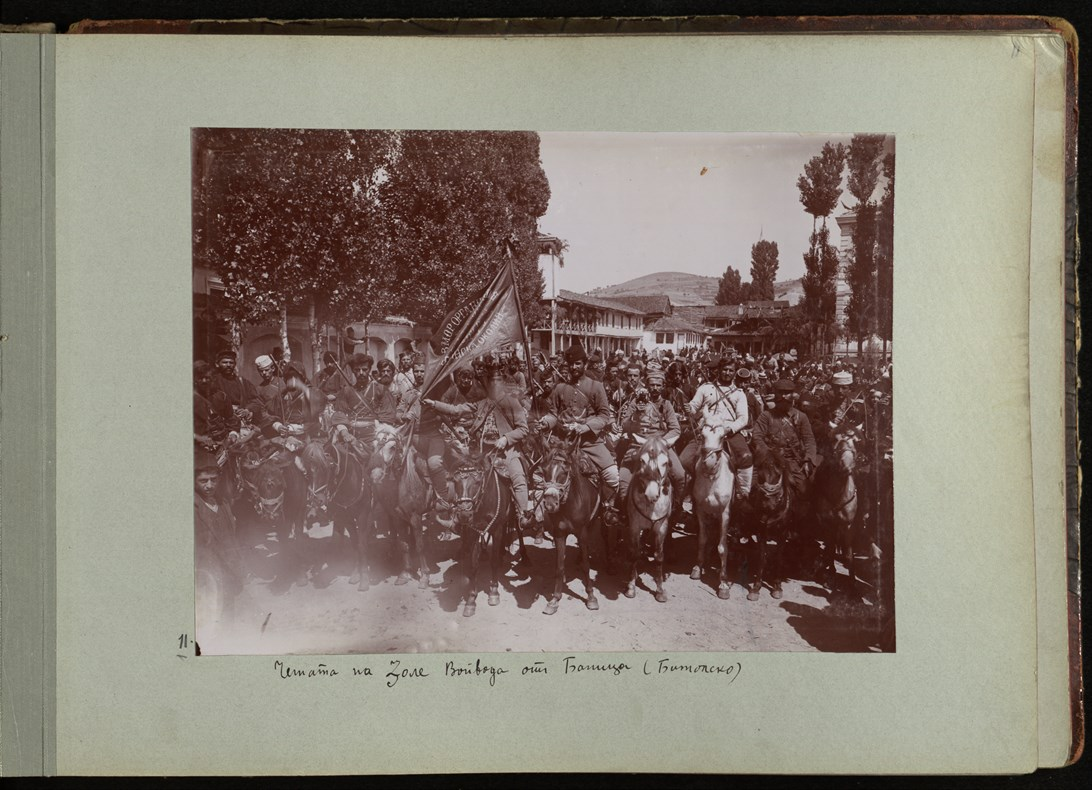
Kraste Lyondev, Dzole Gergev, Kraste Malikov and others with the Lerin flag, 1908

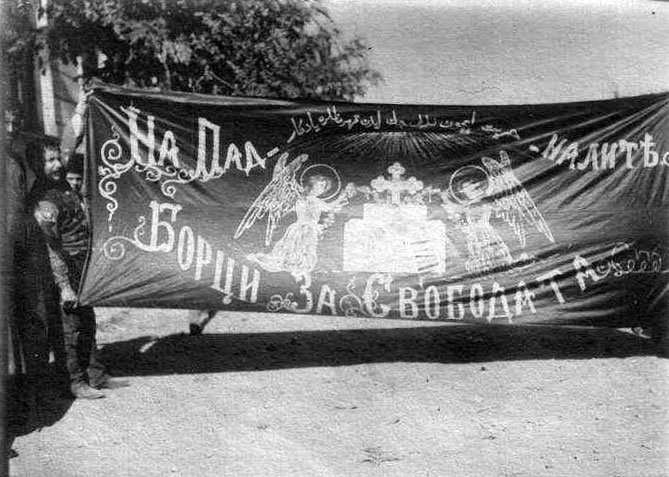
Remembrance flag of the united cheti of Bitola revolutionary region during Young Turks revolution, 1908

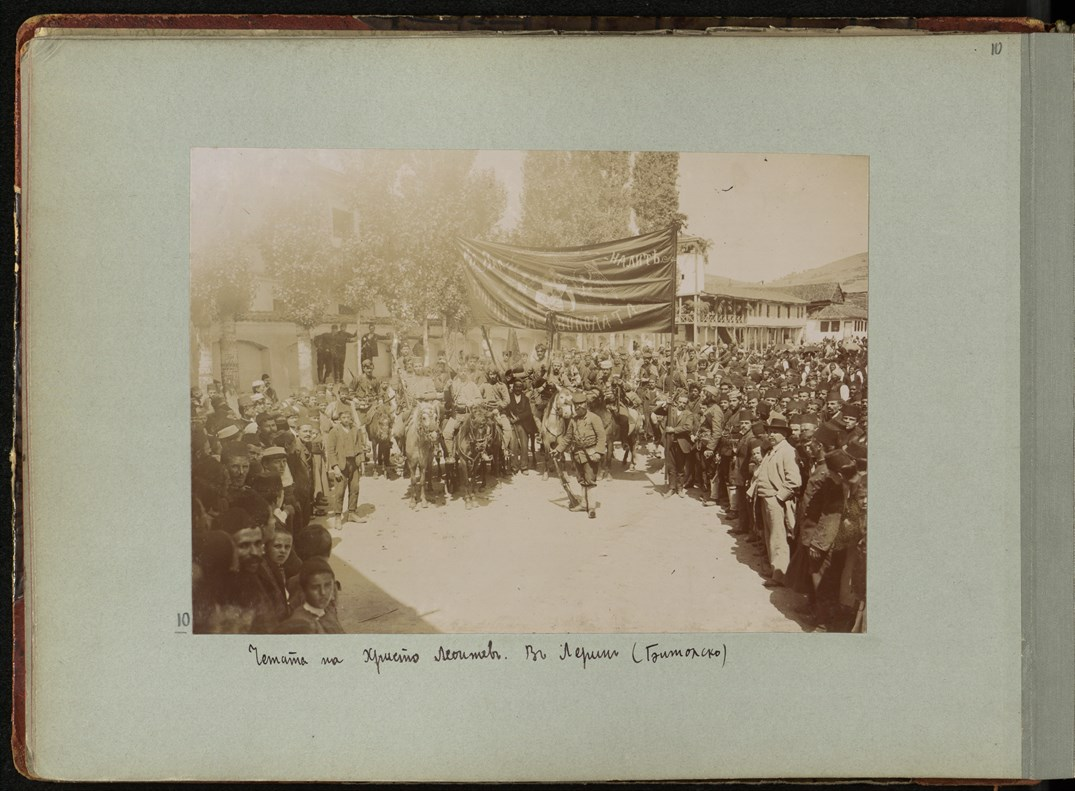
Kraste Lyondev and his cheta with the remembrance flag in Bitola revolutionary region, 1908

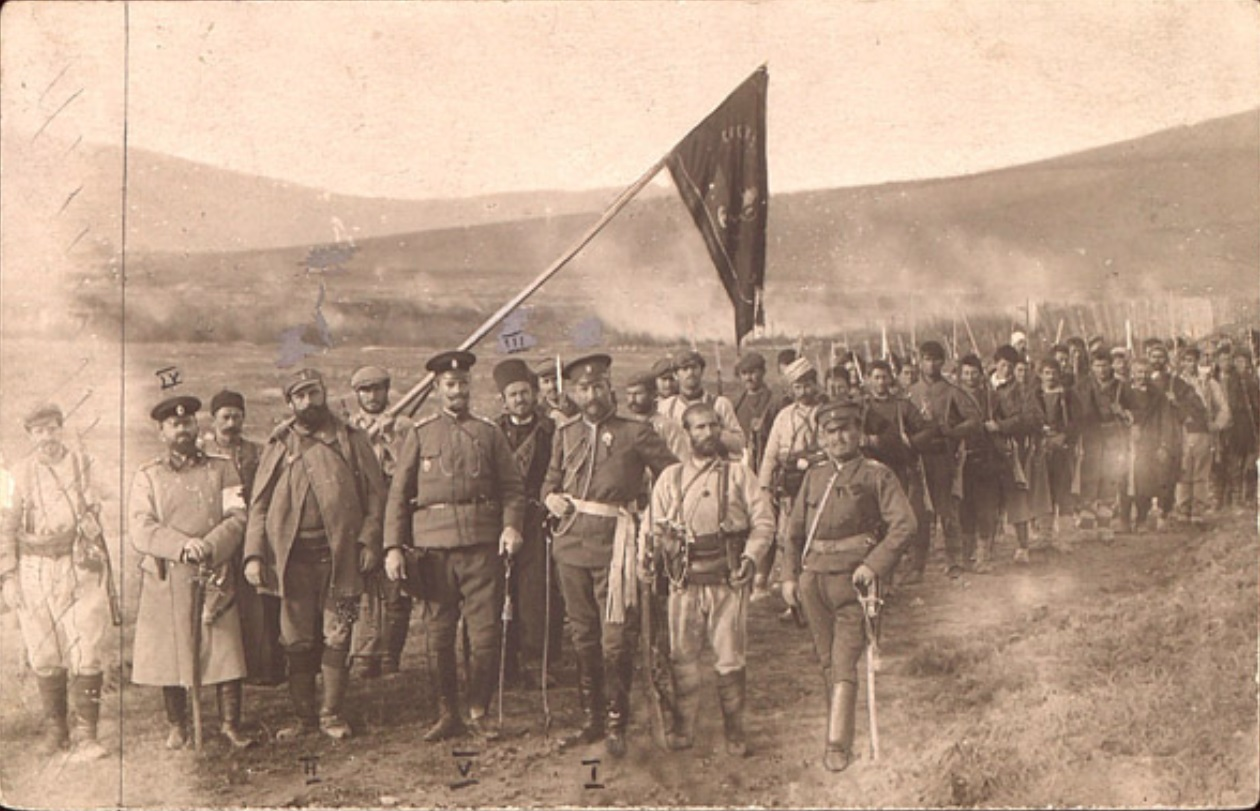
Cheta of Yane Sandanski with his flag and Bulgarian officers during Balkan wars, 1912-1913

== See also ==
- Svoboda ili smart
