= Culture of North Macedonia =

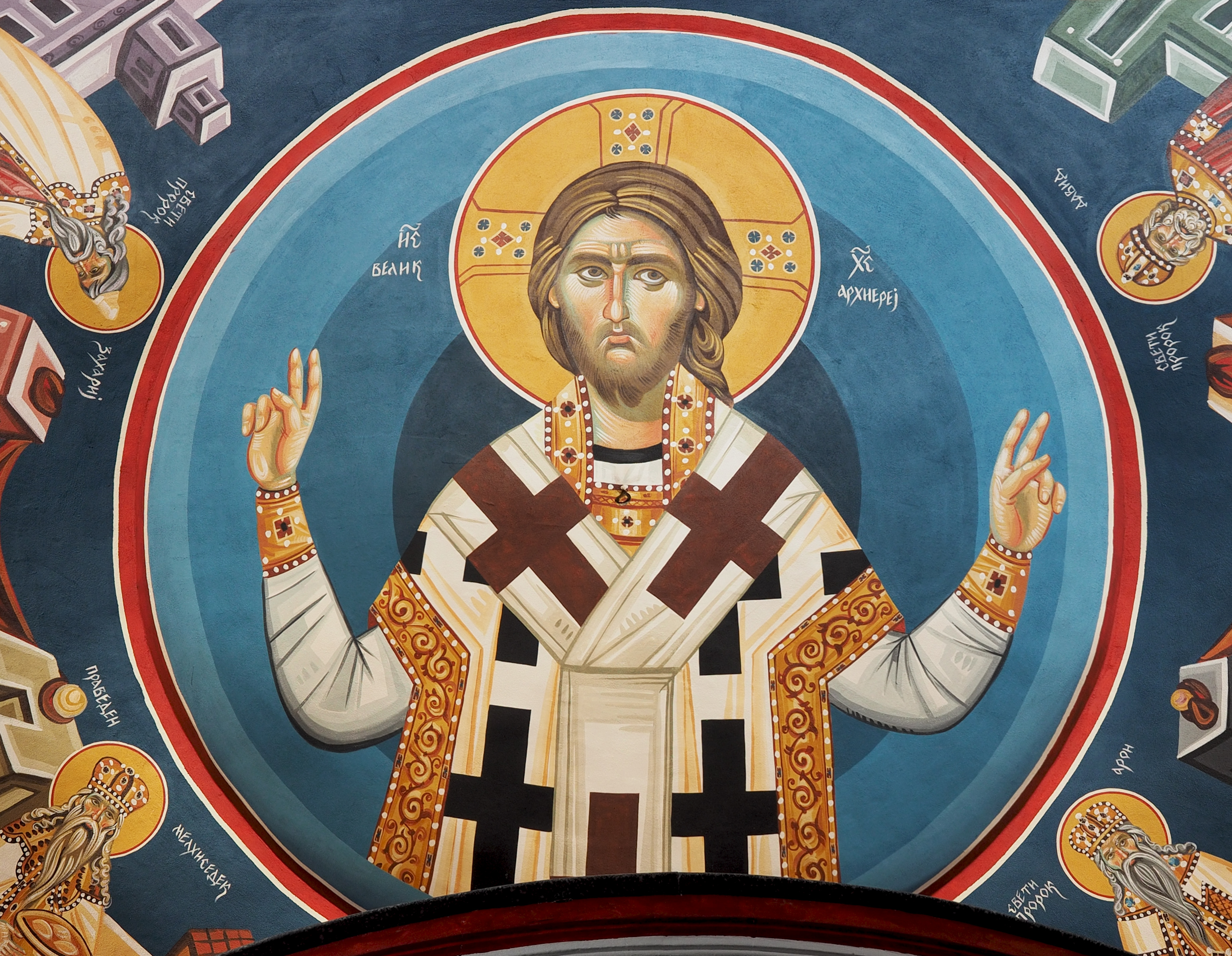
A Pantokrator in the Church of the Nativity of the Virgin Mary in Bitola

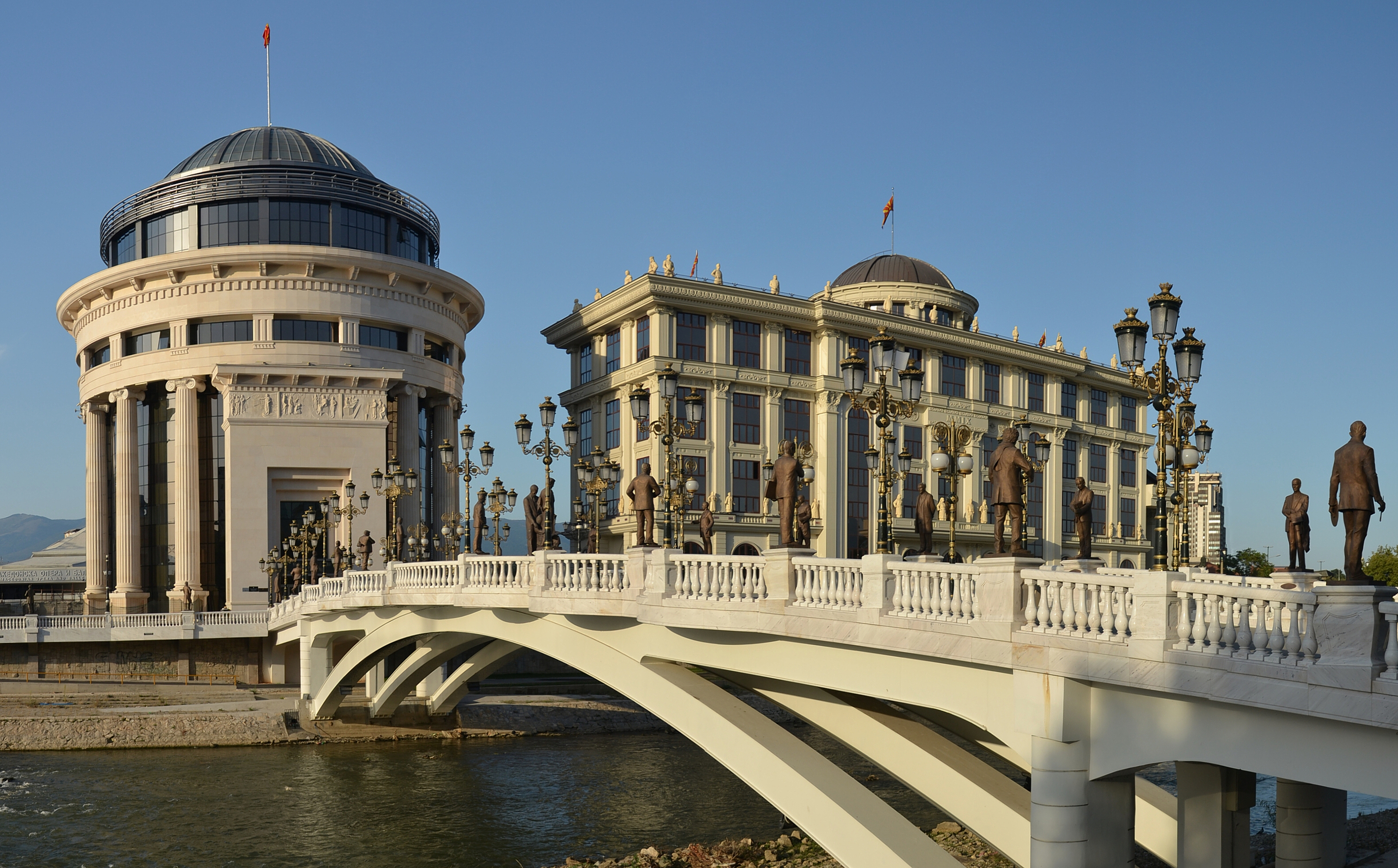
The Bridge of Art across the Vardar River in Skopje

The culture of North Macedonia is the culture of the Republic of North Macedonia, a country in Southeast Europe. Macedonian culture has contributed to the culture of the Balkans, and the wider culture of the European continent.

== Architecture ==
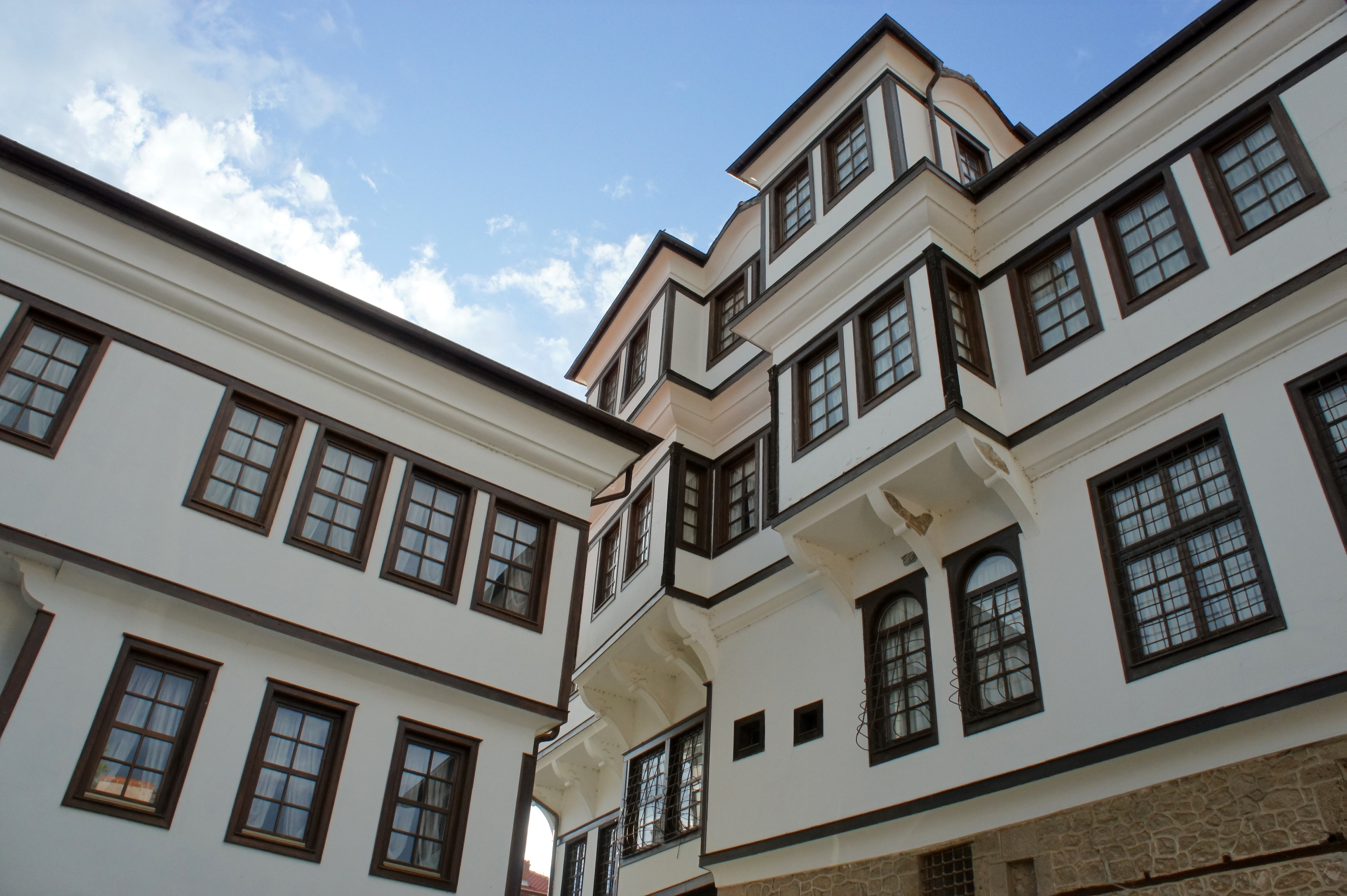
The house of Robevci, typical Macedonian architecture

Sites for archaeology of extraordinary quality include those at Stobi in Gradsko, Heraclea Lyncestis in Bitola, Lychnidos, the Church of St. Sophia in Ohrid, and Scupi in Skopje. Terracotta icons were discovered at Viničko Kale (near Vinica). The Basilica Mosaic in Heraklea Lynkestis is an early Byzantine mosaic. There are many remains from Roman times and the early Christian period in Vardar Macedonia, which was at the time part of the Bulgarian Empire.

Famous architects and fresco-painters worked on numerous churches in North Macedonia, and in Ohrid alone there are over thirty churches. UNESCO has declared that the city of Ohrid and its lake must be protected, as they are important to the history of the world. Several churches, the most renowned among which is St. Pantelejmon, bear witness to the times of the educator St. Clement and in 1990 work on the Cathedral of Saint Clement of Ohrid in Skopje was completed. Along with other cultural monuments the 11th- and 12th-century churches of Western medieval thema Bulgaria are famous throughout the world, characterized by unique architecture and priceless frescoes and icons.

Monuments of Islamic culture such as mosques, bazaars and baths from the Ottoman Age have been discovered. In the 14th century, Skopje was described as being an important trading center with its Old Bazaar, Covered Marketplace (Bezisten), the Kuršumli An Caravanserai, Daut Pasha Baths and the Mustapha Pasha Mosque. Another important monument of Islamic culture in Vardar Macedonia is the Painted Mosque in Tetovo. A large number of monuments were erected after the liberation of the city. One of the most interesting monuments erected following the region's liberation is the memorial devoted to the Ilinden-Preobrazhenie Uprising in Kruševo. Other memorials renowned for their beauty and expressiveness can be found in Prilep, Kumanovo, Veles and Štip.

== Art ==
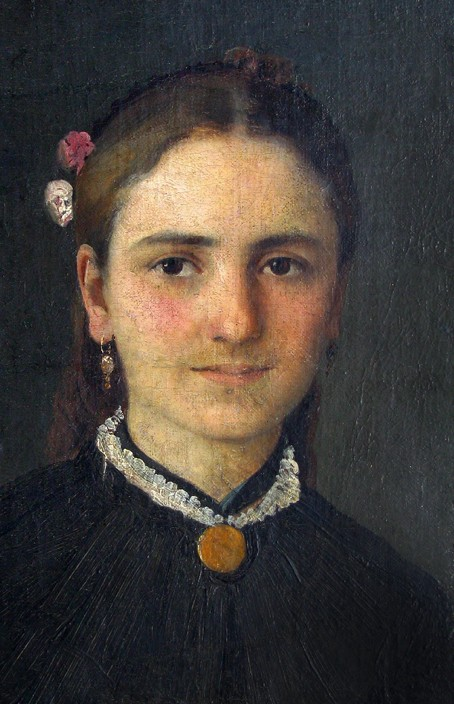
Woman's portrait by Đorđe Zografski

The founders of modern Macedonian painting included Lazar Ličenoski, Nikola Martinoski, Dimitar Avramovski–Pandilov, and Vangel Kodzoman. They were succeeded by an exceptionally talented and fruitful generation, consisting of Borka Lazeski, Dimitar Kondovski, Petar Mazev who are now deceased, and Rodoljub Anastasov and many others who are still active. Vasko Taskovski's work was presented to the Paris public in 1992 with an imposing exhibition and auction of about 100 works. Vangel Naumovski, who was long classified by art historians as a Naive artist, is well known for his Ohridska Porta Gallery, as well as for the original world of his paintings. Kiril Efremov developed a surreal-fantastic world in which elements of New Figuration and symbolic expression merge (“Integral Image”).

Contemporary Macedonian artists include Aleksandar Stankovski, Zhaneta Vangeli, Maja Dzhartovska, and Gordana Apostolovska who all use various styles.

In addition to Dimo Todorovski, who is considered to be the founder of modern Macedonian sculpture, the works of Petar Hadzi Boskov, Boro Mitrikeski, Novak Dimitrovski and Tome Serafimovski are also outstanding. The Museum of Contemporary Art and the Art Gallery in the Daut Pasha Baths are considered the best galleries. In 1993 there were 413 exhibitions visited by over 240,000 people, 12 artists' colonies with 120 participants, of whom 40 were foreign painters and sculptors.

== Cinema ==
The history of film making in North Macedonia dates back over 110 years. The first film to be produced on the territory of the present-day country was made in 1895 by Aromanian filmmakers Janaki and Milton Manaki in Bitola, beginning a filmmaking tradition in the region that continues to this day.

Throughout the past century, the medium of film has depicted the history, culture and everyday life of the Macedonian people. Over the years many Macedonian films have been presented at film festivals around the world and several of these films have won prestigious awards. The most famous Macedonian director is Milčo Mančevski, whose debut feature film Before the Rain was nominated for an Academy Award. The highest grossing feature film in North Macedonia was Bal-Can-Can, having been seen by over 500,000 people in its first year alone.

== Music ==
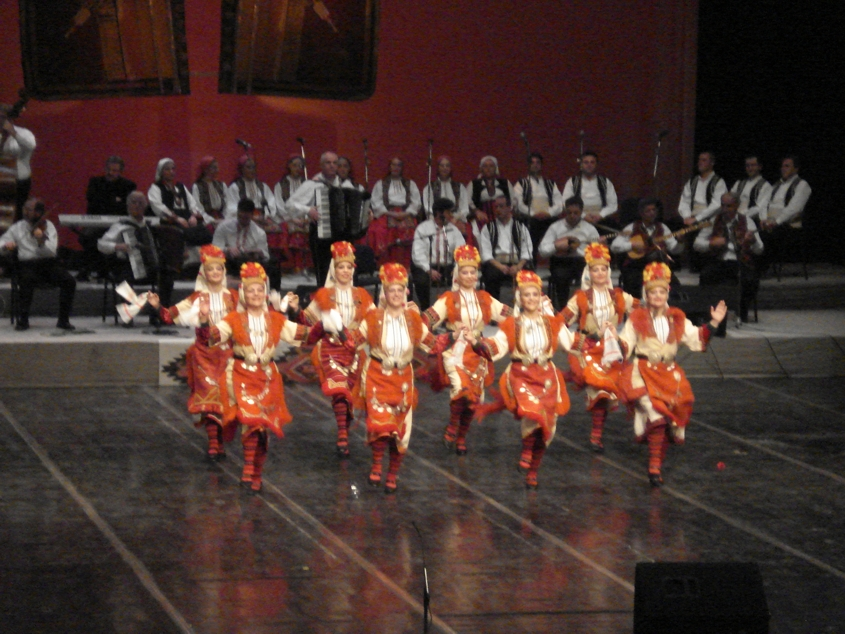
Female folk dance, Tresenica, performed by Tanec

North Macedonia has an exceptionally rich musical heritage. The studies of Sotir Golabovski and Octoechos concerning the tradition of Macedonian spiritual and church choir hymns are a significant contribution to Macedonian and Balkan cultural history. The Composer's Association of Macedonia currently has 60 members. After the 1st generation of modern Macedonian classical music, consisting of Trajko Prokopiev, Todor Skalovski, Stefan Gajdov, Petre Bogdanov Kocko and Zivko Firfov, came the work of the composers Kiril Makedonski, Gligor Smokvarski, Vlastimir Nikolovski, Toma Prosev, Tomislav Zografski, Mihailo Nikolovski, Ljubomir Brangolica, Stojan Stojkov, Risto Avramovski, Tome Mancev, Dimitrije Bužarovski and Goce Kolarovski.

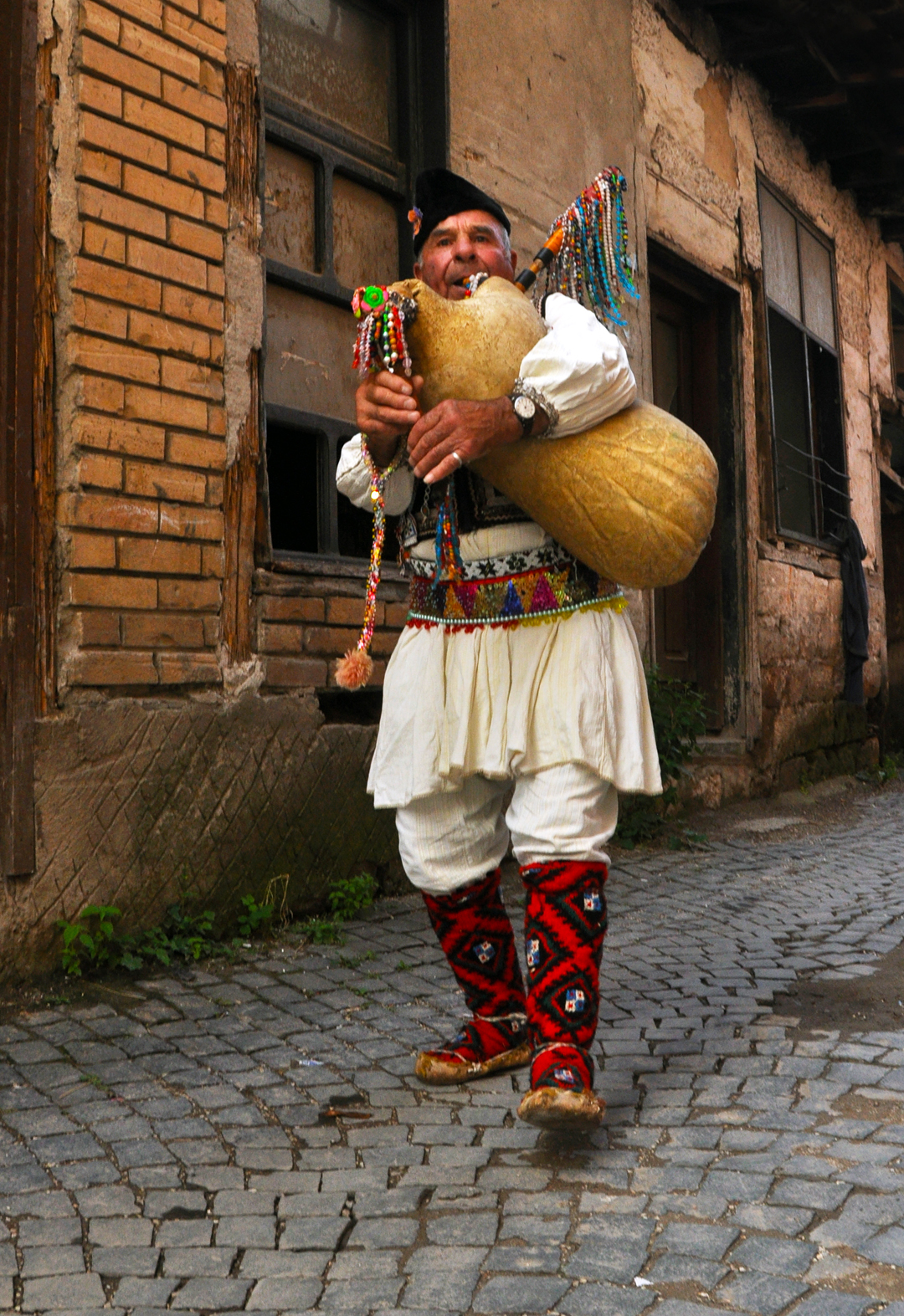
Macedonian gajda player

The Macedonian Philharmonic Orchestra, established in 1944 in the People's Republic of Macedonia, is the oldest cultural institution in the field of music. There are six chamber ensembles, such as Tanec, that represent the richness of Macedonian folklore and songs, and there are ten other folklore ensembles that are active. There are three professional and twenty amateur choirs. Each year about 50,000 people attend concerts of the Macedonian Philharmonic Orchestra and the various folk dance ensembles and other cultural and artistic associations. In addition to the concerts held as part of the Ohrid Summer Festival, an annual festival of classical music named Interfest was established in Bitola a few years ago. The Skopje Jazz Festival has become a highly prestigious music event. Many of the most renowned jazz groups and names in the world of jazz have taken part in the festival, and in concept and atmosphere, participants and critics consider it one of the most successful jazz festivals around the world.

Folk music is one of the most cherished areas of Macedonian culture, and several folk festivals take place each year. The oldest is Folkfest, held in Valandovo, and most festivals have greater turnouts among communities of ethnic Macedonians in Australia and Canada. The Festival of Old Town Songs in Ohrid and the Ilinden Days of Folk Song in Bitola are events that celebrate traditional Macedonian songs. Mak-Fest in Stip and the Skopje Festival are the two best-known festivals of popular music in North Macedonia.

The rock group Leb i Sol, with its original music infusing traditional folk themes and rhythms with modern influence, has been active for over twenty years and has become widely known both inside and outside North Macedonia.

== Theatre ==
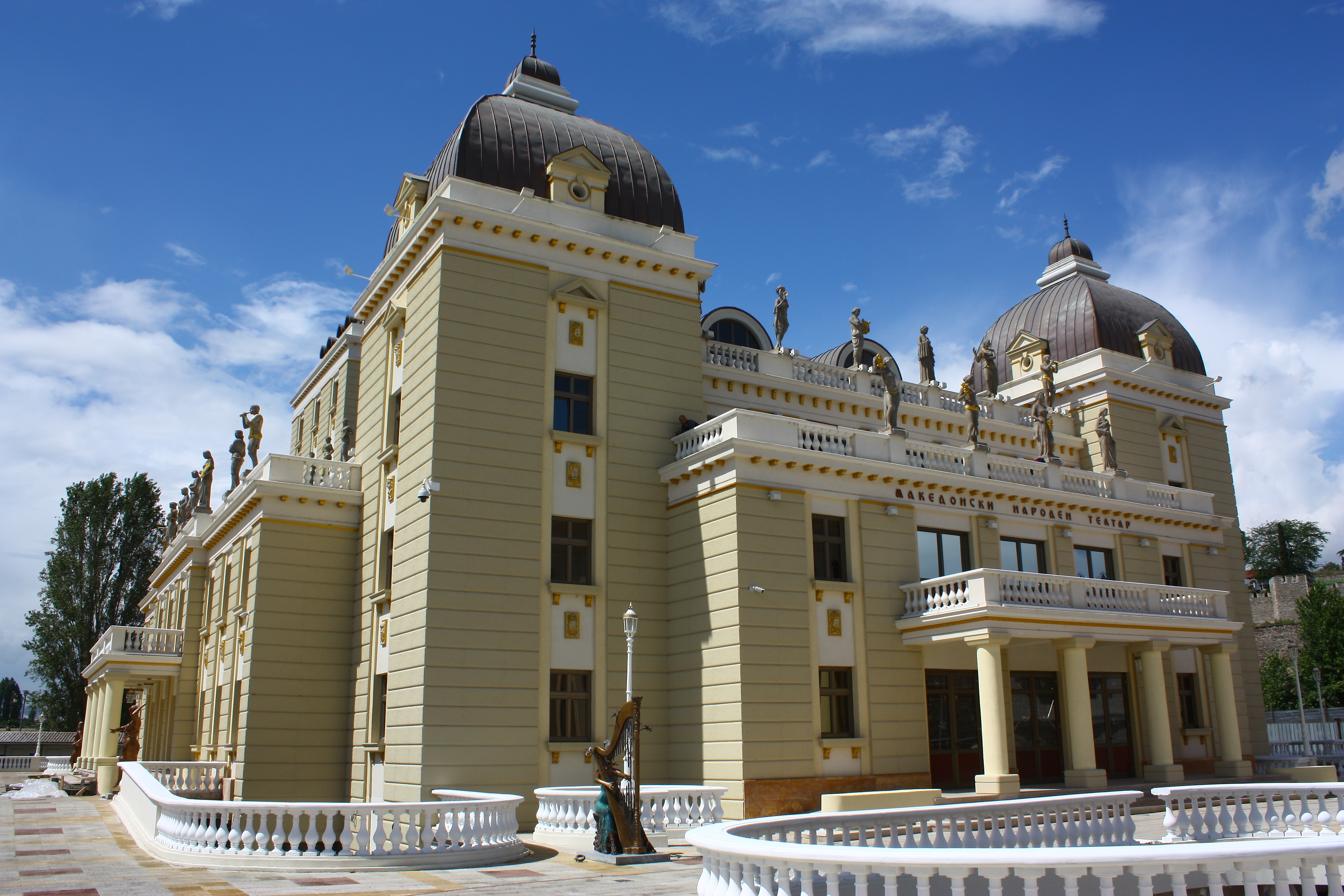
Macedonian National Theatre in Skopje

There are 13 professional theatres in North Macedonia. From 1993–1994 1,596 performances were held in the newly formed republic, and more than 330,000 people attended. The Macedonian National Theatre (Drama, Opera and Ballet companies), the Drama Theatre, the Theatre of the Nationalities (Albanian and Turkish Drama companies) and the other theatre companies comprise about 870 professional actors, singers, ballet dancers, directors, playwrights, set and costume designers, etc. There is also a professional theatre for children and three amateur theatres. For the last thirty years a traditional festival of Macedonian professional theatres has been taking place in Prilep in honour of Vojdan Cernodrinski, the founder of the modern Macedonian theatre. Each year a festival of amateur and experimental Macedonian theatre companies is held in Kocani.

The word Karagöz is a Turkish word literally meaning "a black eye", but it is a specific type of theatre in North Macedonia as in many other Balkan countries. This picturesque, original and exceptionally popular theatre reached the Balkans from the Far East. Shifting slowly but surely from the Far East towards the Middle East, this type of theatre went through a transformation as it was passed along from person to person through many cultures. The Karagoz Theatre came to the Balkans together with the Ottoman Empire. In the history of ethnic Macedonian culture the name of this theatre was mentioned starting from the 11th, or at least the 14th century. A Turkish legend speaks about the origin of the construction of a large mosque in Bursa and its constructors among whom were two friends and storytellers known as Karagöz and Hadzivat. Instead of working, they sat and told comical stories to the workers. Their performances were so attractive to their audience that the construction of the mosque completely stopped - the construction site instead became a theatre. When the Sultan heard what had happened he became furious and ordered the execution of the two friends. Karagoz and Hadzivat were unable to escape their fate but the citizens of Bursa were overcome by grief at the loss of the two heroes. The Sultan realized his folly and tried to correct it by ordering the revival of the two men. Unable to actually give them life, the sultan kept them alive in the form of small, transparent puppets made of thin and colored skin. If they were to be placed in front of a white curtain with a burning candle behind it, they would dance as if they were alive and the sultan had redeemed himself.

Although this theatre includes a number of characters-puppets, its eminent theatricality emerges from the complex relation between its central masks of Karagoz and Hadzivat. Karagoz personifies an ordinary Greek in the Ottoman Empire. He is dressed simply as any other passers-by on the streets of Constantinople. He speaks plainly and in a language common to the people. He is clever and stupid at the same time, naive and witty. Although he is as poor as a dog, he desires only to eat his bread in without distraction or interference. Equally important is his teasing his constantly angry enemy, whose name is Hadzivat and who is a little bit slow, but not necessarily stupid. Hadzivat speaks conceitedly using archaic words, pretending to be wise and in actuality being a boringly pedant, rigid, corruptible, opportunist who constantly emphasizes his aristocratic origin. Karagoz Theatre is Turkish folk humor at its best. The famous Turkish traveler and diplomat, Evlija Celebija, traveled in the Balkans in the first half of the 17th century and wrote about his travels in ten books in which he discusses performances of Karagoz in Bosnia, Serbia, and in the republic's capital Skopje. Karagoz Theatre was brought to the region by the Ottoman Turks and easily adapted to the new environment, existing for centuries up to the 1950s.

== See also ==
- Cultural diversity
- History of North Macedonia
- List of Macedonian artists
- Sojuz na Izvidnici na Makedonija
- Struga Poetry Evenings
