= Dimitar =

Dimitar (Bulgarian: Димитър, Macedonian: Димитар, Russian: Димитыр) is a South Slavic masculine given name. It is widely found in Bulgaria and North Macedonia.

It's derived from one or more of the following:

- Saint Demetrius (280–306)
- Dimetor Διμήτωρ ("twice-born"), epithet of Dionysus referring to his reincarnation after dying as Zagreus
- Mitra, the Indo-Iranian solar god of friendship and promise
- Demeter, Greek mother goddess the name of which contains the Proto Indo-European root mater ("mother")

The most common short for Dimitar is Mitko, while people with the name Dimitar are informally called also Mite, Mito, Dimo, Dimi, Dimcho, Dimko, Dimka, Dime.

- Dimitar Agura (1849–1911), Bulgarian historian, professor of history at Sofia University and rector of the university
- Dimitar Andonovski (born 1985), Macedonian singer
- Dimitar Nikolov Asenov (1840–1868), better known as Hadzhi Dimitar, Bulgarian voivode and revolutionary
- Dimitar Avramovski–Pandilov (1899–1963), Macedonian painter
- Dimitar Berbatov (born 1981), Bulgarian footballer
- Dimitar Blagoev (1856–1924), Bulgarian political leader, the founder of Bulgarian socialism
- Dimitar Bosnov (1933–2012), Bulgarian football defender
- Dimitar Buynozov (1935–1995), Bulgarian actor
- Dimitar Dimitrov (football manager) (born 1959), Bulgarian football coach and manager of FC Amkar Perm
- Dimitar Dimitrov (Republic of Macedonia) (born 1937), philosopher, writer, journalist, and diplomat from the Republic of North Macedonia
- Dimitar Dimitrov (volleyball player) (born 1952), Bulgarian former volleyball player
- Dimitar Dimov (1909–1966), Bulgarian dramatist, novelist, and veterinary surgeon
- Dimitar Dobrev (wrestler) (1931–2019), former Greco-Roman wrestler from Bulgaria
- Dimitar Furnadjiev, Bulgarian cellist
- Dimitar Ganev (1898–1964), Bulgarian communist politician
- Dimitar Grekov (1847–1901), Bulgarian politician and Prime Minister
- Dimitar Iliev (footballer born 1988), Bulgarian football forward
- Dimitar Iliev (footballer born 1986), Bulgarian football defender
- Dimitar Iliev Popov (1927–2015), leading Bulgarian judge and Prime Minister
- Dimitar Ilievski-Murato (1953–1989), alpinist from the Republic of North Macedonia
- Dimitar Inkiow (1932–2006), Bulgarian writer
- Dimitar Isakov (born 1924), Bulgarian retired footballer
- Dimitar Ivankov (born 1975), Bulgarian football goalkeeper
- Dimitar Ivanov Makriev (born 1984), Bulgarian footballer
- Dimitar Ivanov Popov (1894–1975), Bulgarian organic chemist and an academician of the Bulgarian Academy of Sciences
- Dimitar Khlebarov (1934–2009), retired pole vaulter from Bulgaria
- Dimitar Koemdzhiev (born 1978), Bulgarian footballer
- Dimitar Kondovski (1927–1993), Macedonian painter
- Dimitar Nakov (born 1980), Bulgarian footballer
- Dimitar Nenov (1901–1953), Bulgarian classical pianist, composer, music pedagogue and architect
- Dimitar Obshti, 19th-century Bulgarian revolutionary
- Dimitar Penev (1945–2026), Bulgarian football player and coach
- Dimitar Peshev (1894–1973), Deputy Speaker of the National Assembly of Bulgaria and Minister of Justice during World War II
- Dimitar Petkov (1856–1907), leading member of the Bulgarian People's Liberal Party; Prime Minister (assassinated)
- Dimitar Petkov (footballer) (born 1987), Bulgarian footballer
- Dimitar Popgeorgiev (1840–1907), Bulgarian revolutionary from Macedonia
- Dimitar Popov (born 1970), Bulgarian football goalkeeper
- Dimitar Rangelov (born 1983), Bulgarian football striker
- Dimitar Rizov, Bulgarian revolutionary, publicist, politician, journalist and diplomat
- Dimitar Shtilianov (born 1976), boxer from Bulgaria
- Dimitar Spisarevski (1916–1943), Bulgarian fighter pilot in World War II
- Dimitar Stanchov (1863–1940), Bulgarian politician, acting Prime Minister in 1907
- Dimitar Stoyanov (politician) (born 1983), Bulgarian and EU politician
- Dimitar Talev (1898–1966), Bulgarian writer and journalist
- Dimitar Telkiyski (born 1977), Bulgarian football player
- Dimitar Vlahov (1878–1953), politician from the region of Macedonia
- Dimitar Vodenicharov (born 1987), Bulgarian football striker
- Dimitar Yakimov (born 1941), Bulgarian former footballer
- Dimitar Zlatanov (born 1948), former Bulgarian volleyball player
- Dimitar Zlatarev, Bulgarian terrorist
- Dimitar Zograf (1796–1860), 19th-century Bulgarian painter known for his icons

== See also ==
- Hadzhi Dimitar Stadium, multi-purpose stadium in Sliven, Bulgaria
