= Art Bridge =

Pedestrian bridge in Skopje, North Macedonia

Art Bridge Мост на уметноста
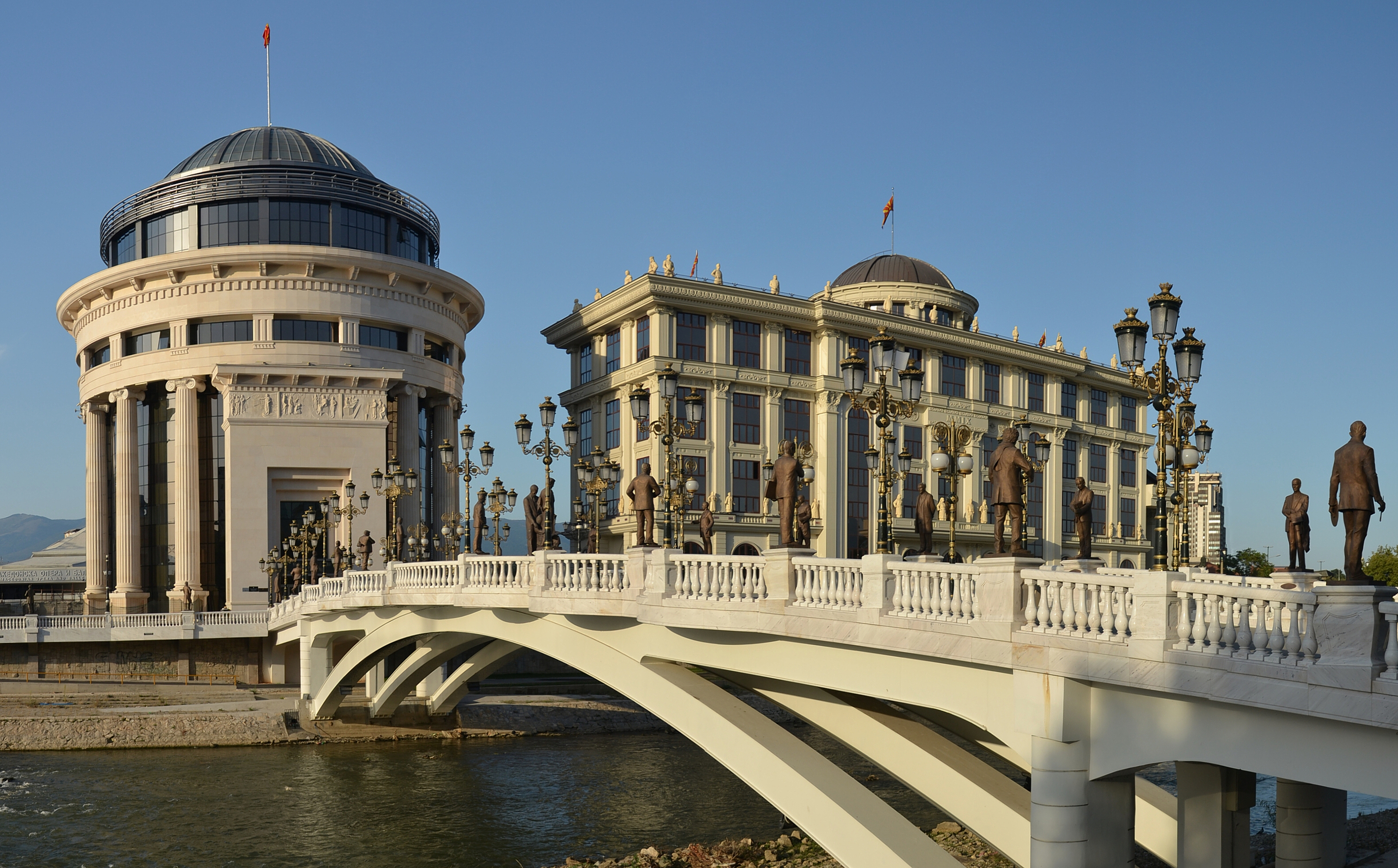
- Coordinates: 41.9958°N 21.4359°E
- Carries: Pedestrian only
- Crosses: Vardar River
- Locale: Skopje, North Macedonia

Characteristics
- Total length: 83 metres (272 ft)
- Width: 9.2 metres (30 ft) / 12 metres (39 ft)

History
- Designer: Kosta & Viktorija Mangarovski
- Construction cost: €2.5 million

Location
- Interactive map of Art Bridge

The Art Bridge (Macedonian: Мост на уметноста, romanized: Most na umetnosta, pronounced [mɔst na uˈmɛtnɔsta]) is a pedestrian bridge across the Vardar River in the centre of Skopje, the capital city of North Macedonia. The bridge features many statues of noted Macedonian artists and musicians. It was built as part of the larger Skopje 2014 project, with an estimated construction cost of €2.5 million. The bridge includes 29 sculptures, with 14 at each side and one in the centre. It is 83 metres (272 ft) in length and 9.2 metres (30 ft) in width, while the central part of the bridge is 12 metres (39 ft) wide.

== Statues ==
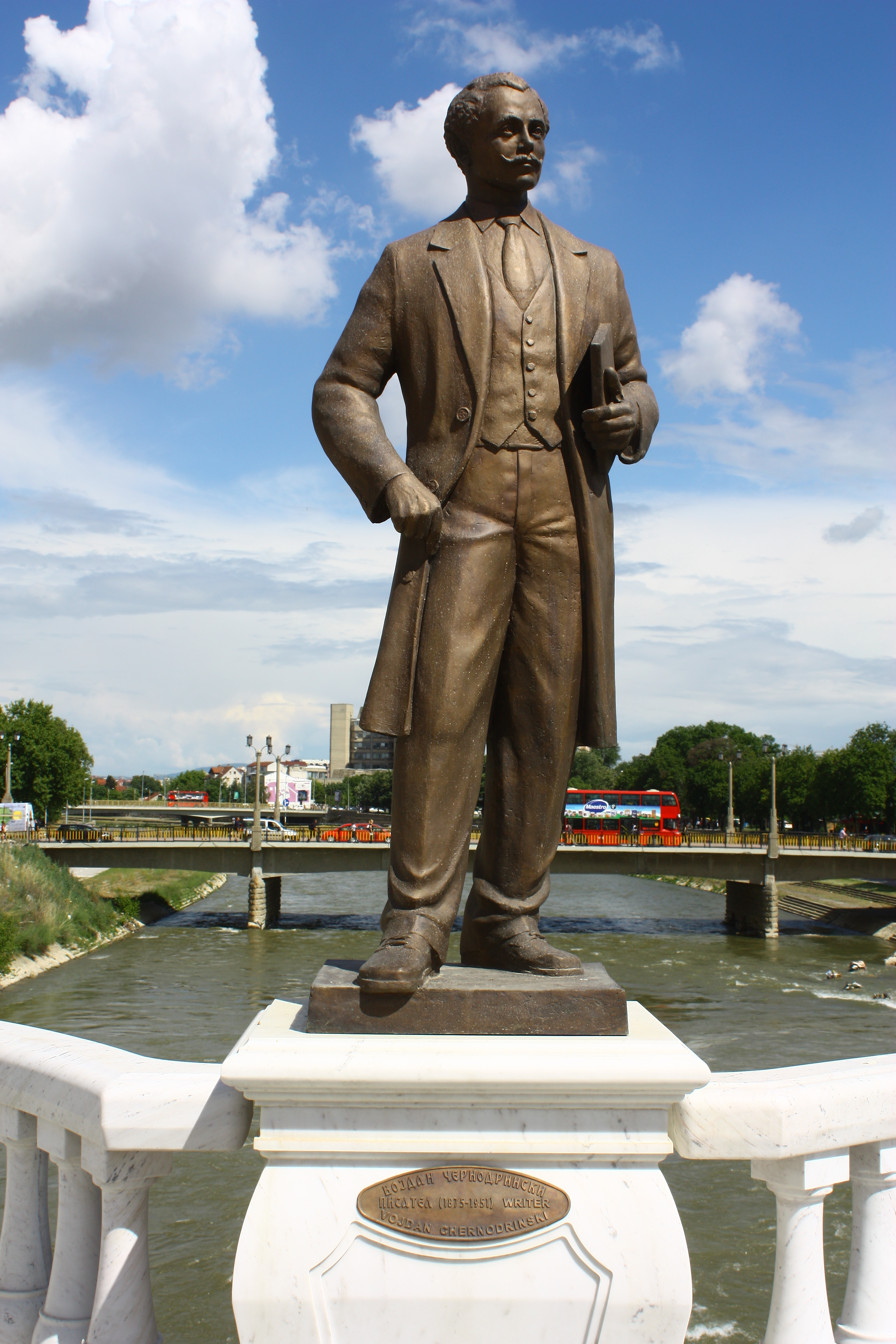
Vojdan Černodrinski

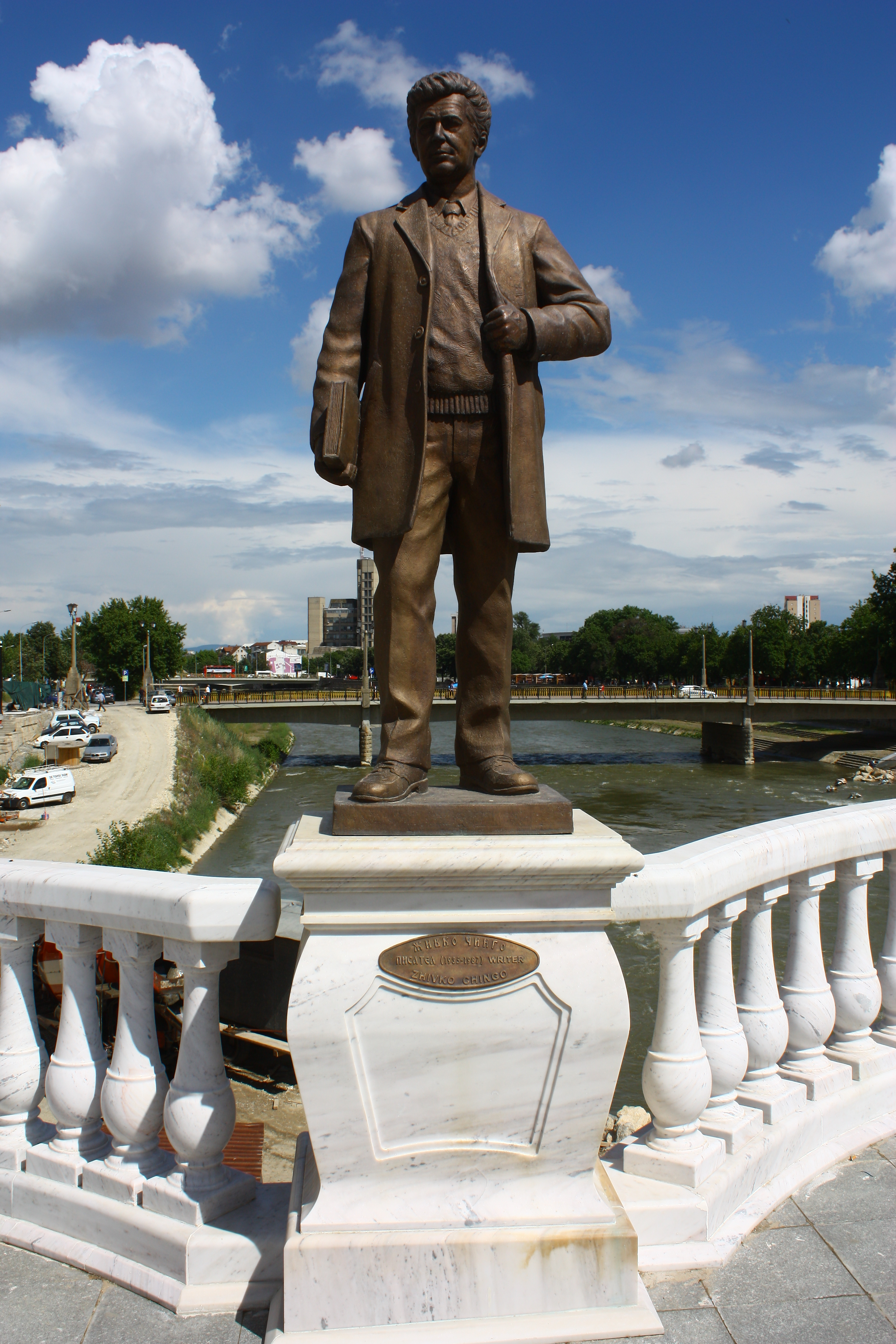
Živko Čingo

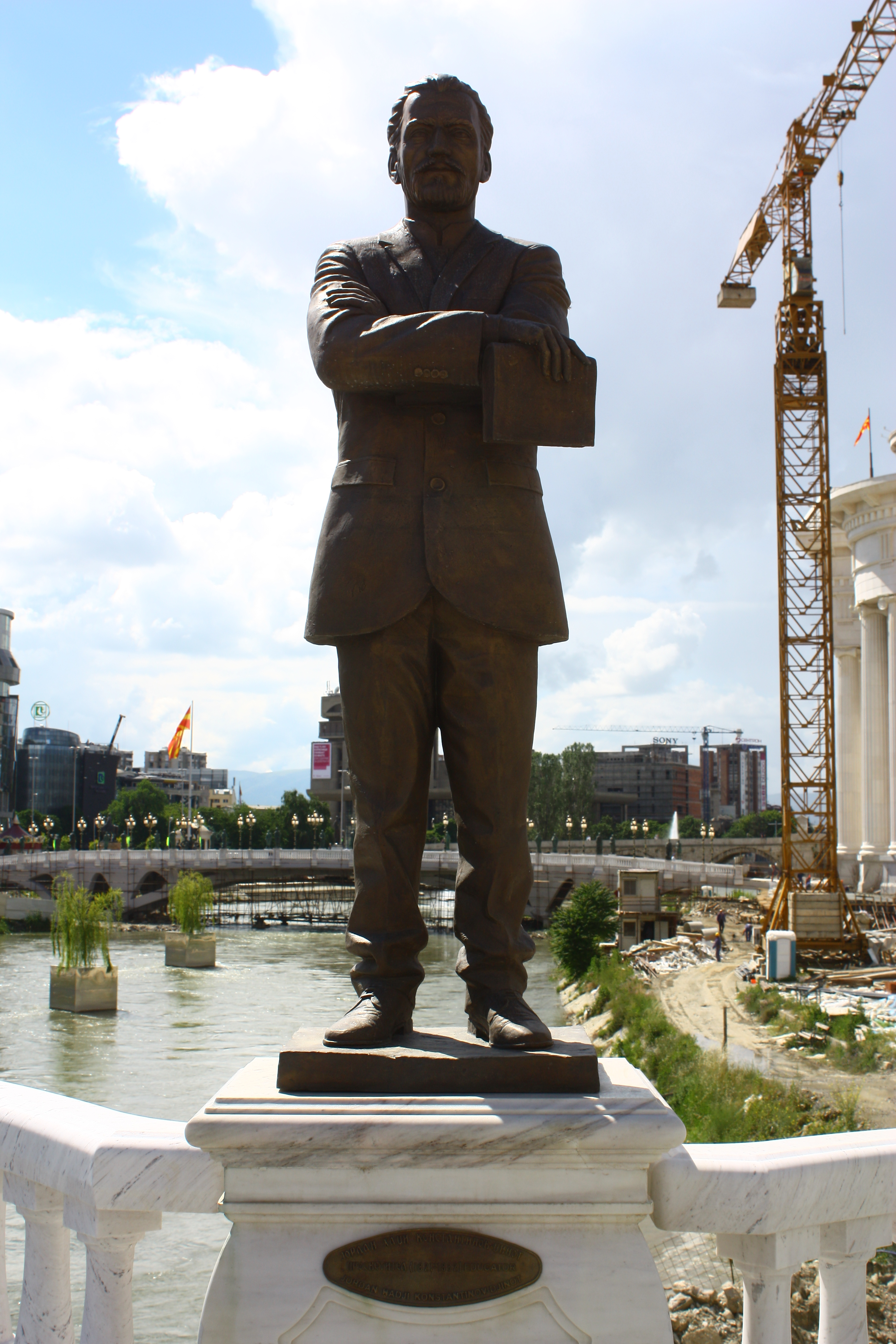
Jordan Džinot

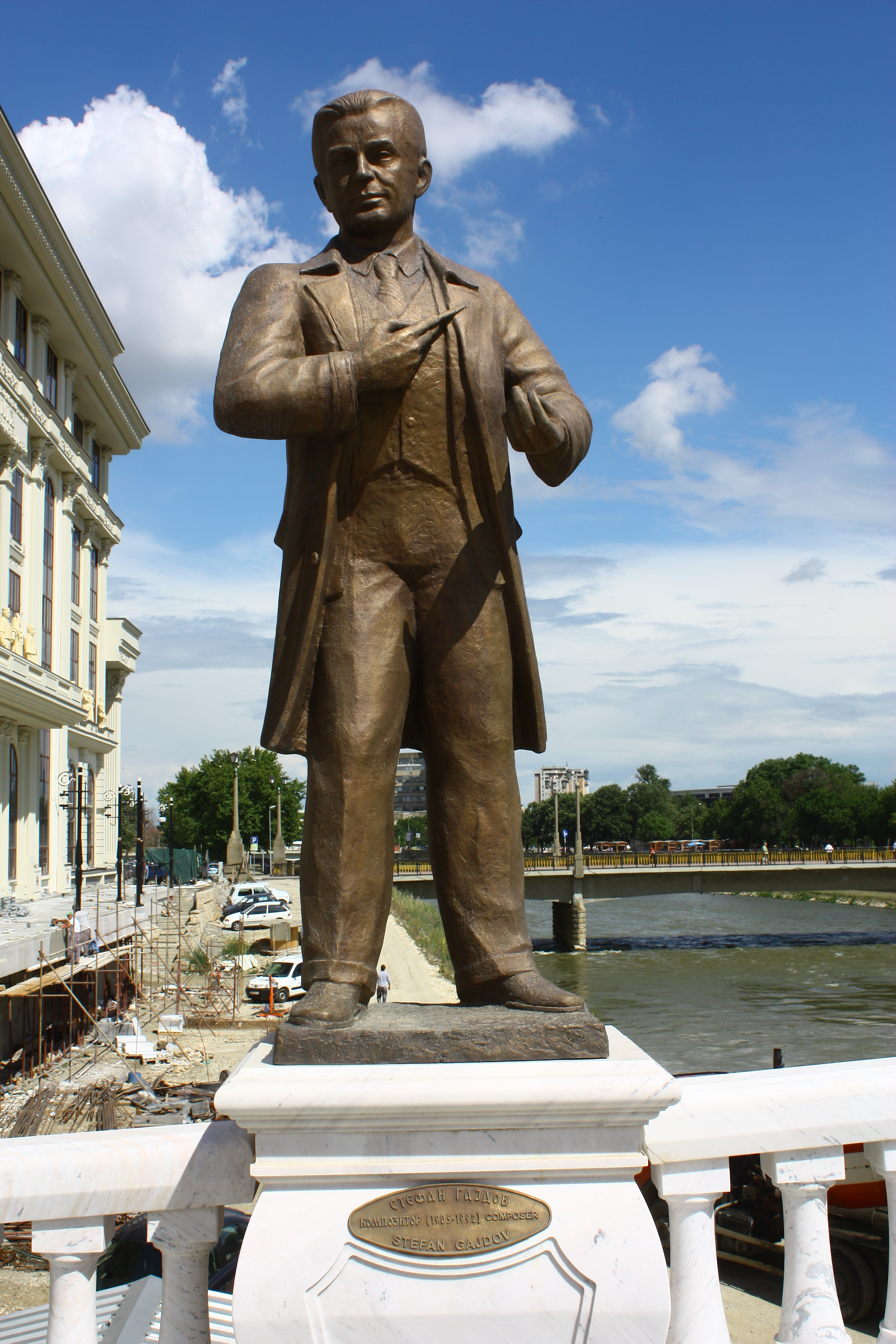
Stefan Gajdov

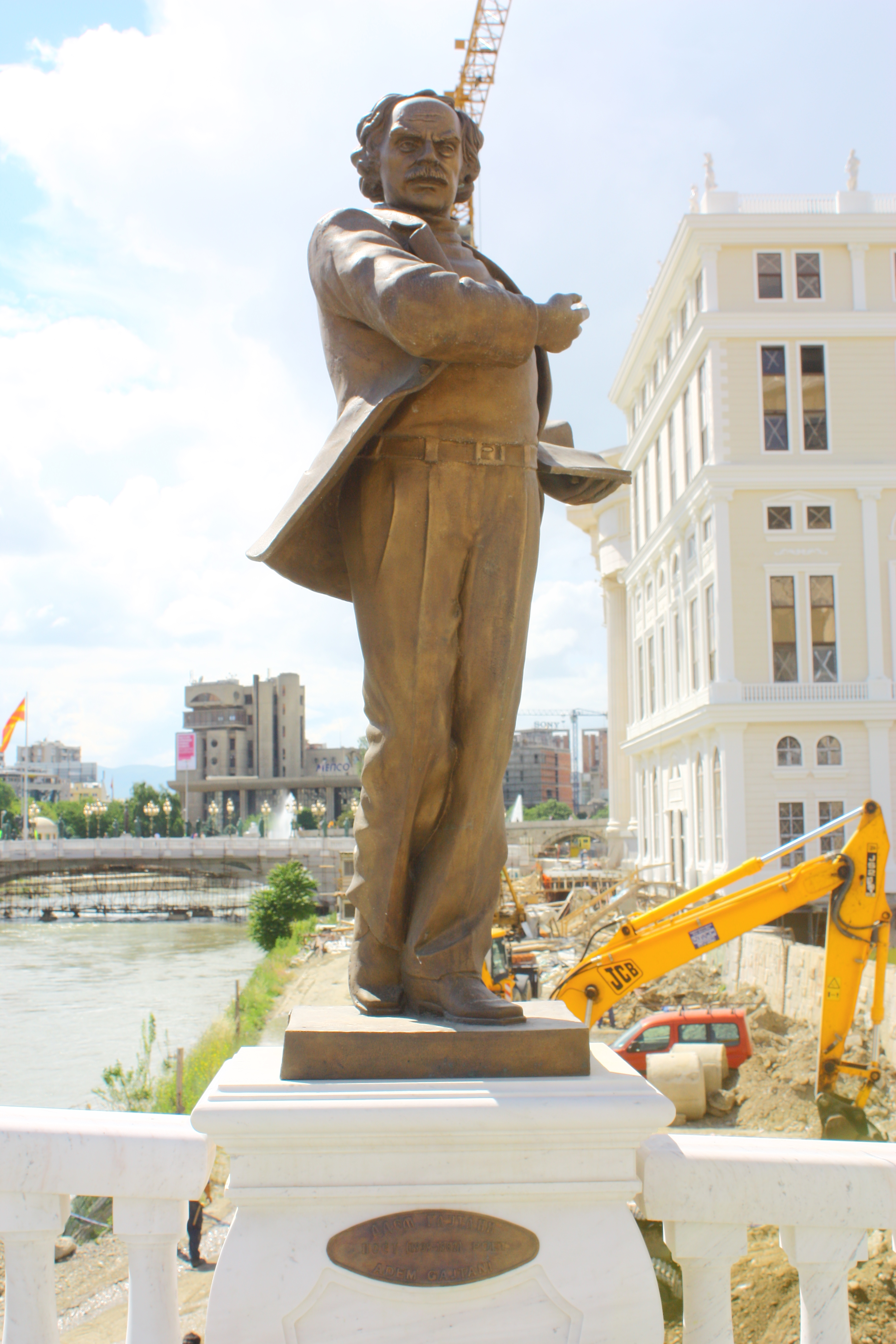
Adem Gajtani

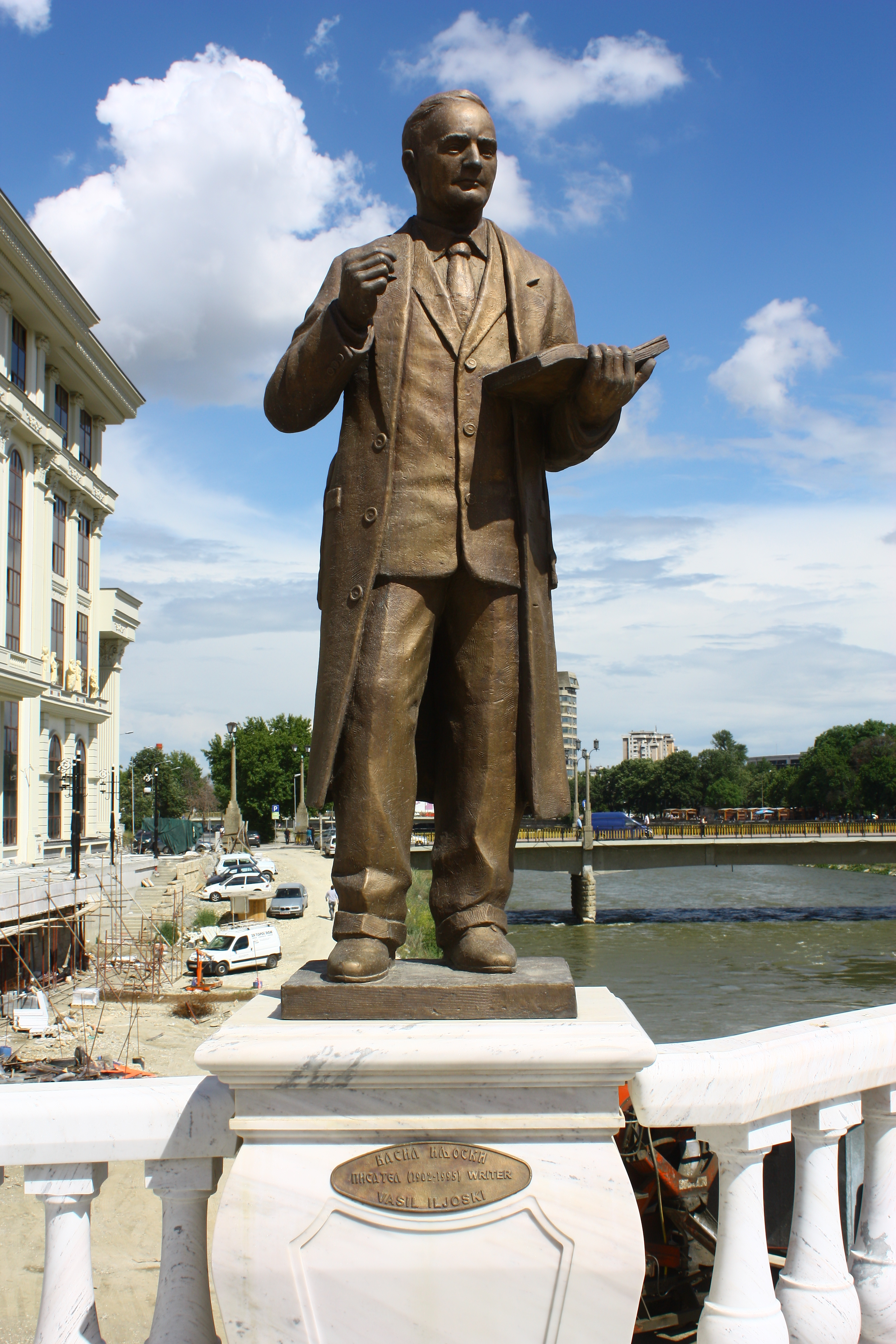
Vasil Iljoski

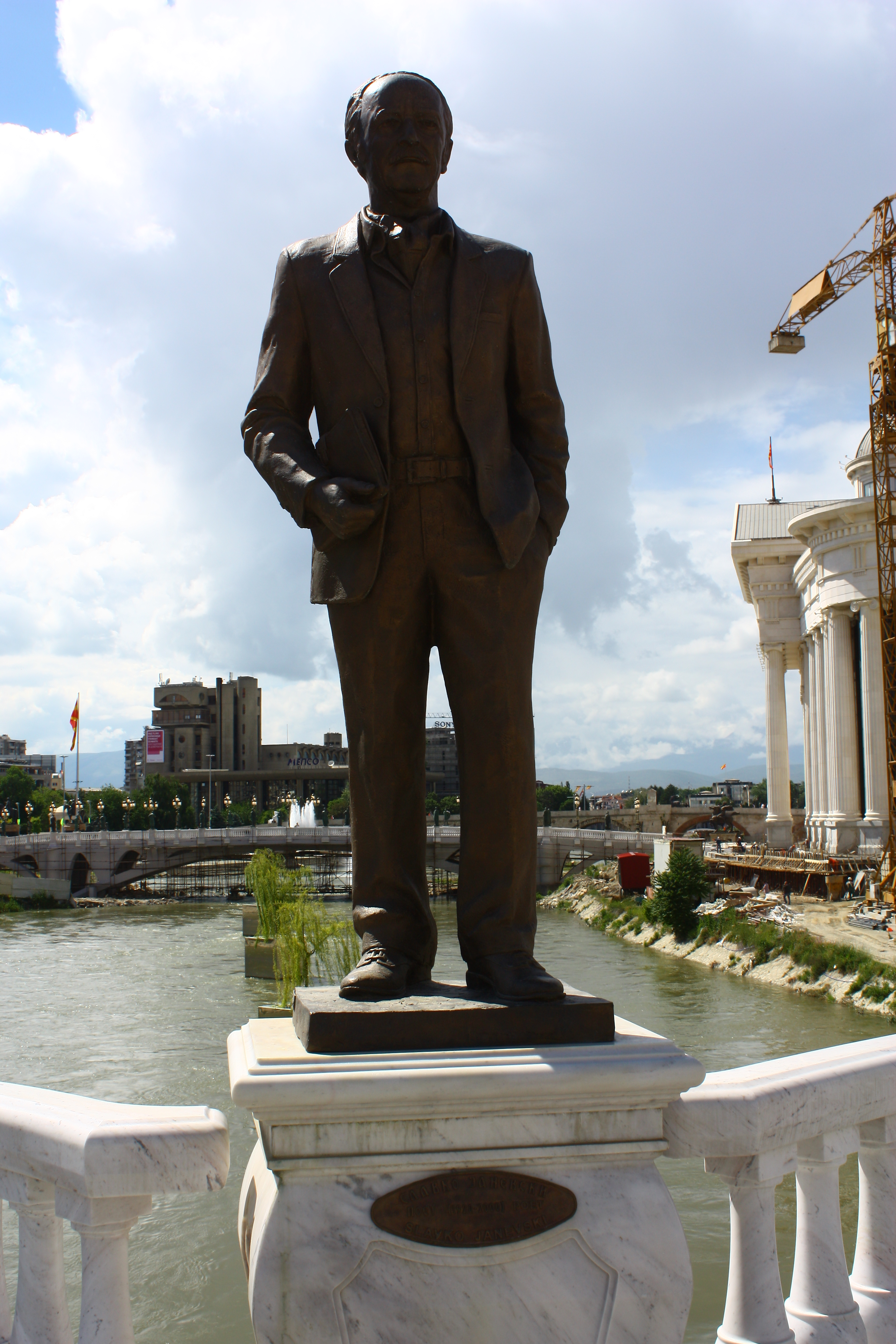
Slavko Janevski

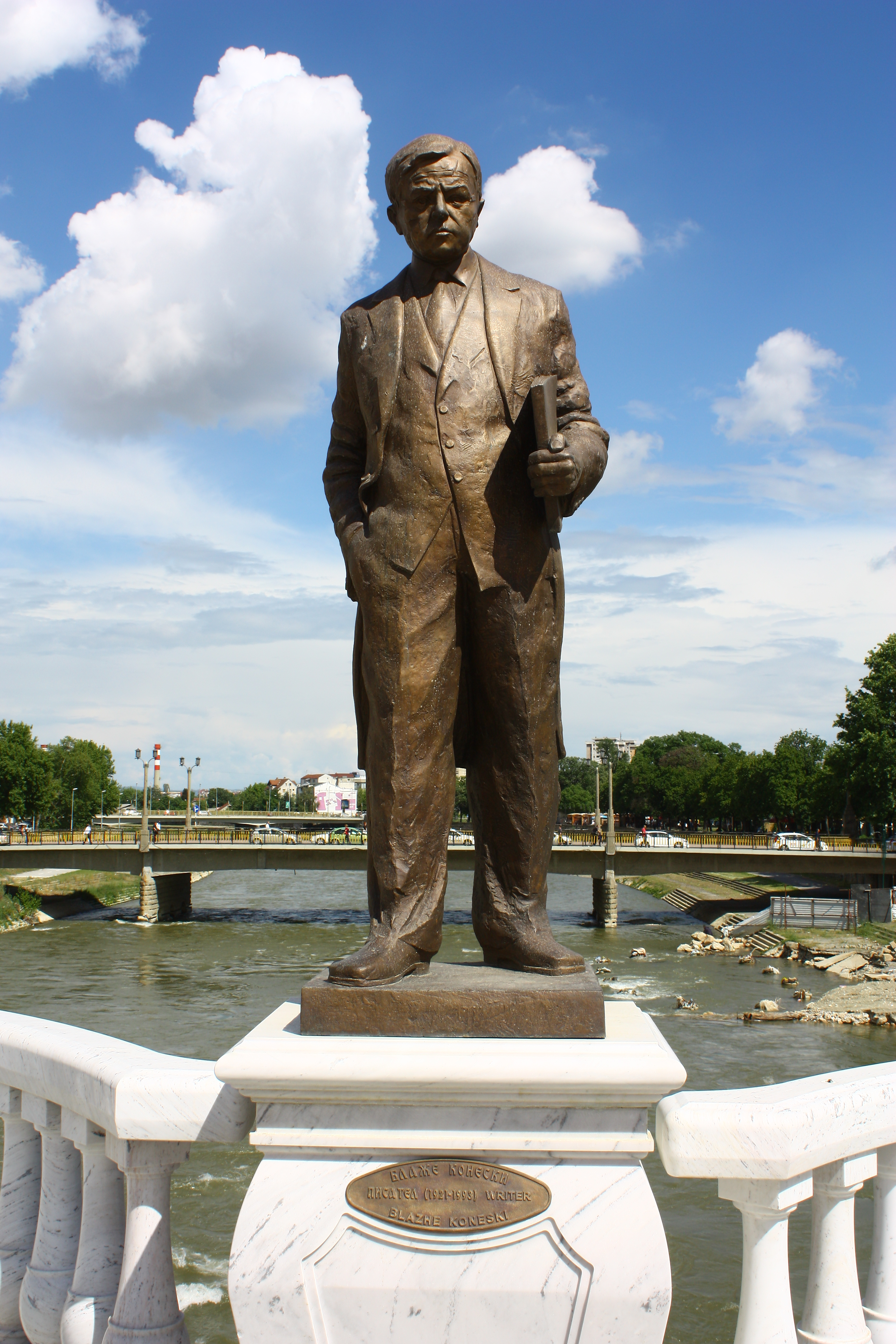
Blaže Koneski

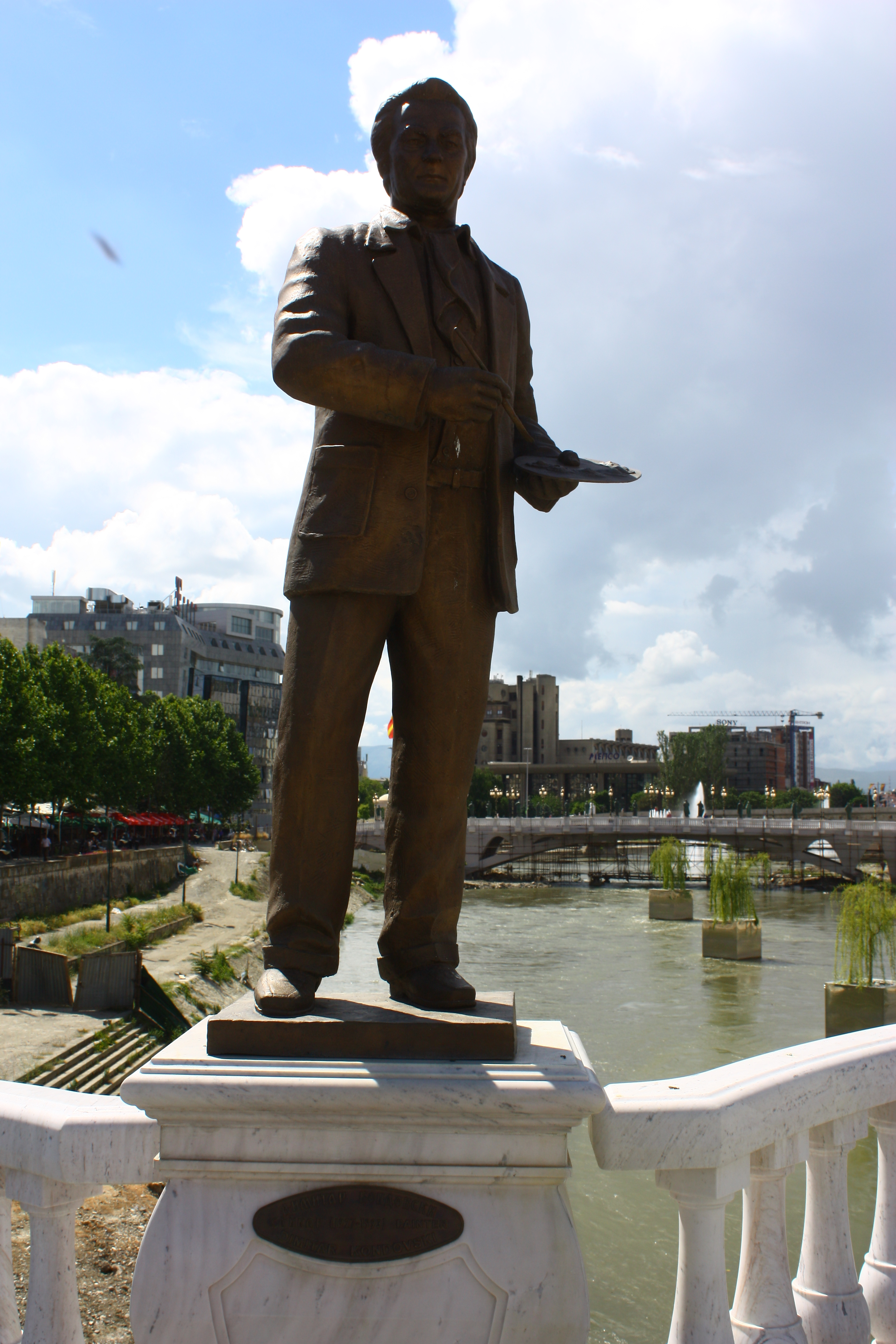
Dimitar Kondovski

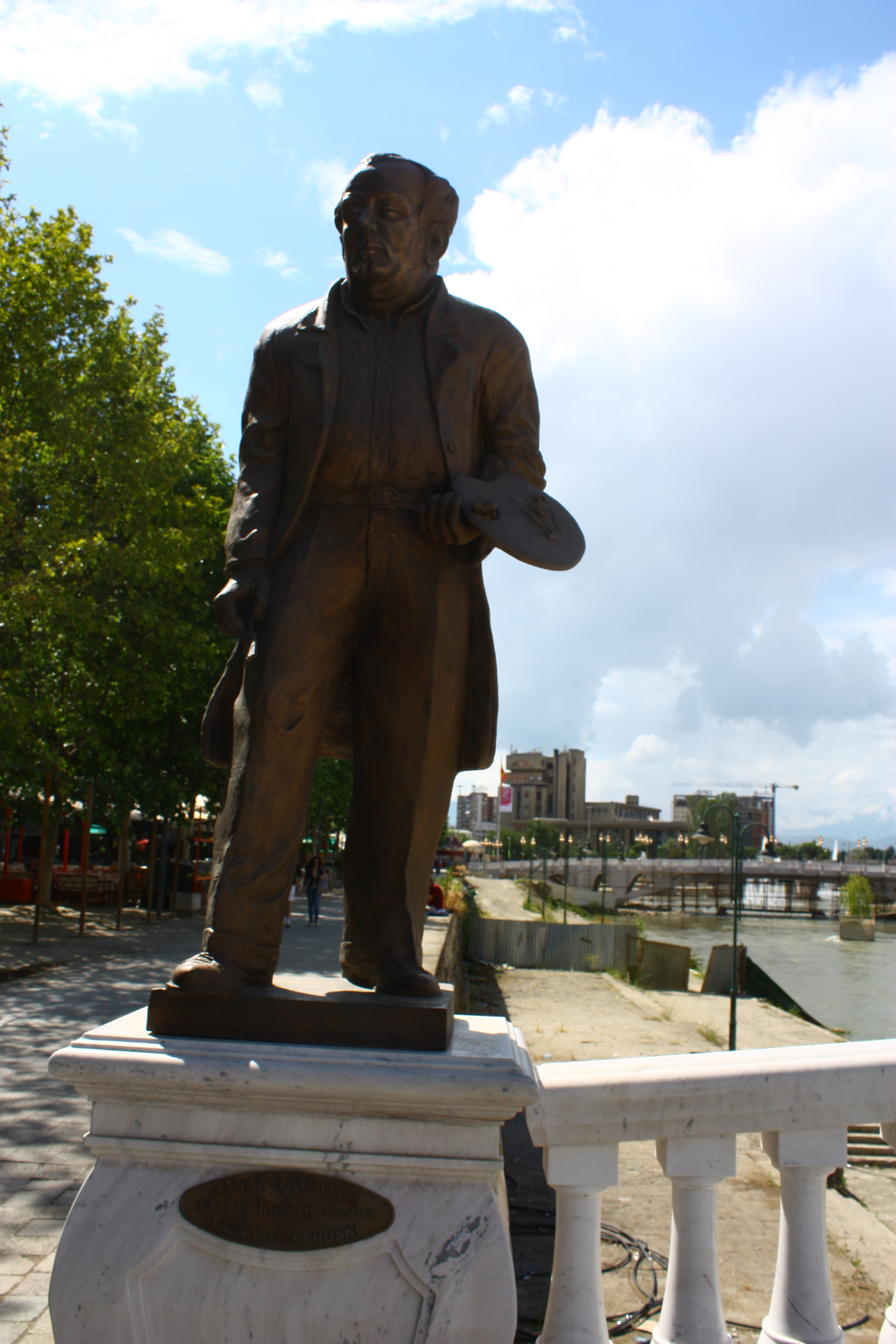
Lazar Ličenoski

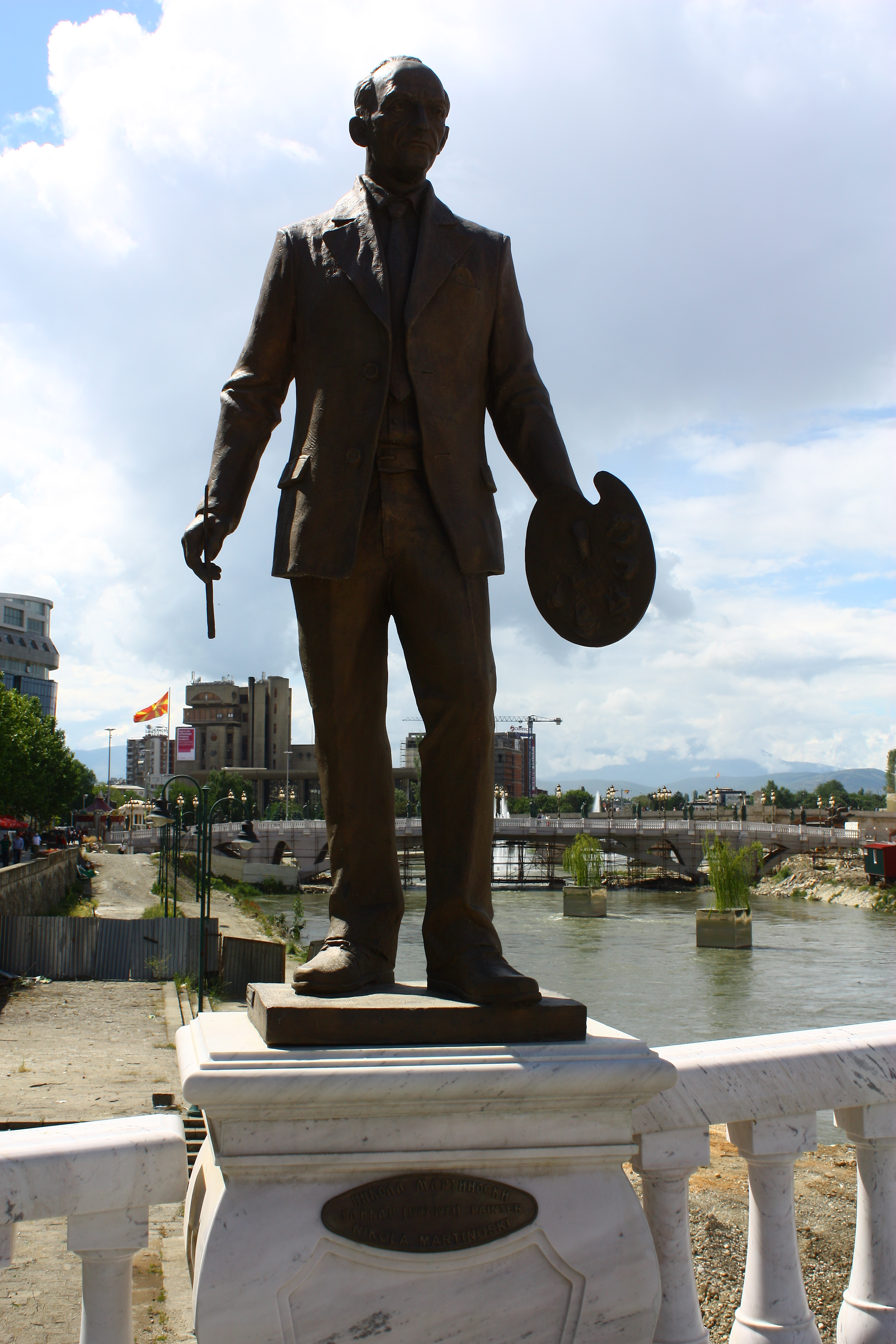
Nikola Martinoski

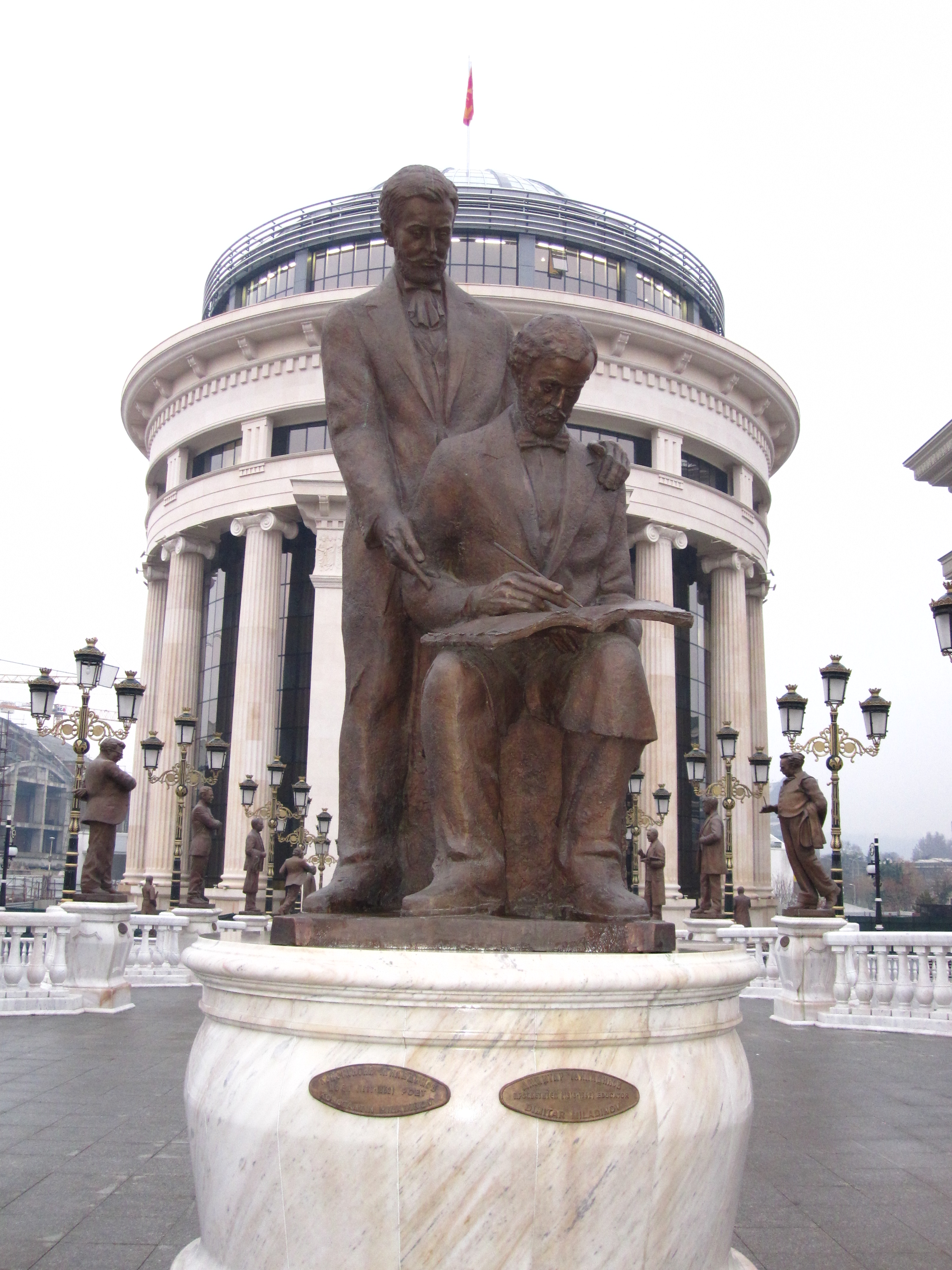
Miladinov Brothers

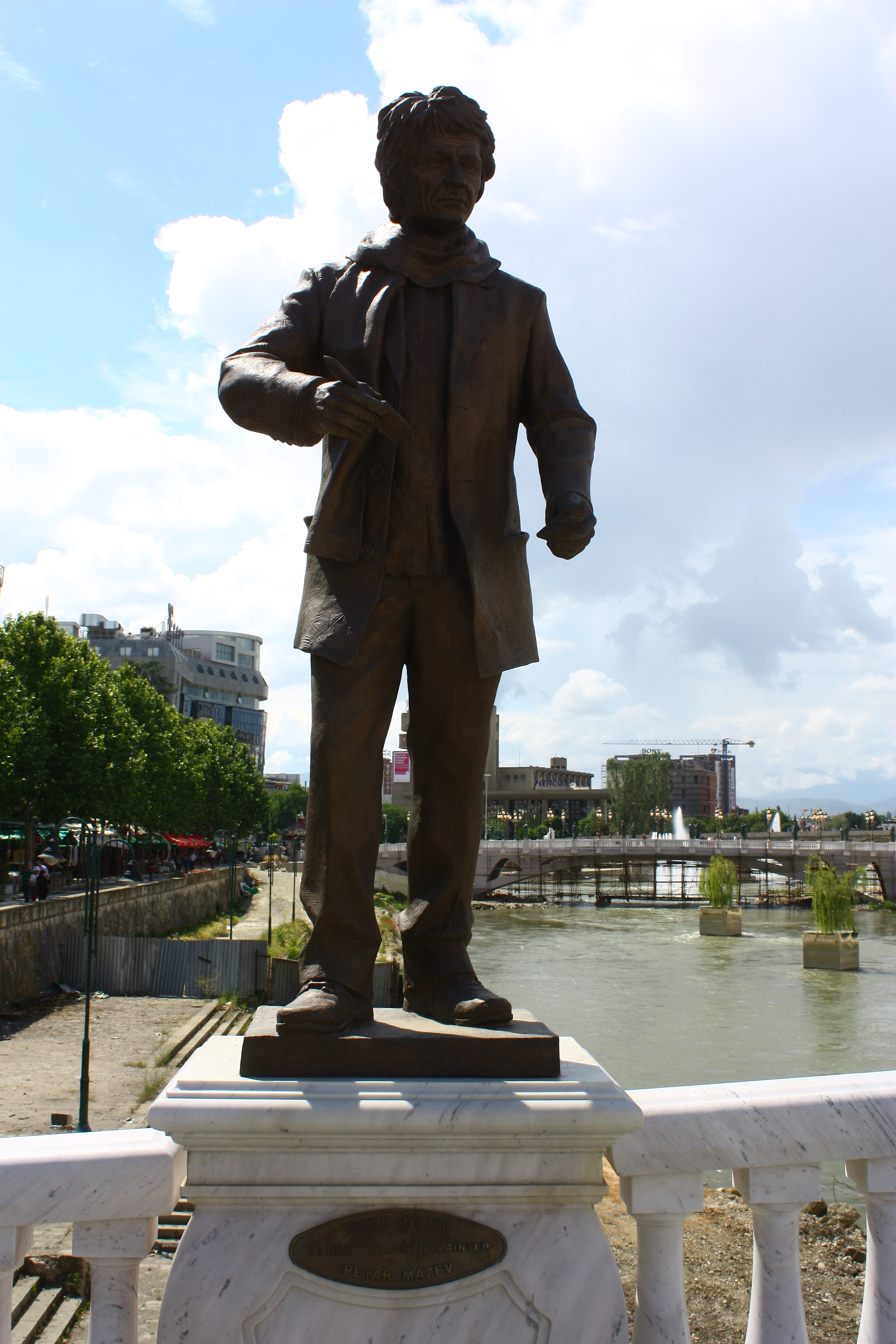
Petar Mazev

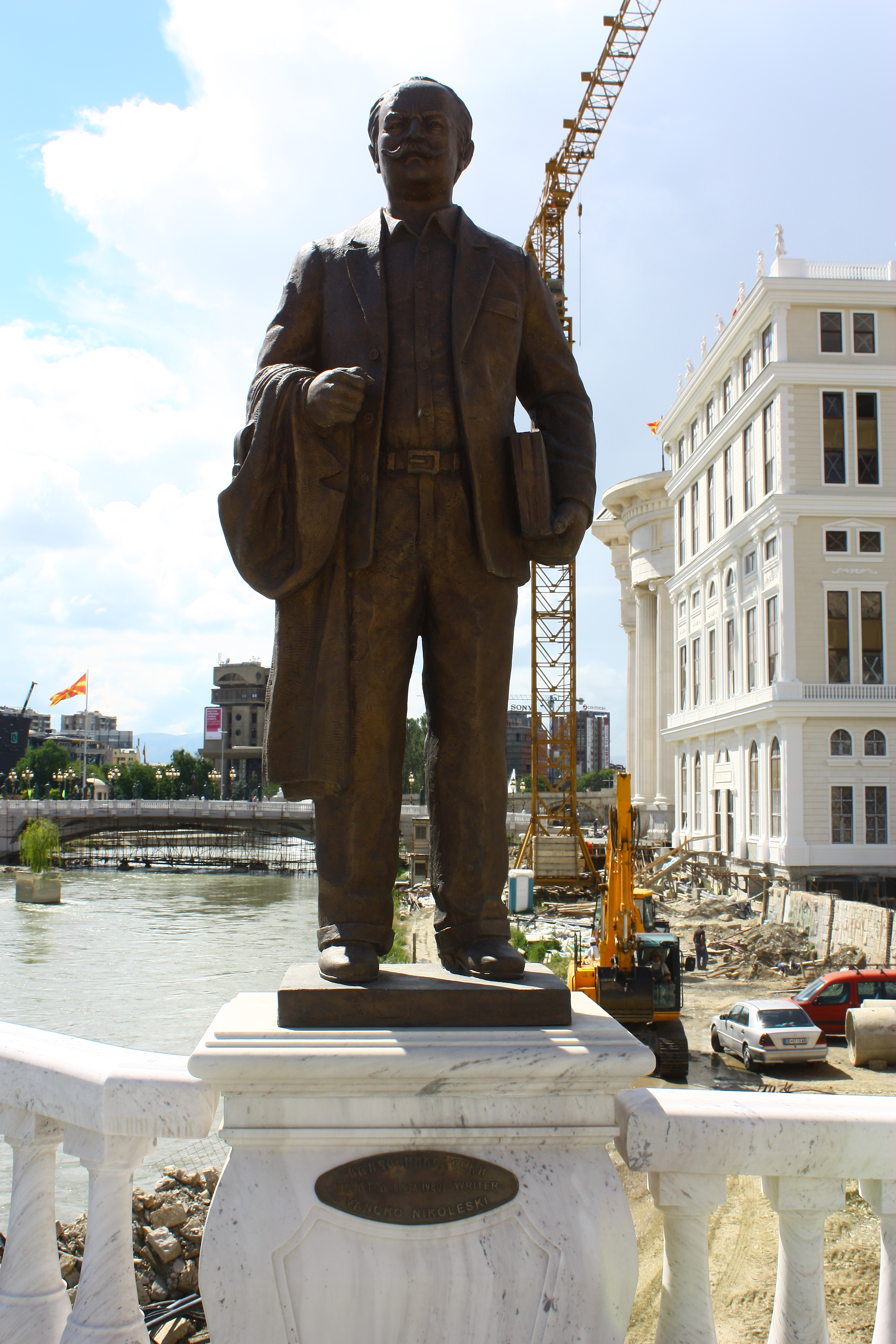
Vančo Nikoleski

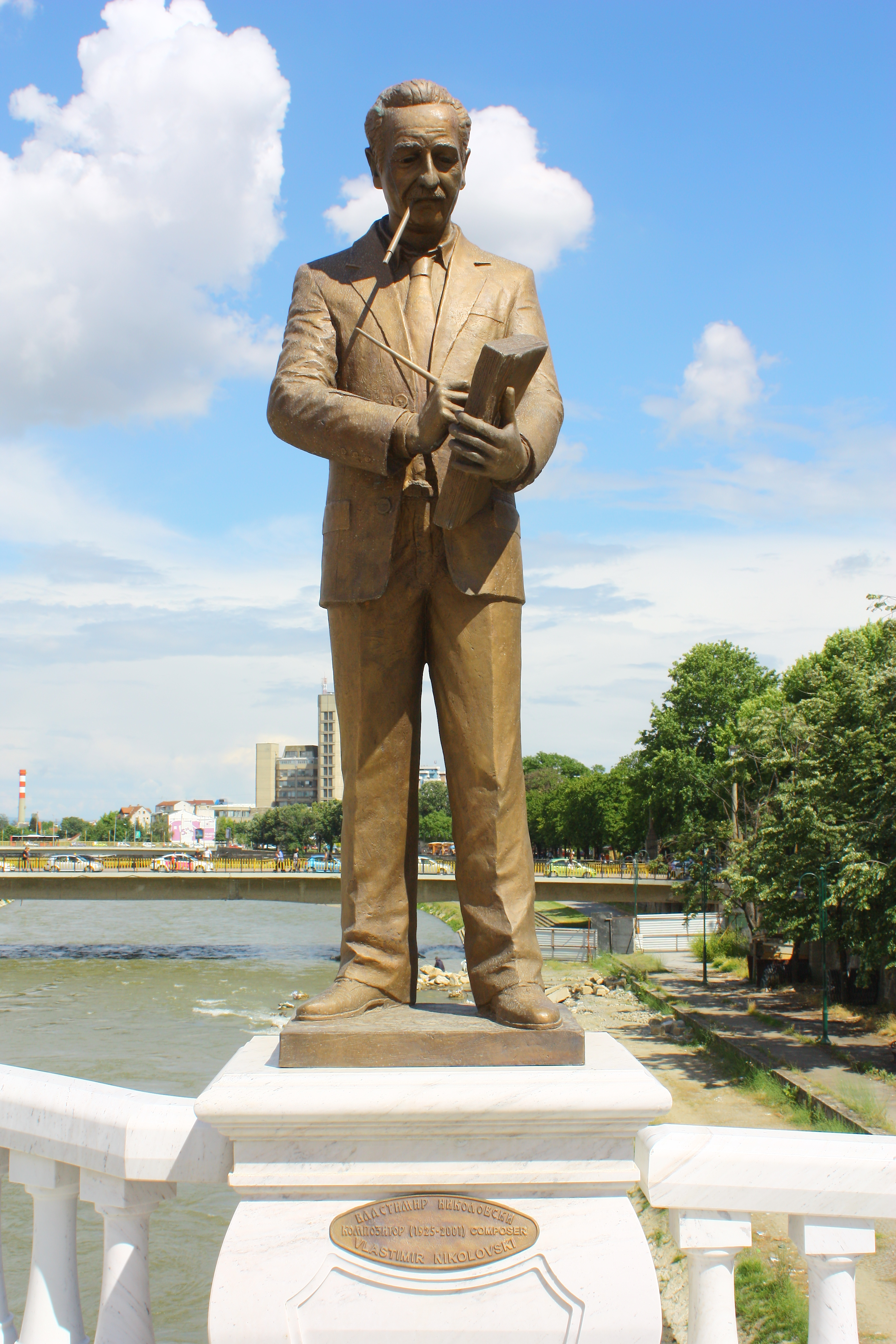
Vlastimir Nikolovski

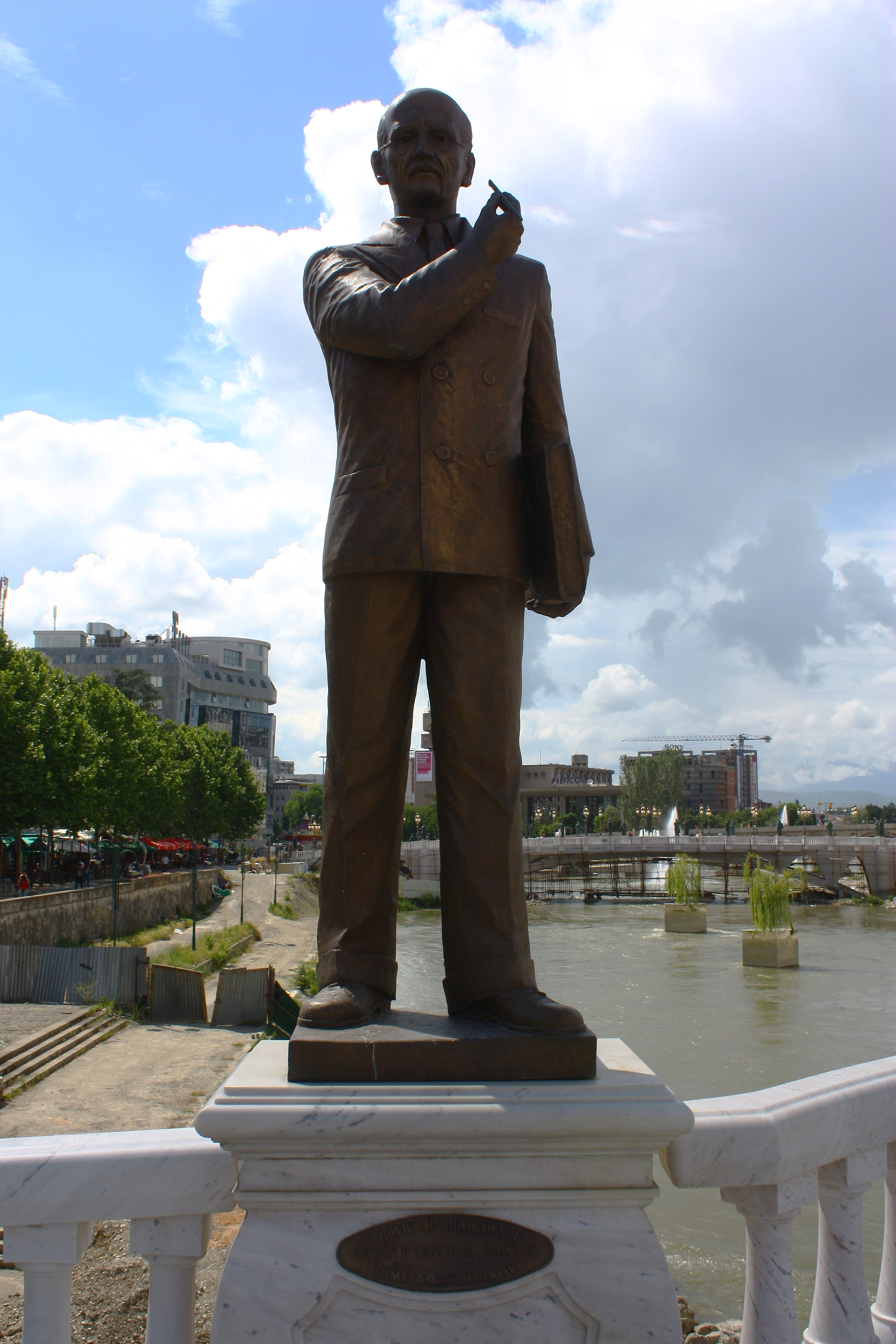
Dimitar Pandilov

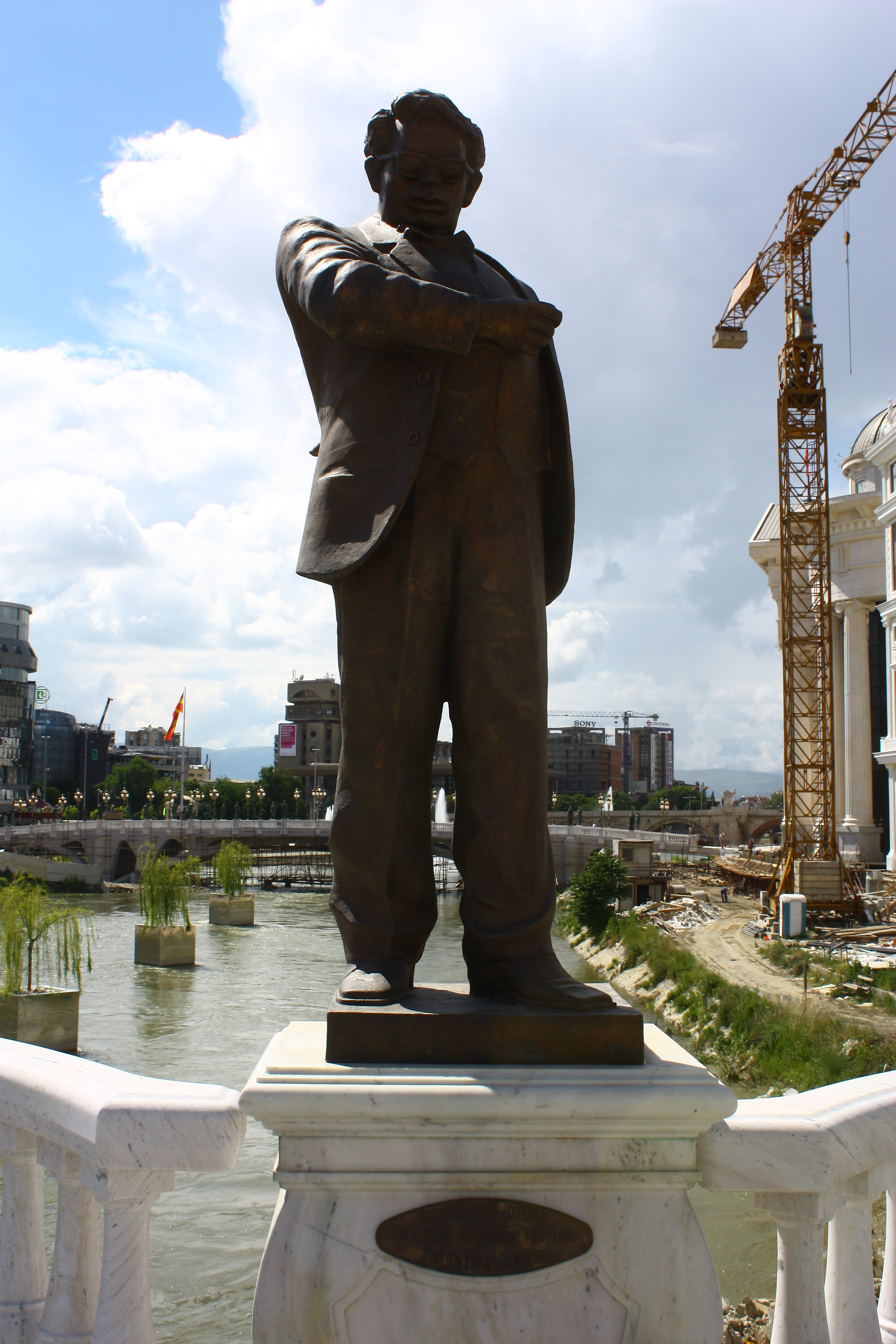
Murteza Peza

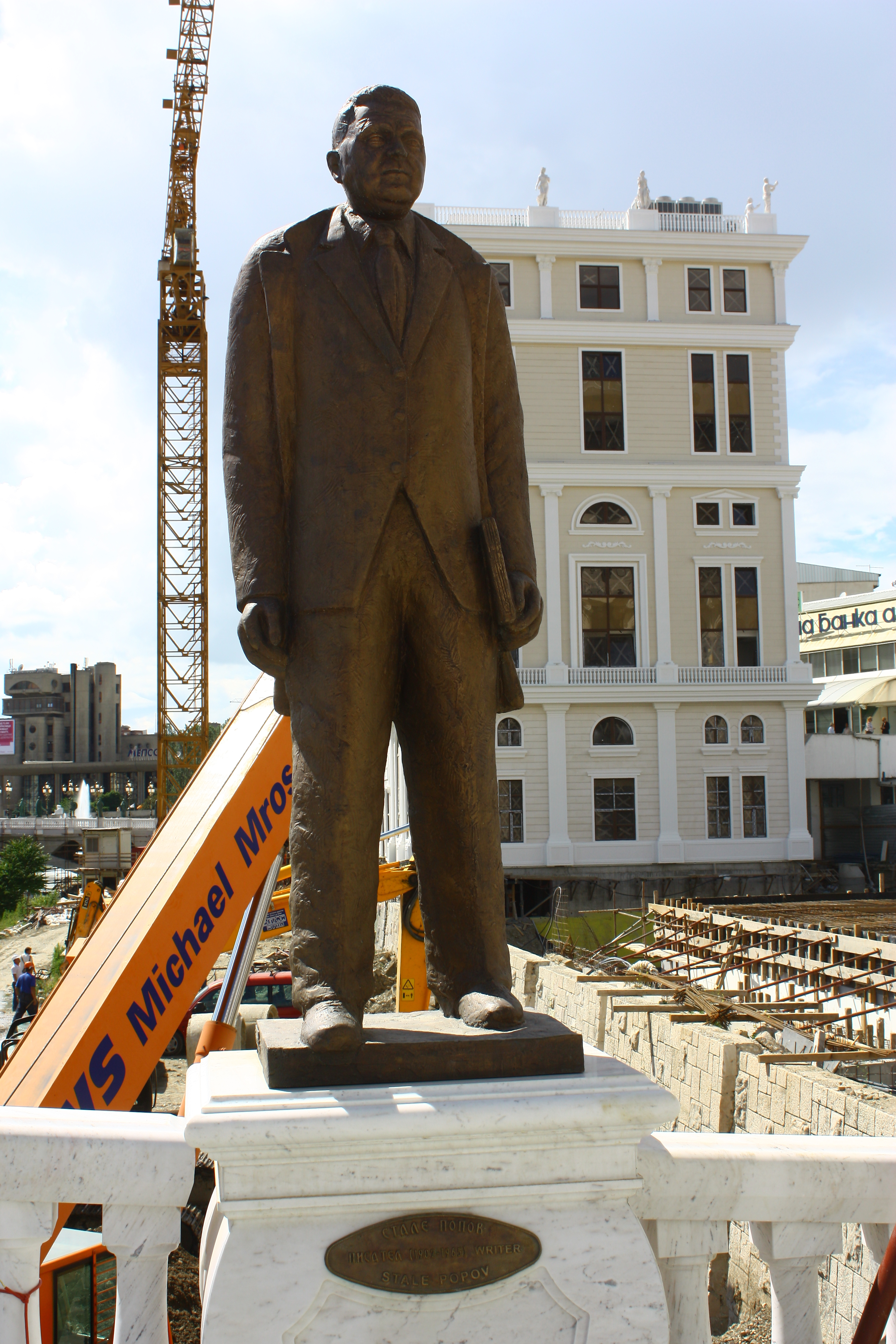
Stale Popov

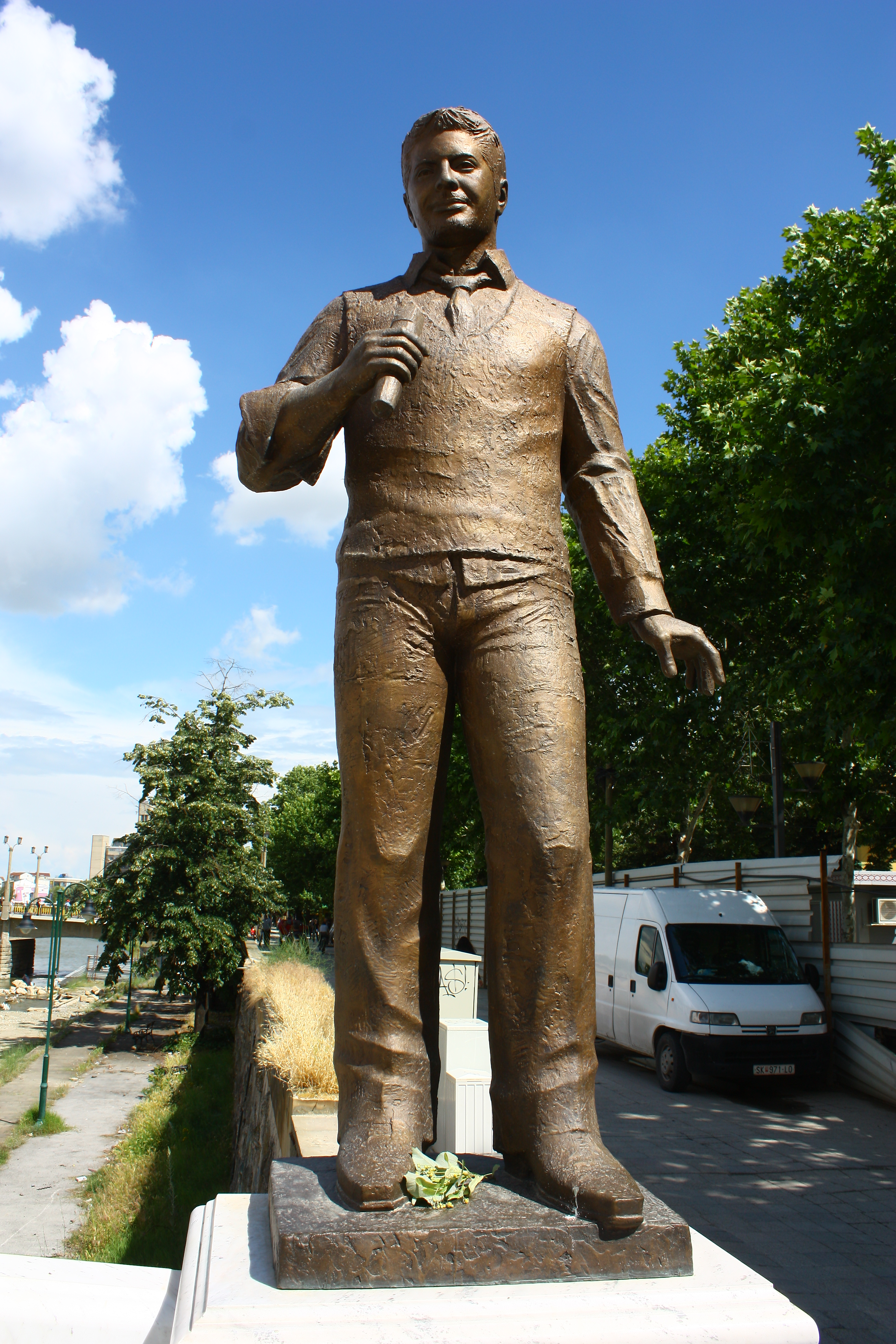
Toše Proeski

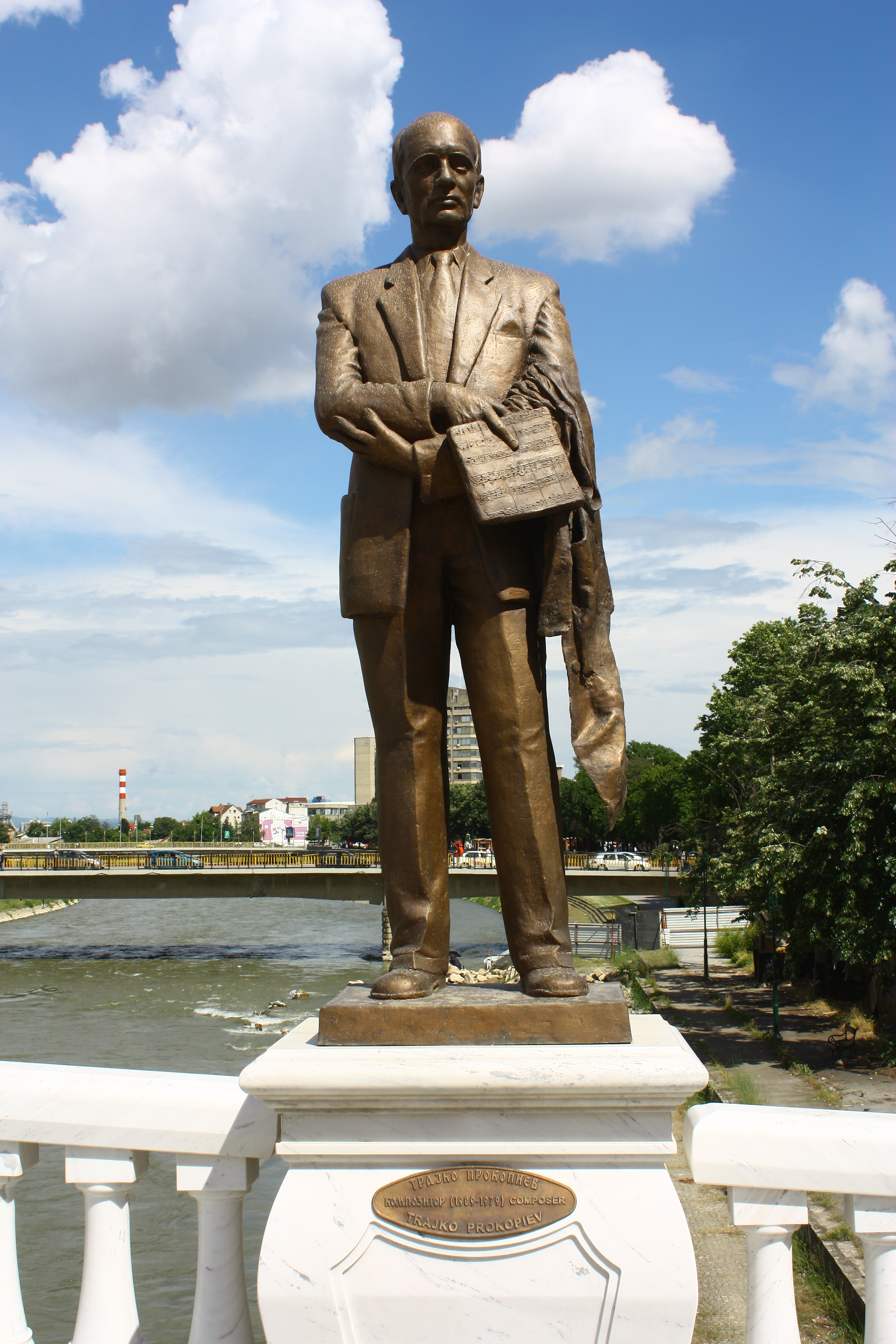
Trajko Prokopiev

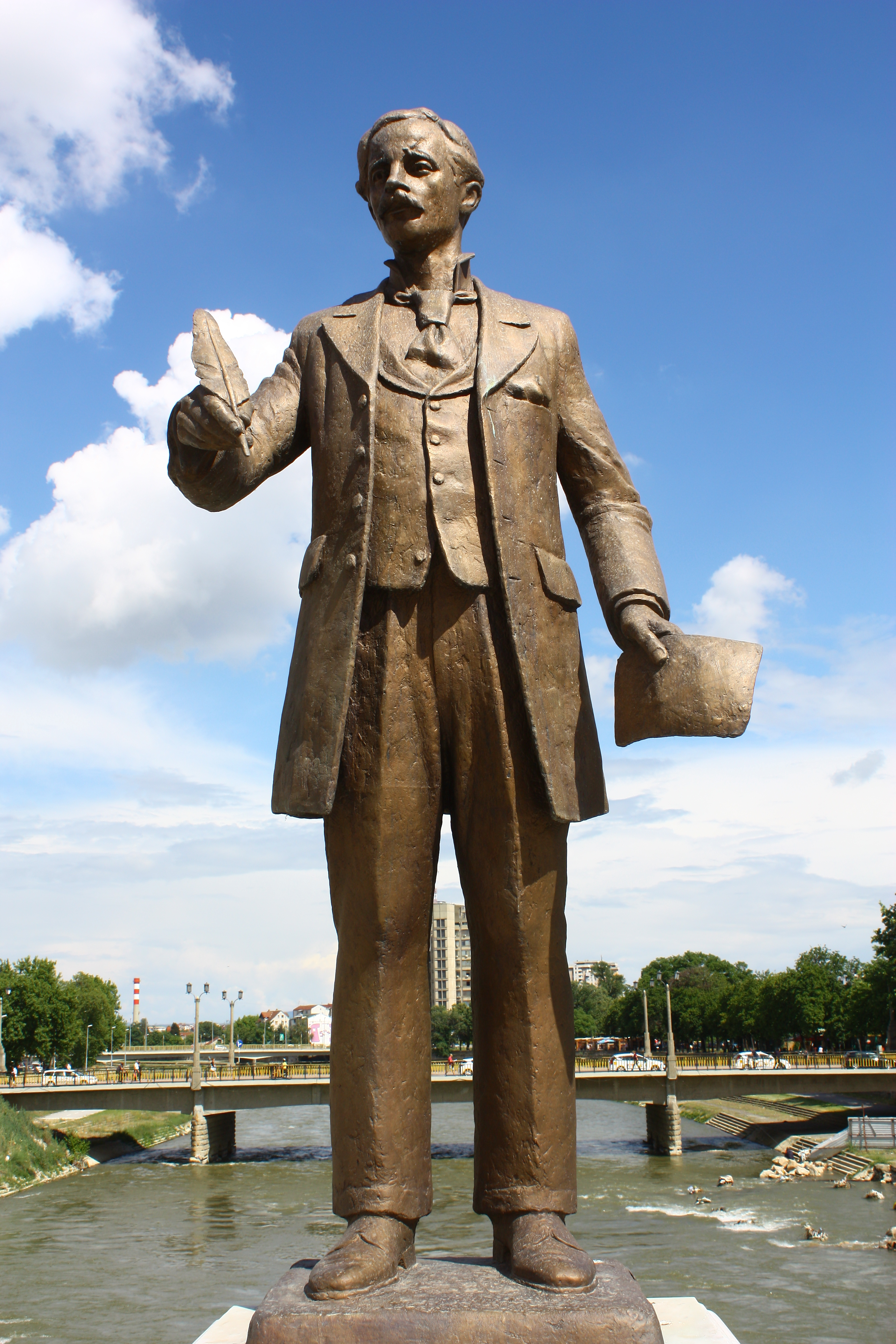
Grigor Prličev

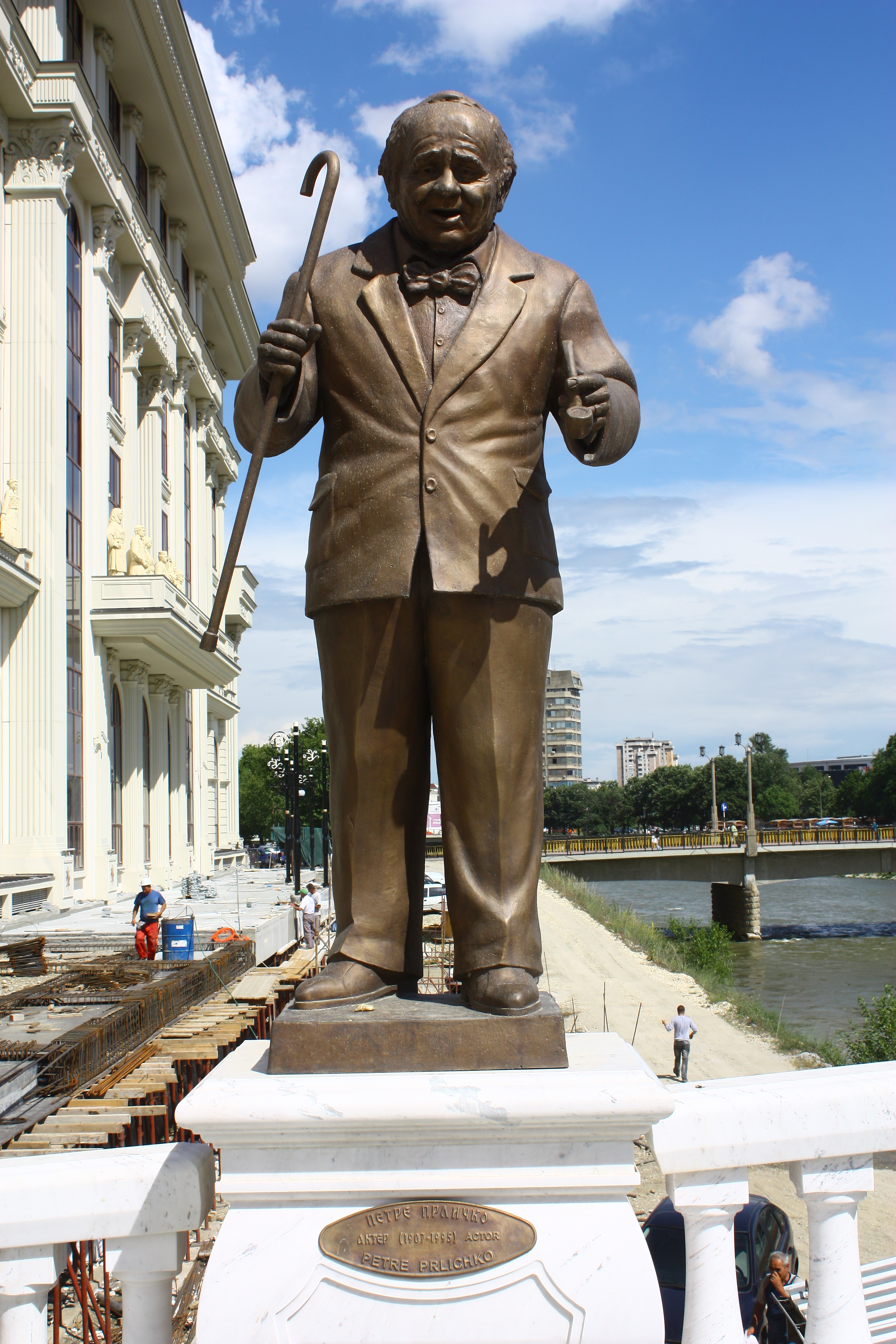
Petre Prličko

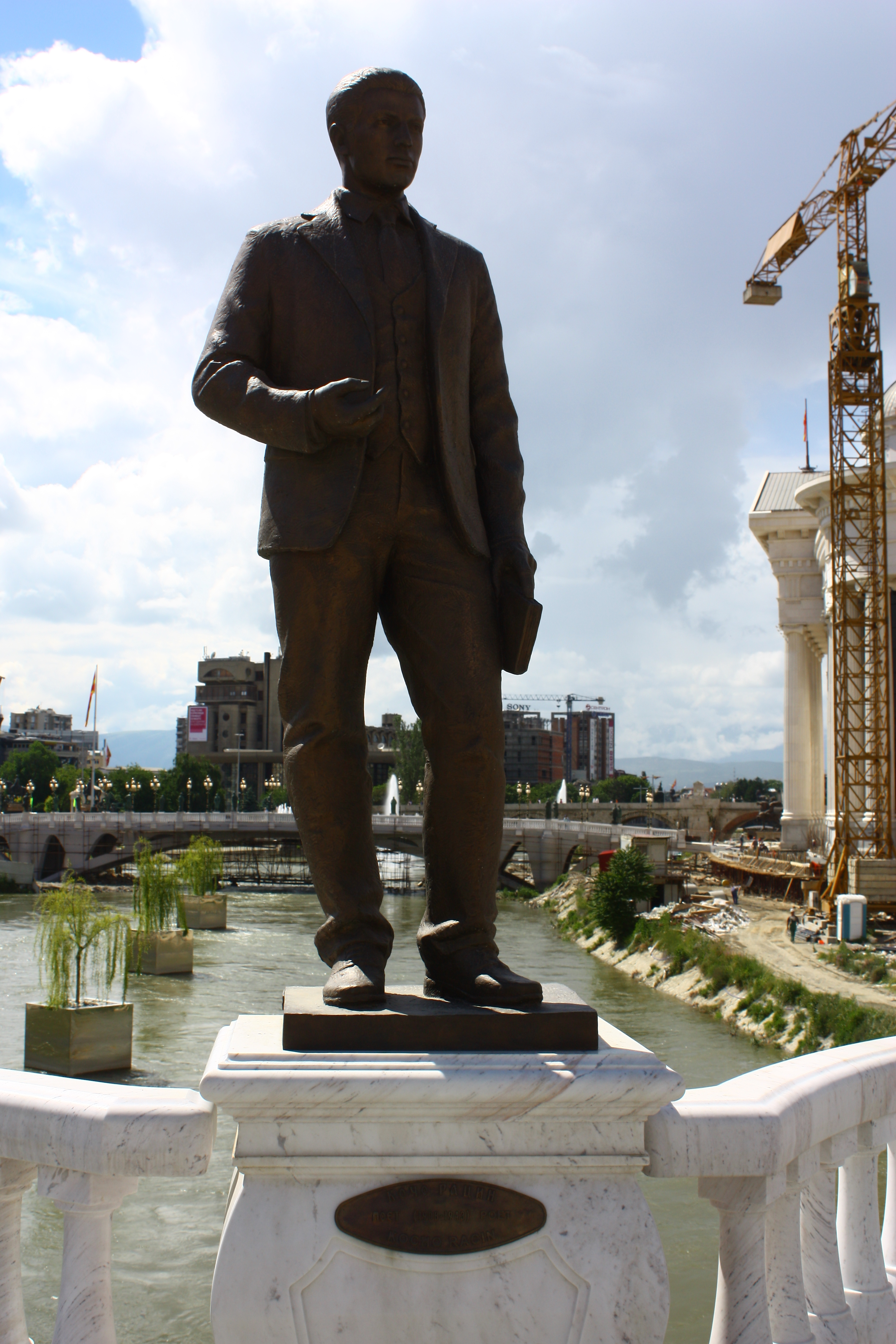
Kočo Racin

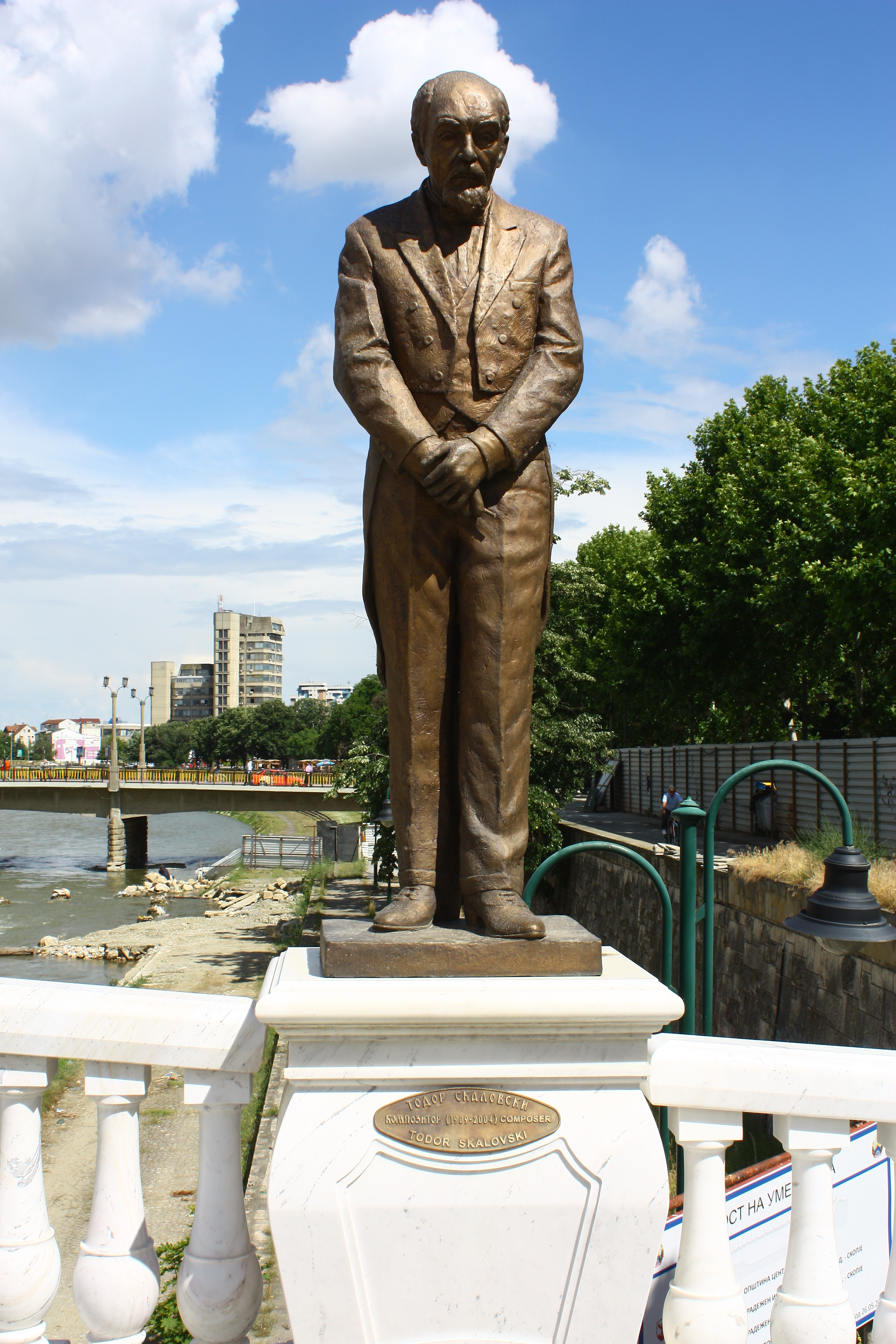
Todor Skalovski

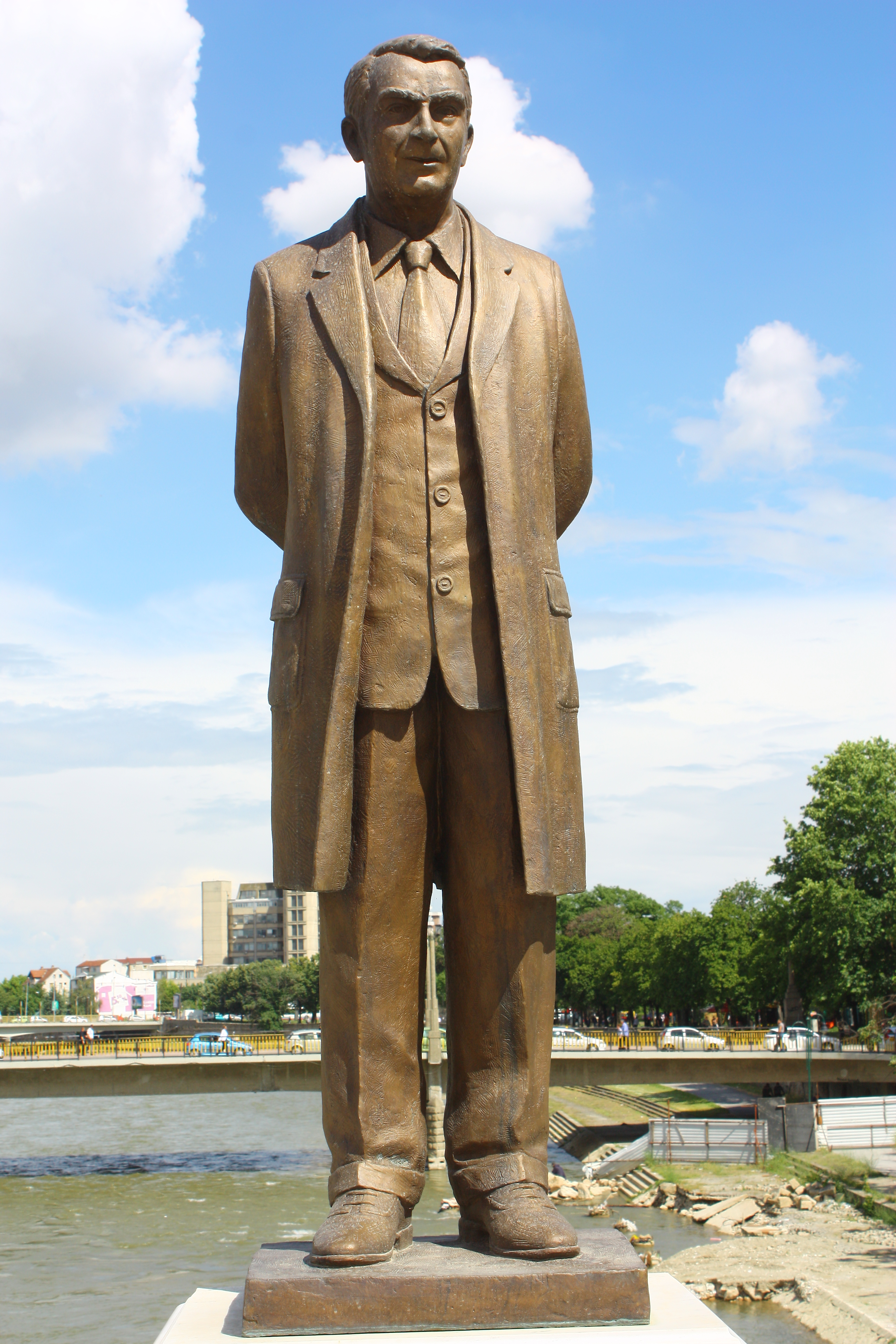
Aco Šopov

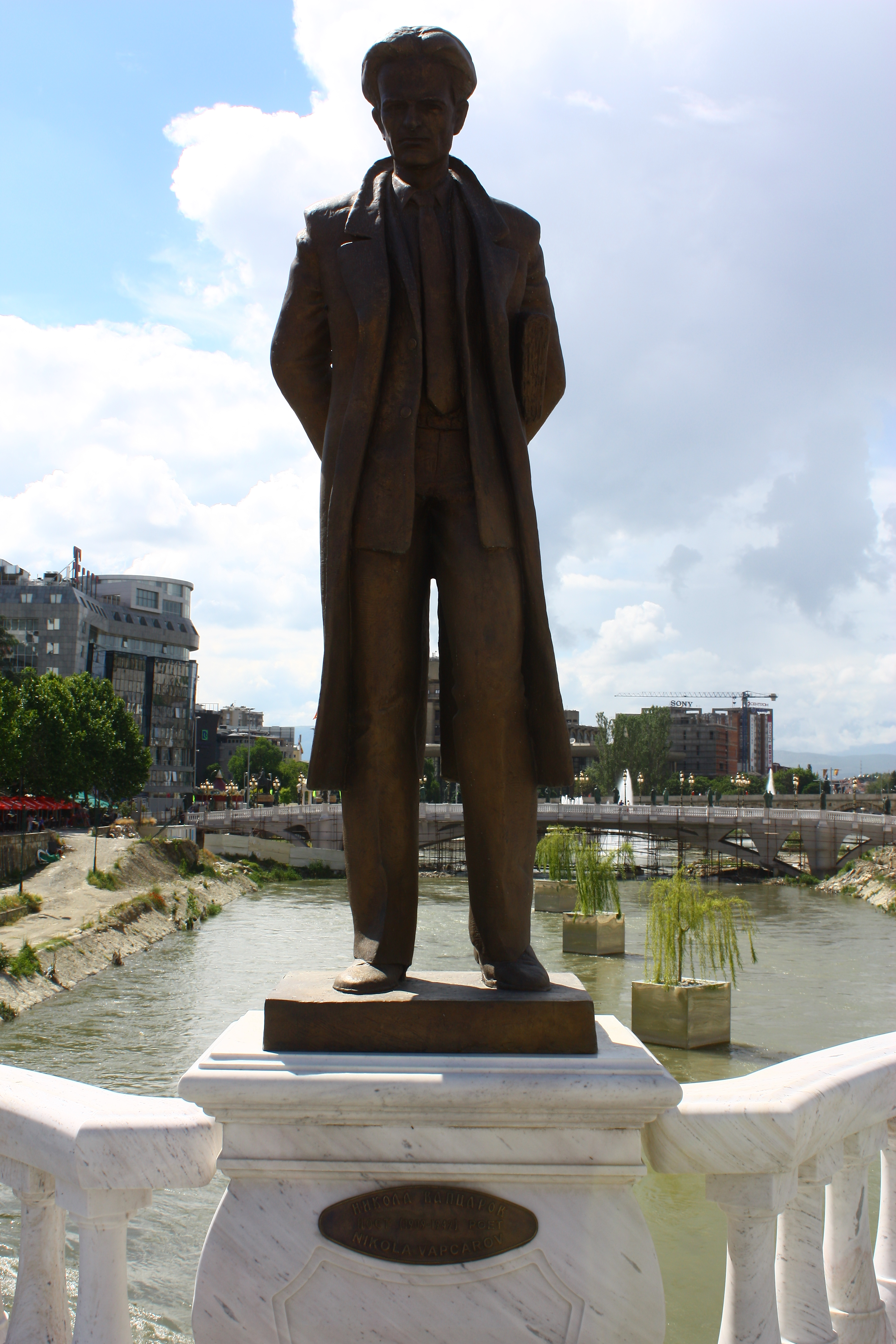
Nikola Vapcarov

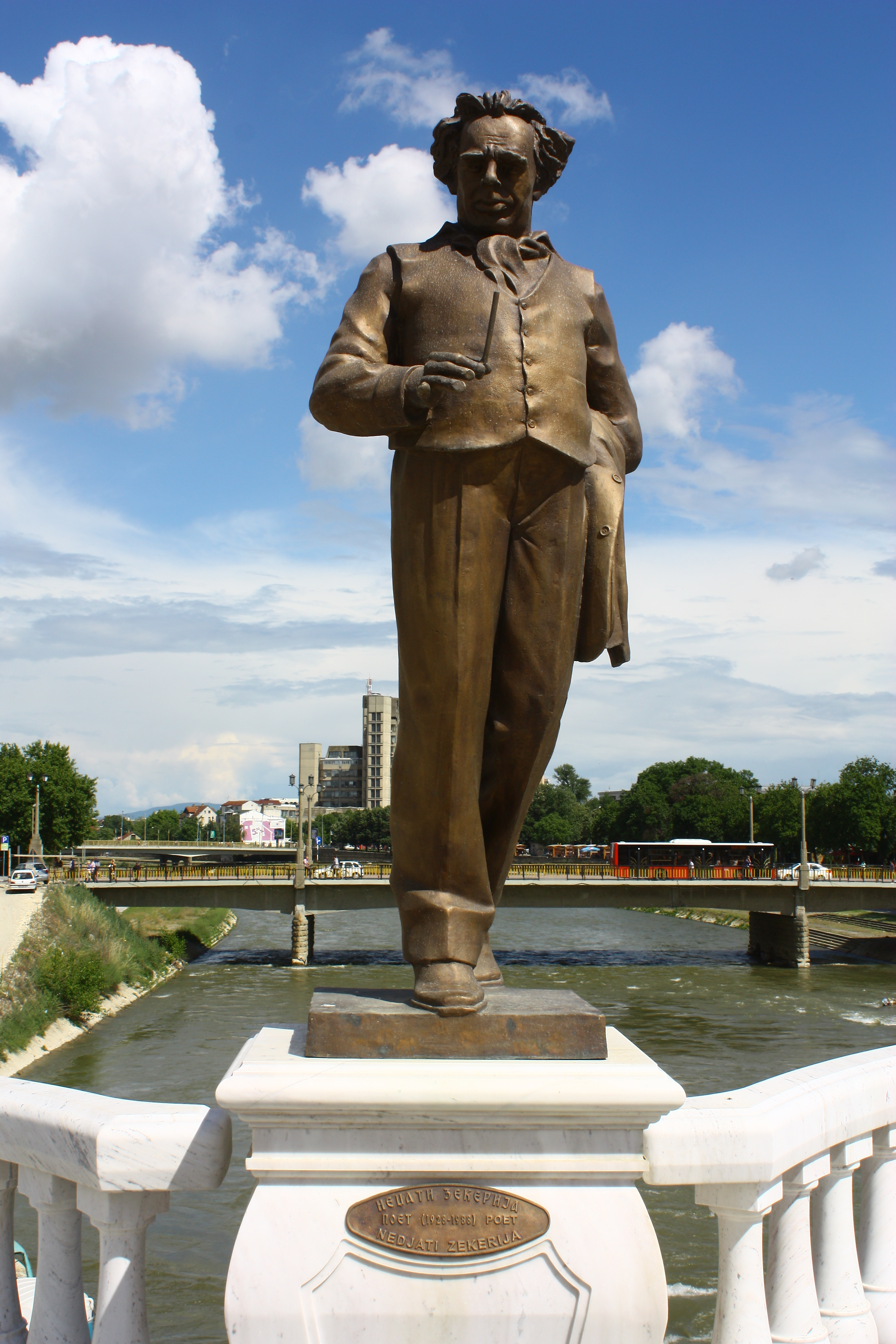
Nedžati Zekirija
