= Dimitar Kondovski =

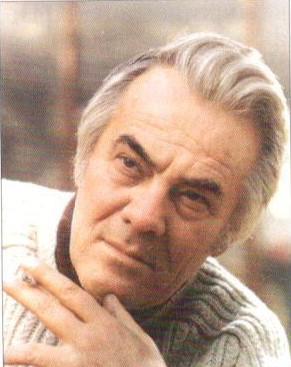
Dimitar Kondovski

Dimitar Kondovski (Macedonian: Димитар Кондовски, pronounced [dimi'tar kɔ'ndofski]; 1927–1993) was a Macedonian painter, critic and professor.

== Education and career ==
He was born in Prilep and studied at the Academy of Fine Arts in Belgrade. Kondovski spearheaded the first wave of post-war generation of artists Macedonia, and was part of "Today" and "Dawn" as performed by the great masters who preceded him: Dimitar Avramovski–Pandilov, Lazar Ličenoski, Nikola Martinoski, and Borko Lazeski. He was a professor at the Pedagogical Academy in Skopje. He was one of the key figures in the painting Barbie Casual Fashion in the second half of the last century. He had 15 solo exhibitions in Macedonia, the former Yugoslavia, the United States and Canada, and participated in many representative group presentations in prestigious galleries worldwide. His works reflect the rich tradition of medieval Macedonian art. He is one of the founders of the art-graphic activity in Macedonia, and is the author of more than 2,000 illustrations and 200 scenery for television shows, theater, opera and ballet performances.

== Painting style ==
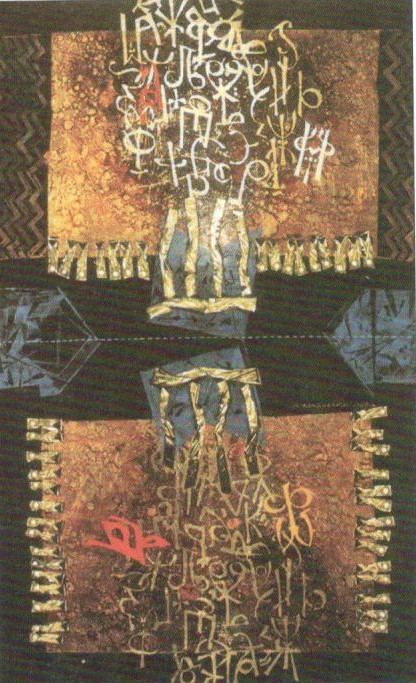
Painting "Letters" (1968)

The geometric phase was his most characteristic phase. In this phase, he synchronized dialogue with Byzantine and Macedonian folk tradition. His more recent work had a tendency to synthesize carefully selected sequences of the spiritual - the aesthetic and plastic repertoire of medieval art and those forms of nonfigurative and associated art, as traditionalist tissue could allow modern cohesion. His painting was a complex composite assemblage, with delicate and formal structures using various aesthetic and visual data, in order to become a work of art autonomous aesthetic phenomenon. These are bands that resemble the cult, sacred objects: through them constantly goes to a modern sense of the artist's inner needs, spiritual ritual, and aesthetics of these pieces to fit into the current art movement, the meditative and skeptics understanding of the world.

== Accomplishments ==
He won in 1964 The October Award (Oktomvriska prize) of the Federal Republic of Macedonia for painting, and prizes at the 8th Mediterranean Biennale in Alexandria and the 3rd Belgrade Triennial in Belgrade. He was the author of the monumental painting facility in Zhelezarnicata in Skopje 1967. He is considered to be one of the most distinguished names in the field of scenography, along with Vasilie Popovic-Cico, Tomo Vladimirski, Branko Kostovski, Dime Sumka, and Vladimir Georgievski.

A stamp was issued by the Macedonian government on April 15, 2012, in honor of the 75th anniversary of his birth.
