= Lazar Ličenoski =

Lazar Ličenoski, self-portrait, 1947

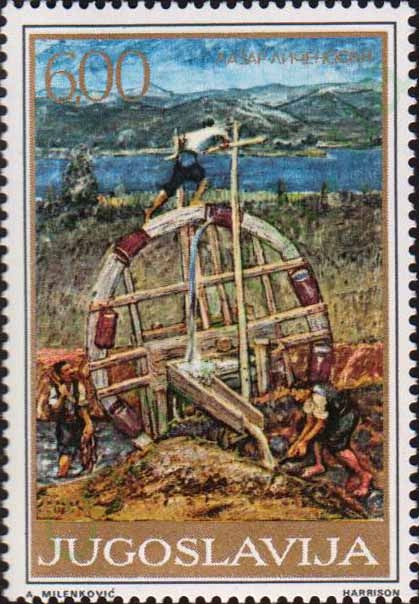
Water wheel by Ličenoski on a 1975 Yugoslav stamp

Lazar Ličenoski (Macedonian: Лазар Личеноски; 26 March 1901 in Galicnik – 10 April 1964 in Skopje) was one of the first Macedonian expressionist painters and one of the most authentic painters of landscape, in which he imported folk elements as well. He painted still nature, portraits and mosaics.

== Education and career ==
Ličenoski graduated in 1927 from an art school in Belgrade, where he had studied under Milan Milovanović (1876–1946), Ljubomir Ivanovic (1882–1945) and Petar Dobrovic (1890–1942). Upon graduation, he organized his first exhibition in Skopje and specialized in wall painting at the School of Applied Arts in Paris. There he attended the École nationale supérieure d'arts et métiers (1927–29) and frequented the studio of Andre Lhote. In 1929 he returned to Belgrade and became a member of the group Oblik. In the 1930s he gradually abandoned portraiture and social issues as subject-matter in favour of painting the Macedonian landscape, which he rendered with somewhat crude brushwork and thick layers of intense colour. During that decade he decorated ecclesiastical and other buildings and worked on the monument Albanian Golgotha (1940) for the Serbian soldiers' cemetery on the island of Vido (Greece). He moved to Skopje in 1945 and became a professor at the newly established School of Applied Arts. Licenoski exhibited at several one-man and group shows at home and abroad.

== Painting style ==
His style had developed in the context of the Ecole de Paris, which contrasted with the narrative models he had inherited from the Post-Byzantine tradition. In his mature work he introduced the idiom of Expressionism into modern Macedonian art. From 1928 up to 1941, his art featured full color expressionism with a high presence of Macedonian motives on his canvases. He was also able to express himself perfectly well through fresco paintings and mosaics.

== Accomplishments ==
He founded the Office of Cultural and Historic Monuments, an art gallery and an art school where he taught until his death. He was a member of the Association of the Painting Artists of Macedonia (DLUM) and its first President, serving for one term.
