= Dimitar Avramovski-Pandilov =

Yugoslavian painter (1898–1963)

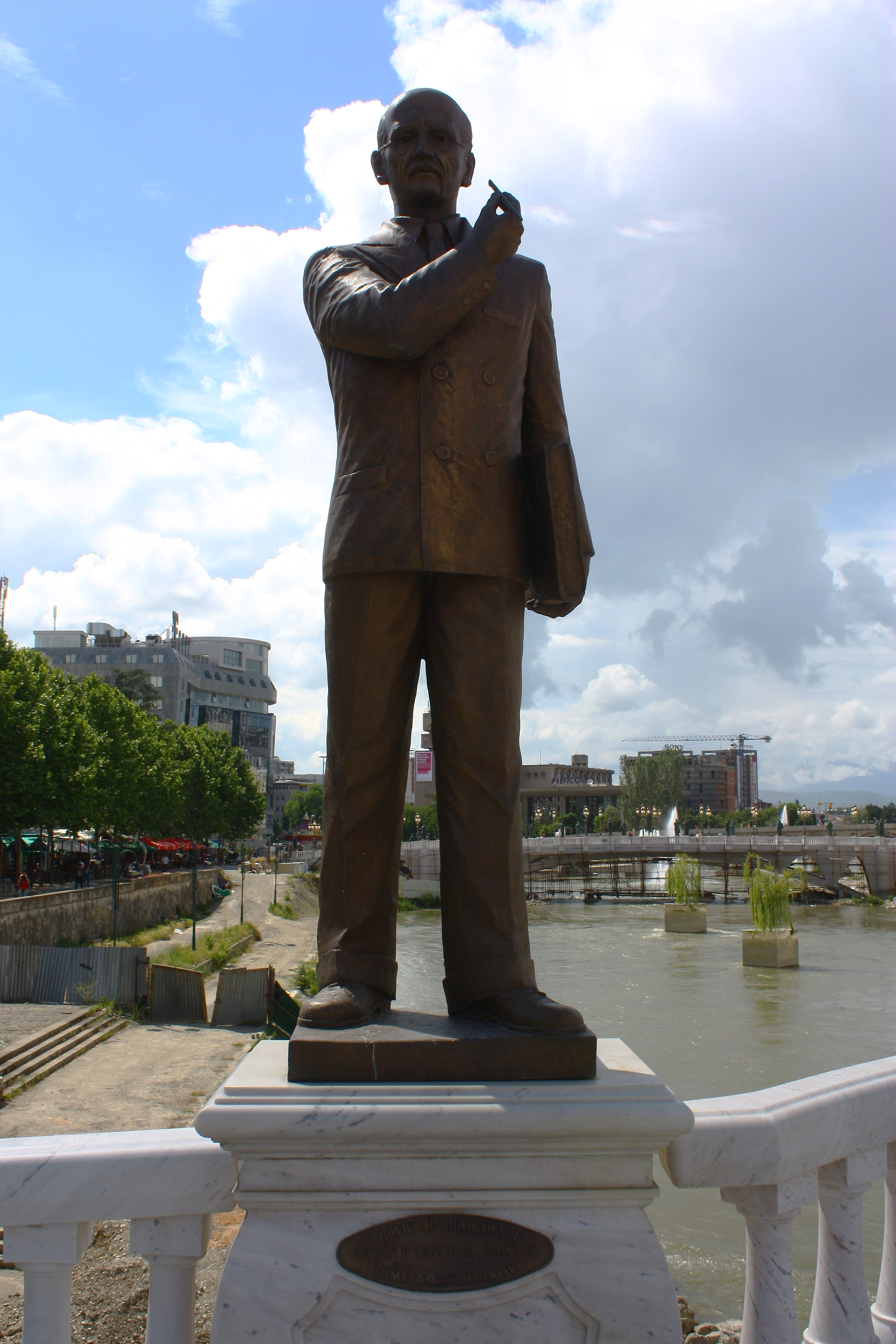
Monument of Dimitar Pandilov on the Art Bridge

Dimitar Avramovski–Pandilov (Macedonian: Димитар Аврамовски-Пандилов; Bulgarian: Димитър Пандилов Аврамов; 1 March 1898 – 26 July 1963) was a Bulgarian and Macedonian painter. Pandilov is considered the founder of modern Macedonian art.

== Education and career ==
He was born in Tresonče, in the Manastir Vilayet of the Ottoman Empire as Dimitar Pandilov Avramov in the family of the IMRO revolutionary Pandil Avramov. He finished his studies in the National Academy of Art Sofia, Bulgaria in 1924. Afterwards he worked in Sofia. In the period 1927 - 1928 he specialized in Paris. From 1928 to 1943 he lived in the village of Hayredin in Bulgaria, working as an art teacher. After the annexation of Yugoslav Macedonia from Bulgaria during WWII, he returned to his homeland. Pandilov collaborated with the Bulgarian authorities and was a mayor of the village of Smilevo and then of Kukurečani. At that time, his father Pandil Avramov received a Bulgarian national pension as a meritorious fighter for the liberation of Macedonia.

After the War he became a teacher at the Skopje high school "Josip Broz Tito". He was one of the founders of the Association of the painters of Socialist Republic of Macedonia. He died at the Skopje earthquake in 1963.

== Painting style ==
The style of his soft, warm and lyrical palette fluctuates between poetic realism and neo-impressionism. His paintings include scenes from traditional life, landscapes, urban panoramas, still lifes, portraits and nudes. He was the first Macedonian painter with an academic degree who departed from the fresco-painting tradition.

== Accomplishments ==
He is regarded the first Macedonian impressionists in modern North Macedonia. As an artist and pedagogue he made a considerable contribution in the formation of many generations of young artists. He is considered also a Bulgarian painter in Bulgaria.
