= List of Macedonian artists =

The following is a chronological list of Macedonian artists working in visual media. Sources of names, birth and death dates, and occupation are contained within individual pages.

== 19th century ==
- Gavril Atanasov (1863-1945) painter
- Dimitar Avramovski–Pandilov (1898-1963) painter

== 20th century ==
- Lazar Licenoski (1901-1964) painter
- Nikola Martinoski (1903-1973) painter
- Tomo Vladimirski (1904-1971) painter
- Vangel Kodžoman (1904-1994) painter
- Abdurrahim Buza (1905-1987) painter
- Dimo Todorovski (1910-1983) artist, sculptor
- Ljubomir Belogaski (1911-1994) painter
- Keraca Visulčeva (1911-2004) painter, sculptor
- Borislav Traikovski (1917-1996) painter
- Janko Konstantinov (1926-2010) architect, painter
- Dimitar Kondovski (1927-1993) painter, critic and professor
- Petar Mazev (1927-1993) painter
- Dušan Džamonja (1928-2009) sculptor
- Petar Hadzi Boskov (1928-2015) sculptor
- Ordan Petlevski (1930-1997) painter, drawing, graphic arts and illustration
- Petar Gligorovski (1938–1995) painter, animated movie director
- Kole Manev (1941-) painter
- Angel Gavrovski (1942-) painter
- Kiril Cenevski (1943-2019) film director
- Kiro Urdin (1945-) visual, multimedia artist and film director
- Apostol Trpeski (1948-) cinematographer
- Rubens Korubin (1949-) painter
- Stole Popov (1950-) film director
- Mice Jankulovski (1954-) painter, cartoonist
- Miroslav Grčev (1955-) architect, graphic designer, and caricaturist
- Gligor Stefanov (1956-) sculptor and environmental installations artist
- Zarko Baseski (1957-) sculptor
- Vlado Goreski – Rafik (1958-) Sceneography, graphic art, theatre poster design
- Milcho Manchevski (1959-) writer, director, photographer and artist
- Nikola Eftimov (1968-) fashion designer, visual artist
- Goran Trenchovski (1970-) director, writer
- Darko Mitrevski (1971-) film director
- Bobby Stojanov Varga (1972-) painter
- Svetozar Ristovski (1972-) film director
- Igor Ivanov Izi (1973-) film director
- Maja Hill (1976-) painter, character animation, mosaics, sculpture, contemporary art
- Glisha Kostovski woodcarver
- Nadja Petrovic (1991-), painter

== See also ==
- Macedonian culture (Slavic)
- Macedonian art (Byzantine)
- Macedonian people
