= Us, Ours and Yours (TV series) =

- Ние, нашите и вашите
- Genre: Comedy
- Directed by: Dimitar Gochev
- Starring: Elena Petrova; Kiril Efremov; Radina Borshosh; Daria Hadjiiska; Martin Jelankov; Martin Tsolov; Simeon Angelov; Stefka Yanorova; Daniel Angelov
- Country of origin: Bulgaria
- Original language: Bulgarian
- No. of seasons: 1
- No. of episodes: 24

Production
- Running time: 45 minutes

Original release
- Network: Nova Television
- Release: March 8 – May 25, 2017

"Us, Ours and Yours" (Bulgarian: Ние, нашите и вашите) is a Bulgarian comedy series. It is largely inspired by the American "Step by Step" series, which was broadcast in Bulgaria in 1994, 2006 (Nova TV), 2009 and 2016.

== Episodes ==
Season	Timeslot	TV Season	Episodes	Premiere	Final
1	Wednesday and Thursday, 9:00 PM	2017 (Spring)	24	March 8, 2017	May 25, 2017

== Series overview ==
Two lovers middle-aged, five children and mother in law under one roof - this is a newly created family Ivanov. Lili is the first love of Christo and Hristo - her first love. Between the first kiss and their wedding has been more than 20 years during which they have a marriage behind him and five children - two daughters and three sons Lili for Hristo. There is also another challenge in front of them - the heroine Lili is back not only to his first love, but in his native Bulgaria because of her previous husband has lived in Greece and England. Is it possible to love and more importantly - is it possible marriage once bitten? Excessive burden they have five different age and temperament children? What clash of generations born and sufficient Is love to smooth misunderstandings, especially when besides the age difference is in social status, interests and perceptions of life heroes? And what is to come back to their homeland, seeking its place and true love?

== Cast and characters ==
- Elena Petrova - Lilly
- Kiril Efremov - Hristo
- Radina Borshosh - Despina "Dessi"
- Daria Hadjiiska - Elena-Kristina "Eka"
- Martin Jelankov - Martin
- Martin Tsolov - Ivaylo "Ivo"
- Simeon Angelov - Vili
- Stefka Yanorova - Svetla
- Daniel Angelov - Bojinov
- Velichka Geogrieva - Margarita "Margo" Zografska
- Krasimir Rankov - Obzor "Zorko"
- Stefan Popov - Kristian
- Tsvetelin Pavlov - Krumov
- Anton Poryazov - Rosen "Roskata"

== Guest appearances ==
- Dicho Hristov
- Dara
- Nadezhda Petrova

== Broadcast ==
The premiere of the series is on March 8, 2017 and is broadcast every Wednesday at 9:00 pm. on Nova TV.
