= Jankulovski =

Jankulovski (Macedonian: Јанкуловски) is a North Macedonian surname. Notable people with the surname include:

- Dime Jankulovski (born 1977), Swedish footballer of Macedonian descent
- Marek Jankulovski (born 1977), Czech footballer of Macedonian descent
- Mice Jankulovski (born 1954), Macedonian painter, cartoonist, animator and public figure
