= Attraction (2018 film) =

- Привличане
- Directed by: Martin Makariev
- Screenplay by: Yana Marinova; Borislav Zahariev; Georgi Angelov; Alexander Chobanov
- Produced by: Yana Marinova; Bashar Rahal
- Starring: Yana Marinova; Alexander Sano; Luiza Grigorova; Radina Borshosh; Koyna Ruseva; Vlado Penev; Bashar Rahal; Zhivko Simeonov; Mihail Nedyalkov
- Cinematography: Ivan Vatsov
- Music by: Neddy John Cross; Vasil Ivanov – Dexter
- Production company: Spirit Production House
- Distributed by: Lenta
- Release date: February 23, 2018
- Running time: 118 minutes
- Country: Bulgaria
- Language: Bulgarian
- Budget: 872 639 leva

Attraction (Привличане) is a 2018 Bulgarian romantic comedy film directed by Martin Makariev, and starring Yana Marinova, Alexander Sano, Luiza Grigorova, Radina Borshosh, Koyna Ruseva, Vlado Penev, Bashar Rahal, Zhivko Simeonov and Mihail Nedyalkov. The screenplay was written by Marinova, Borislav Zahariev, Georgi Angelov and Alexander Chobanov, while Marinova is the co-producer of the film with Rahal.

Attraction is filmed in October 2017 and was released theatrically in February 23, 2018.

== Cast ==
- Yana Marinova as Lora Angelova
- Alexander Sano as Kalin Sokolov
- Luiza Grigorova-Makariev as Diana Borisova
- Koyna Ruseva as Irena Velikova
- Bashar Rahal as Velikov
- Radina Borshosh as Sonya
- Zhivko Simeonov as Vasil
- Mihail Nedyalkov as 'The Trombone'
- Chloe Rahal as Mimi
- Spartak Todorov as Bobo
- Vasil Iliev as Kiro
- Anastassia Levordashka as Nina
- Vladimir Tsvetanov as Zhelev
- Nadya Keranova as Nikol
- Vladimir Penev as Stoev, the principal
- Zhivko Sirakov as Sasho
- Karla Rahal as Radinova
- Nikoleta Lozanova as the mother of 'The Trombone'
- Vasko Ivanov - Dexter as the DJ
- Marko Marinovich as the rapper
- Kaloyan Paterkov as Bogdanov
- Harry Rangelov as the waiter
