= Miroslav Borshosh =

Bulgarian politician (born 1972)

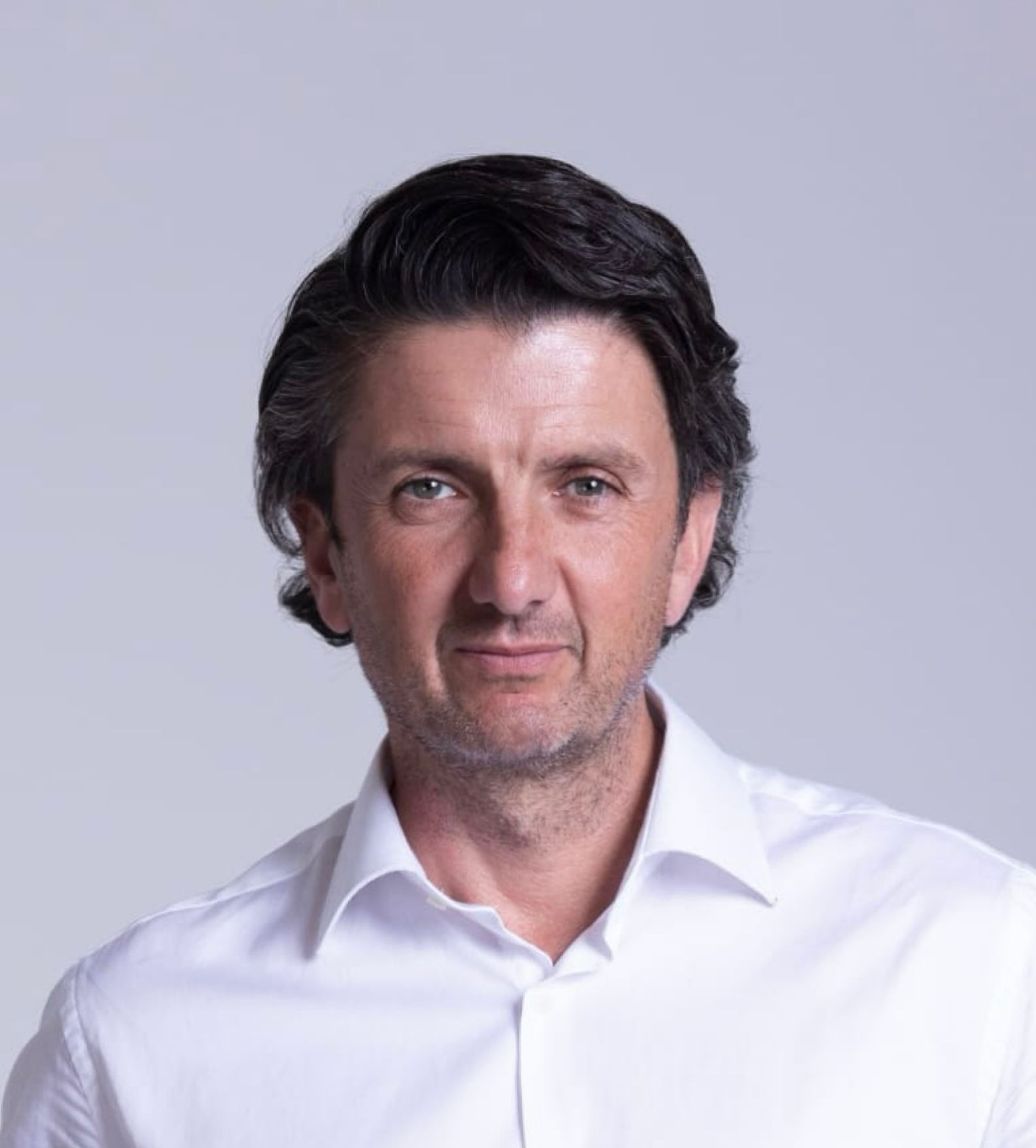

Minister of Tourism
- In office 16 January 2025 – 19 February 2026
- Prime Minister: Rosen Zhelyazkov
- Preceded by: Evtim Miloshev
- Succeeded by: Irena Georgieva (acting)

Personal details
- Born: 8 December 1972 (age 53)
- Party: GERB
- Children: Radina Borshosh

Miroslav Laslo Borshosh (Bulgarian: Мирослав Ласло Боршош, Hungarian: Miroszlav László Borsos); born 8 December 1972) is a Bulgarian politician who served as minister of tourism between 2025 and 2026. From 2014 to 2017, he served as director of the National Palace of Culture.

Borshosh is of Hungarian descent on his father's side and grew up in Budapest.
