= Kiril Efremov =

Macedonian painter (1938–2020)

- Кирил Ефремов
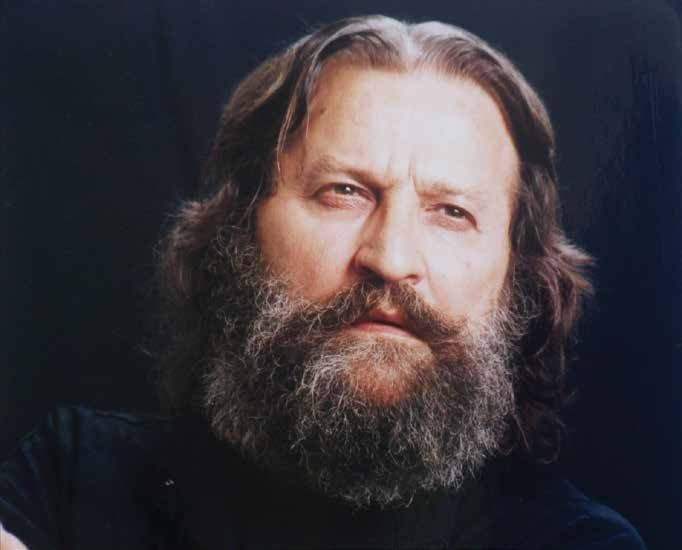
- Efremov
- Born: 19 December 1938; Štip, Kingdom of Yugoslavia
- Died: 30 September 2020 (aged 81); Štip, North Macedonia
- Education: School of Applied Arts in Skopje, under Lazar Ličenoski; Academy of Fine Arts, Belgrade
- Known for: Painting, drawing, printmaking and stage design
- Notable work: Mannequins, Mediocres and Sacred Remains; Bloody Macedonian Epiphany; Megalopolis; The Last Supper
- Style: Figurative, surrealist and fantastic art
- Movement: Surrealism
- Awards: Eighth of November Award; Lazar Ličenoski Award; Kliment Ohridski Award

Kiril Efremov (Macedonian: Кирил Ефремов; 19 December 1938 in Štip – 30 September 2020 in Štip) was a Macedonian painter, draughtsman, printmaker, stage designer, poet and art essayist. He is regarded as one of the most significant representatives of surrealist tendencies in modern Macedonian painting. Art historian Boris Petkovski described his expression as a "special symbolic variant of surrealism", while the poet and critic Vlada Urošević placed him among the most prominent Macedonian painters to adopt surrealist principles in a relatively pure form.

Efremov was a member of the Association of Fine Artists of Macedonia (Macedonian: Друштво на ликовните уметници на Македонија, ДЛУМ) from 1966 and served as its president from 1995 to 1997. During his career he mounted more than 50 solo exhibitions and participated in about 100 group exhibitions in Yugoslavia, North Macedonia and abroad. His work was the subject of retrospective exhibitions in Skopje in 2003 and 2025.

== Early life and education ==
Efremov was born on 19 December 1938 in Štip to Todor and Stojka Efremovi. He studied painting at the School of Applied Arts in Skopje in the class of Lazar Ličenoski, and subsequently completed the first degree of study at the Academy of Fine Arts in Belgrade.

After his studies, he became a member of the Yugoslav Association of Fine Artists and later joined DLUM. The biographical note in the 2025 retrospective catalogue records his DLUM membership from 1966 and his presidency from 1995 to 1997. He also undertook study visits to France, Italy and Switzerland.

Much of Efremov's professional and cultural activity was connected with his native Štip. He worked at the Aco Šopov Cultural Centre, where for many years he headed its Drawing Studio and helped assemble a collection of drawings. He also created stage designs for productions by the centre's drama section, directed by Simeon Gavrilov.

Efremov collaborated with the cultural journal SUM, edited by the writer Trajče Kacarov. He also published art essays, reviews and exhibition-catalogue texts in the journals Razgledi, Sovremenost and Delo.

He died on 30 September 2020 at the Clinical Hospital in Štip from complications of COVID-19.

== Artistic work ==
=== Beginnings and formation ===
Efremov's interest in the fantastic and the surreal emerged while he was still at secondary school in the late 1950s, when he produced the geometrised-figure drawings titled Psychosphere. His early output included drawings, sketches and prints made in an academic manner, but with an increasing transformation of form and the gradual introduction of surreal features. Works from this period include Self-Portrait (1958), Fisherman's Tale (1961), Omorina (1969) and What Does Monsieur Eiffel Remind You Of? (1974).

Efremov belonged to a generation of Macedonian artists who emerged in the early 1960s, during a period of increasing engagement with contemporary European and Yugoslav art movements. Although Informalism and abstraction were prominent in Macedonian painting at the time, he remained committed to representational and figurative painting. His formation drew on classical, Renaissance and Baroque art, as well as the Belgrade surrealist circle and the group Mediala. The latter's concepts of the "integral image", the combination of fantastic, mythological and symbolic elements, and the relationship between modern art and tradition were particularly relevant to his development.

=== Surrealist and fantastic expression ===
In the early 1960s, Efremov's paintings were characterised by a romantic atmosphere, fantasy and dream imagery, often rendered with smooth, resonant painted surfaces. During 1965 and 1966 his compositions became denser, his palette more subdued, and the literary basis of the pictures increasingly gave way to the exploration of formal pictorial values and the relationship between figuration and abstract association.

His solo exhibition at the Art Gallery in Skopje in 1972 is regarded as an important stage in the formation of his artistic outlook. It included compositions in which objects, landscapes, and human or anthropomorphic forms were placed in illogical and symbolic relationships. Works exhibited or associated with this period included Conquest of Time and Space, Melancholic Exterior, Return of the Prodigal Son, Bloody Macedonian Epiphany and Mannequins, Mediocres and Sacred Remains. The catalogue text was written by the author Slavko Janevski, who described Efremov as "clear in drawing and unequivocal in colour" and called the narrative of his pictures a "collage of unrest".

During the 1970s, Efremov also engaged with aspects of the work of Salvador Dalí, as well as pop art, new figuration and photorealism. He incorporated these elements into compositions connected with the local environment, Macedonian history and tradition, and his own personal mythology. At the same time, he continued to produce drawings and prints, including drypoints and linocuts. The 1975 prints Eclipse, Stija, Hello, The Sisyphism of a Pylon and Staring into Emptiness are among the works in which his surrealist iconography is most directly expressed.

=== Themes and motifs ===
Recurring motifs in Efremov's work include the portrait and self-portrait, the female and male nude, lovers, the sleeping figure, dogs, pomegranates, an empty gate, a picture frame and objects from everyday life. The self-portrait often appears as an emblematic figure within complex compositions, while nudes are situated in natural, urban or fantastic settings.

He also treated Biblical and religious subjects, including the Crucifixion, the Last Supper, the Virgin Mary and motherhood, as well as themes from Macedonian history. His later works addressed alienation, urbanisation, threats to the natural environment, war and the degradation of contemporary civilisation. Megalopolis 1 and Megalopolis 2 (1979) were associated with the dangers of urban development, while a number of other compositions depicted environmental destruction and devastated landscapes.

Throughout his work, realistically modelled figures and objects are combined with fantastic, allegorical and unreal scenes. According to Vladimir Velichkovski, realism remained a persistent foundation of Efremov's art, interwoven with surreal and fantastic imagery, personal memory and dream images; the resulting work consequently has a pronounced autobiographical component.

== Critical reception ==
Critical writing on Efremov has usually considered his paintings in the context of Macedonian surrealism and fantastic art. In 1966, Boris Petkovski connected Efremov's early work with the Belgrade surrealist circle and observed a transition from glossy, romantic and dreamlike surfaces towards a muted palette and denser compositions. In the 1987 Likovna enciklopedija Jugoslavije, Petkovski stated that Efremov had developed a "special symbolic variant of surrealism".

Writing about the 1975 exhibition Macedonian Surrealists in Belgrade, Milosav Lazarević described Efremov as an artist with a particularly sensitive temperament and rich, vibrant colour, while also noting his strong orientation towards Dalí and the need for more independent invention. Urošević later identified Efremov and Kole Manev as the most prominent Macedonian adherents of surrealism, emphasising their use of incompatible elements and the inclusion of motifs drawn from Macedonian land and culture.

The National Gallery has described Efremov as one of the leading representatives of surrealist painting in Macedonia. In its announcement of the 2025 retrospective, his oeuvre was presented as significant within the wider development of modern Macedonian visual art.

== Selected works ==
- Self-Portrait (1958, tempera on paper)
- Exalted Thought (1965–1969)
- S.O.S. in Medovija (1969)
- Bloody Macedonian Epiphany (1970)
- Mannequins, Mediocres and Sacred Remains (1969–1970)
- Night Beach on the Ibex (1971)
- Coincidental Solitude (1974)
- Eclipse (1975, drypoint)
- Hello (1975, drypoint)
- Megalopolis (1979)
- Endangered Space (1980)
- Lovers (1986)
- From Sunrise to Sunset (1988)
- The Painter's Breakfast (1988)
- The Last Supper (1989)
- Homage to Danilo Kiš (1992)
- Narcosphere (1998)
- Heavenly and Earthly Mother Teresa (1999–2000)
- Pavel Shatev Leaves the Burning Ship Guadalquivir (2014)

== Gallery ==
The following paintings are reproduced in the 2025 retrospective catalogue.

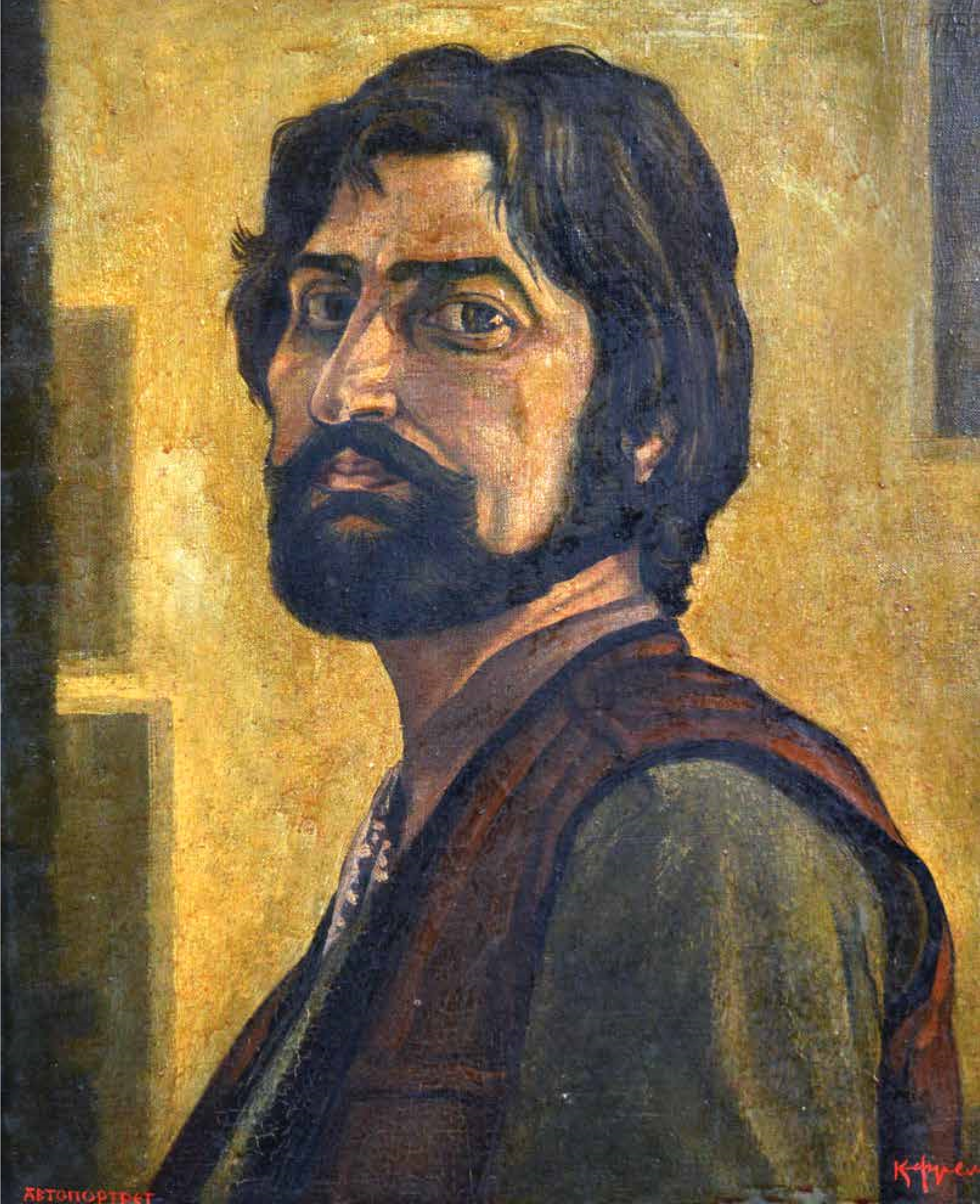
Self-Portrait (1973), oil on canvas, 50 × 40 cm

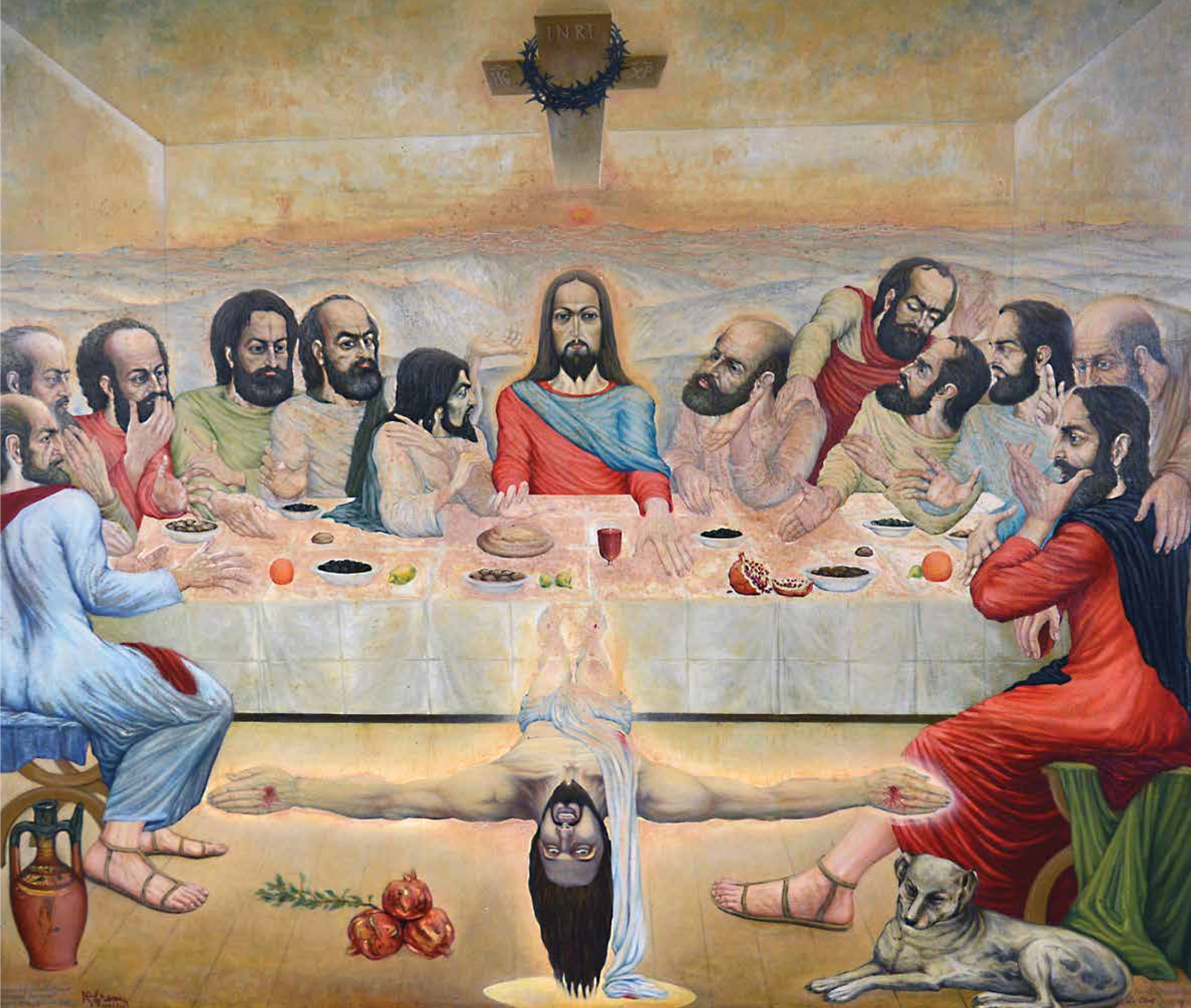
The Last Supper (1989), oil on canvas, 128 × 149.5 cm

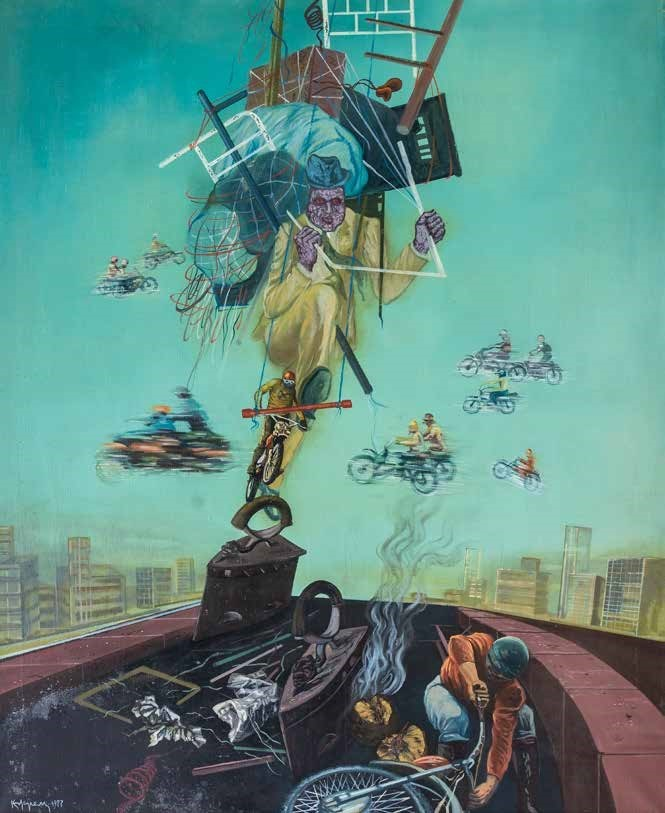
Civilization (1977), oil on canvas, 120 × 100 cm

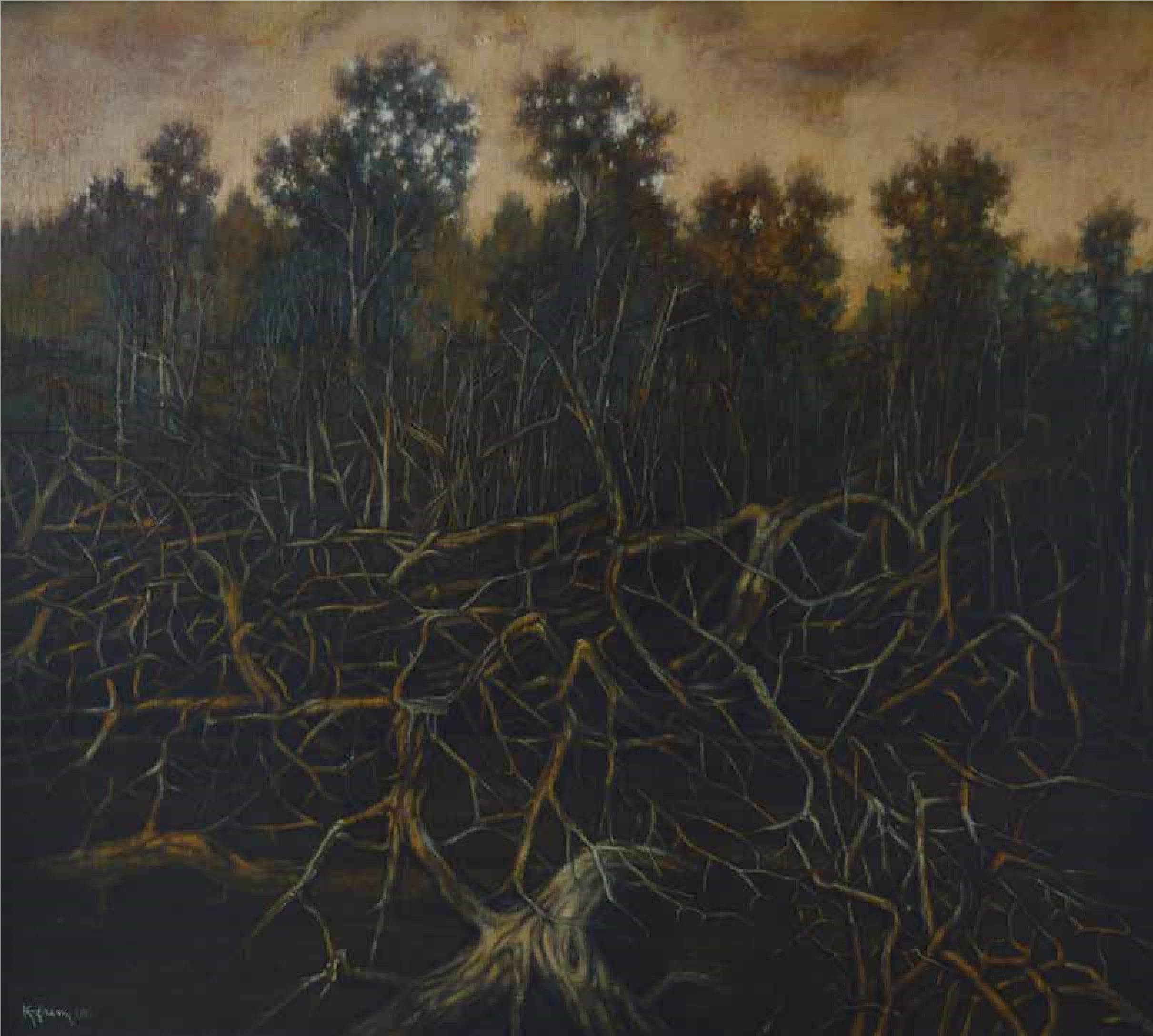
Metastasis (1981), oil on canvas, 100 × 120 cm

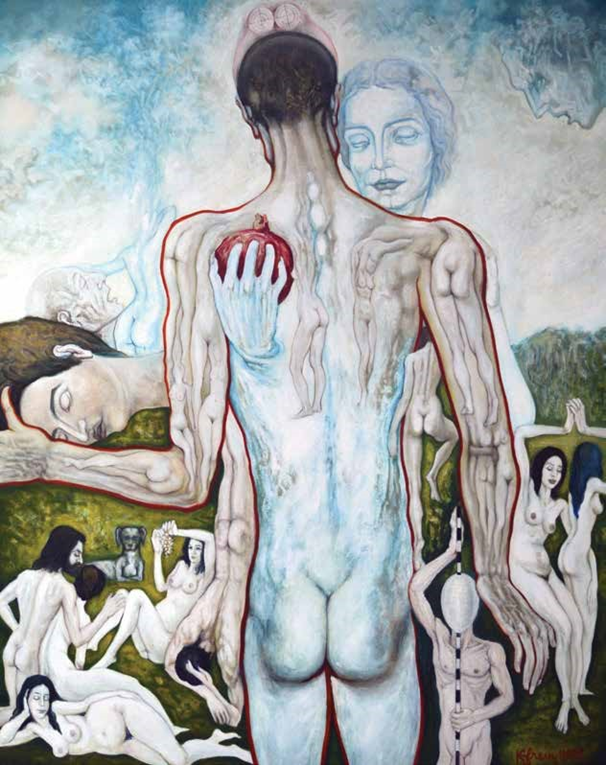
Homo Eroticus (1997–1998), oil on canvas, 120 × 100 cm

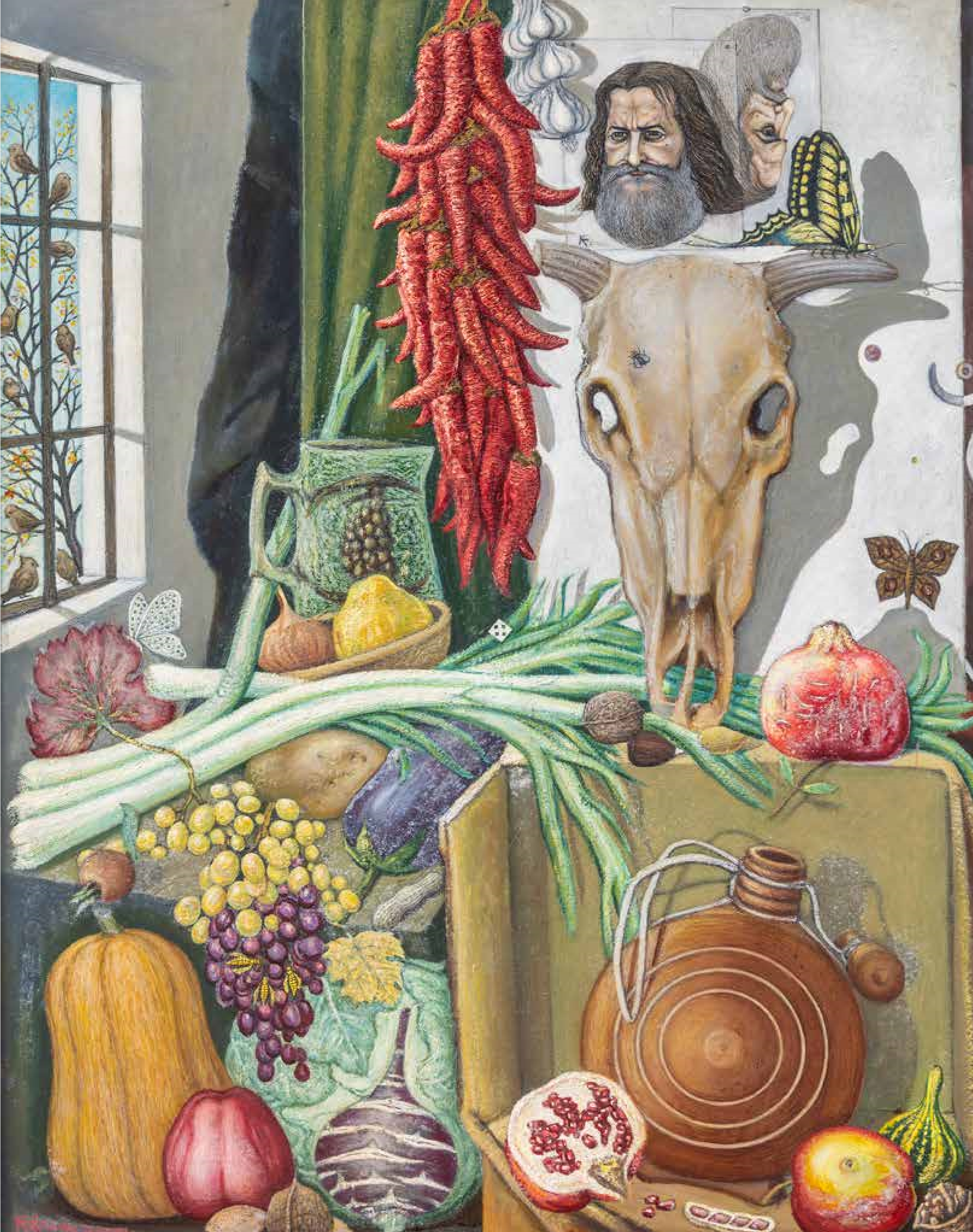
Mature Autumn (2001–2002), oil on canvas, 89.5 × 65 cm

== Exhibitions ==
Efremov mounted more than 50 solo exhibitions and participated in approximately 100 group exhibitions in Macedonia and abroad. The biographical chronology in the 2025 retrospective catalogue lists the following solo exhibitions:

- 1954 — Štip
- 1961 — Štip, National Museum
- 1965 — Štip, Adult Education Centre
- 1966 — Skopje, Cultural and Information Centre
- 1967 — Strumica, Adult Education Centre
- 1969 — Skopje, Cultural and Information Centre; Kumanovo, Art Gallery
- 1971 — Štip, Adult Education Centre
- 1972 — Skopje, Art Gallery
- 1981 — Štip, MK Astibo
- 1982 — Skopje, Makpetrol
- 1984 — Skopje, Art Gallery
- 1985 — Kavadarci, Museum-Gallery; Štip, Cultural Centre
- 1986 — Skopje, Cultural and Information Centre; Ljubljana, Gallery Komerc; Paris, Galerie E. Sandoz
- 1987 — Ohrid, Struga and Bitola
- 1996 — Skopje, MILS
- 2001 — Štip, Bezisten Gallery
- 2003 — Skopje, Cultural and Information Centre, retrospective exhibition
- 2025 — Skopje, National Gallery of the Republic of North Macedonia, retrospective exhibition

He took part in group exhibitions in Novi Sad, Slovenj Gradec, Ankara, Istanbul, Iași, Piatra Neamț, Ferrara, Belgrade, Rome, Tuzla, Banja Luka, Cetinje, Skopje, Strumica, Zrenjanin, Pristina, Paris, Požarevac and Gornji Milanovac, among other places.

During a stay in Paris in 1986, he held a solo exhibition at a gallery in the city. In 1996, as president of DLUM, he participated in a presentation of Macedonian artists at the Cité internationale des arts in Paris.

=== Between Reality and Dreams retrospective ===
The retrospective exhibition Between Reality and Dreams opened at the Daut Pasha Hamam in Skopje on 25 December 2025 and remained on display in January 2026. It was curated by Gorančo Gjorgjievski, and the accompanying monographic study was written by Professor Vladimir Velichkovski.

The exhibition catalogue was published by the National Gallery of the Republic of North Macedonia and edited by Ali Sinani, in a print run of 300 copies. Its photographs were produced by Toše Ristov and Igor Vasilev, and it was published in Macedonian, Albanian and English.

== Awards and honours ==
- Eighth of November Award of the Assembly of the Municipality of Štip
- Lazar Ličenoski Award of DLUM
- Kliment Ohridski Award of the National and University Library and DLUM
- Second prize for portraiture at an exhibition in Tuzla, awarded for a portrait of Josip Broz Tito

== Collections and representation ==
Efremov's works are held by the National Gallery of the Republic of North Macedonia, the Museum of Contemporary Art in Skopje, the Art Gallery in Kumanovo, and the Institute and Museum in Štip. His works are also held in private collections in Skopje, Belgrade, Zagreb, Sarajevo, Ljubljana, Paris, London, Stockholm, Bern and Zürich.

The National Gallery holds Mannequins, Mediocres and Sacred Remains (1969–1970), while Pavel Shatev Leaves the Burning Ship Guadalquivir was exhibited at the Museum of the Macedonian Struggle in Skopje.

Efremov was included in reference publications including Who's Who in Yugoslavia, the Likovna enciklopedija Jugoslavije, and Boris Petkovski's study Contemporary Macedonian Painting.

== Poetry and art writing ==
In addition to his visual art, Efremov wrote poetry. He published the collections:

- Okovano oko (Macedonian: Оковано око; Shackled Eye, 1994)
- Lačoozar (Macedonian: Лачоозар, 2001)

The collections drew on Biblical motifs and were illustrated with the artist's own vignette drawings. He also published art essays, reviews and catalogue texts in Razgledi, Sovremenost and Delo.
