= Irena Georgieva =

Bulgarian tourism businesswoman and politician

- Ирена Георгиева

Acting Minister of Tourism
- In office 19 February 2026 – 8 May 2026
- Prime Minister: Andrey Gyurov
- Preceded by: Miroslav Borshosh
- Succeeded by: Ilin Dimitrov

Personal details
- Education: Sofia University

Irena Nikolaeva Georgieva (Bulgarian: Ирена Николаева Георгиева) is a Bulgarian tourism businesswoman and politician who served as the acting Minister of Tourism of Bulgaria in 2026. She served as Deputy Minister of Tourism between 2015 and 2026 and represented Bulgaria in the European Travel Commission between 2021 and 2023.

== Career ==
Georgieva obtained a degree in sociology from Sofia University and has developed her professional career in the tourism sector.

Since 2006, she has been a member of the Association of Bulgarian Tour Operators and Travel Agents, which she led between 2009 and 2011. Between 2010 and 2012, Georgieva chaired the European Travel Agents' and Tour Operators' Associations, and between 2021 and 2023, she represented Bulgaria on the executive board of the European Travel Commission. She was Deputy Minister of Tourism between 2015 and 2026. In February 2026, Georgieva was appointed advisor to the Minister of Tourism Miroslav Borshosh.

On 18 February 2026 Georgieva was announced as the new Minister of Tourism of the caretaker cabinet of Prime Minister Andrey Gyurov and was sworn in on 19 February 2026. She stated that there would be some continuity with her predecessor's tourism policies, as well as an emphasis on sustainable tourism development, improving the tourism business ecosystem, and establishing Bulgaria as a competitive tourist destination.
