= Radina Borshosh =

Bulgarian stage and film actress

- Радина Боршош
- Born: December 31, 1997 (age 28); Sofia, Bulgaria
- Education: Krastyo Sarafov National Academy for Theatre and Film Arts (2016–2020)
- Occupation: Actress
- Years active: 2013-present
- Parents: Miroslav Borshosh (father); Iskra Vladimirova (mother)

Radina Miroslavova Borshosh (Bulgarian: Радина Мирославова Боршош) (born December 31, 1997) is a Bulgarian stage and film actress.

She is best known for portraying Anya in Bulgarian short film Solveig (2015), Iva in the Bulgarian drama film Monkey (2016), Desi in Bulgarian sitcom Us, ours and yours (2017), Fausta in British documentary series Eight Years That Made Rome (2017), Sonya in Attraction (2018), Raya Bozhinova in Strawberry Moon (2020) and Heaven in Dante's Heaven (2021).

She is also known for voicing the Bulgarian dub of Aurora in Disney's Maleficent: Mistress of Evil (2019).

== Biography ==
Radina Borshosh was born on December 31, 1997, in Sofia, Bulgaria. She is the daughter of the Bulgarian politician Miroslav Borshosh and TV journalist Iskra Vladimirova. In 2020, she graduated from the National Academy for Theatre and Film Arts in Stefan Danailov's last class with a degree in drama theatre.

Borshosh is part of the acting troupe of Ivan Vazov National Theatre. Her stage performances include The Little Foxes by Lillian Hellman, Three Tall Women by Edward Albee, When Thunder Strikes, The Echo Fades by Peyo Yavorov, Duel, Oh, You Whoever You Are... and A New Land by Ivan Vazov, and The Tempest by William Shakespeare, directed by Robert Wilson.

In 2013, she made her film debut in Bulgarian TV series Nedadenite, produced by her father Miroslav Borshosh, in a little role as a Liza's classmate in episode 8.

She later appeared in other movies and TV series, including Solveig, Monkey, Us, ours and yours, Attraction, Strawberry Moon and Dante's Heaven.

She is the voice of Aurora in the Bulgarian dub of Disney's Maleficent: Mistress of Evil.

She played the lead role in the drama TV series Walk of Fame, which was broadcast on Nova.

== Filmography ==
Year	Title	Role	Notes
2013	Nedadenite	Lisa's classmate	TV series; 1 episode
2015	Solveig	Anya	Short film
2016	Monkey	Iva	Feature film
2017	Us, ours and yours	Despina "Desi"	TV series; 24 episodes
2017	Eight Days That Made Rome	Fausta	Documentary series; 8th episode, titled The Rebirth of Rome
2018	Attraction	Sonya	Feature film
2019	Maleficent: Mistress of Evil	Aurora	Voice role; Bulgarian dub
2020	Strawberry Moon	Raya Bozhinova	TV series; 12 episodes
2021	Dante's Heaven	Raya (Heaven)	Feature film
2023	The Walk of Fame	Allie	TV series; 39 episodes
2025	The Wheels of Heaven	Petra	Post-production

== Personal life ==
She is married to the photographer Vladimir Tomashevich in June 2023.
