= Bobby Stojanov Varga =

Macedonian painter (born 1972)

Bobby Stojanov Varga (Macedonian: Боби Стојанов Варга) is a Macedonian painter. He was born 8 November 1972 in Titov Veles. He holds a master's degree in painting at Ss. Cyril and Methodius University of Skopje, in the class of Professor Simon Shemov with a specialty in handmade paper.

Varga has had eight personal exhibitions in Macedonia and over 80 group exhibitions in Macedonia and abroad. Since 2005, Varga has been the owner of Custom Airbrush VARGA studio, working on custom painting of motorcycles, cars, guitars, and computers.
