= Glisha Kostovski =

Macedonian wood carver

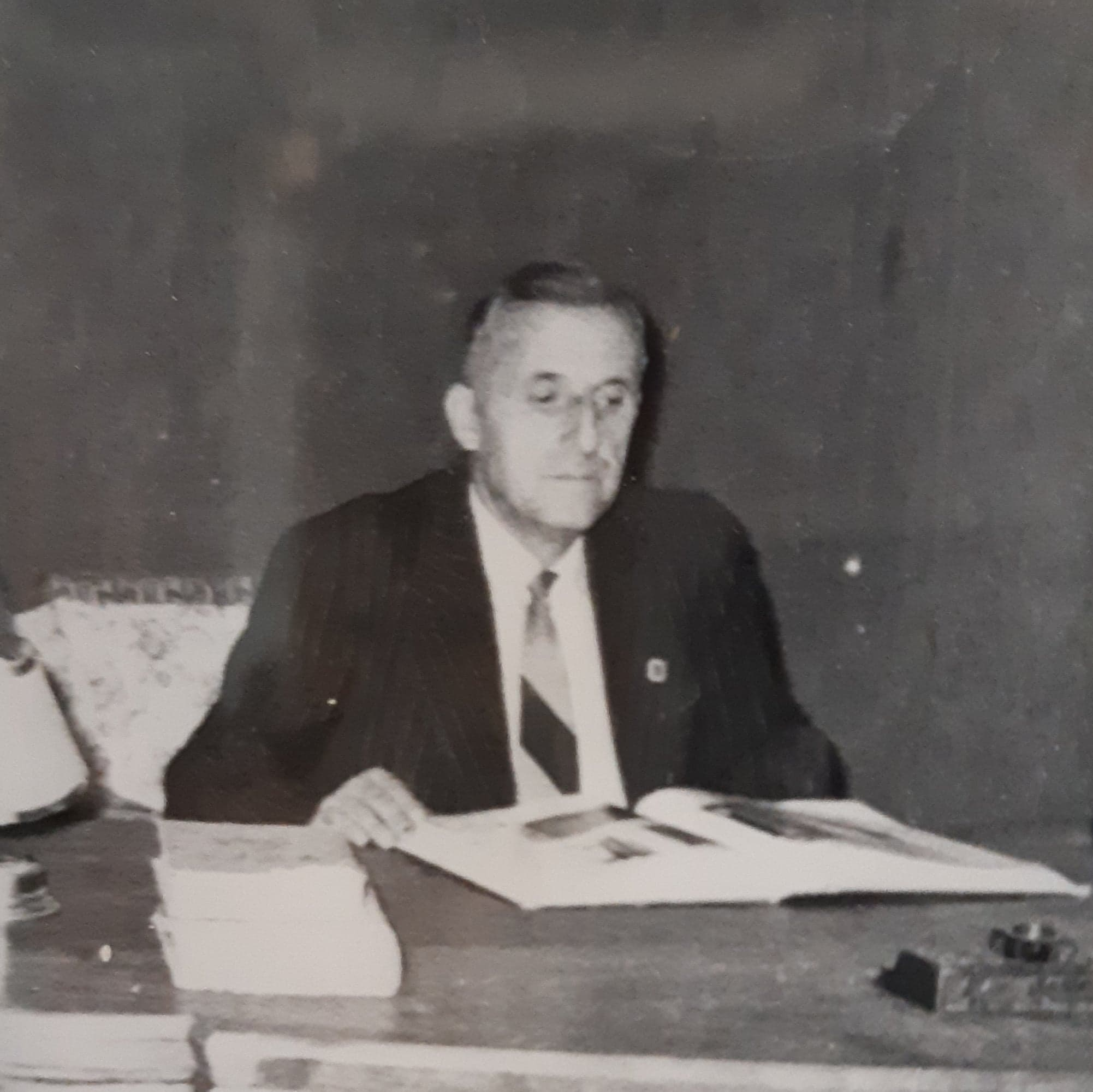
- Born: Tetovo, Yugoslavia
- Education: Academy for wood crafters in Belgrade
- Awards: Belgrade exhibition of crafters of Yugoslavia

Glisha Kostovski, during the Serbian times Glisha Kostich, was a Macedonian wood carver. Together with his group he has made some of the most impressive wood carvings in Yugoslavia. He was born in the city of Tetovo. His wood carvings were mostly done for private purposes, but with the economical development of the country, he started making carvings for the government and churches. In the beginning, his work was not very respected, but close to his death, he started earning more; although his disciples continued to operate, they were not successful.

== His works ==
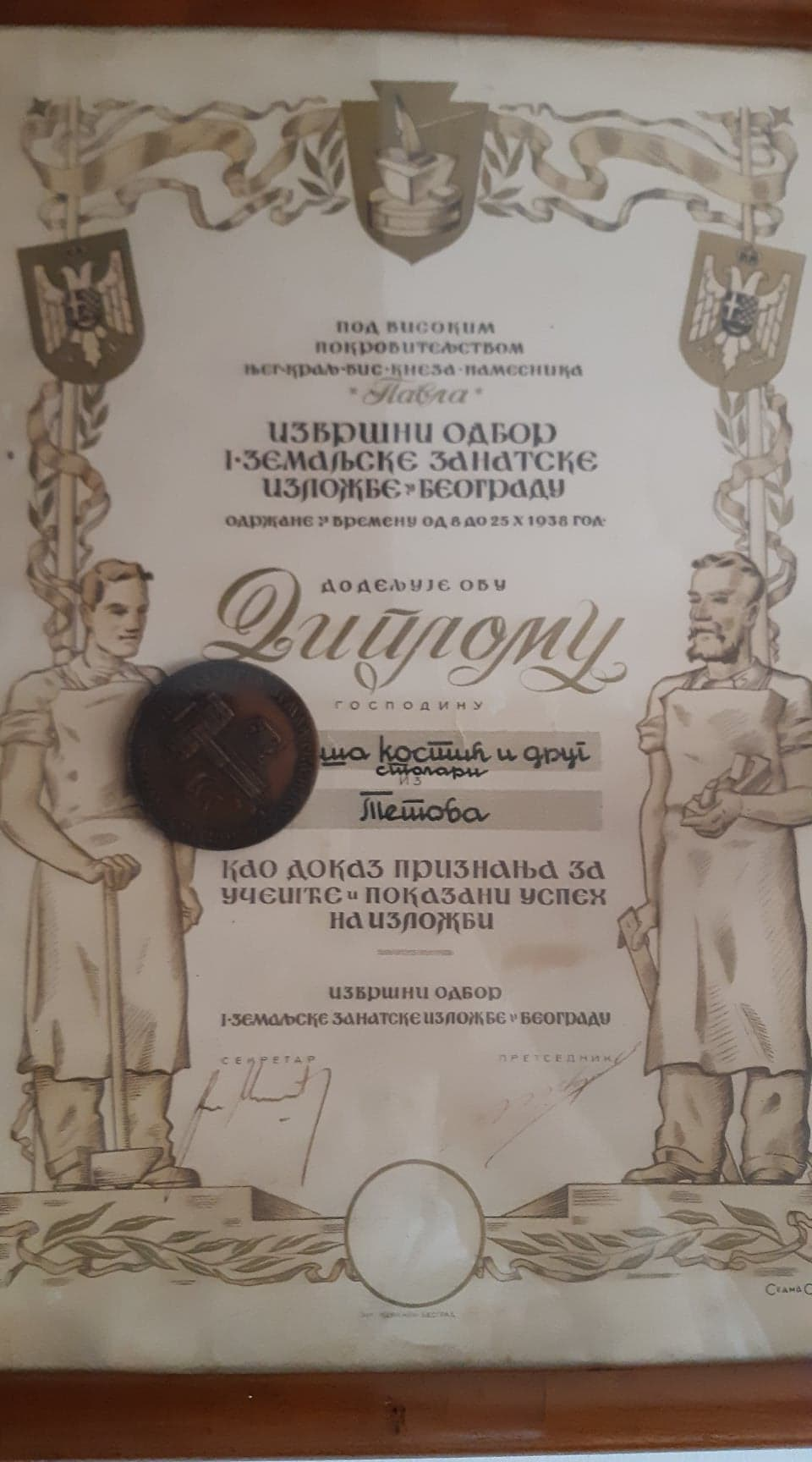
Honour to Glisha Kostovski from Belgarde association of Yugoslavian crafters

His works can be found in a lot of churches in Macedonia, but the most important works can be found in two main cathedrals of the Orthodox church of Macedonia, Saint Jovan Bigorski Monastery and Church of the Holy Mother of God. His most impressive work can be found in the building of the Government of the Republic of North Macedonia.

His works were mostly made from walnut and chestnut trees, which are characteristic for the western parts of Macedonia.

=== The Dealborez Hall in the Governmental building. ===
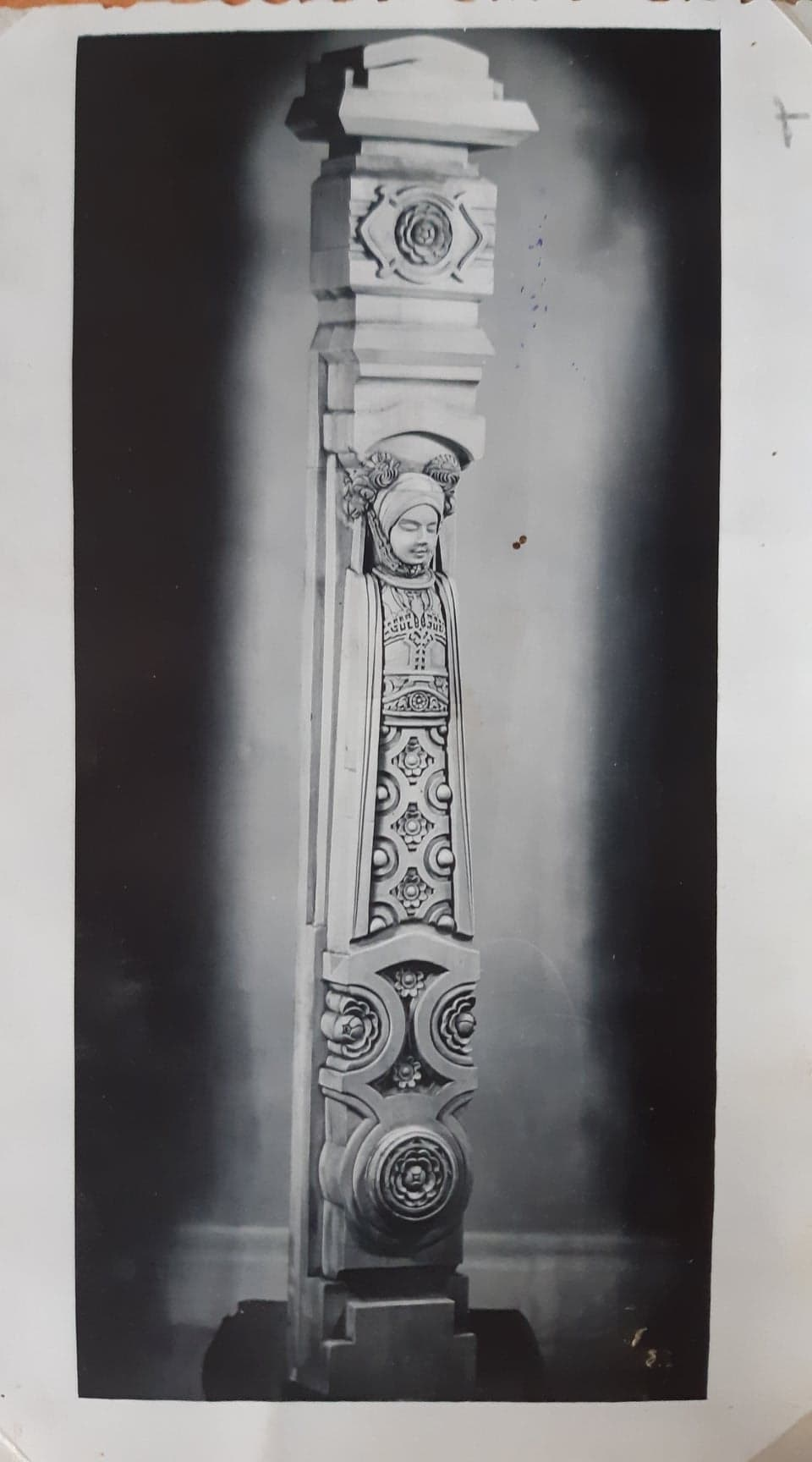
His work presenting Cleopatra (Macedonian woman)

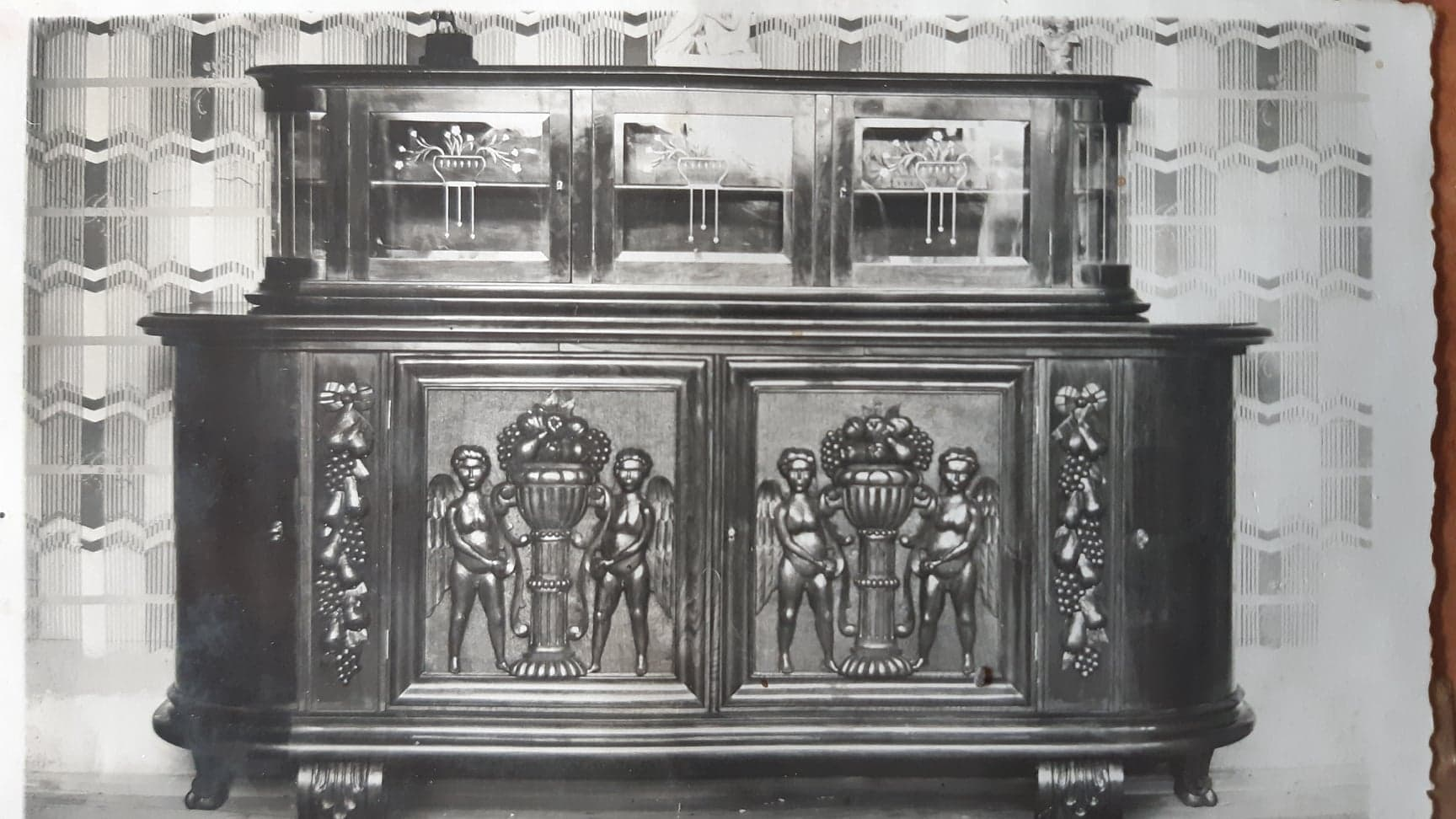
His work

The Hall is known as the most impressive works in Macedonia. The hall is known as a favorite of many presidents of the Government.

The Delaborez Hall is part of the Cabinet of the President of the Assembly and is used for the protocol needs of the Speaker of the Assembly of the Republic of Macedonia.

=== Interior ===
The decoration of the hall was designed and designed from 1935 to 1937. Performed in 1938 by Glisha Kostovski, a carpenter and carpenter from Tetovo, who did all his work with his typhoon. The walls and ceiling are fully lined with shallow wood and deep carving, with ornamental content incorporated and applied geometric, vegetable and other motifs.
