= Gligor Stefanov =

Gligor Stefanov (born 1956 in Kavadarci, Macedonia) is a Macedonian and Canadian sculptor and environmental installation artist, who lives in Windsor, Ontario, Canada.

== Education and career ==
He graduated at the Belgrade Art Academy with an M.A. Gligor Stefanov has participated in eighteen one-man exhibitions and in more than 100 group exhibitions in many countries, including the Venice Biennale, in Italy. Since the late 1990s he has been involved with Byzantine Iconography and installations.

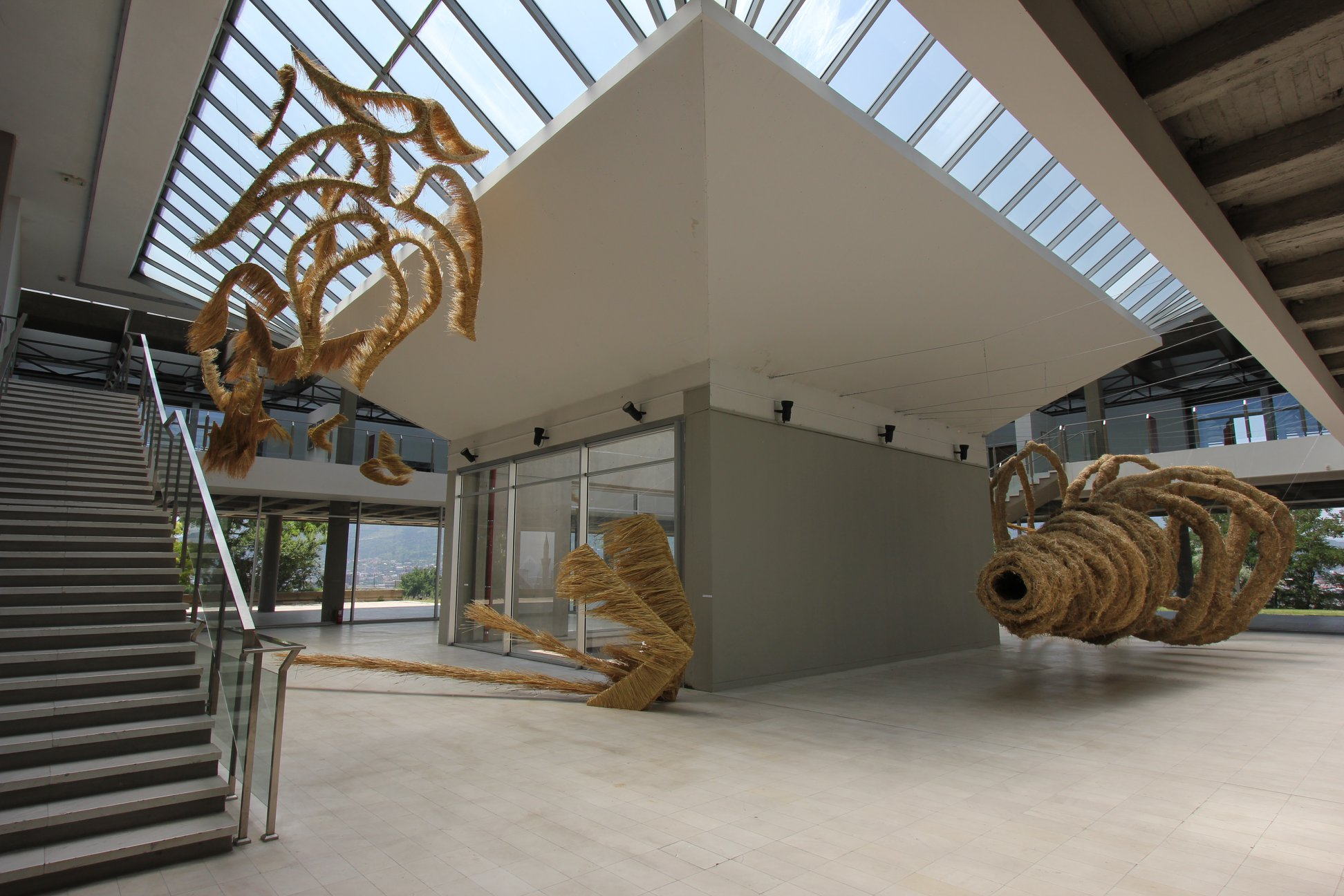

== Artist style ==
He creates site-specific works, paintings and drawings, religious and eco-art with organic materials. From the beginning of his career, Stefanov treated sculpture as an object or an installation of objects situated in space. In 1988, narrative aspects of his work shifted from mythology to religion. In the late 1980s and early 1990s, he produced a series of objects and installations, in the form of angels' wings and discs, executed in straw and boards or tree trunks and branches.

== One-man exhibitions ==
- 1972 – Kavadarci, Library Exhibition Hall (drawings&paintings)
- 1974 – Kavadarci, Culture Center (paintings)
- 1981 – Kavadarci, Town Square – Installations
- 1982 – Pazin – Installation with Grass in the Park
- – Skopje, Museum of Contemporary Art – Installation with Cotton
- – Kavadarci, Luna Gallery (drawings)
- – Pazin, Culture Center, Environment's Rhythms (drawings and installation)
- 1983 – Skopje, 25 May Gallery – Linear Intervention
- 1984 – Zagreb, SC Gallery – Linear Intervention
- – Belgrade, SKC Gallery – Linear Intervention
- 1985 – Belgrade, FLU Gallery (objects)
- 1986 – Skopje, Museum of Contemporary Art (objects and installations)
- 1989 – London, Whitechapel Art Gallery – Broadgate Sculpture Project
- 1990 – Grizedale Forest Sculpture Park, Cumbria, England – Cherubic Wings (sculpture)
- 1991 – Cirencester, England – Seraphim (objects and installations)
- – London, Docklands – Cherubim (sculpture)
- – Dublin, Temple Bar – Guardian Angel (installation)
- 1993 – Venice, 45th Biennale – Representative of Macedonia (with Petre Nikoloski)

== Group exhibitions ==
Stefanov has participated in more than 100 group exhibitions since 1973, among which are:

- 1977 – Rijeka (Croatia) – 9th Biennial of Yugoslav Young Artists-Modern Gallery (also 13th, 1985 and 14th Biennial,1987)
- 1977 – Belgrade (Yugoslavia) – 8th Exhibition of drawings by students of FLU, Gallery of the Young (also 9th, and 10th exhibitions)
- 1981 – Belgrade – 65th Exhibition of the Society of Artists at the Cvijeta Zuzoric Art Pavilion
- 1982 – Skopje (Macedonia), Museum of Contemporary Art – "Young Generation"
- 1983 – Skopje, 25 May Gallery-Macedonian Art in the last year "Critics Choice
- - Skopje, Museum of Contemporary Art – "20 Years of the Museum"
- 1984 – Skopje,25 May Gallery – "New Tendencies in Macedonian Art in the last Decade"
- - Skopje, Museum of Contemporary Art – "40 Years of Macedonian Art" – Belgrade, Cvijeta Zuzoric Art Pavilion (drawing and sculpture)
- - Sombor – 8th Triennial of Yugoslav Drawings, City Museum (also 9th,1987)
- - Zrenjanin (Yugoslavia) – 2nd Biennial Yugoslav Art, National Museum
- 1985 – Sarajevo (Bosnia), Collegium Artisticum -"View of the 80s"(Critics Choice)
- - Pancevo – 3rd Exhibition of Yugoslav Sculpture, Contemporary Art Gallery (also 4th, 1987 and 5th Biennial,1989)
- - Belgrade, Cvijeta Zuzoric Art Pavilion -"In the Meantime" (Critics Choice)
- - Banja Luka, Art Gallery – "Material as a Challenge" (Critics Selection)
- - Murska Sobota (Slovenia), DE Gallery; Ljubljana, Cankar House and Piran, Embankment Gallery – 8th Biennial of Yugoslav Sculpture (also 9th Biennial)
- 1986 – Zagreb, Gallery of Contemporary Art; Belgrade, Museum of Contemporary Art;
- - Skopje, Museum of Contemporary Art – "Six Macedonian Artists – From the Miraculousness of the Meadow to the Joy of Living"
- - Sarajevo, Collegium Artisticum – "Art and Criticism in the Mid-80s"
- - Skopje, Museum of Macedonia – "80s in Macedonian Contemporary Art"
- - Vienna (Austria), Hoshcule fur Angewandle Kunst; Graz, Kunstlerhaus und Neue Gallerie; Klagenfurt, Kunstlerhaus – "Young Yugoslav Art"
- 1987 – Banja Luka, Art Gallery – "The Loneliest" (Critics Selection)
- - Skopje, Museum of Contemporary Art – First Biennial of Young Artists
- - Sarajevo, Collegium Artisticum – "Yugoslav Documenta" (Critics Selection)
- - Athena (Greek), National Pinacoteca – "Contemporary Yugoslav Art"
- - Salzburg (Austria), Salzburgger Kunstverein; Dubrovnik (Croatia), Art Gallery; Bratislava (Slovakia), Slovenska Narodna Galeria; Ljubljana (Slovenia), Modern Gallery; Prague (Czech), U Hubernu; Zagreb, Gallery of Contemporary Art; Belgrade, Museum of Contemporary Art; "Young Yugoslav Art" (Tour Exhibition-Critics Selection)
- 1988 – Belgrade, Exhibition Hall – 6th Triennial of Yugoslav Art
- - Skopje, 25 May Gallery – Drawings of Young Macedonian Artists
- - Zagreb, PM Art Pavilion and Gallery – "Young Selection"
- - Skopje, 25 May Gallery – "Environmental Sculptures"
- 1989-London(England), Whitechapel Art Gallery – Broadgate Sculpture Project
- - Sarajevo, Skenderija – "Yugoslav Documenta" (Critics Selection)
- - Carcassonne (France), Musee des Beaux Arts; Les Sables d'Olonne, Musee de l'Abbaye Sainte-Croix – "Avant-Gardes Yougoslaves"
- 1990 – Toulon (France), Musee d'Art – "Avant-Gardes Yougoslaves"
- - Grizedale Sculpture Park, Cumbria (England)
- 1991 – Dublin (Ireland) – Sculpture Trail
- - London, Docklands (England) – Outside Art
- - Leicester (England), Abbey Park – Installations in the Park
- 1993 – Venice (Italy) – 45th Biennial, Macedonian Selection (with Petre Nikoloski)
- 1994 – Budapest, Ernest Museum-"Nature and Art in Central Europe" (Macedonian Selection)
- - Nurnberg (Germany), Kunstbunker – Seven Macedonian Artists
- 1995 – Dresden(Germany), Kulturrathaus – Seven Macedonian Artists
- 1996 – Berlin, Medien Galerie – Five Artist from Macedonia
- 1998 – Skopje, Museum of Contemporary Art – Anthology of Macedonian Art
- 1999 – Skopje, National Gallery – 20th Century Macedonian Art
- 2002 – Skopje, Museum of Contemporary Art – "Transfiguration"
- - Novi Sad, Art Gallery – Balkan Art
- - Windsor, (Canada) – Artcite Gallery – "Artseen 10"
- 2003 – Windsor, (Canada) – Art Gallery of Windsor, -" RE: Wind"
- 2003 – Windsor, (Canada) – Smogfest

== Awards ==
- 1981: Prize for Drawings from ULUS, Belgrade
- 1981: Prize for Sculpture from FLU (Academy of Fine Arts), Belgrade
- 1982: Awards from MSU (Museum of Contemporary Art), Skopje
- 1983: Macedonian Annual Award of the "Mlad Borec" magazine, Skopje
- 1983: "Seven Secretaries of SKOJ" – Yugoslav Annual Award, Zagreb
- 1986: '7 September Annual Award, Kavadarci
- 1986: Prize for Drawings from MSU, Skopje
- 1987: Prize for Sculpture from MSU, Skopje
- 1991: Prize for Installation, Leicester
