= Poimeniko, Kastoria =

Village ruins in Greece

Poimeniko Ποιμενικό
- Settlement
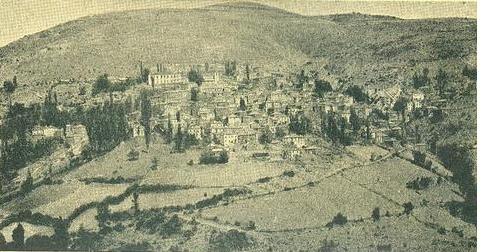

- Location within Greece
- Coordinates: 40°39′52″N 21°19′56″E
- Country: Greece
- Geographic region: Macedonia
- Administrative region: Western Macedonia
- Regional unit: Kastoria
- Municipality: Kastoria
- Municipal unit: Vitsi
- Time zone: UTC+2 (EET)
  - Summer (DST): UTC+3 (EEST)

Poimeniko (Greek: Ποιμενικό, before 1955: Βαψώριον – Vapsorion; Bulgarian and Macedonian: Бапчор, Bapchor or Bapčor) is an abandoned village in Kastoria Regional Unit, Macedonia, Greece, located 22 km north of the city of Kastoria.

Poimeniko was inhabited by a predominately Slav speaking population during the Ottoman period.

In 1913, with the conditions of the Treaty of Bucharest, when this part of Ottoman Macedonia became part of Greece, and after the Balkan Wars, a lot of locals emigrated to Bulgaria and USA. Following World War II and especially after heavy bombing during the Greek Civil War, the remaining inhabitants relocated to Yugoslavia, with many also migrating to Australia. By 1949, the village was abandoned.

In 1945, Greek Foreign Minister Ioannis Politis ordered the compilation of demographic data regarding the Prefecture of Kastoria. The village had a total of 820 inhabitants, and was populated by 810 Slavophones with a Bulgarian national consciousness.

The church of Saint George is the only remaining building and was renovated in 2018.
