= Nadja Petrovic =

Macedonian painter

- Надја Петровиќ
- Born: 20 July 1991 (age 35); Bitola, SR Macedonia
- Education: Accademia di Belle Arti, Florence; European School of Economics, Florence; Central Saint Martins, London
- Style: Figurative
- Website: www.nadjapetrovic.com

Nadja Petrovic (Macedonian: Надја Петровиќ, Nadja Petrovikj; born 20 July 1991) is a Macedonian painter. She was born in Bitola and lives in Skopje and Florence.

== Early life and education ==
Petrovic was born in Bitola. As a young girl she participated in the Small Monmartre of Bitola, winning the Macedonia Plaque. Subsequently, she began participation internationally and winning medals and awards in Bulgaria, Portugal and China from 2002 to 2003. She completed the Taki Daskalo Gymnasium in Bitola before attending several courses at Central Saint Martins College of Art and Design, London in 2009.

From 2010 to 2013 she studied her undergraduate degree in painting and drawing at the Accademia di Belle Arti in Florence. In 2017 she obtained a master's degree in visual arts and new expressive form at the same academy, and then studied arts and culture management at the European School of Economics, also in Florence.

== Works ==
Petrovic's works are described as large-scale figurative paintings with elements of abstraction, symbolism and conceptuality. The main focus of her works are "psychology and anthropology, societal norms and spiritual values". She has published a sizeable number works, mostly grouped in series.

- Under the Skin (Serie 2016)
- Sound of Silence (Serie 2017)
- Illusion of Reality (Serie 2018)

== Exhibitions ==
Petrovic has exhibited her works at various galleries and institutions around the world, including the following:

- Biggs Museum of American Art at Dover, Delaware, US (2019)
- Concomitant event in the Official Pavilion at the Venice Biennale (2019)
- Gallery MC, New York City, US (2019)
- Art San Diego, San Diego, US (2018)
- ArtBox New York, New York City, US (2018)
- Messe Wien, Vienna, Austria (2018)
- The Brick Lane Gallery, London (2017)
- NLB Gallery, Skopje, Macedonia (2017) - individual exhibition
