= Ljubomir Belogaski =

Macedonian artist (1911–1994)

- Born: 15 April 1911
- Died: 1994 (aged 82–83)
- Style: watercolours
- Awards: October Award of the Socialist Republic of Macedonia for Life Achievement

Ljubomir Belogaski was a Yugoslav painter, who specialised as a watercolourist working on landscapes. He was also an educator who worked in several high schools and at the School of Applied Arts in Skopje. He was born on 15 April 1911 in Delčevo. He died on 15 February 1994 in Skopje.

== Education, awards, and accomplishments ==
Belogaski was educated in Belgrade at the School of Art from 1931 to 1938. He also attended The Faculty of Fine Arts in Ljubljana where he specialized in graphic techniques.

His awards included: October Award of the Socialist Republic of Macedonia for Life Achievement in 1972, Medal of the Republic with silver ribbon in 1979, the 13th November Award in 1992.

In 2011, a Macedonian stamp was created to commemorate 100 years since his birth.

== Career ==
Belogaski was a watercolourist who most often worked within landscape environments. He was professor and pedagogue in several high schools and in the School of Applied Arts in Skopje, where he founded the Department of Graphic Arts in 1947. In 1949 he began teaching at the Department of architecture in Skopje, where he organized the course of Fine Arts and lectured drawing and watercolor painting. He was a member of the Association of Artists of Macedonia after 1845 and was also its President in 1957. He retired from teaching in 1981.

== Contributions ==
In 1991, Belogaski donated 159 of his works, including 125 watercolor works, 6 oils on canvas, 26 drawings and two graphic works, to the Museum of the City of Skopje.
