= Kole Manev =

Kole Manev (Macedonian: Коле Манев) (1941-) Born in Bapčor, Kastoria, Greece. Macedonian painter and film director.

== Education and career ==
Kole Manev is one of a group of refugee children, expelled during the Greek Civil War in 1948. He was educated in SFR Yugoslavia, in Skopje and Belgrade. He also studied in Paris and attended lectures in Prague for an animated film. He had several solo and group exhibitions in Macedonia, France and the countries of the region. In 2012, Manevv exhibited 29 paintings in the new multimedia center "House Exclusive".

== Awards and accomplishments ==
In 2006, Manev received the French Embassy decoration "Honorary Knight of Art" which is given to merited artists for engagement in the field of culture. One of his painting hangs in the Republic of Macedonia Lobby of the Cabinet of the President of Assembly. In 2001 during the annual celebration, the Day of the Macedonian Revolutionary Struggle on 23 October, Parliament presented Manev, along with writer Paskal Gilevski and university professor Tome Nenovski, the 23 October National Award.
