= Mice Jankulovski =

Macedonian painter, cartoonist and animator

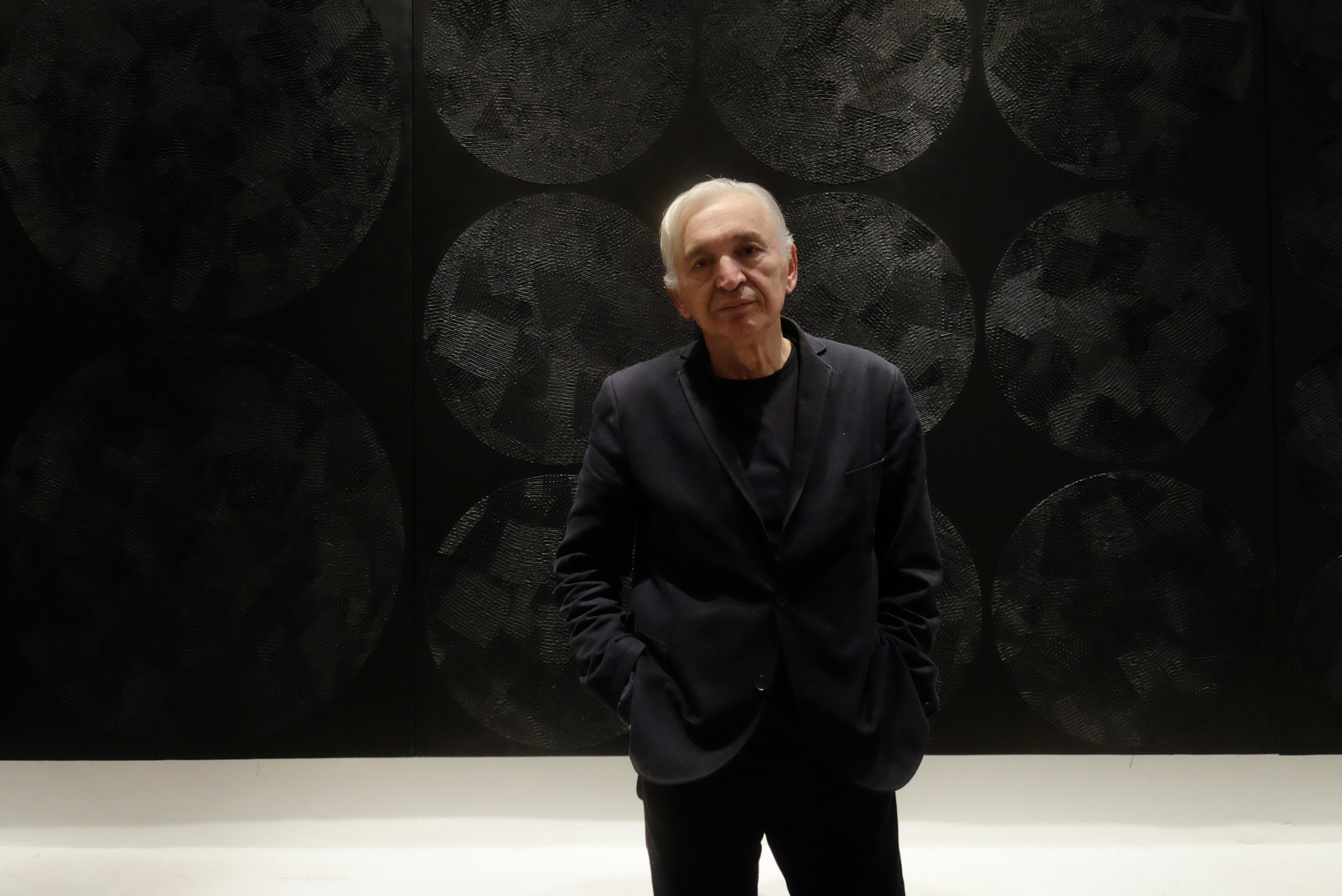
- Born: Micko Jankulovski; 2 June 1954 (age 71); Slivovo, Debarca, Macedonia, SFR Yugoslavia
- Occupations: animator, painter, cartoonist
- Years active: 1969

Micko "Mice" Jankulovski (Macedonian: Мице Јанкуловски) is a Macedonian painter, cartoonist, animator and public figure. For his artistic work he received many awards, among which El Greco Award for Best Artist at the Art Thessaloniki 2019, highly acclaimed prize for life achievement in painting Lorenzo Il Magnifico (Lorenzo the Magnificent) at the 12th Florence Biennale, and Artist of the World Award on the Larnaca Biennial 2018.

He lives and works in Skopje as a director of Osten Museum of Drawing, President of the Osten Biennial of Drawing, and President of the Association of Cartoonists of Macedonia.

== Art ==
=== Form 1 (1969–2016) ===
Jankulovski's first serious attempt at painting was with the painting titled "Creation" (1969), and then "The First Circle" (1969), painted in oil on canvas, consisting of organic circles. With these paintings begins his first and longest creative phase of organic forms in unorganized systems, later called "Form 1".

=== Form 2 (1988–2016) ===
In the following series of paintings entitled "Form 2", he approaches the shapes more closely, zooming in on the forms, leaving only minimal visual trace as curves and arches that separate two differently colored forms.

=== Form 3 (2011–present) ===
Starting in 2011, and exclusively since 2016, in his latest work, the series called "Form 3", he only paints with black pigment applied to the surface of the canvas in a thick layer, using different tools to make geometric shapes, lines or different scatters on the surface. Its purpose is to create an effect that responds to the change of direction of light, giving the observer different experiences as he moves in front of the paintings. Mice Jankulovski tries to restore analogue relation to art, allowing the viewer by walking around the space where the paintings are displayed to reveal how they are painted.
