= Turul =

Hungarian mythological bird and national symbol

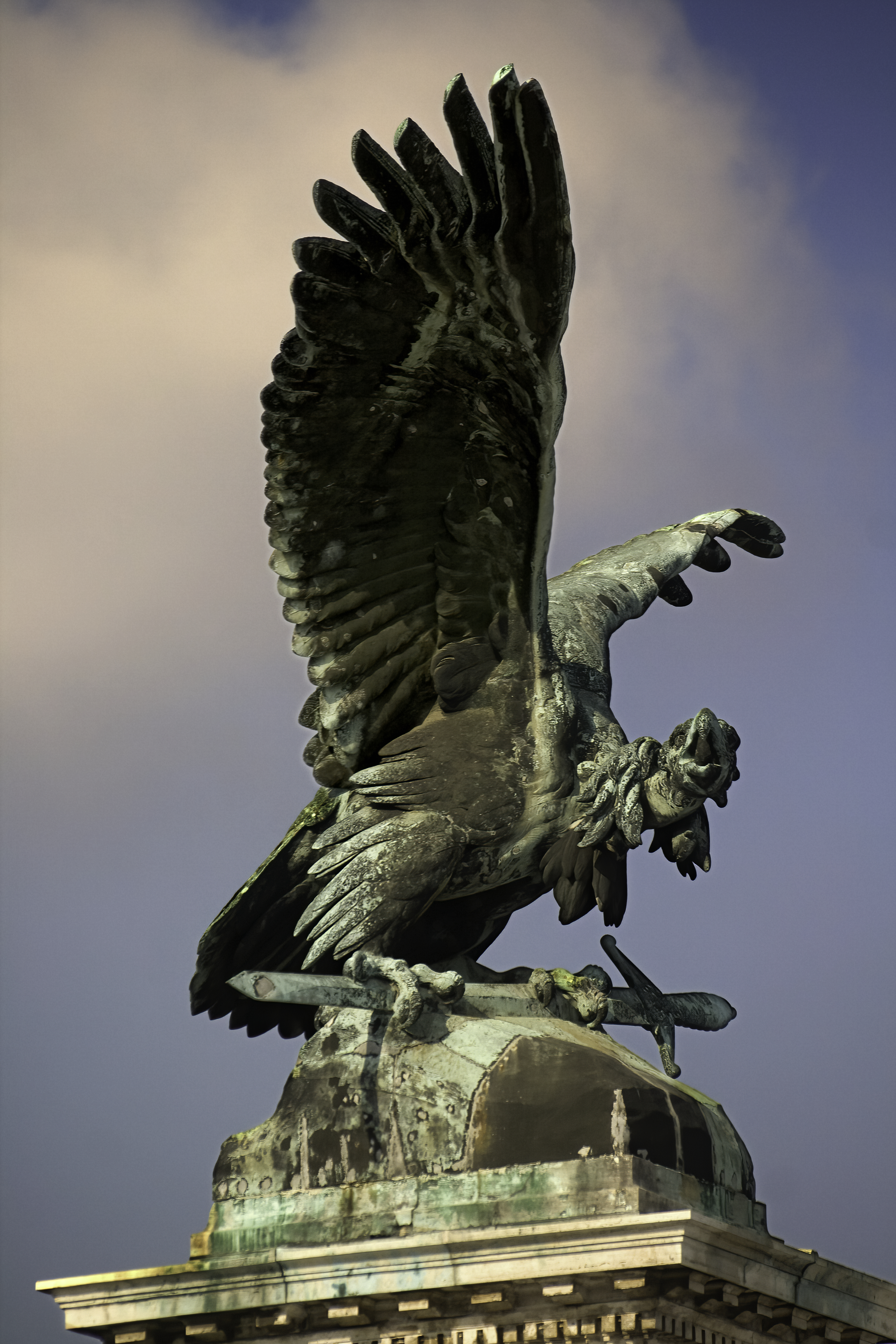
Turul bird on the Royal Castle, Budapest, Hungary

The Turul is a mythological bird of prey, mostly depicted as a falcon, in Hungarian tradition and Turkic tradition, and a national symbol of Hungarians.

== Origin ==
The Turul is probably based on a large falcon. The Hungarian word turul meant one kind of falcon and the origin of the word is currently thought to be most likely Turkic (Clauson 1972: 472.) (Róna-Tas et al. 2011:2: 954-56)), which is the language of origin of over 10% of words in modern Hungarian lexicon and the exonym "Hungarian" and the word "Hun". (Note: The Magyars had an extensive Turkic genetic and cultural influence, which accounts for the Turkic contribution to their lexicon, and Byzantines authors (Constantine) even mistakenly referred to them as Turks. Many Hungarian names, and also animal and plant names, are of Turkic origin. The majority of Hungarian tribal names were of Turkic origin. However, in spite of all this influence, and although they were long in contact with them, the Magyars are not a Turkic people.) Toġrïl or toğrul means a medium to large bird of prey of the family Accipitridae, goshawk or red kite. In Hungarian the word sólyom means falcon, and there are three ancient words describing different kinds of falcons: kerecsen [Greek κερχνηίς] (saker falcon), zongor [Turkish sungur = gyrfalcon] (which survives in the male name Csongor) and turul.

In the legend of Emese, recorded in the Gesta Hungarorum and the Chronicon Pictum, the turul is mentioned as occurring in a dream of Emese, when she was already pregnant. In older literature, this was interpreted as "impregnation", but the text is clear. The Turul's role is one of a protector spirit that protects the infant Álmos from harm. This is a very similar motif to the role of the Simurgh in the Iranian epic Shahnameh. In a second dream by the leader of the Hungarian tribes, in which eagles (the emblem of the Pechenegs, enemies of the Hungarians) attacked their horses and the Turul came and saved them. The image of the Turul and its role is similar to that of the Norse Vedfolnir, which like it perched on the tree of life. (Note: The Veldfolnir actually perched on an unnamed eagle that itself perched on top of the world tree Yggdrasil.) The Huns reportedly also used the image of the eagle, which for them symbolized the leader. The image of a bird of prey was extremely popular in Saka-Scythian culture. More broadly, this image was common among the nomads of Central Asia. Rather than belonging to a specific ethnic group, it was widespread across the steppe, and the union of a falcon and a woman is "firmly located in a shamanic religio-mythical universe." A prominent example among similar legends is that of the Mongols, contained in The Secret History of the Mongols, where Genghis Khan's mother-in-law dreams that an eagle holding the sun and the moon in its claws lands on her hand, in anticipation of the birth of the Mongolian royal dynasty. In some parts of Kazakhstan and Kyrgyzstan, Kazakhs and Kyrgyz carry falcons inside the yurt during childbirth, because their eyes are said to stave off demons that attack pregnant women during childbirth. Macdonald calls it a "practical use" of the falcons' association with fertility.

A pair of silver disk with Turul motive was found in Rakamaz, Hungary from a 10th century Hungarian cemetery. The most beautiful ornament of noble Hungarian women was a pair of decorative disks hanging from the end of the hair braid.

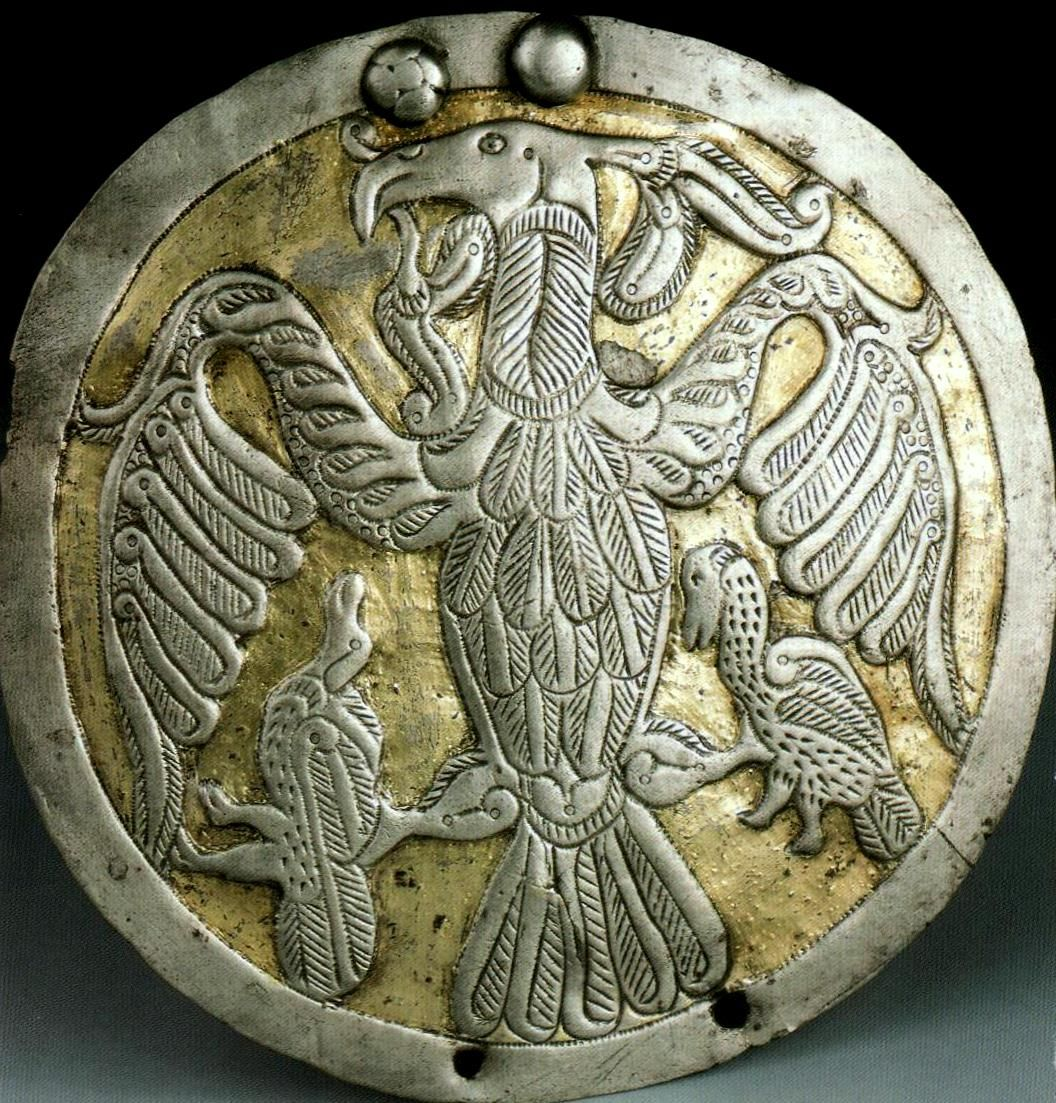
A pair of silver hair decoration disk with motive of mythic Turul bird from a 10th century Hungarian cemetery (Found in Rakamaz, Hungary) Jósa András Museum in Nyíregyháza, Hungary

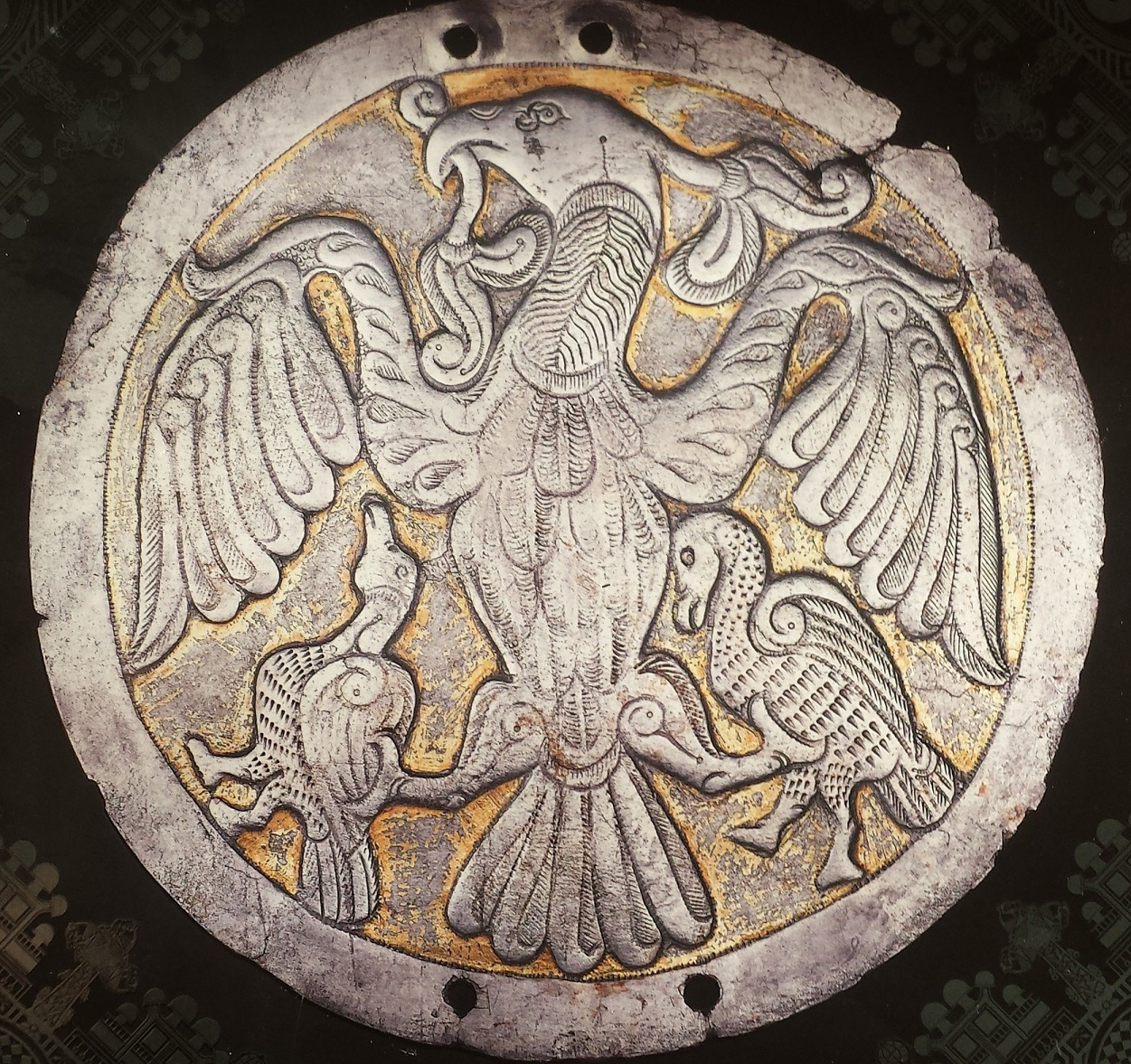
The other part of the pair of the silver hair decoration disk with motive of mythic Turul bird from a 10th century Hungarian cemetery (Found in Rakamaz, Hungary)

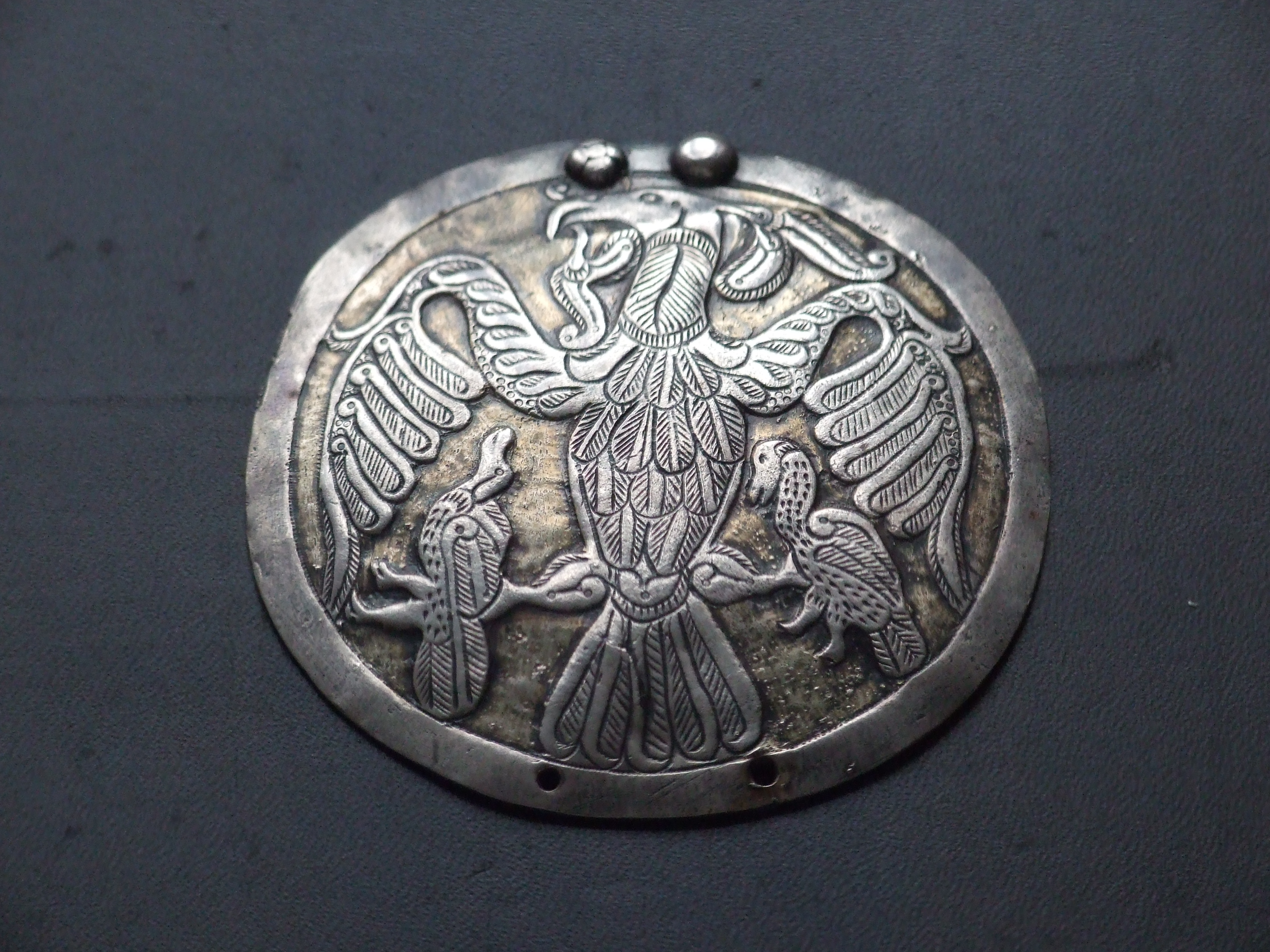
Gilt silver disk with Turul motif (Hungary, 10th century), National Museum in Prague (temporary exhibition)

== Turul dynasty ==
In Hungarian tradition, it originated as the clan symbol used in the 9th and 10th centuries by the ruling Árpád dynasty. The Árpád dynasty was the ruling dynasty of the Principality of Hungary in the 9th and 10th centuries and of the Kingdom of Hungary from 1000 to 1301. The Árpád dynasty is also referred to as the Turul dynasty.

The Gesta Hunnorum et Hungarorum mentioned that the Árpád dynasty descended from the gens (clan) Turul, and the Gesta Hungarorum recorded that the Árpád's totemic ancestor was the Turul.

And among the captains, Árpád the son of Álmos, son of Előd, son of Ügyek, from the Turul clan, was richer in wealth and more powerful in war.

— Simon of Kéza: Gesta Hunnorum et Hungarorum

Duke Géza from the Turul clan was the one who, as they say, was the first among the Hungarians who got a summon from heaven in order to receive the Christian faith and baptism.

— Simon of Kéza: Gesta Hunnorum et Hungarorum

In the legend of Emese, recorded in the Gesta Hungarorum and the Chronicon Pictum, the Turul is mentioned as occurring in a dream of Emese, when she was already pregnant.

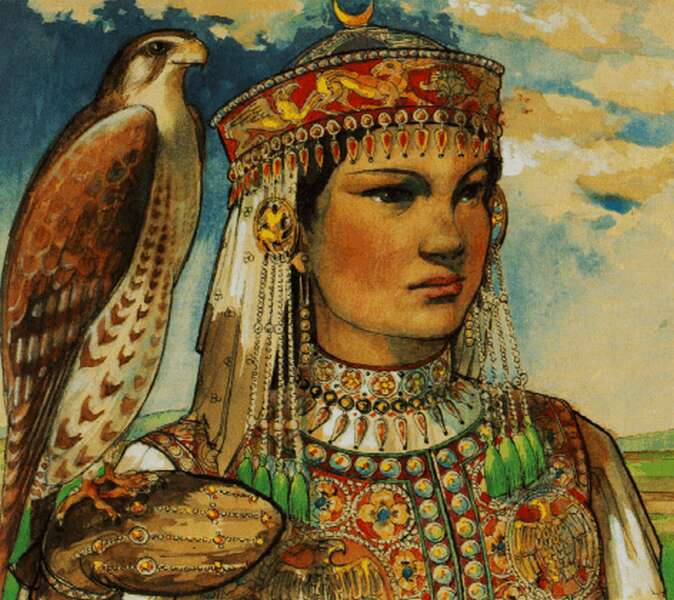
Emese, mother of Álmos

In the 819th year of Our Lord's incarnation, Ügyek, who, as we said above, being of the family of King Magog became a long time later the most noble prince of Scythia, took to wife in Dentumoger the daughter of Duke Eunedubelian, called Emese, from whom he sired a son, who was named Álmos. But he is called Álmos from a divine event, because when she was pregnant a divine vision appeared to his mother in a dream in the form of a falcon that, as if coming to her, impregnated her and made known to her that from her womb a torrent would come forth and from her loins glorious kings be generated, but that they would not increase in their land. Because, therefore, a dream is called "álom" in the Hungarian language and his birth was predicted in a dream, so he was called Álmos. Or he is thus called Álmos, that is holy, because holy kings and dukes were born of his line.

— Anonymus: Gesta Hungarorum

Ügyek's son Előd, fathered a son by the daughter of Eunodubilia in Scythian land, whose name was Álmos, because a bird in the shape of a falcon appeared in his mother's dream when she was pregnant, a rushing stream sprang from her womb, it grew, but not in its own land, and from this it was prophesied that glorious kings would come from her loins. Because dream is "álom" in our language, and the birth of that boy was prophesied by a dream, that's why he was called Álmos.

— Mark of Kalt: Chronicon Pictum

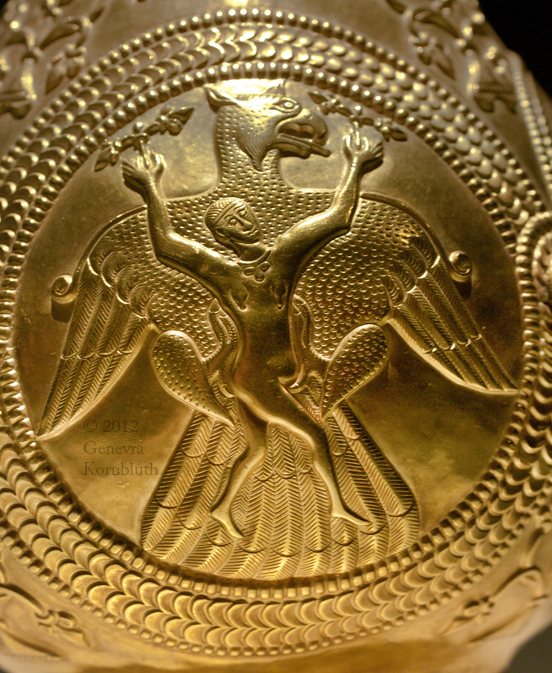
Illustration on the Treasure of Nagyszentmiklós depicting Álmos legend from the Hungarian mythology: Dream of Emese with the Turul bird. Avar gold treasure from the 7-9th century, it was found in 1799 in Nagyszentmiklós, Kingdom of Hungary (now Sânnicolau Mare, Romania). It locates today at the Kunsthistorisches Museum in Vienna.

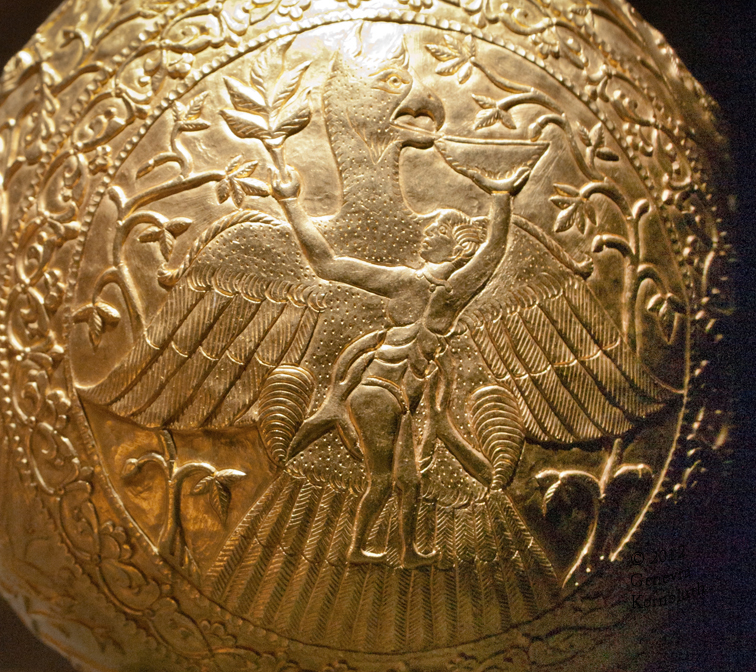
Similar Turul depiction on another gold item of the Treasure of Nagyszentmiklós

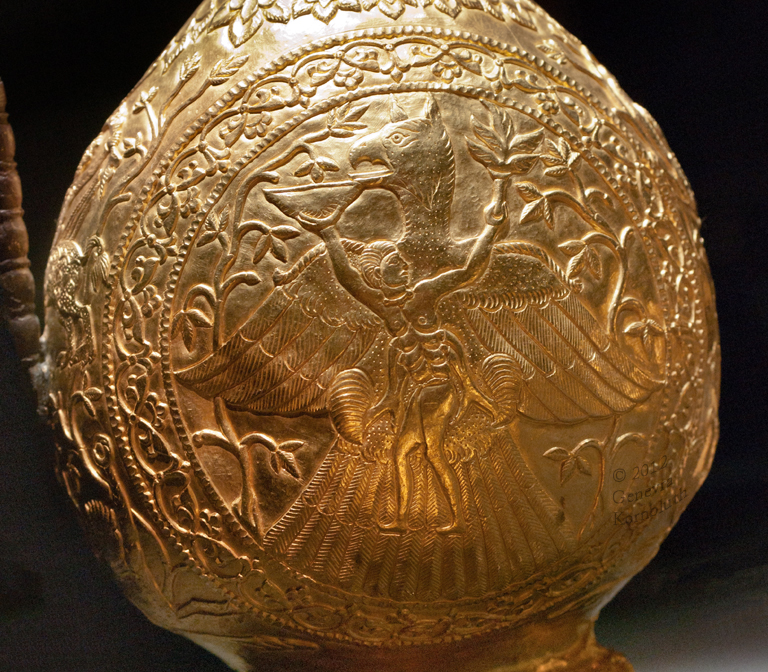
Similar Turul depiction on another gold item of the Treasure of Nagyszentmiklós

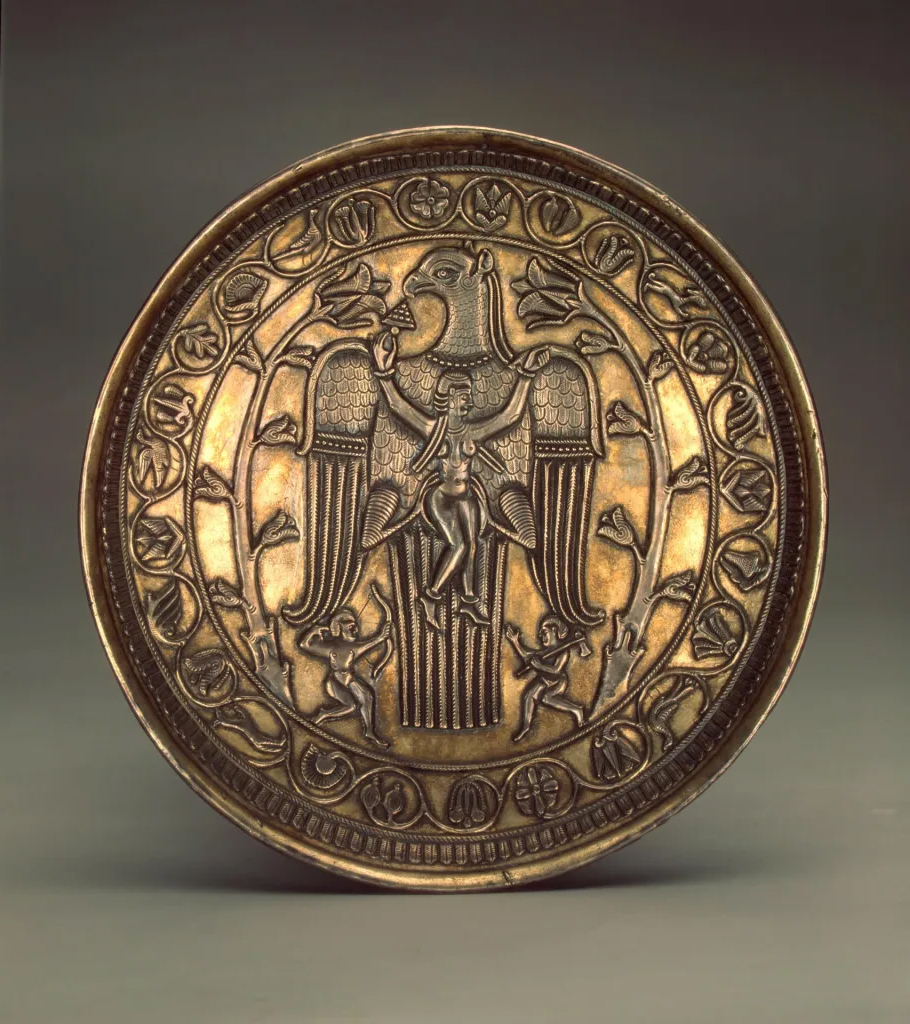
A similar scene on a Sassanid silver plate from the 7th century; decorated with an eagle carrying a woman, the plate was found in Cherdynsky District in the Soviet Union in 1934, now in the Hermitage Museum in Saint Petersburg.

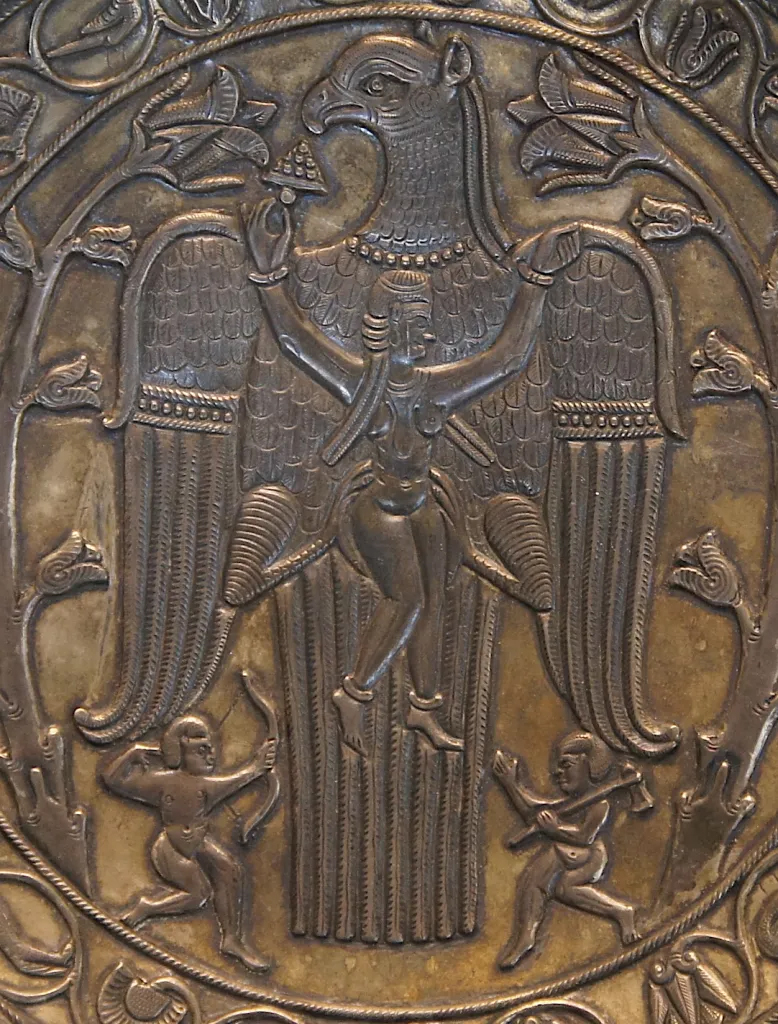
Close up scene of the Sassanid silver plate

According to the Gesta Hunnorum et Hungarorum, King Attila had the Turul bird on his shield and it was the military badge of the Hungarians until the time of Prince Géza.

King Attila's coat of arms, which he used on his own shield, depicted a bird with a crown, which is called "Turul" in Hungarian. This coat of arms was carried by the Hungarians in the wars of the communities as long as the communities governed themselves, until the time of Prince Géza, the son of Taksony.

— Simon of Kéza: Gesta Hunnorum et Hungarorum

King Attila himself was feared by his own subjects because of his innate strictness and gloomy look, but he behaved with a noble spirit towards the peoples subject to him. As a military insignia, a crowned falcon was painted on both his shield and his flag. This military badge was worn by the Huns, namely the Hungarians, until the time of the son of Prince Taksony, Prince Géza. His title was like this: Attila son of Bendegúz, grandson of the great Nimrod who was raised in Engaddi, by the grace of God, King of the Huns, Medes, Goths and Danes, the Fear of the World, the Scourge of God.

— Johannes Thuróczy: Chronica Hungarorum

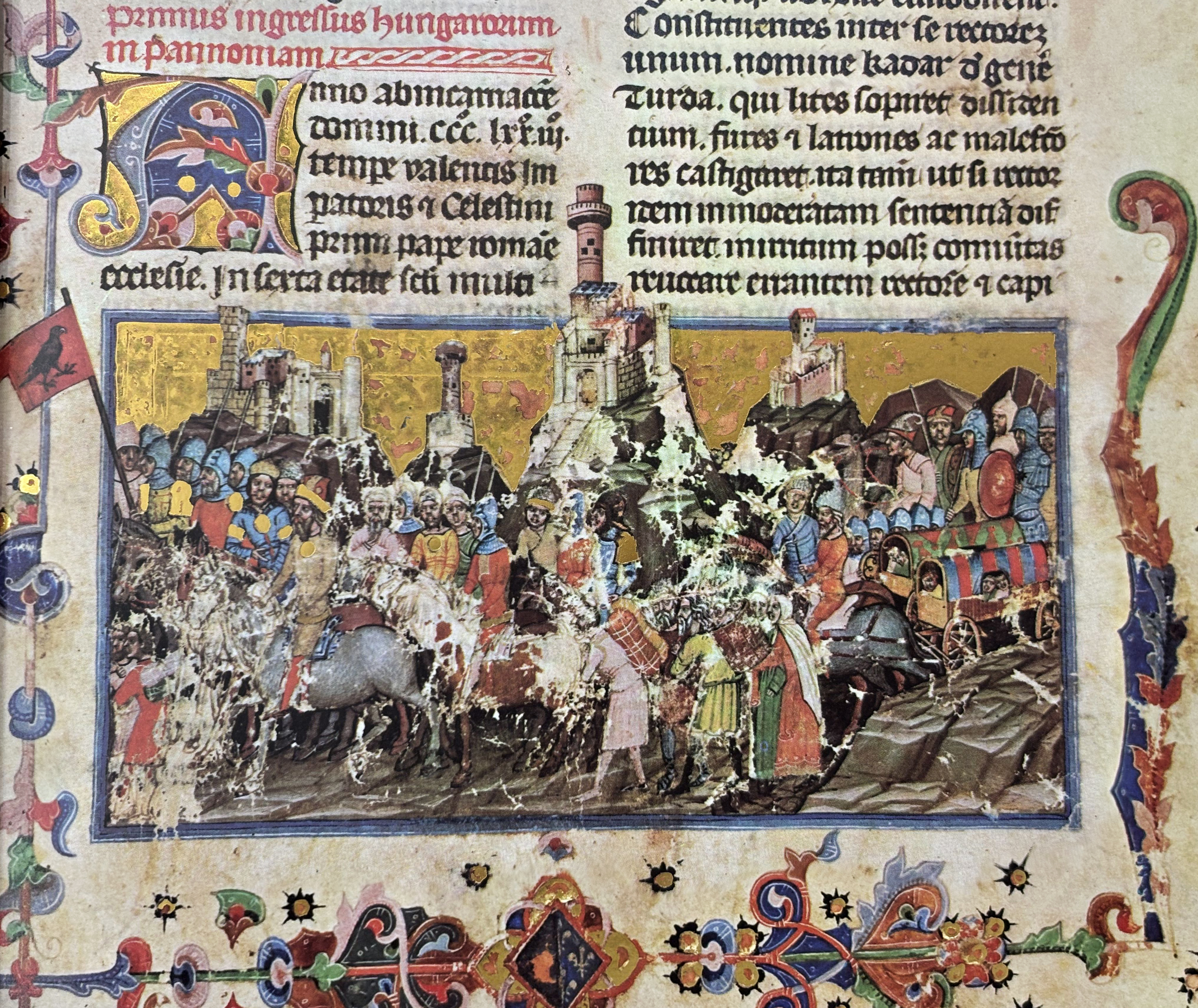
The Huns, considered by the chronicle to be the ancestors of the Hungarians arrive in Pannonia from Scythia at the first time, a Turul flag protruding from the frame of the picture (Chronicon Pictum, 1358)

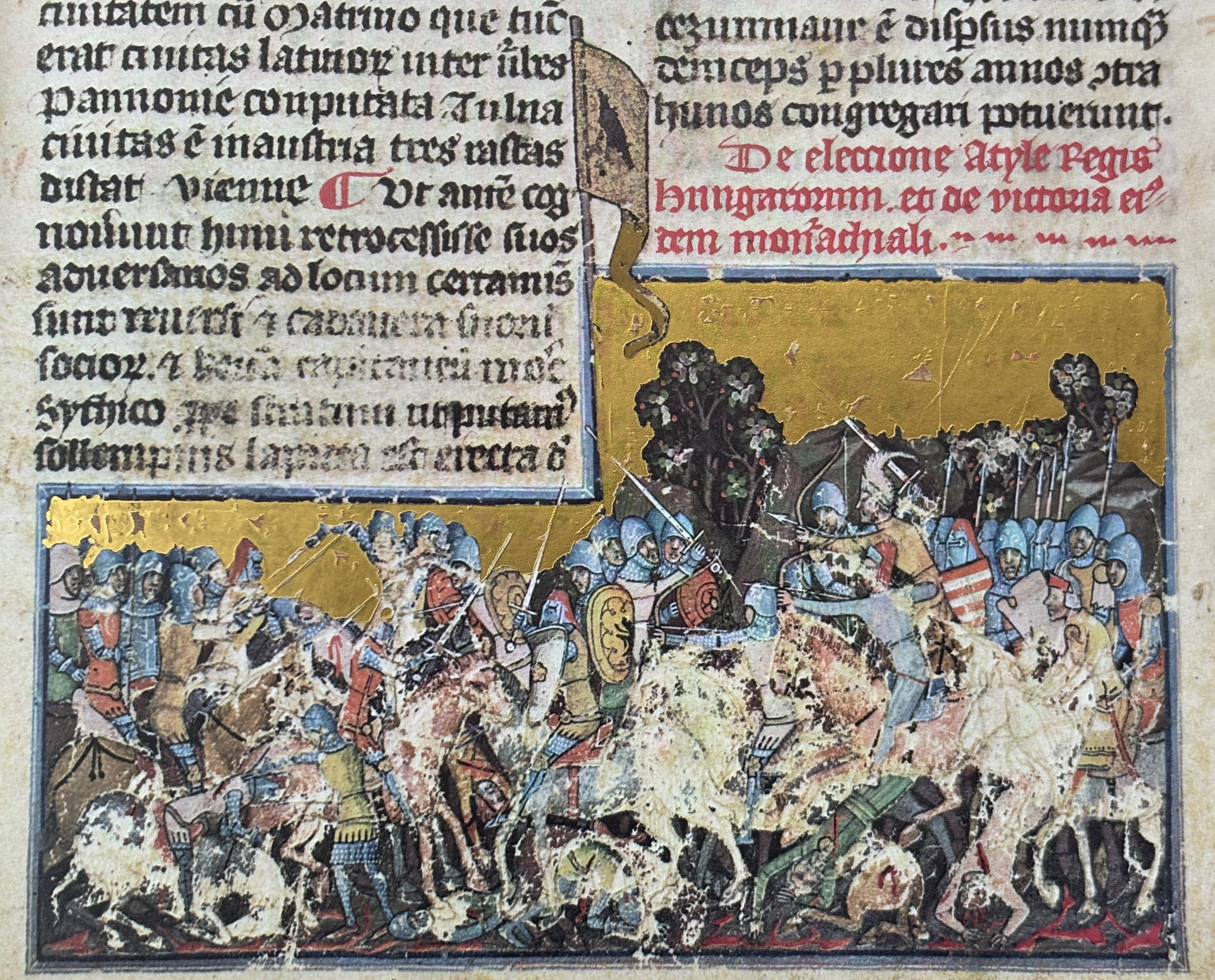
Attila's battle with the Romans at Zeiselmauer, a golden flag decorated with a Turul stands out from the picture (Chronicon Pictum, 1358)

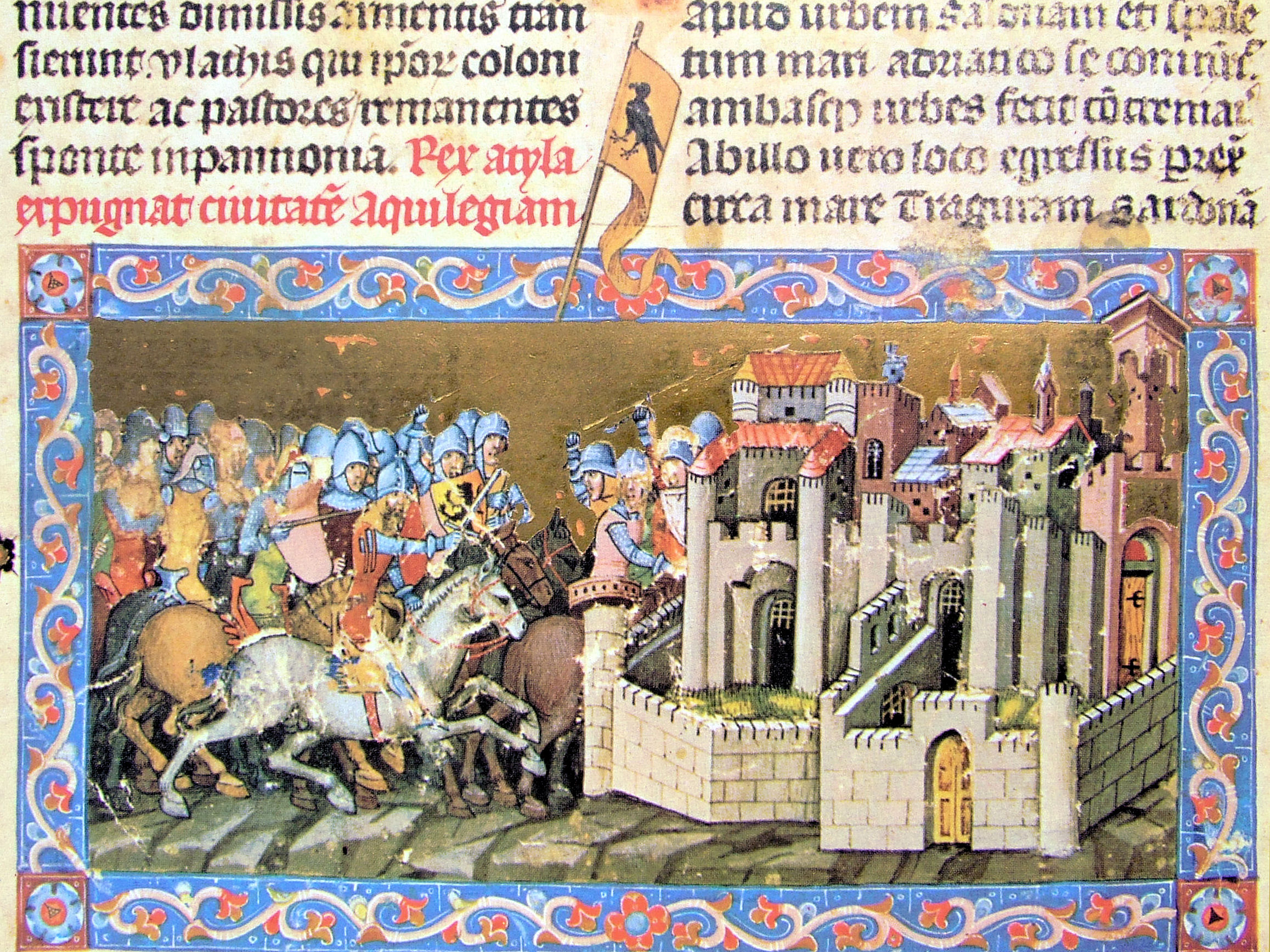
The Huns led by Attila are besieging Aquileia, one Hun warrior carries a Turul flag (Chronicon Pictum, 1358)

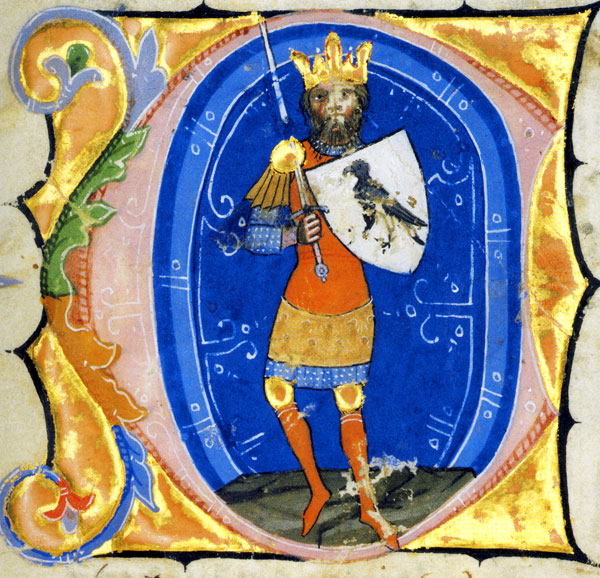
King Attila, the Turul bird in his shield (Chronicon Pictum, 1358)

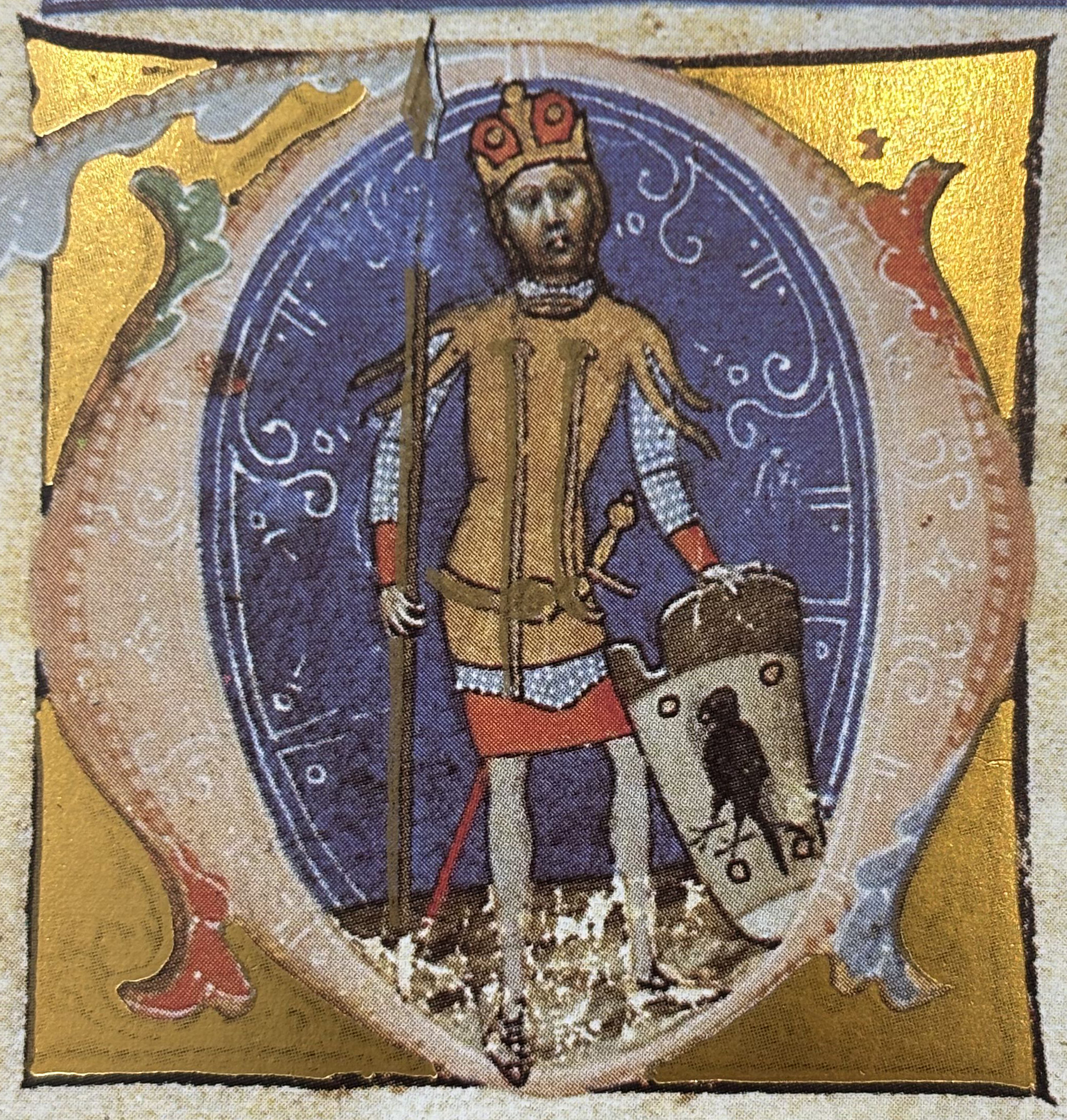
Előd, one of the seven chieftains of the Hungarians relies on a Turul shield (Chronicon Pictum, 1358)

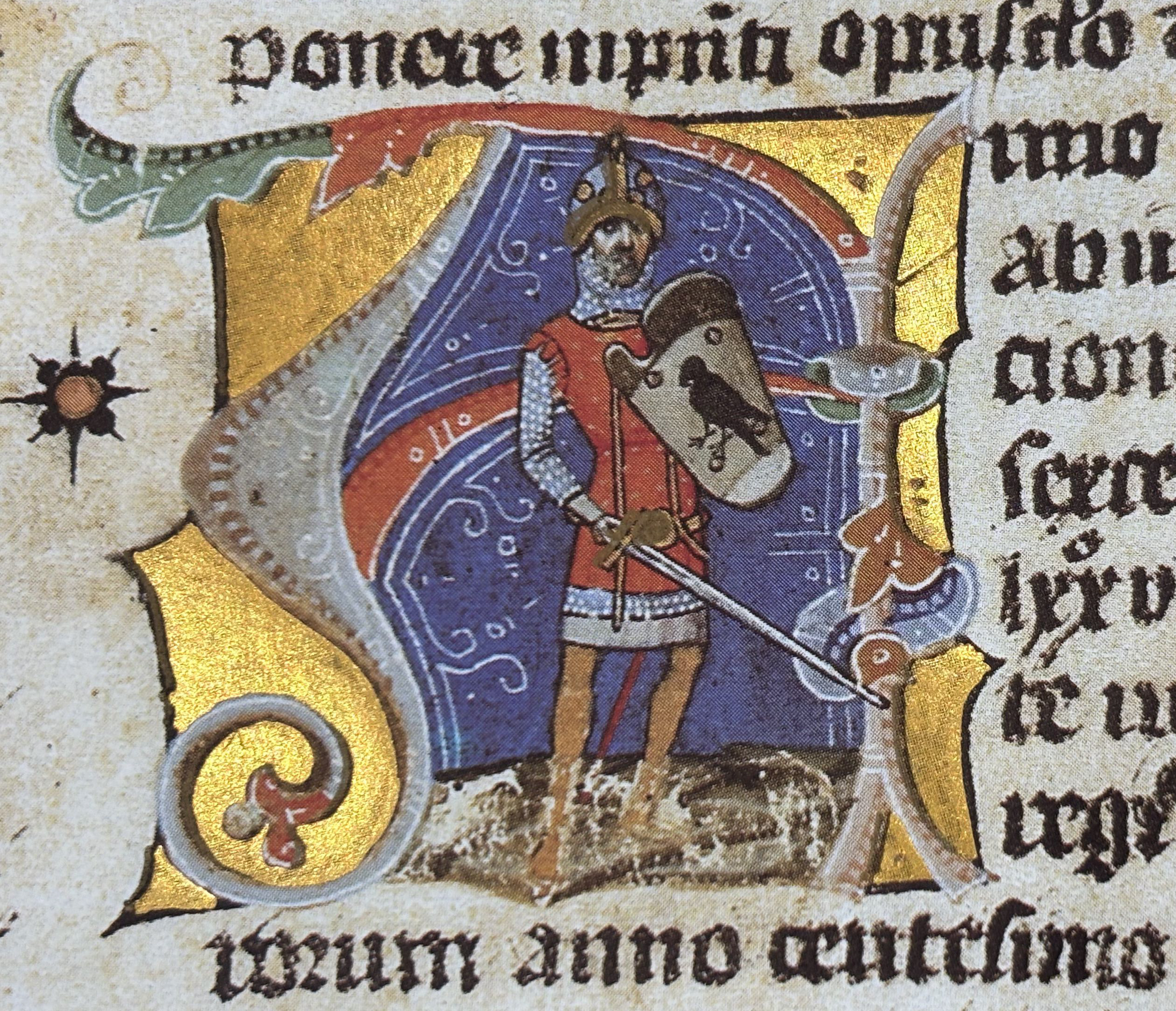
Álmos, Grand Prince of the Hungarians holds a Turul shield in his hand (Chronicon Pictum, 1358)

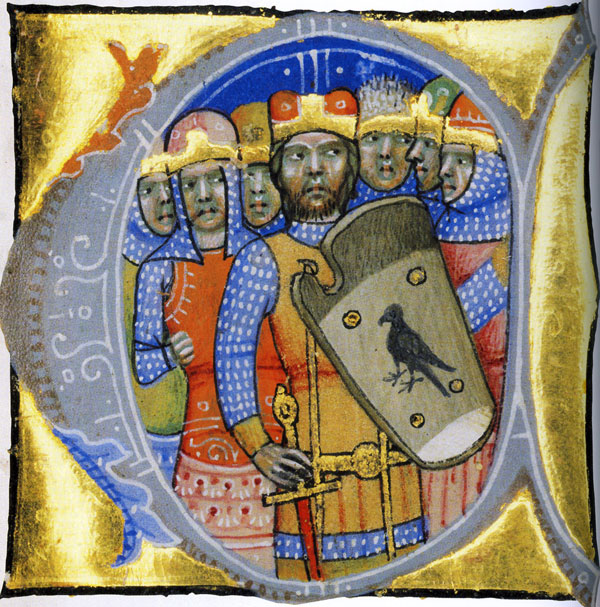
The seven chieftains of the Hungarians, Árpád, Grand Prince of the Hungarians is in the middle with a Turul shield (Chronicon Pictum, 1358)

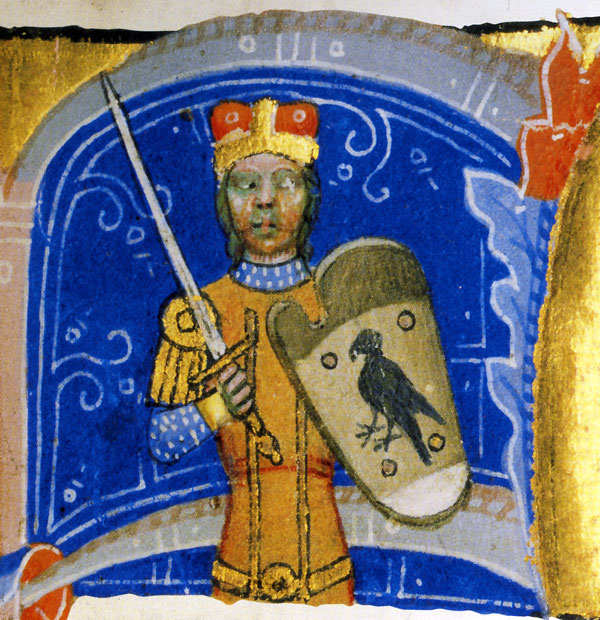
Árpád, Grand Prince of the Hungarians stands with a Turul shield (Chronicon Pictum, 1358)

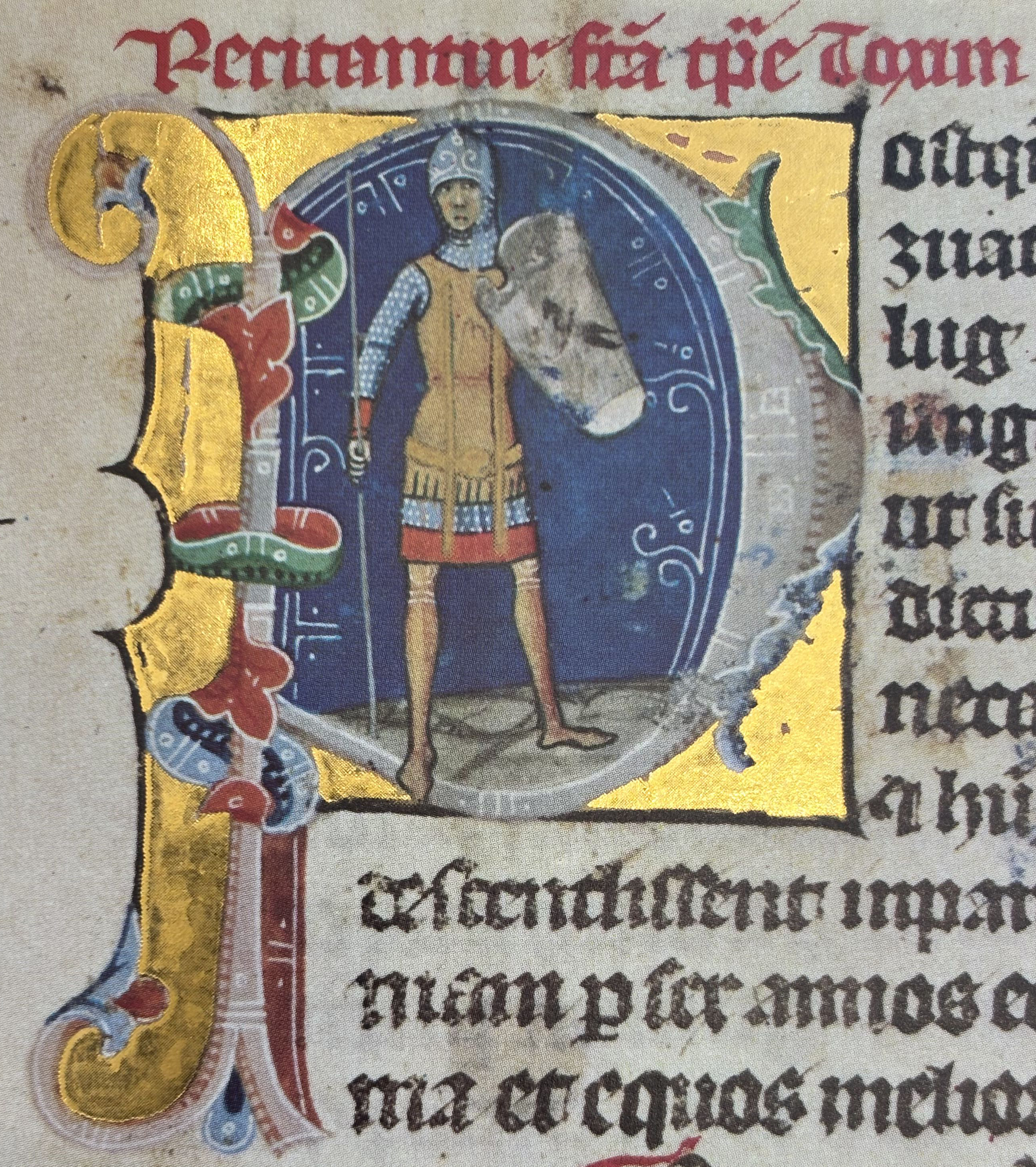
Grand Prince Taksony, a Turul bird is on his shield (Chronicon Pictum, 1358)

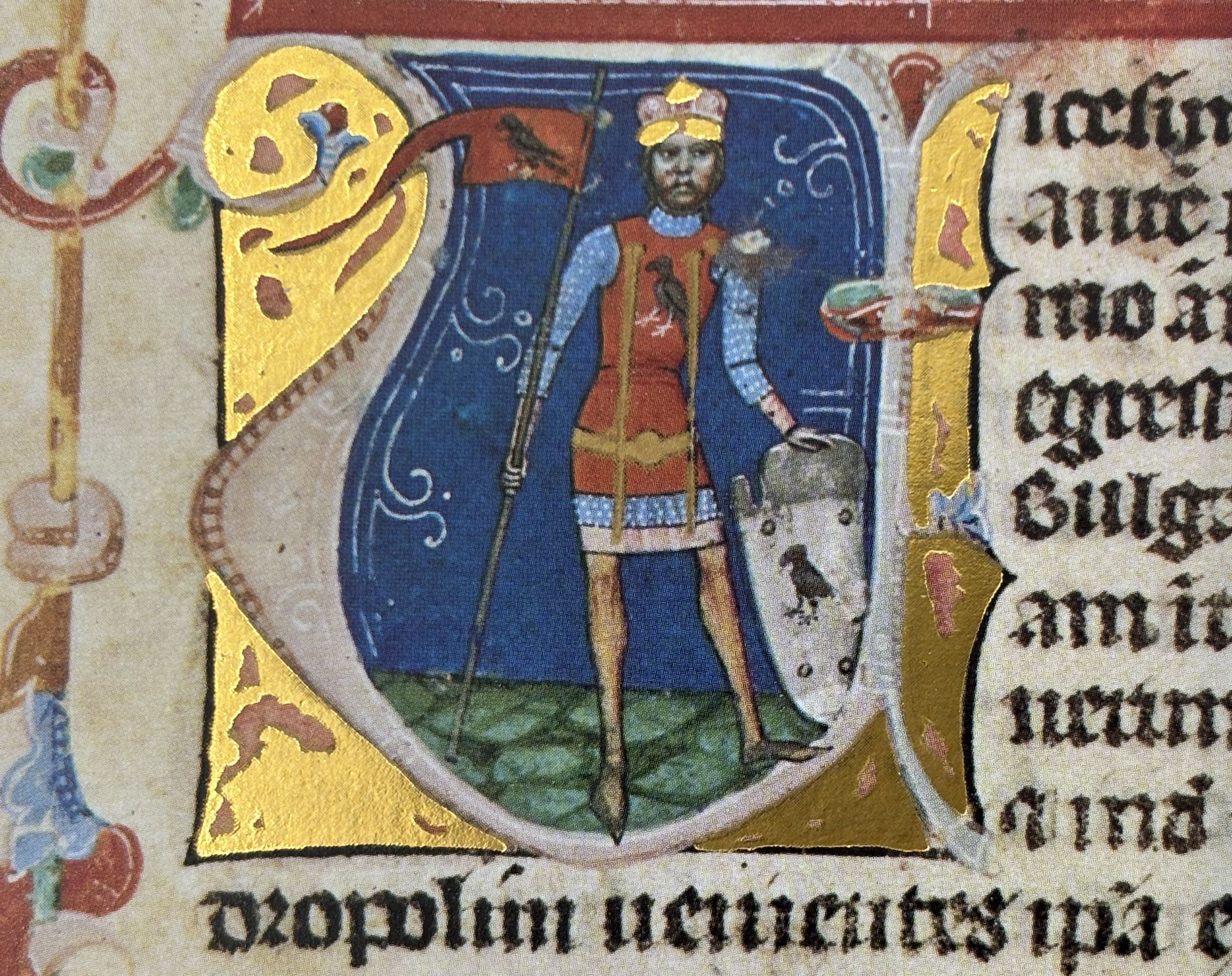
Captain Apor, the leader of the Hungarian army wears a Turul bird as a crest on his flag, shield and chest (Chronicon Pictum, 1358)

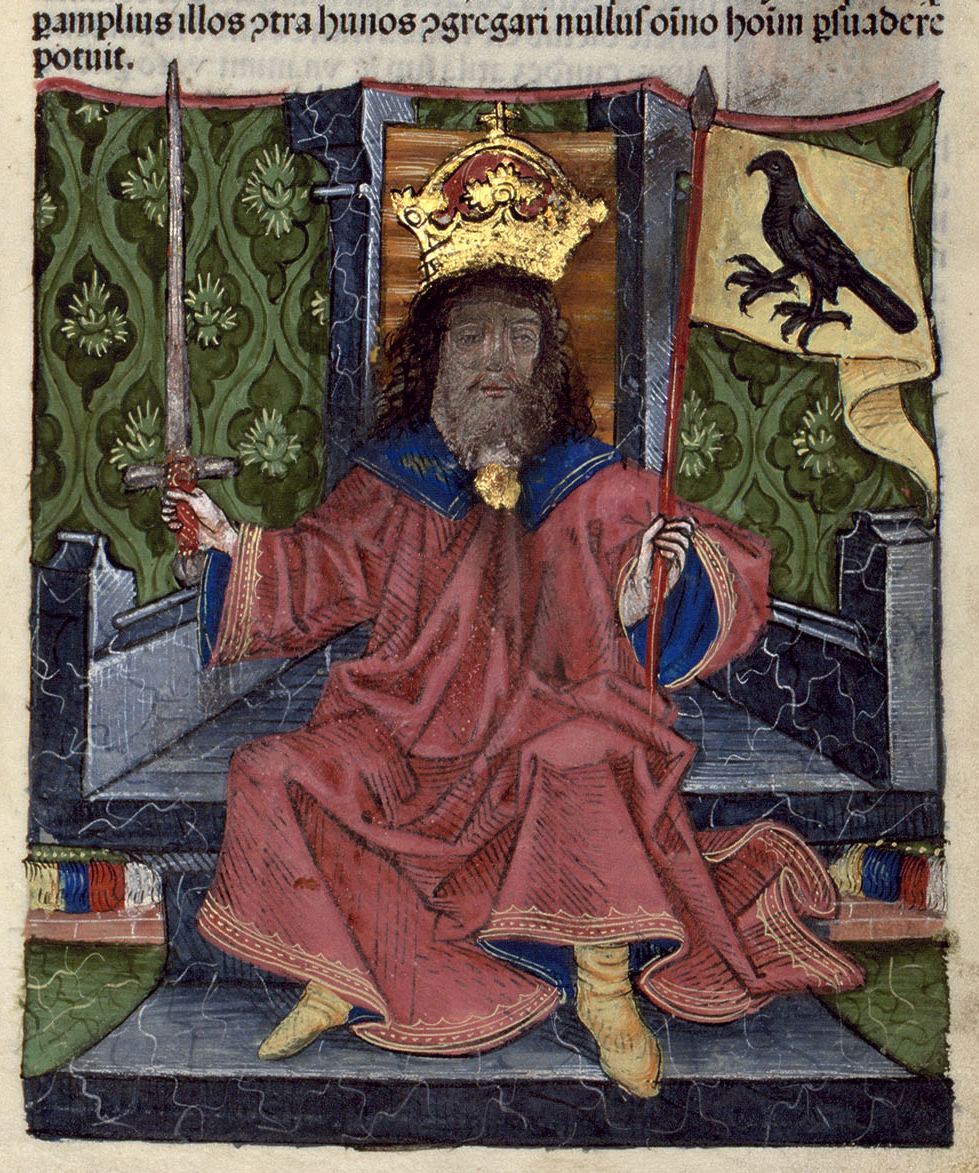
King Attila, his flag depicts the Turul bird (Chronica Hungarorum, 1488)

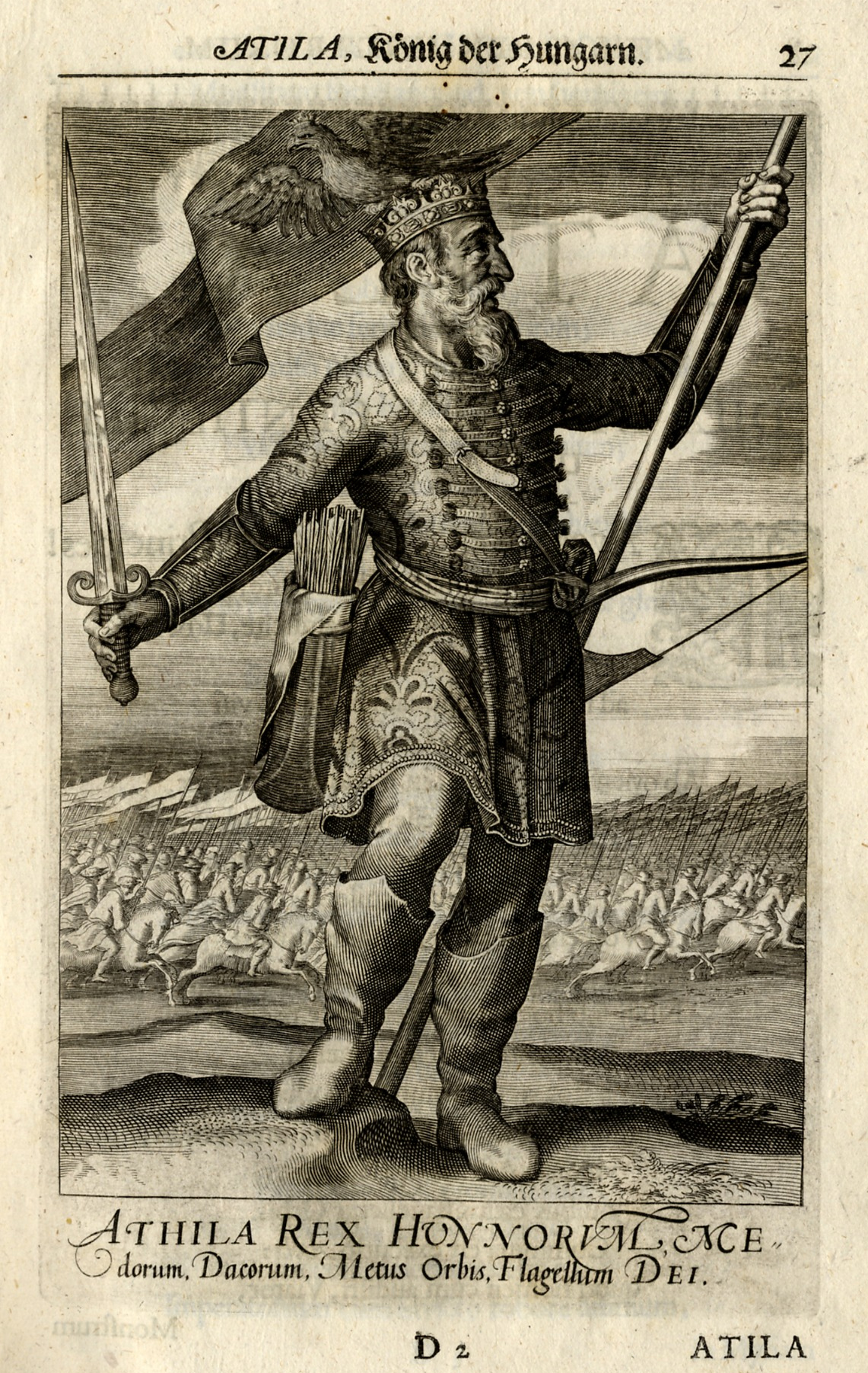
King Attila of the Huns, his flag depicts the Turul bird (Nádasdy Mausoleum, 1664)

== Modern use ==
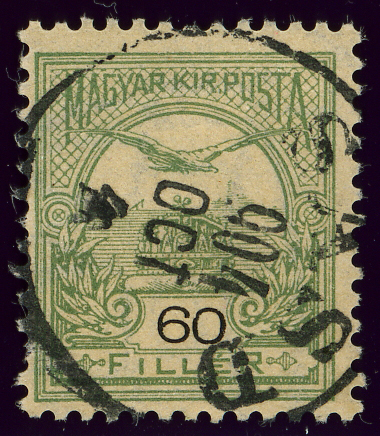
Kingdom of Hungary first issue (1900) with image of Turul

The Turul is used as in the design of coats of arms of the Hungarian Defence Forces, the Counter Terrorism Centre and the Office of National Security. The central element of the emblem of the Hungarian Defence Forces is the Turul bird with extended wings holding the sword of King Saint Stephen in its claws.

There were three large Turul statues, each with a wingspan of 15 metres (49 ft), in Kingdom of Hungary (before the country had its borders reconfigured by the Treaty of Trianon). The last of the three stands on a mountain near Tatabánya, Hungary, but the other two were destroyed. It is the largest bird statue in Europe, and the largest bronze statue in Central Europe. There remain at least 195 Turul statues in Hungary, as well as 48 in Romania (32 in Transylvania and 16 in Partium), 8 in Slovakia, 7 in Serbia, 5 in Ukraine, 1 in Austria and 1 in Croatia. One of the most recently erected, as of 29 September 2012, on St Michael the Archangel's Day, is in Hungary's Ópusztaszer National Heritage Park.

Some of the Kingdom of Hungary postage stamps issued after 1900 feature the Turul.

Emblem and flag of the Hungarian Defence Forces

Logo of the Counter Terrorism Centre

Logo of the Constitution Protection Office

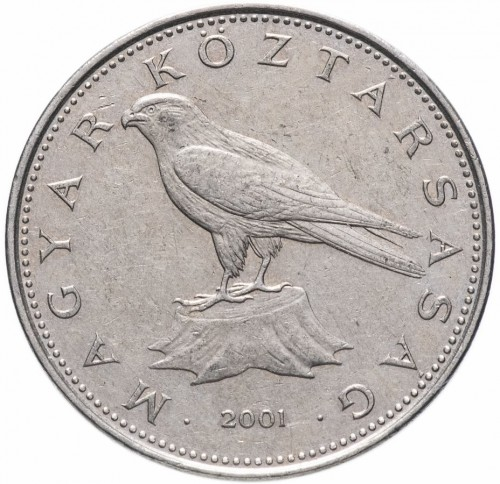
Coin of 50 forint in Hungary, depicted with saker falcon, several authors identify the Turul with saker falcon

Flag of Banate of Leitha (1921)

== Gallery ==
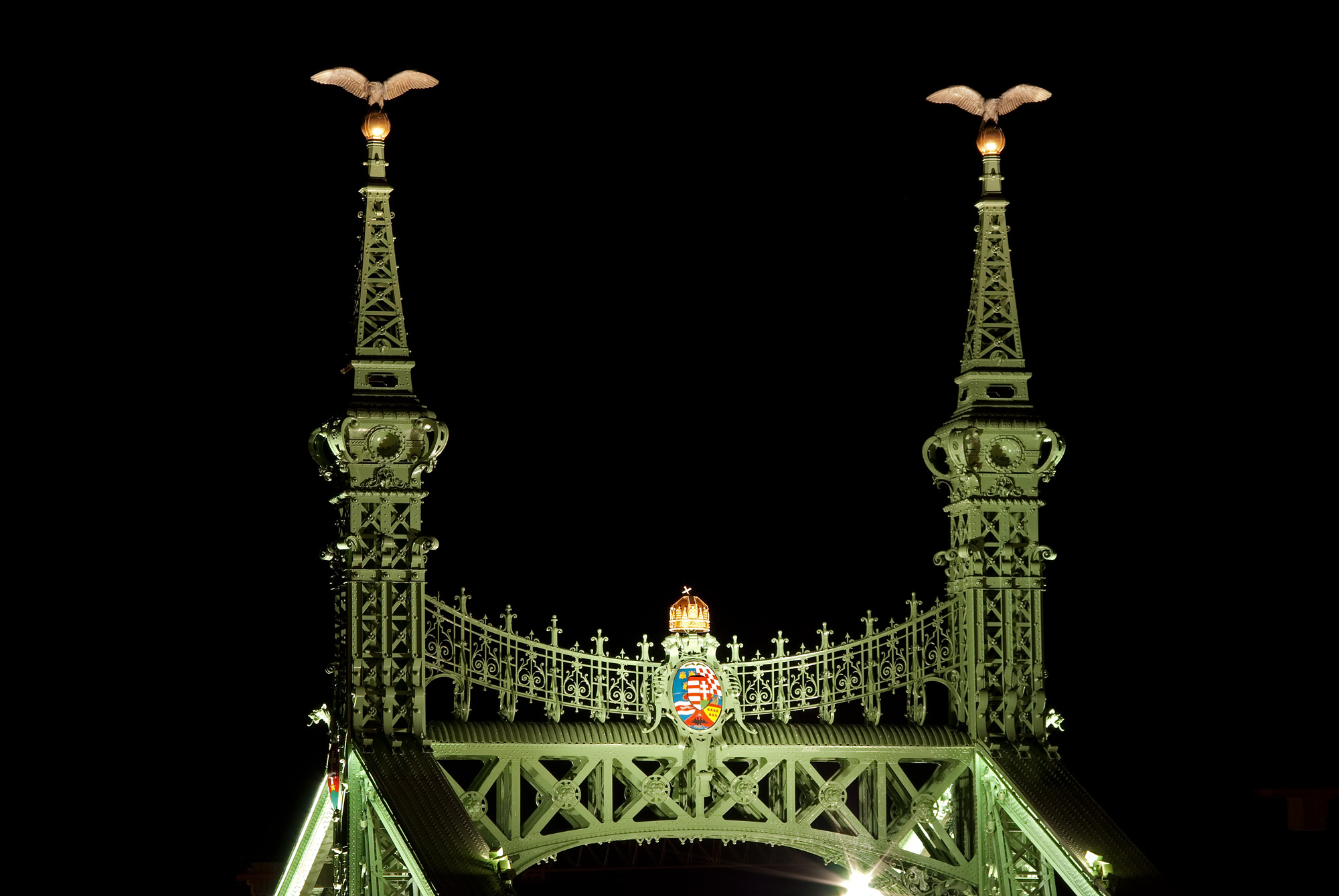
Turul birds on the pillars of Liberty Bridge, Budapest, Hungary (1896)

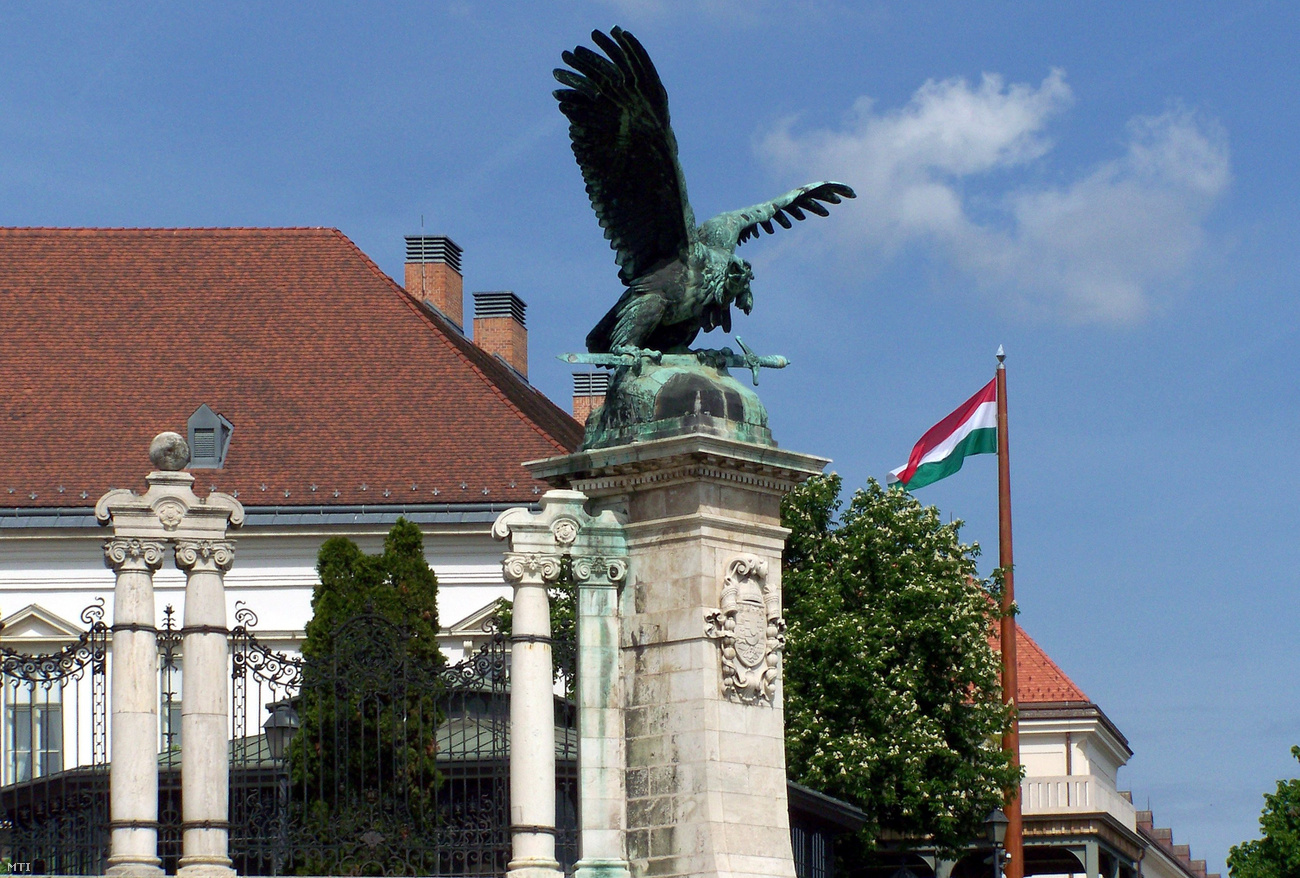
Turul bird on the northeast corner of the Royal Castle in Budapest, Hungary, the height of the statue is 6 m (made by Gyula Donáth in 1903)

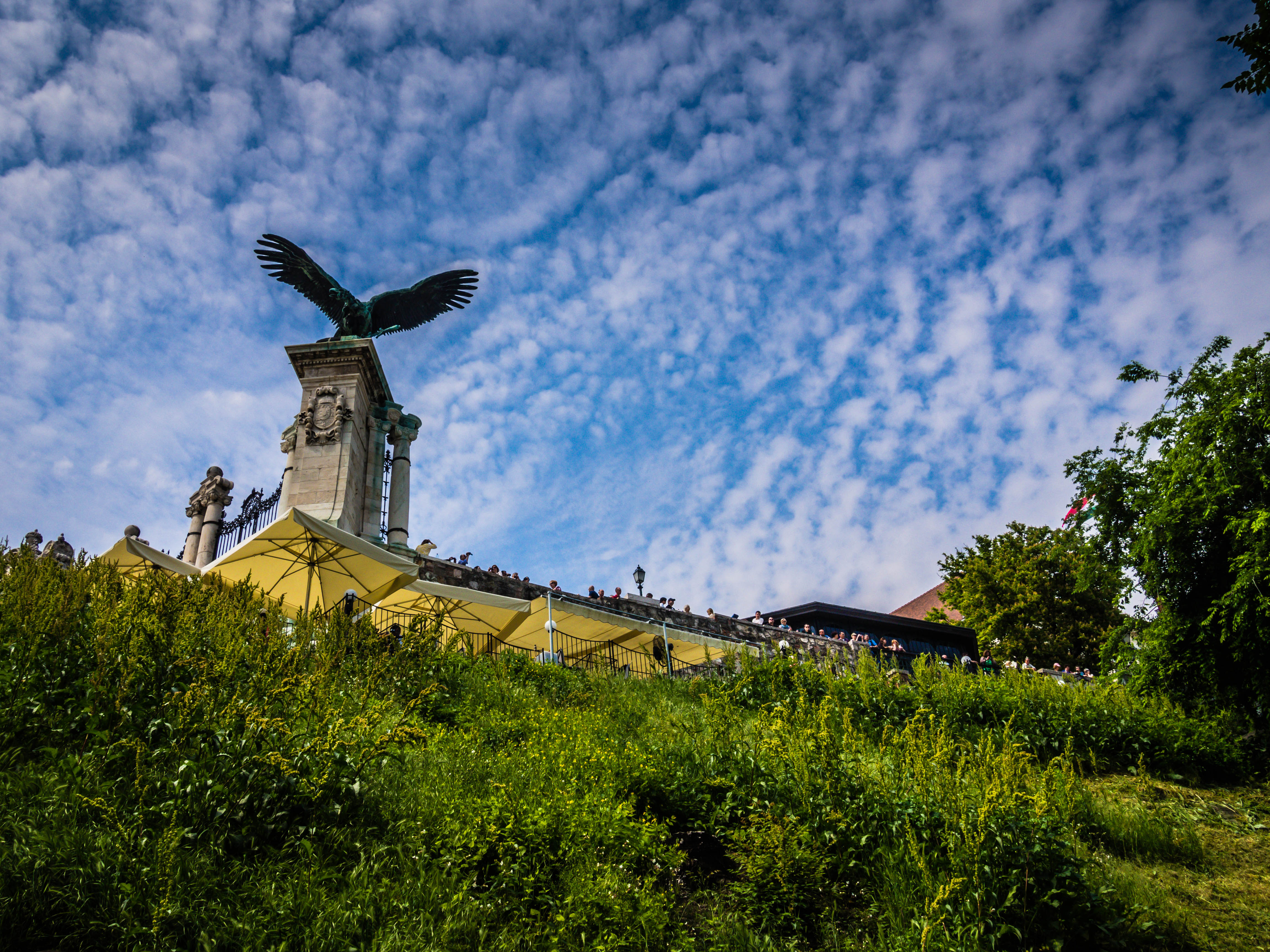
Turul bird on the northeast corner of the Royal Castle in Budapest, Hungary, (made by Gyula Donáth in 1903)

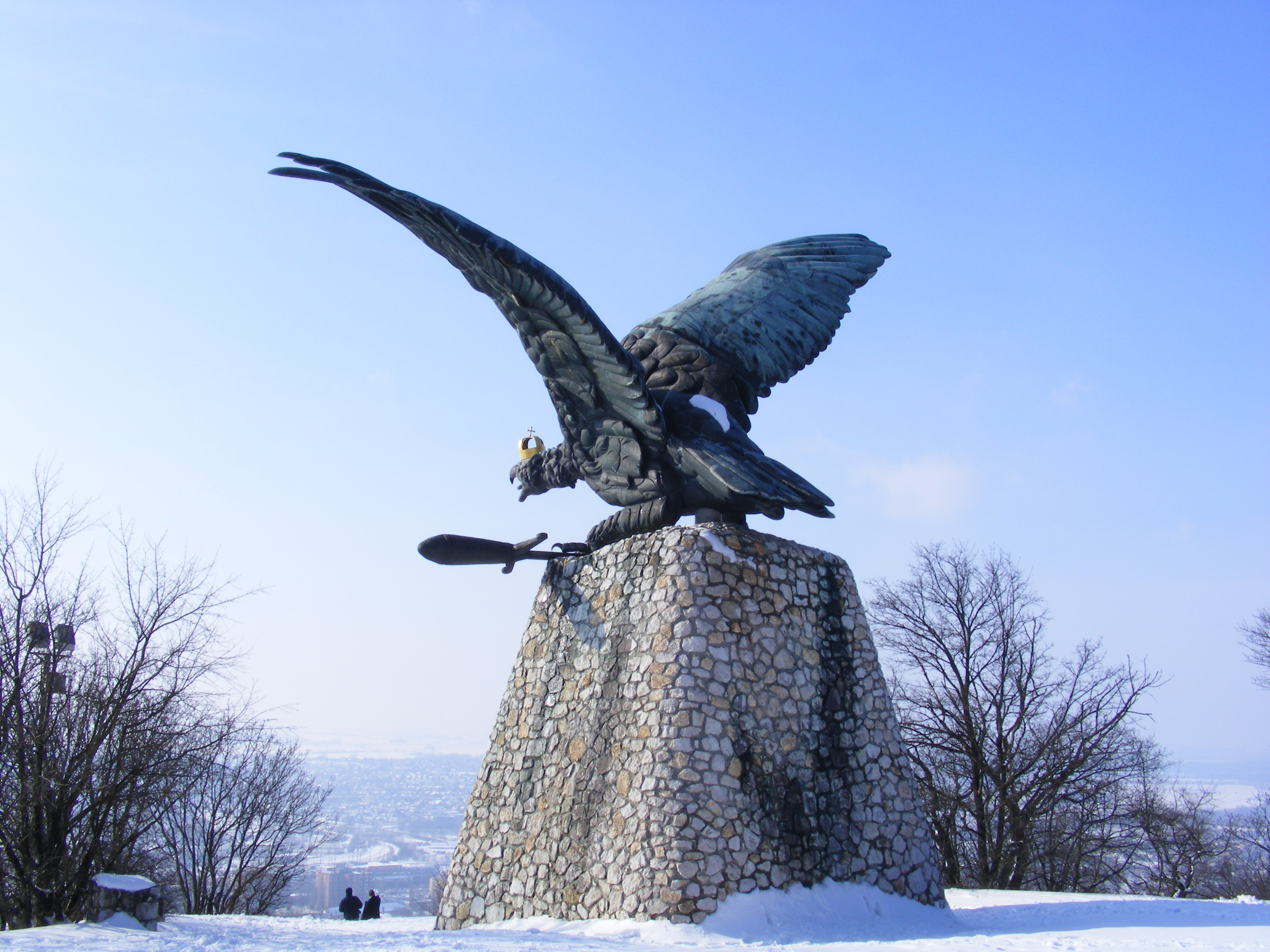
Crown headed Turul bird, Bánhida (Tatabánya), Hungary, the largest bird statue in Europe (made by Gyula Donáth in 1907)

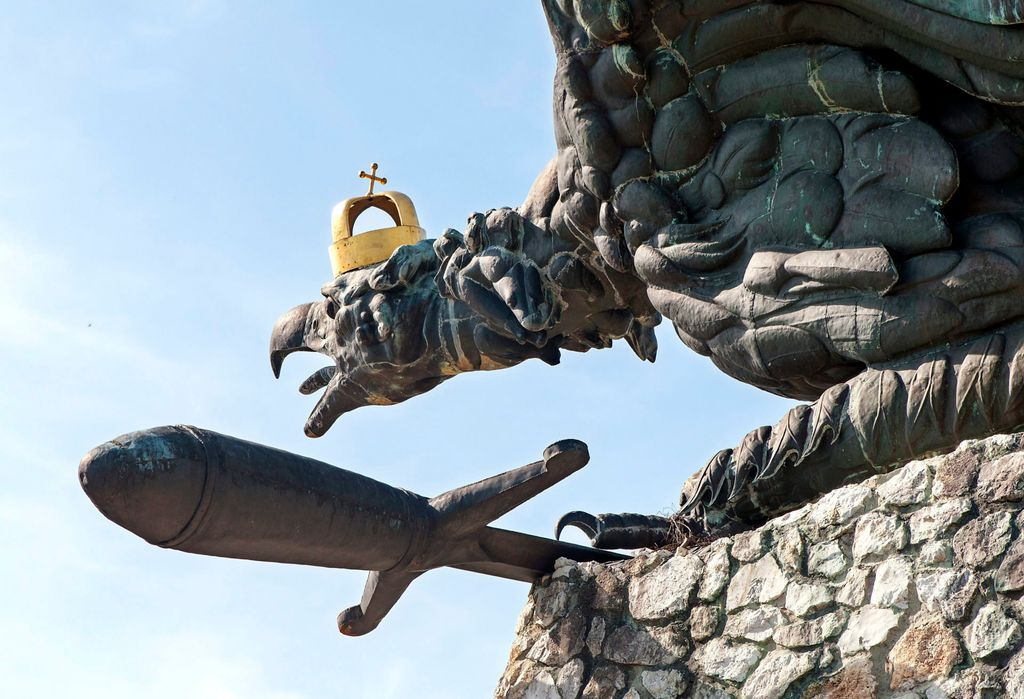
Crown headed Turul bird, Bánhida (Tatabánya), Hungary, the largest bird statue in Europe (made by Gyula Donáth in 1907)

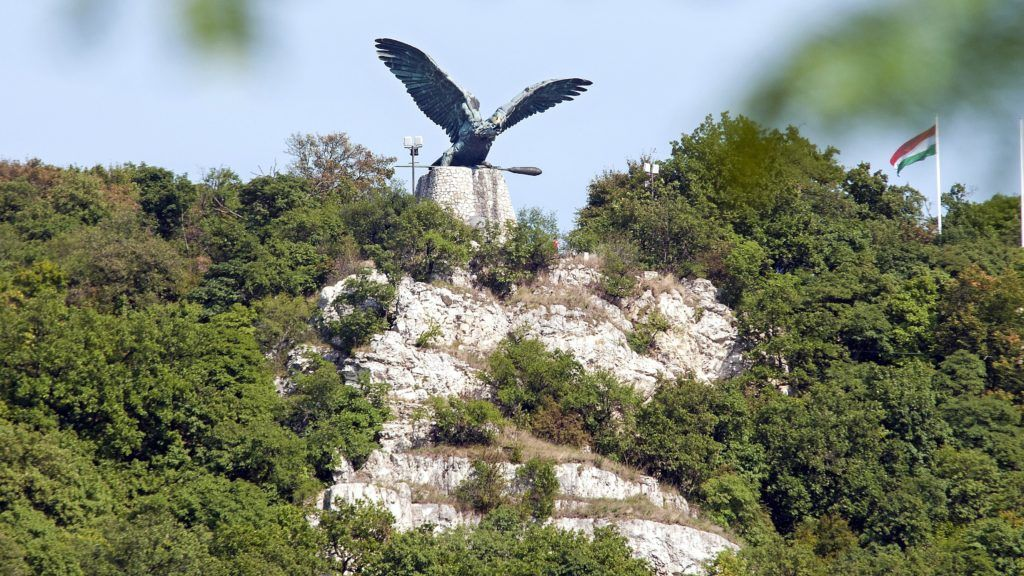
Crown headed Turul bird, Bánhida (Tatabánya), Hungary, the largest bird statue in Europe (made by Gyula Donáth in 1907)

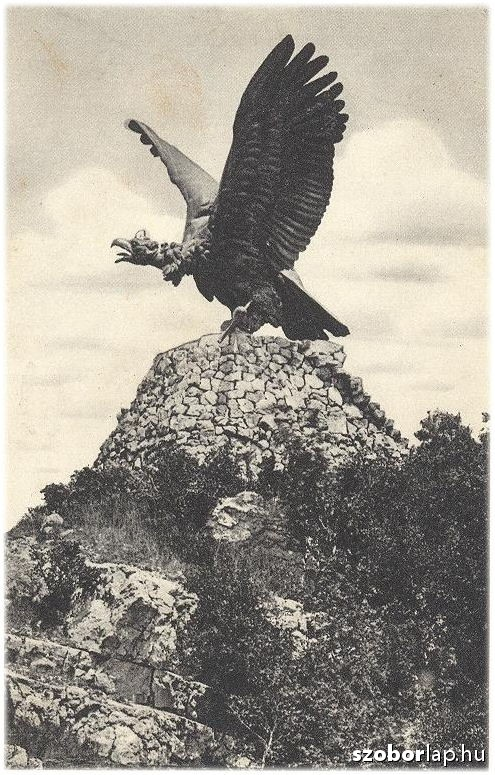
Crown headed Turul bird, Bánhida (Tatabánya), Hungary, the largest bird statue in Europe (made by Gyula Donáth in 1907)

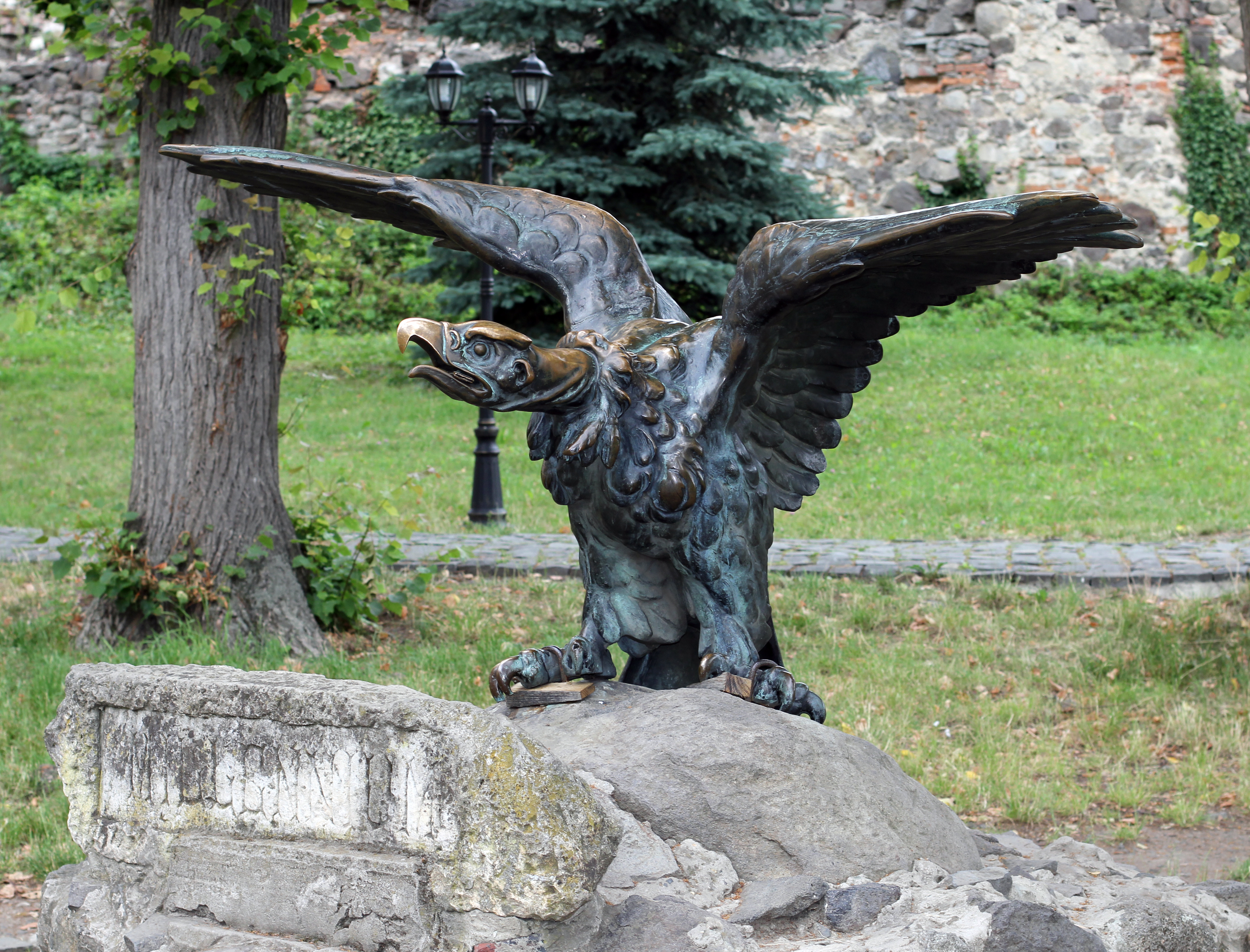
Turul in the Ungvár (now Uzhhorod) Castle, Transcarpathia, Ukraine

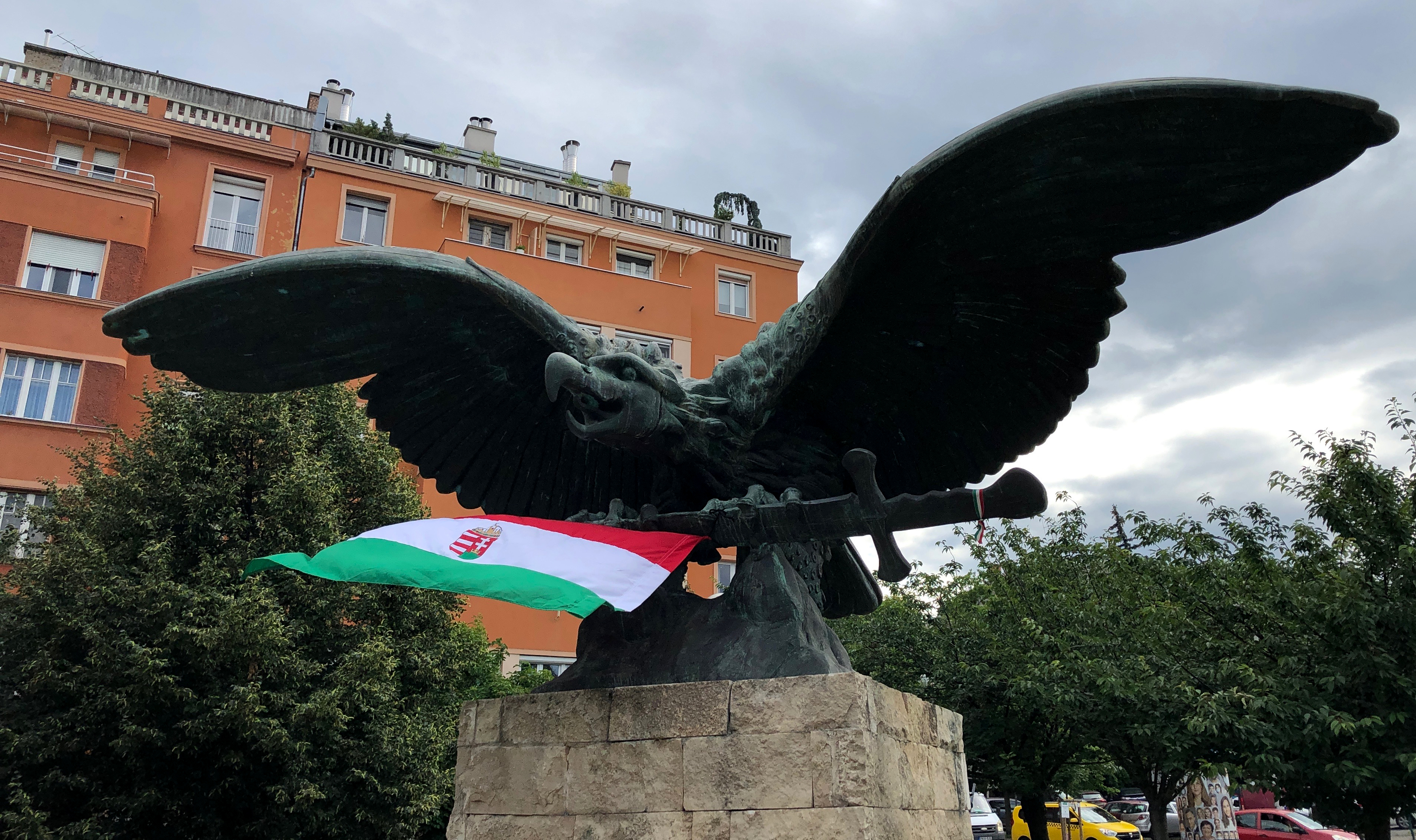
Turul statue in the 12th District of Budapest, Hungary (2005)

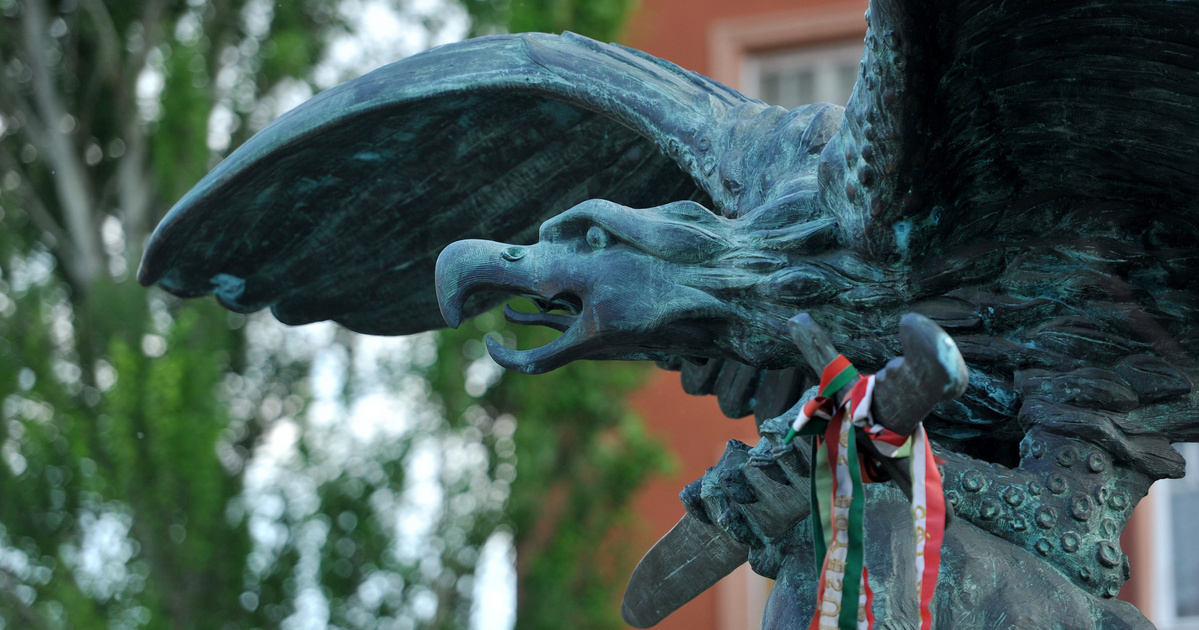
Turul statue in the 12th District of Budapest, Hungary (2005)

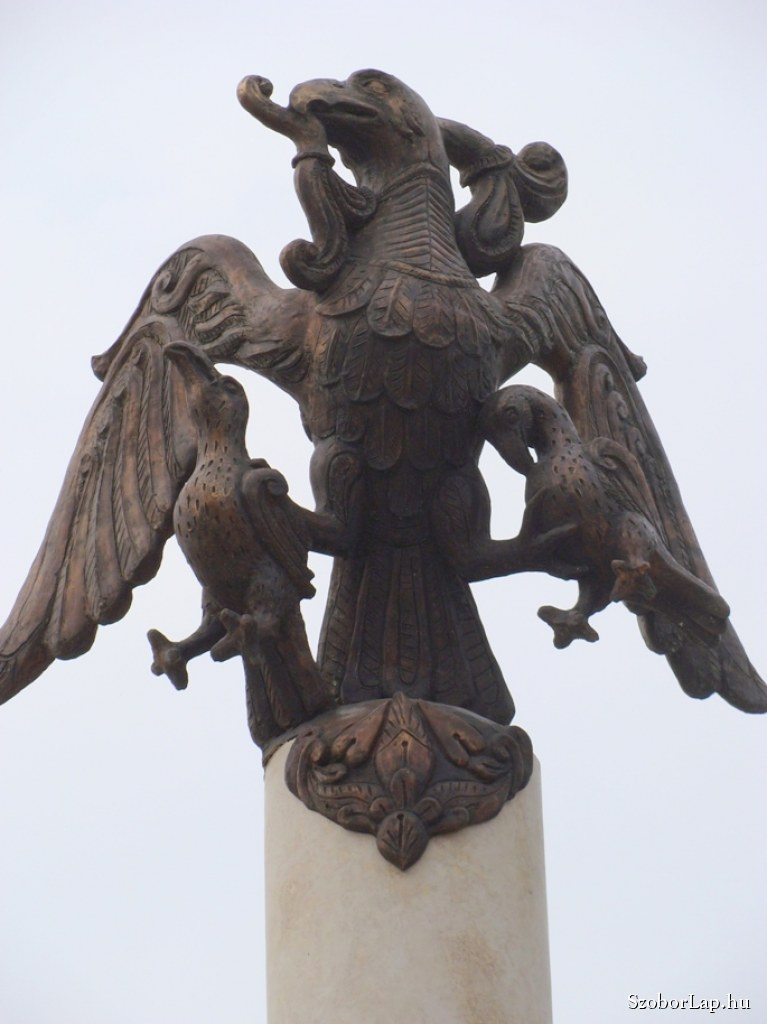
Turul statue in Rakamaz, Hungary (2009)

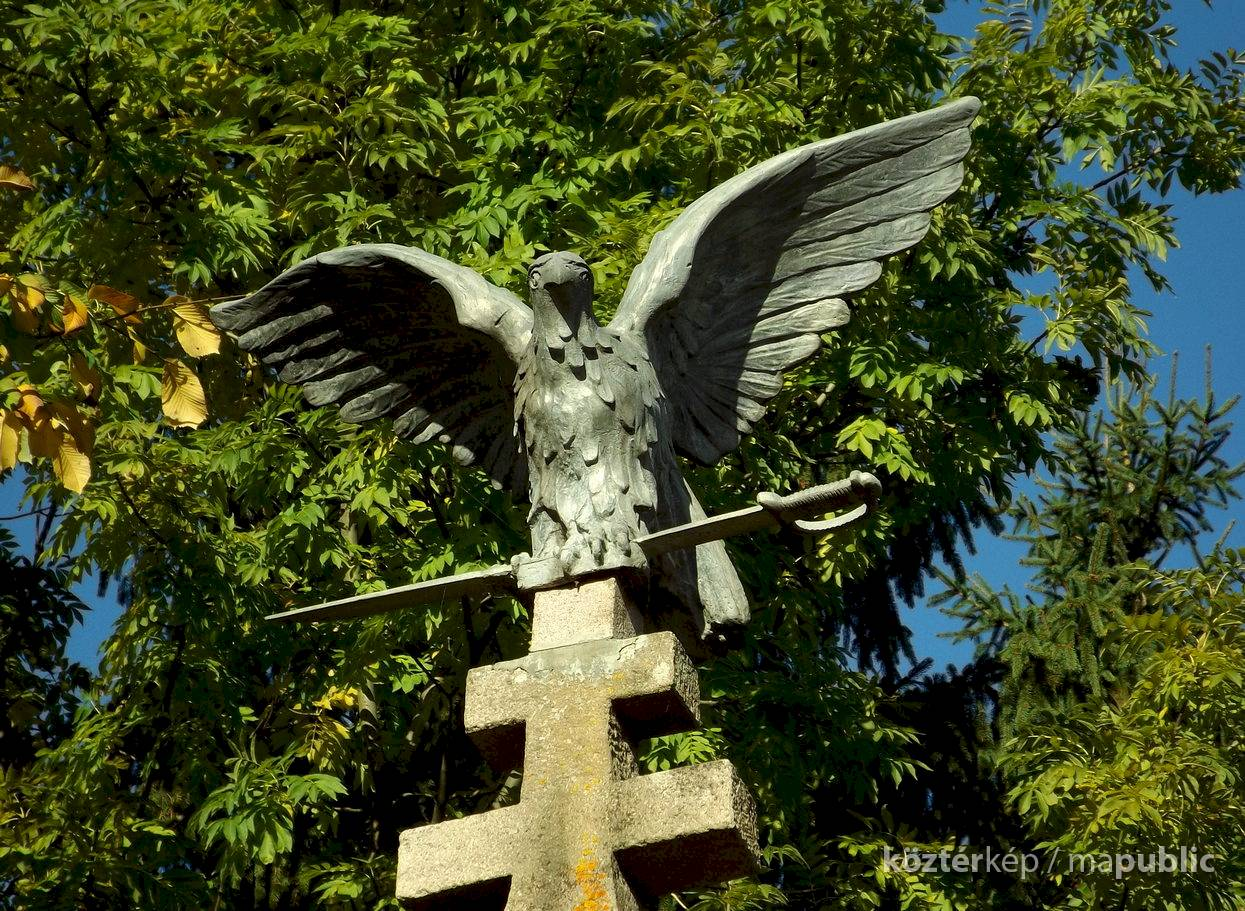
Turul statue on war memorial, Csíkszentmárton (now Sânmartin), Transylvania, Romania (1941)

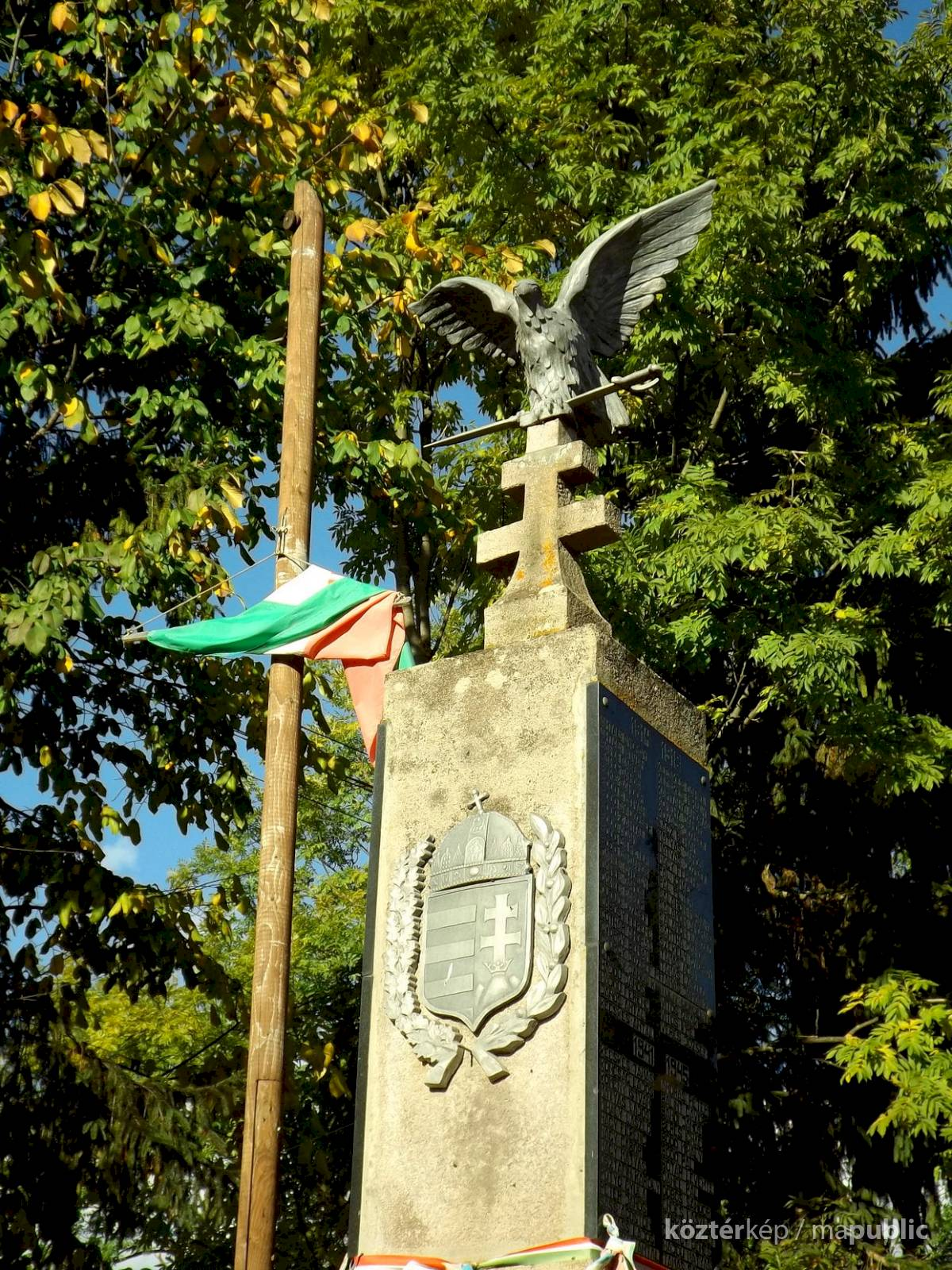
Turul statue on war memorial, Csíkszentmárton (now Sânmartin), Transylvania, Romania (1941)

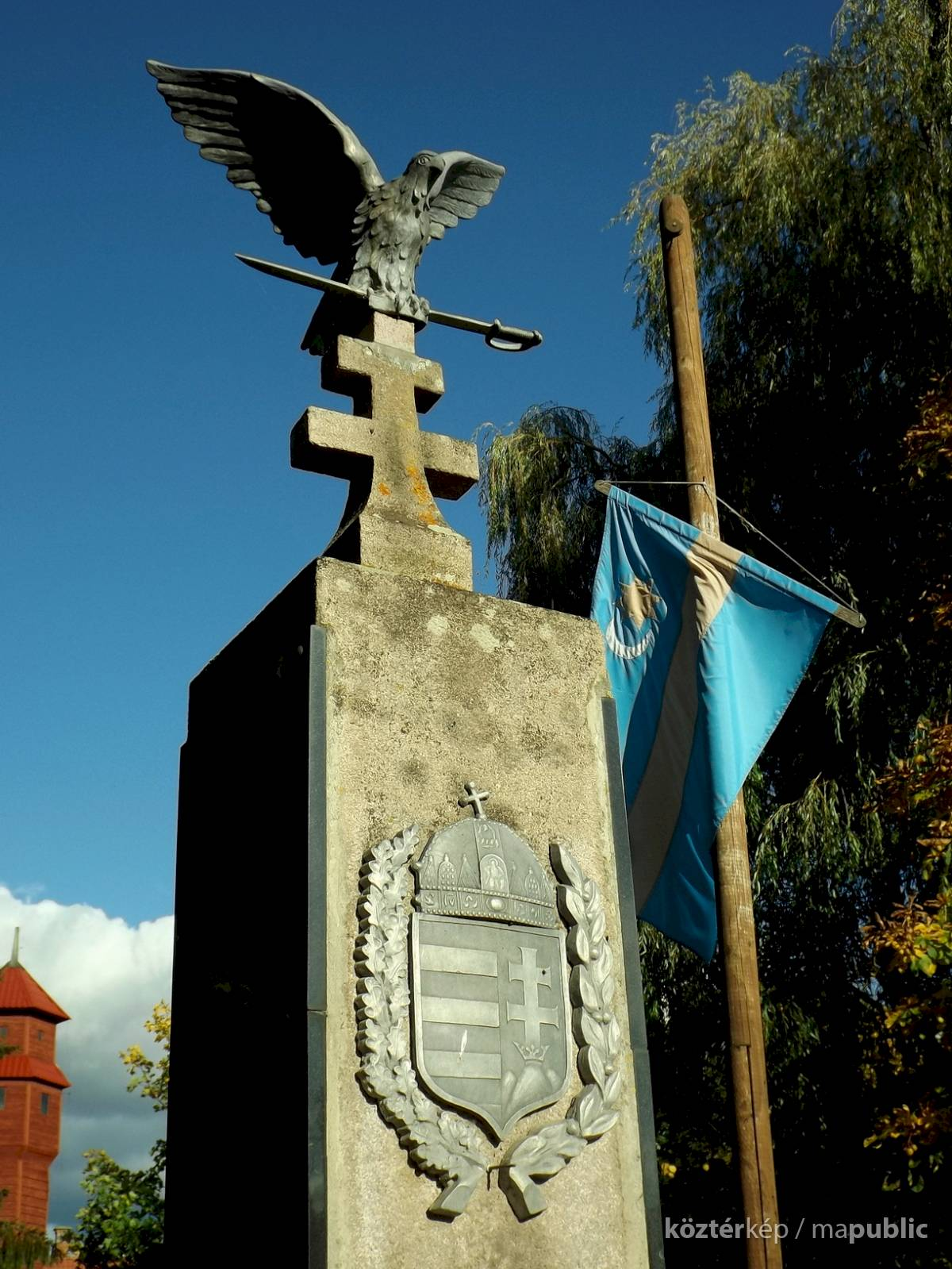
Turul statue on war memorial, Csíkszentmárton (now Sânmartin), Transylvania, Romania (1941)

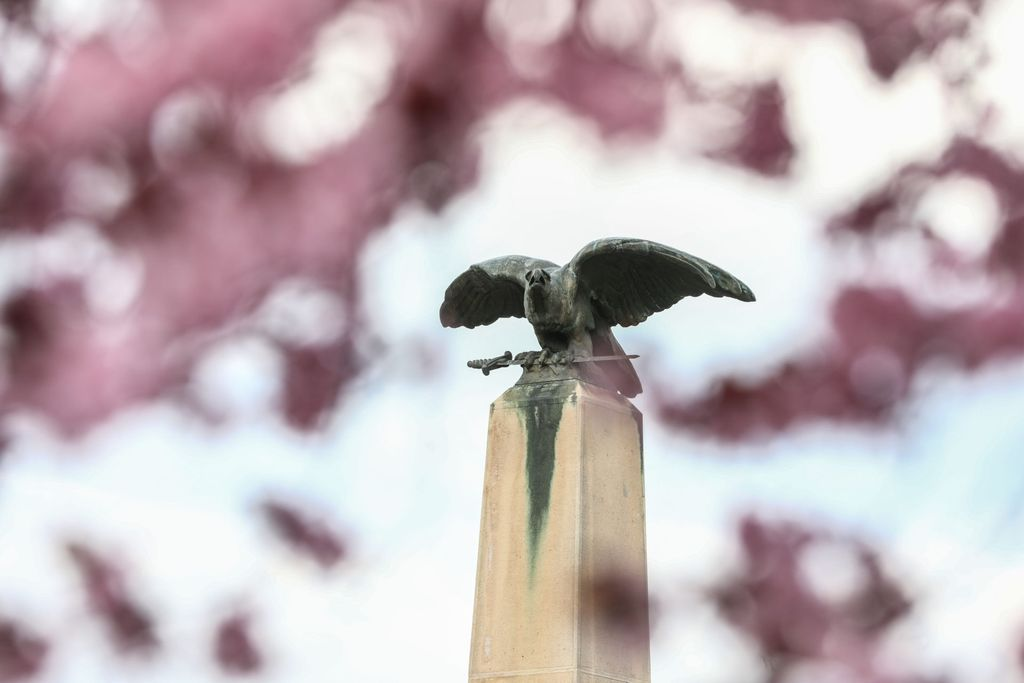
Turul bird statue on the Kossuth Bridge in Győr, Hungary (1928)

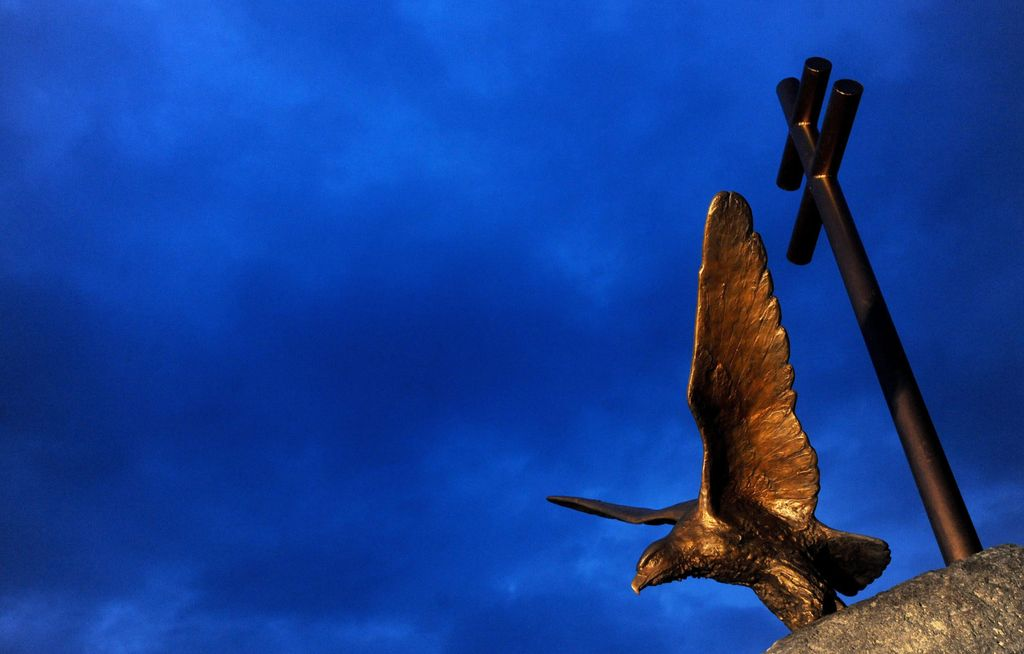
Turul bird on the Trianon memorial in the 14th District of Budapest, Hungary (2012)

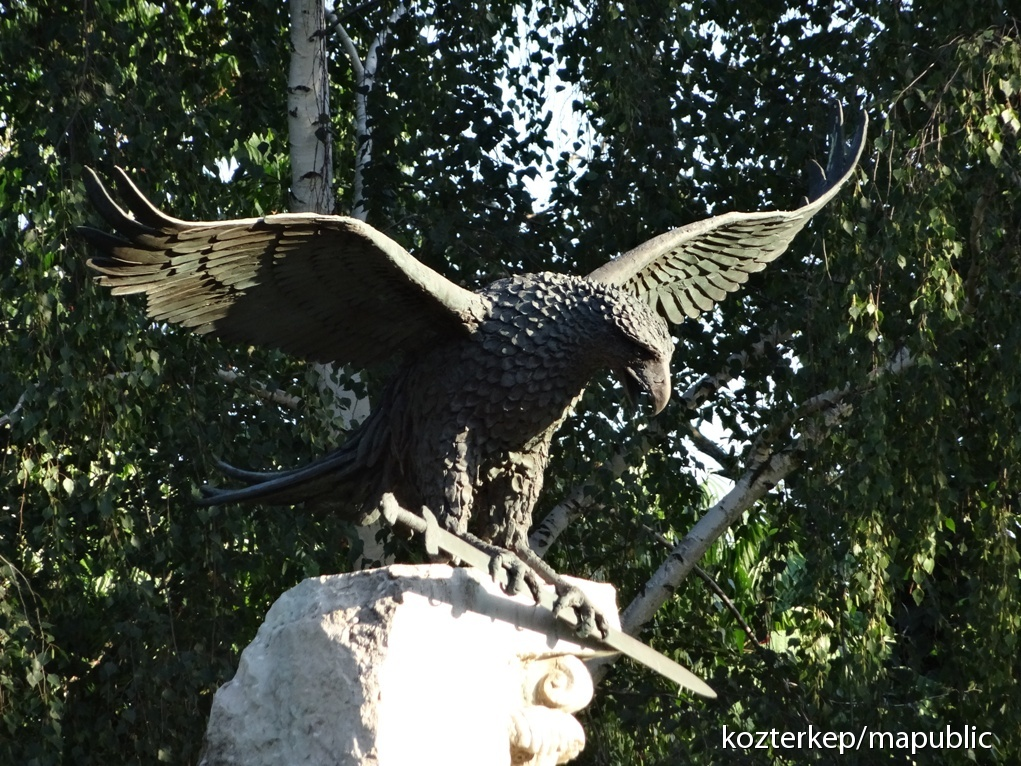
Turul bird, Millennium memorial in Berekfürdő, Hungary (2001)

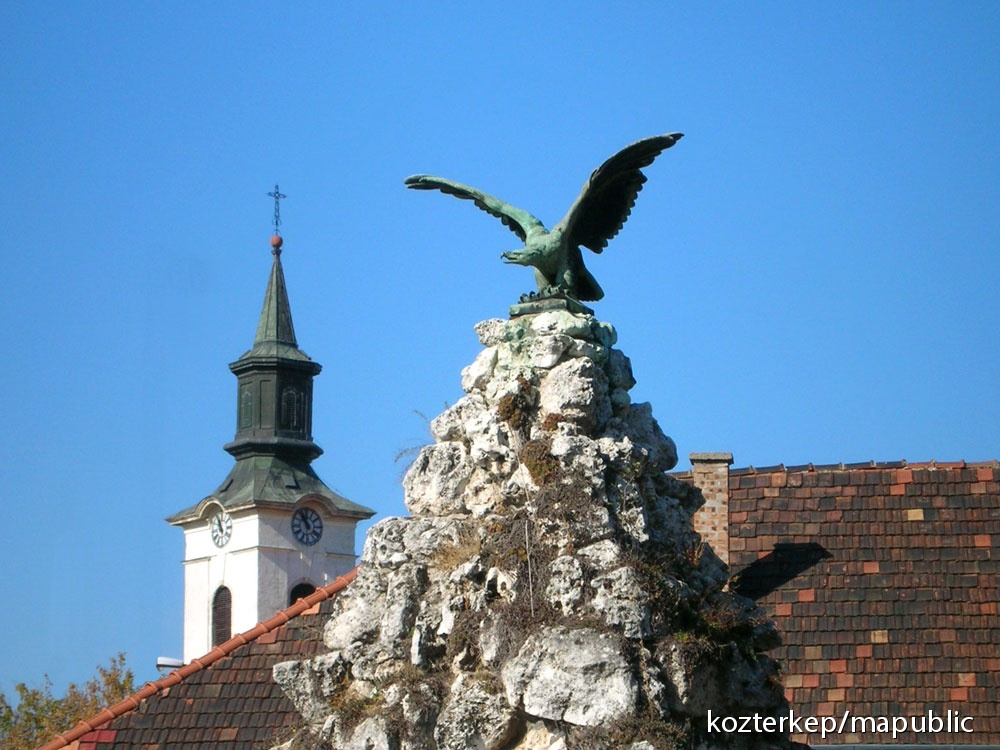
Turul bird in the 22nd District of Budapest, World War 1 memorial, Hungary (1934)

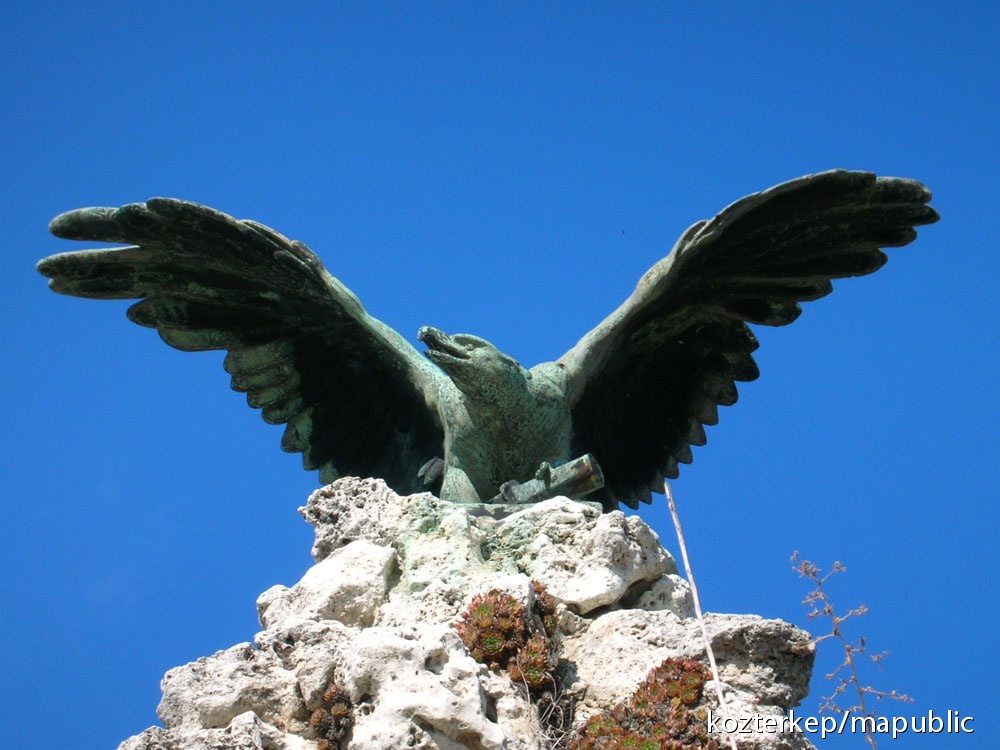
Turul bird in the 22nd District of Budapest, World War 1 memorial, Hungary (1934)

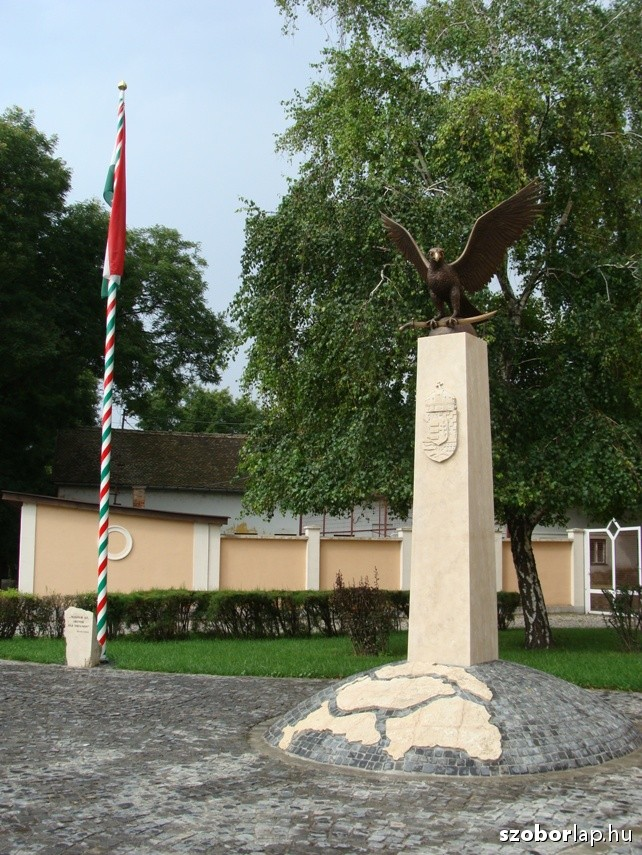
Turul bird on the Trianon memorial in Kisújszállás, Hungary (1936)

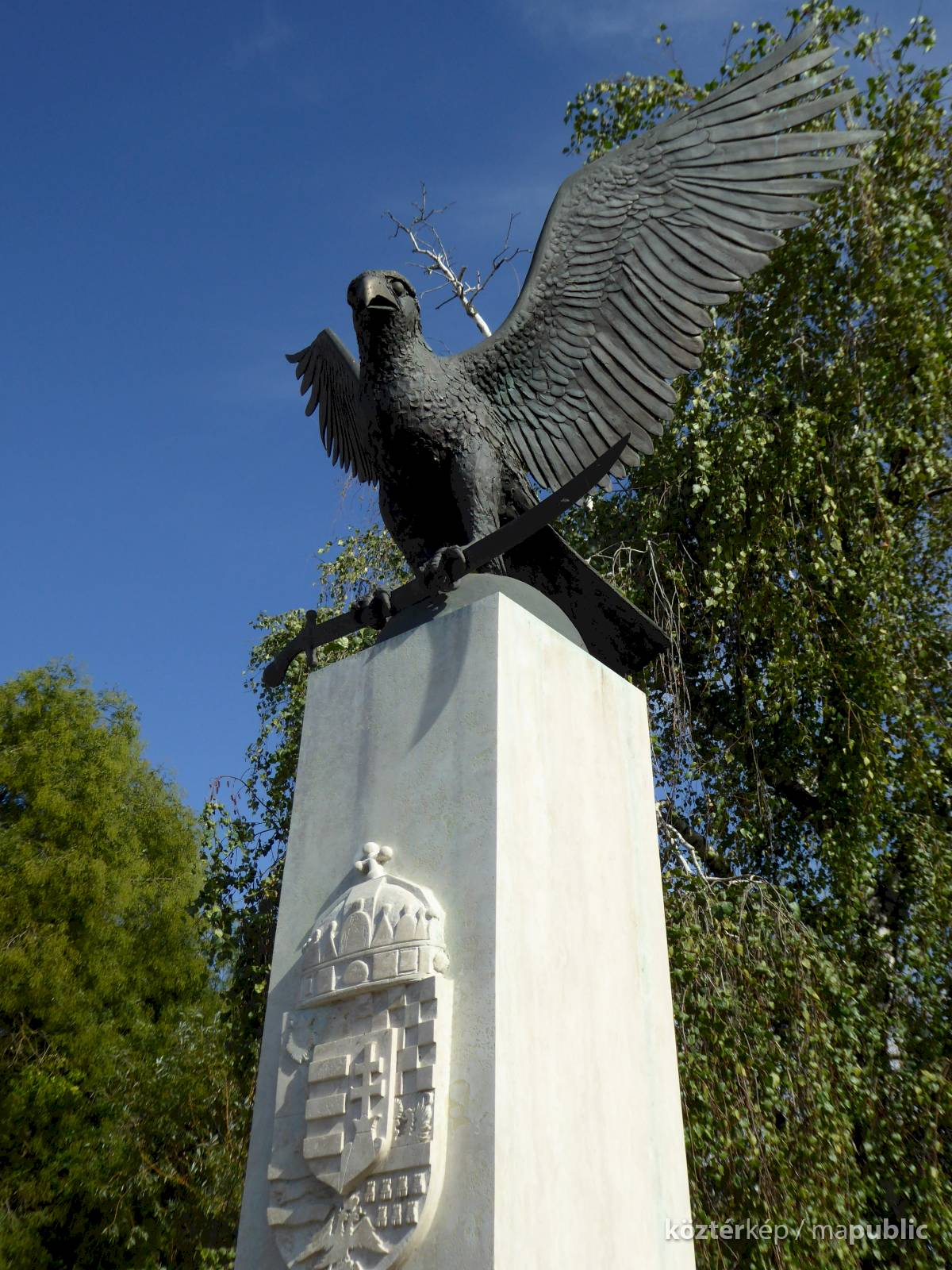
Turul bird on the Trianon memorial in Kisújszállás, Hungary (1936)

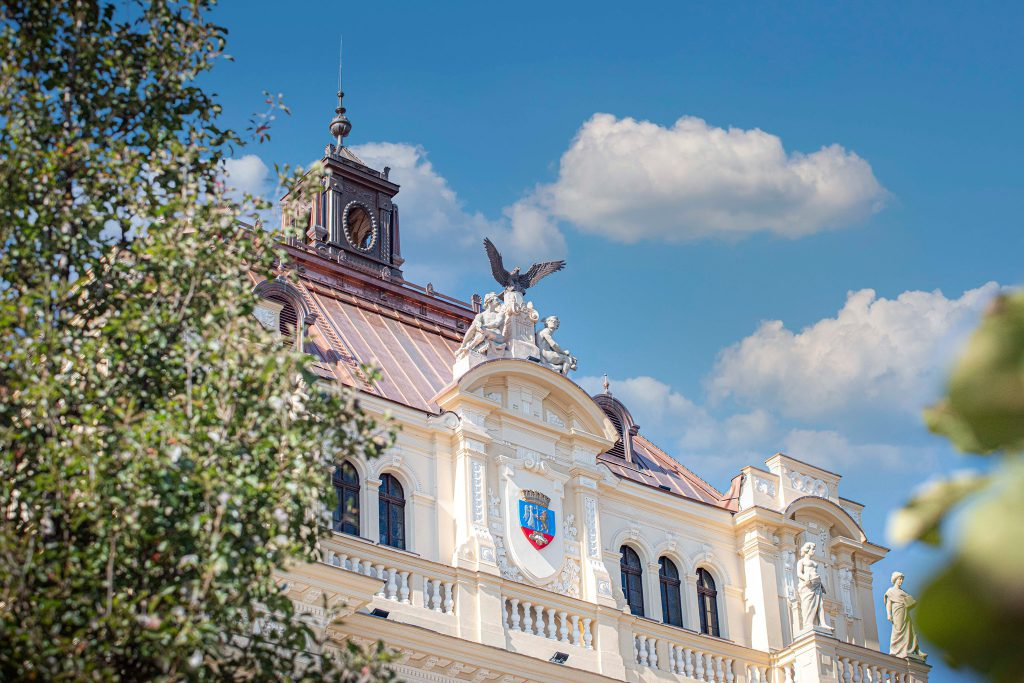
Turul bird on the city hall of Nagyvárad (now Oradea), Romania (1904)

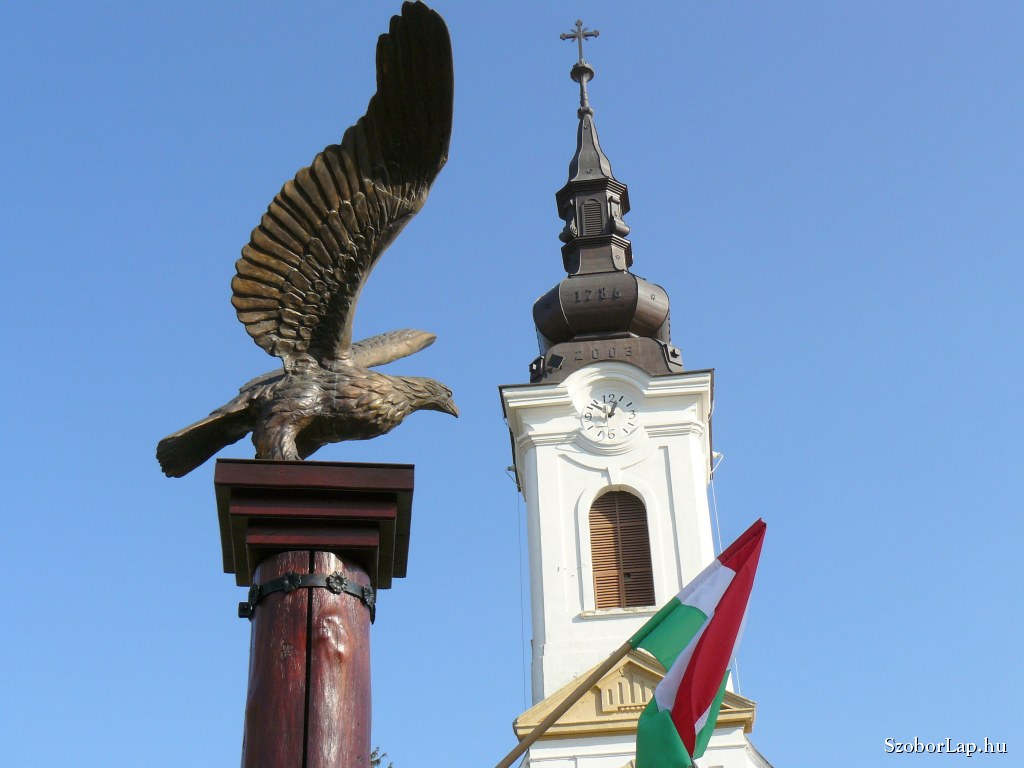
Turul bird in Egyházaskozár, memorial of the Hungarian Revolution of 1848, Hungary (2006)

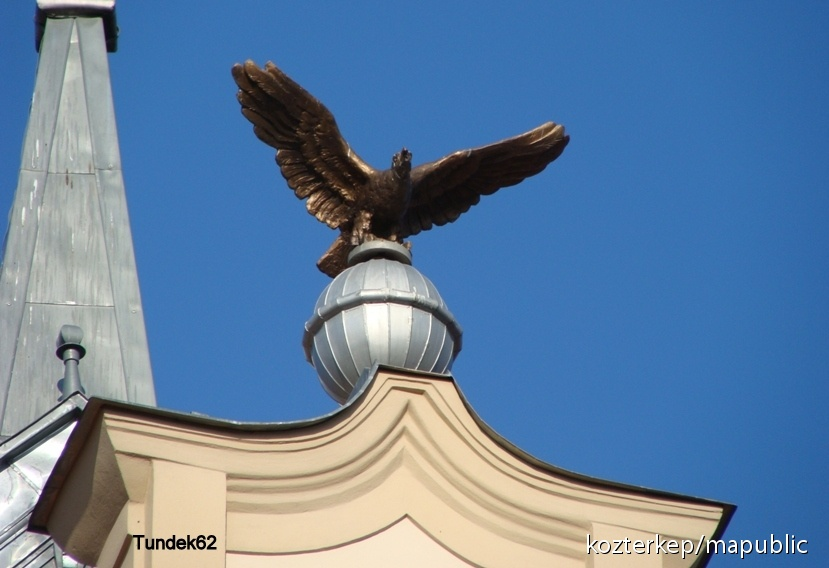
Turul bird on the city hall of Nagyszalonta (now Salonta), Romania (1907)

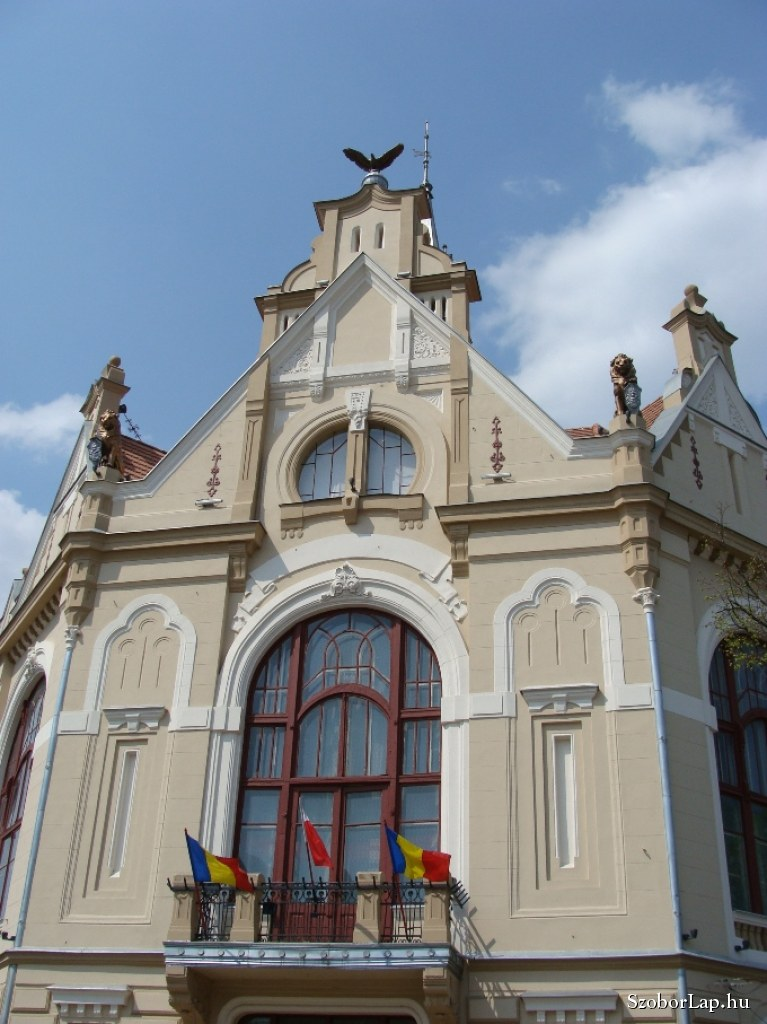
Turul bird on the city hall of Nagyszalonta (now Salonta), Romania (1907)

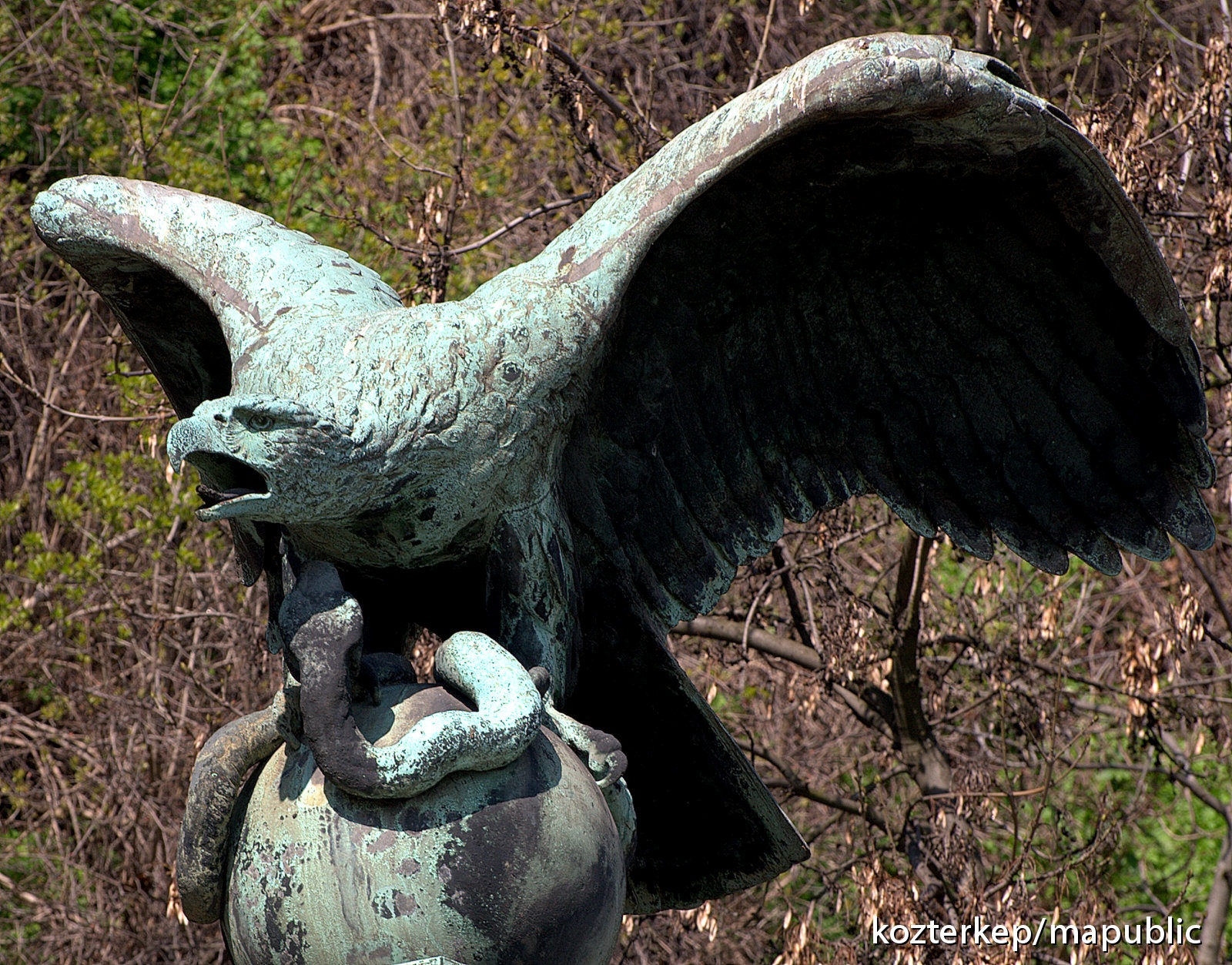
Turul statue at the foot of the Gellért Hill in Budapest, Hungary (1904)

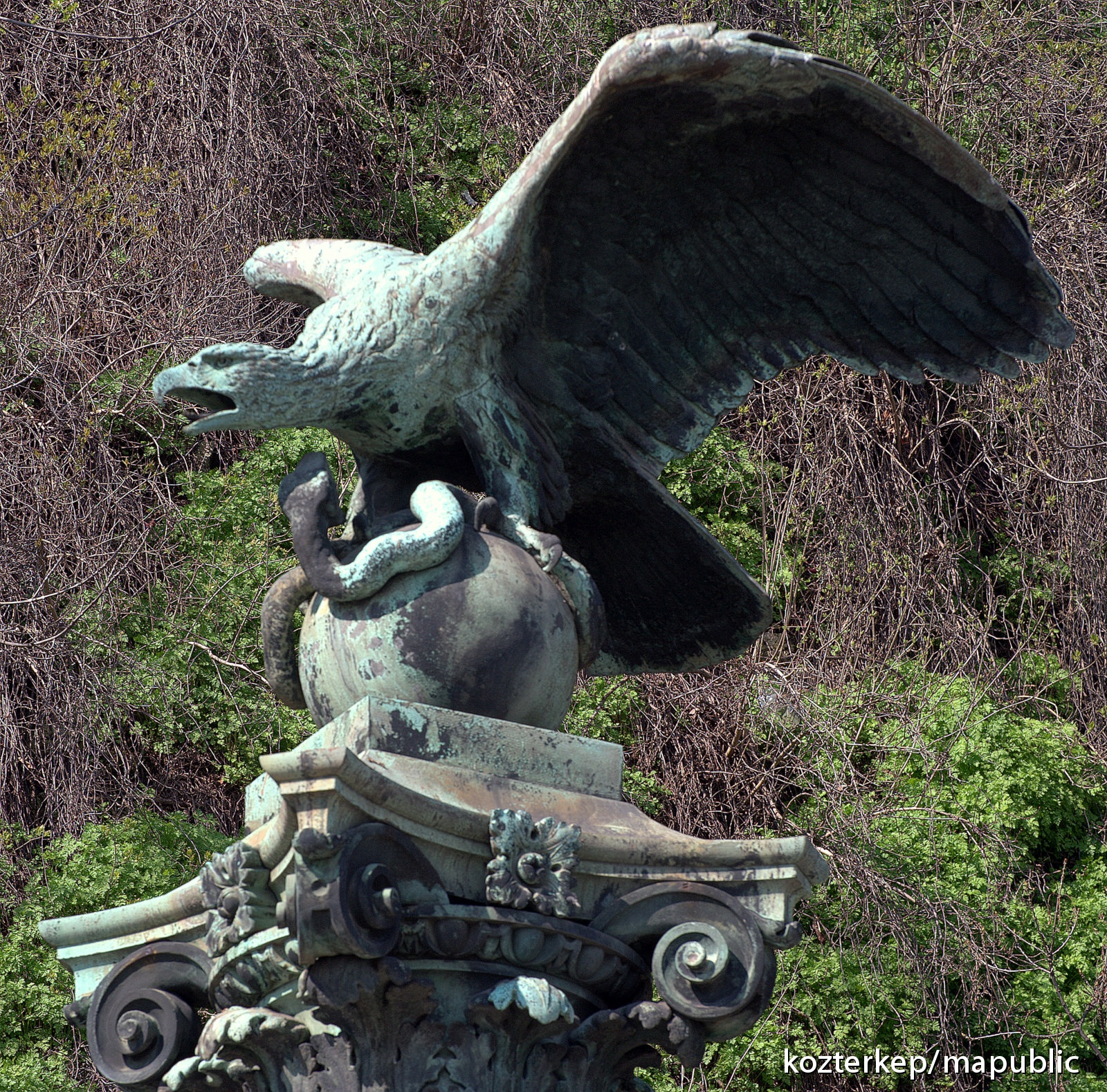
Turul statue at the foot of the Gellért Hill in Budapest, Hungary (1904)

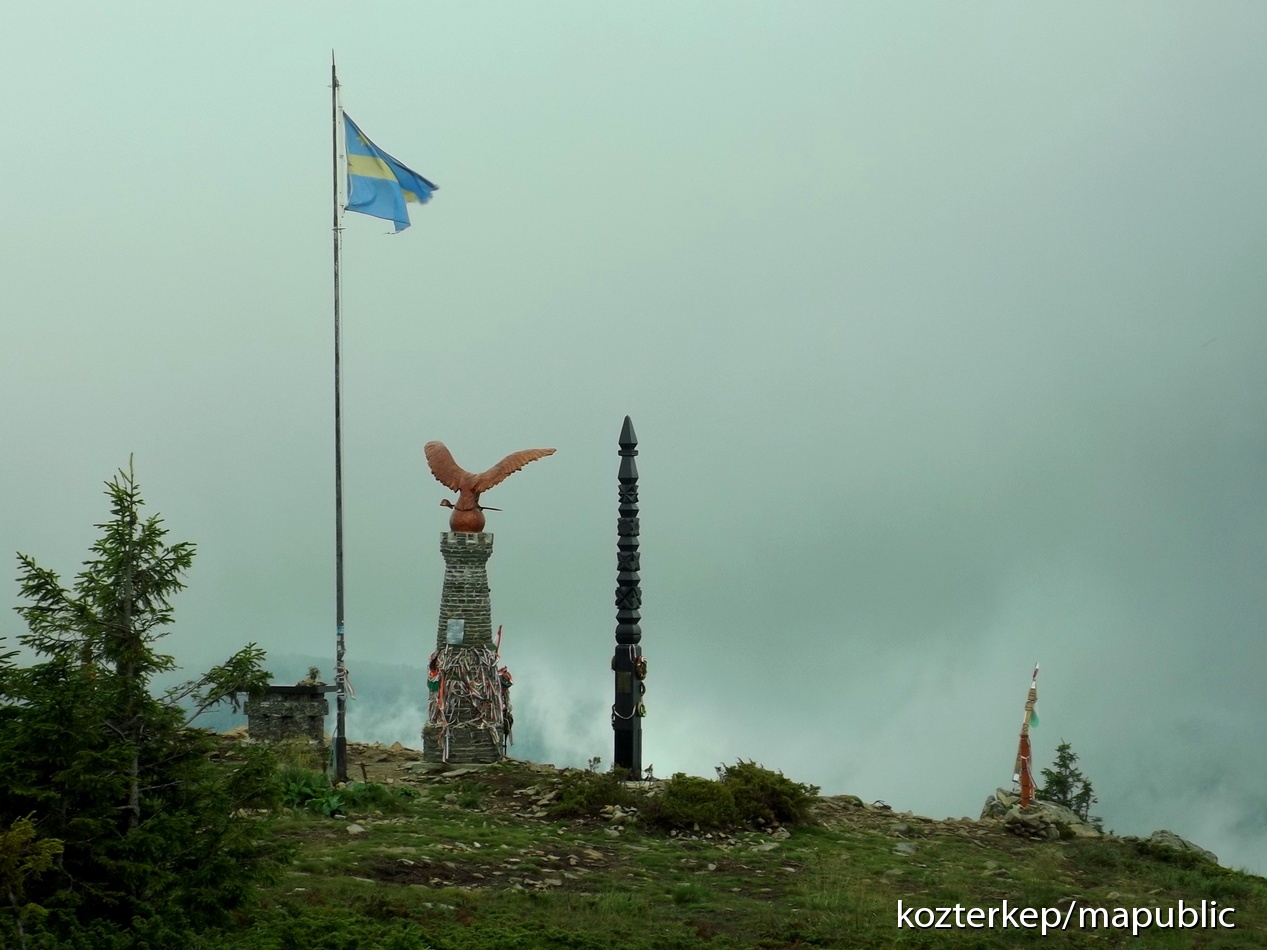
Turul statue near at the peak of the Madarasi-Hargita (Harghita-Mădăraș), the holy mountain of the Székelys (1801 m) in Transylvania, Romania (2014)

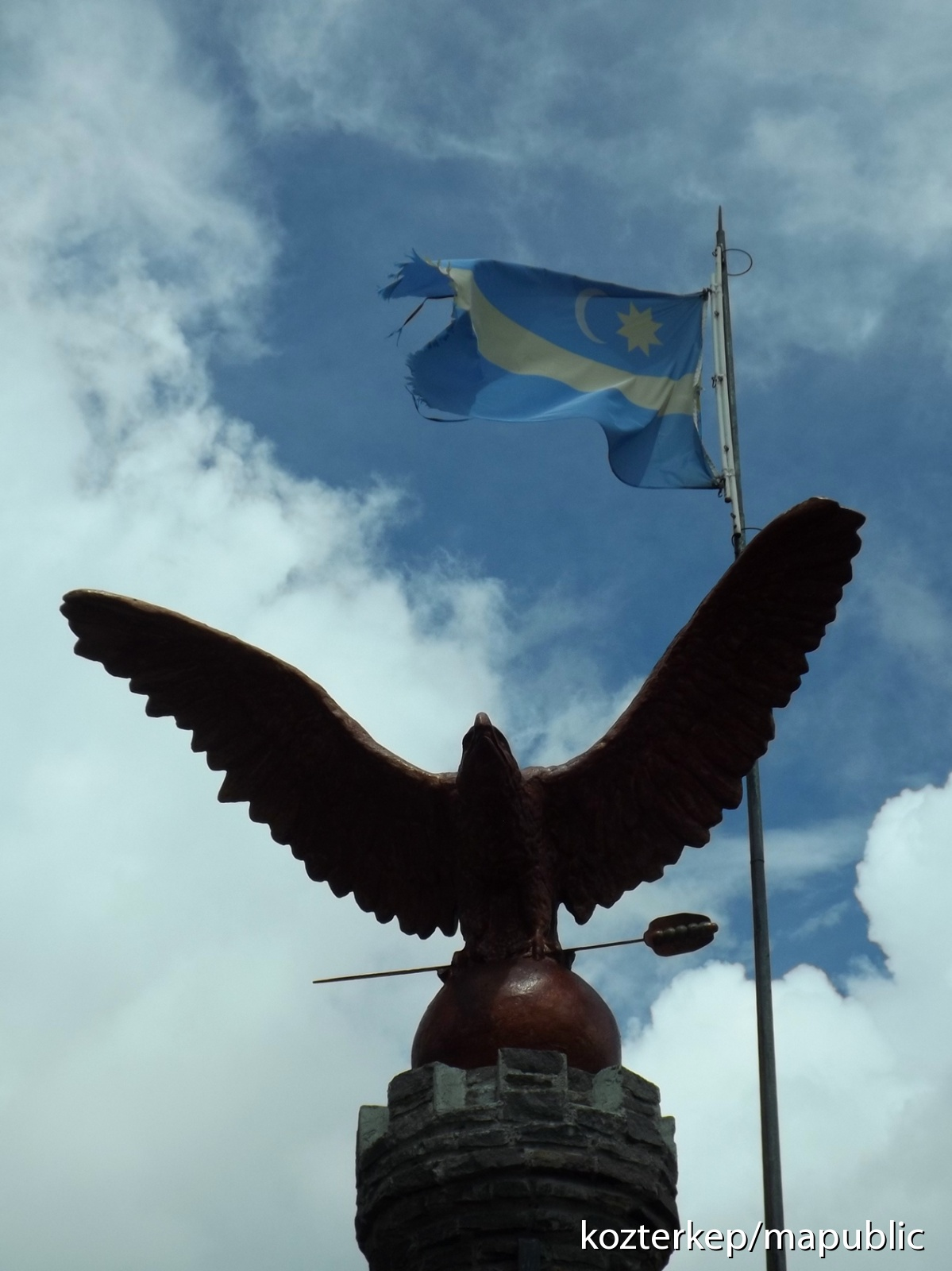
Turul statue near at the peak of the Madarasi-Hargita (Harghita-Mădăraș), the holy mountain of the Székelys (1801 m) in Transylvania, Romania (2014)

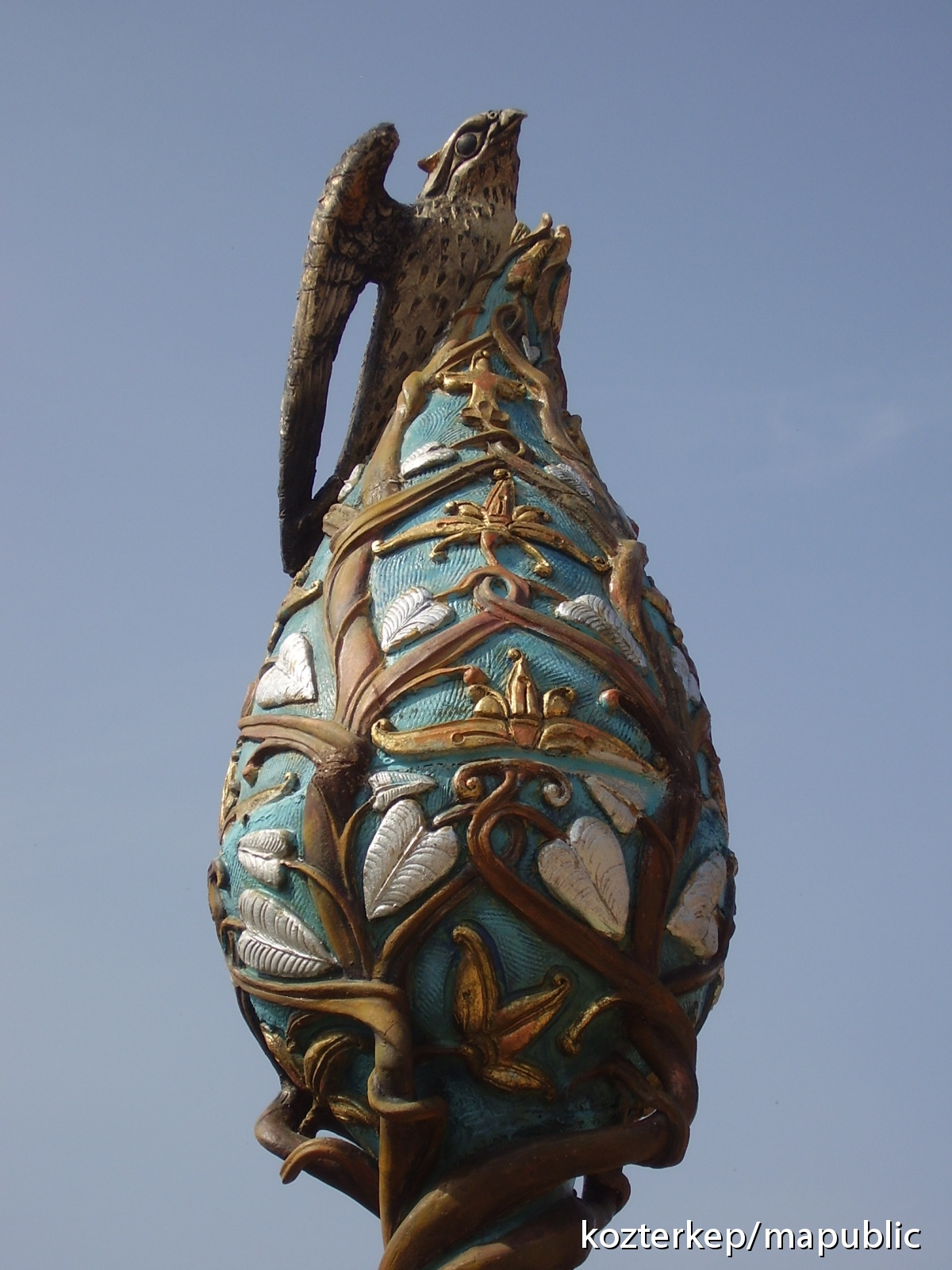
Turul-Tree of Life, Szada, Hungary (2000)

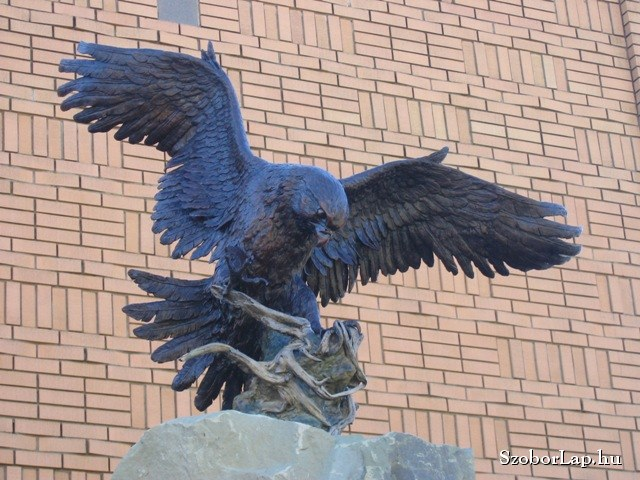
Turul bird in Lethbridge, Canada (2006)

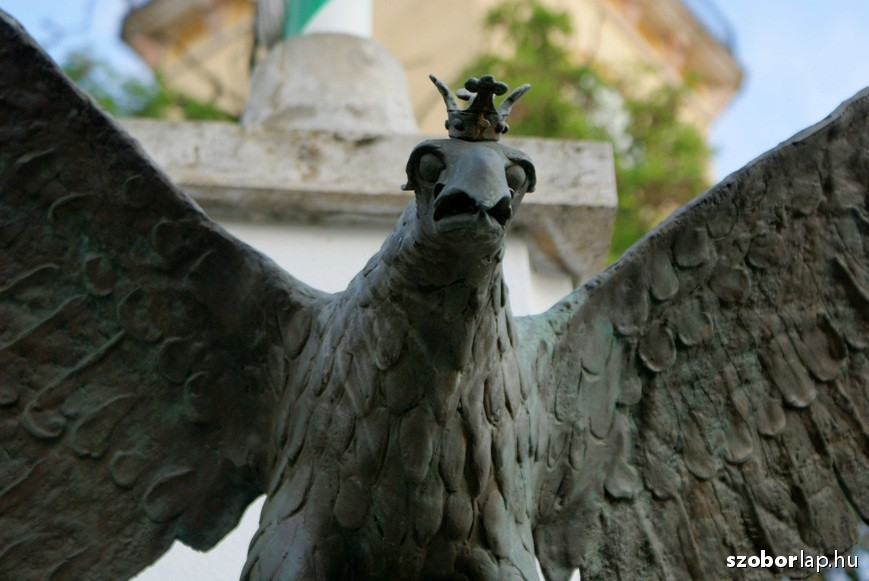
Crown headed Turul bird in Karcag, Hungary (1996)

== See also ==
- National symbols of Hungary
- Flag and coat of arms of Transylvania
- Simurgh
- Konrul
- Triple-headed eagle
- Classical overture "The Myth of Falcon" inspired by Turul
