= Banat =

Historical region in eastern-central Europe

Banat Banat (Romanian) Банат (Serbian) Bánság (Hungarian)
- Historical region of Central Europe
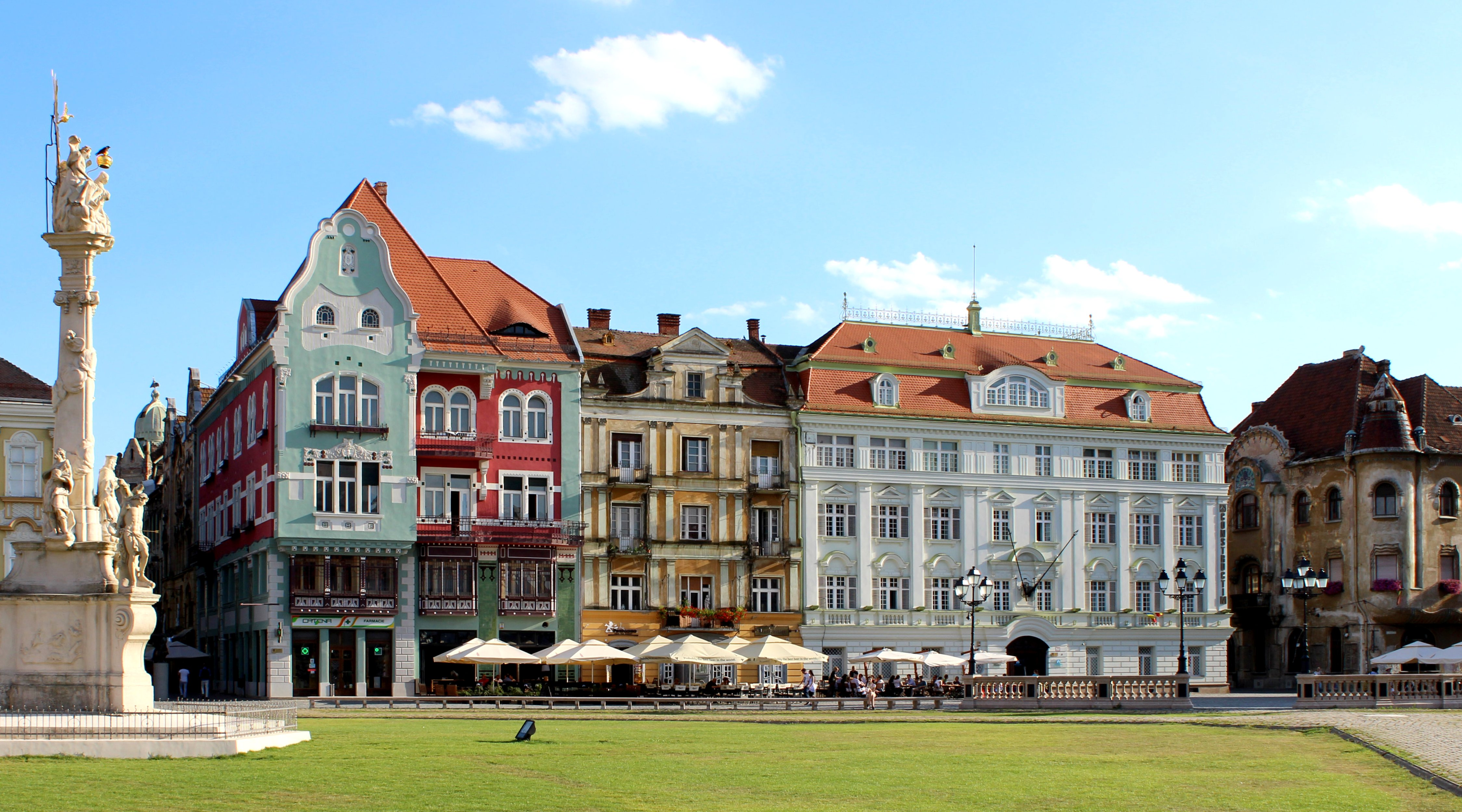
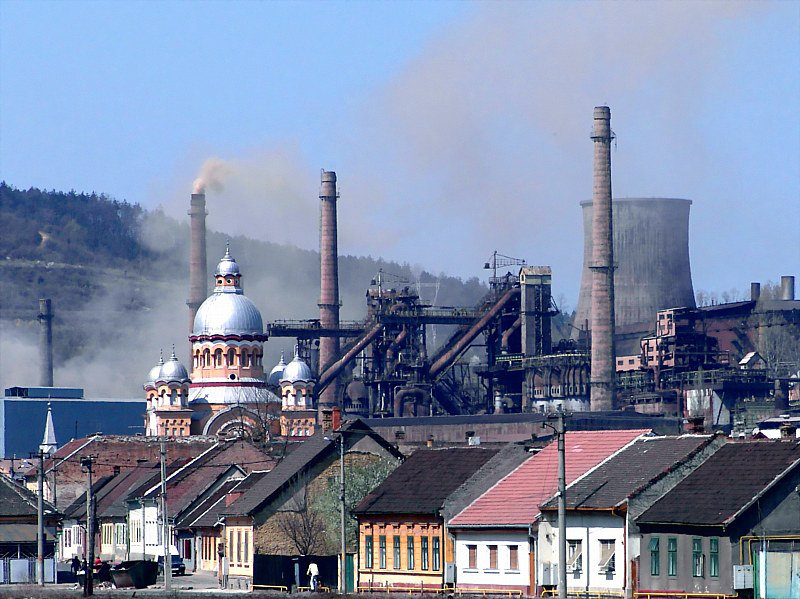
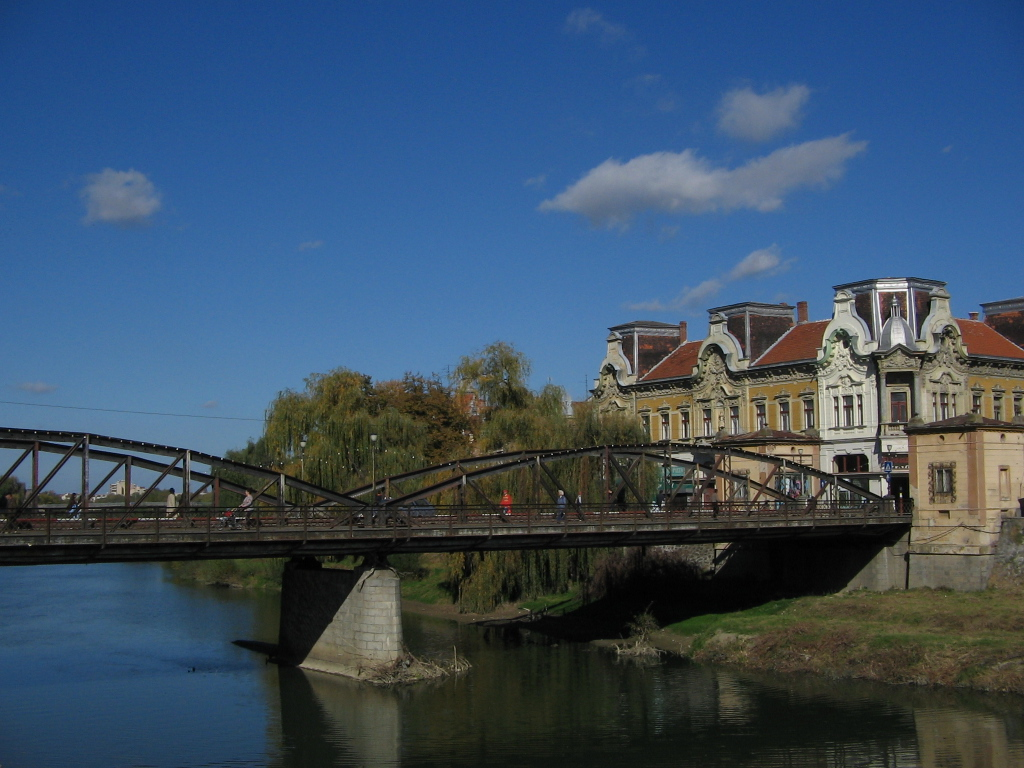
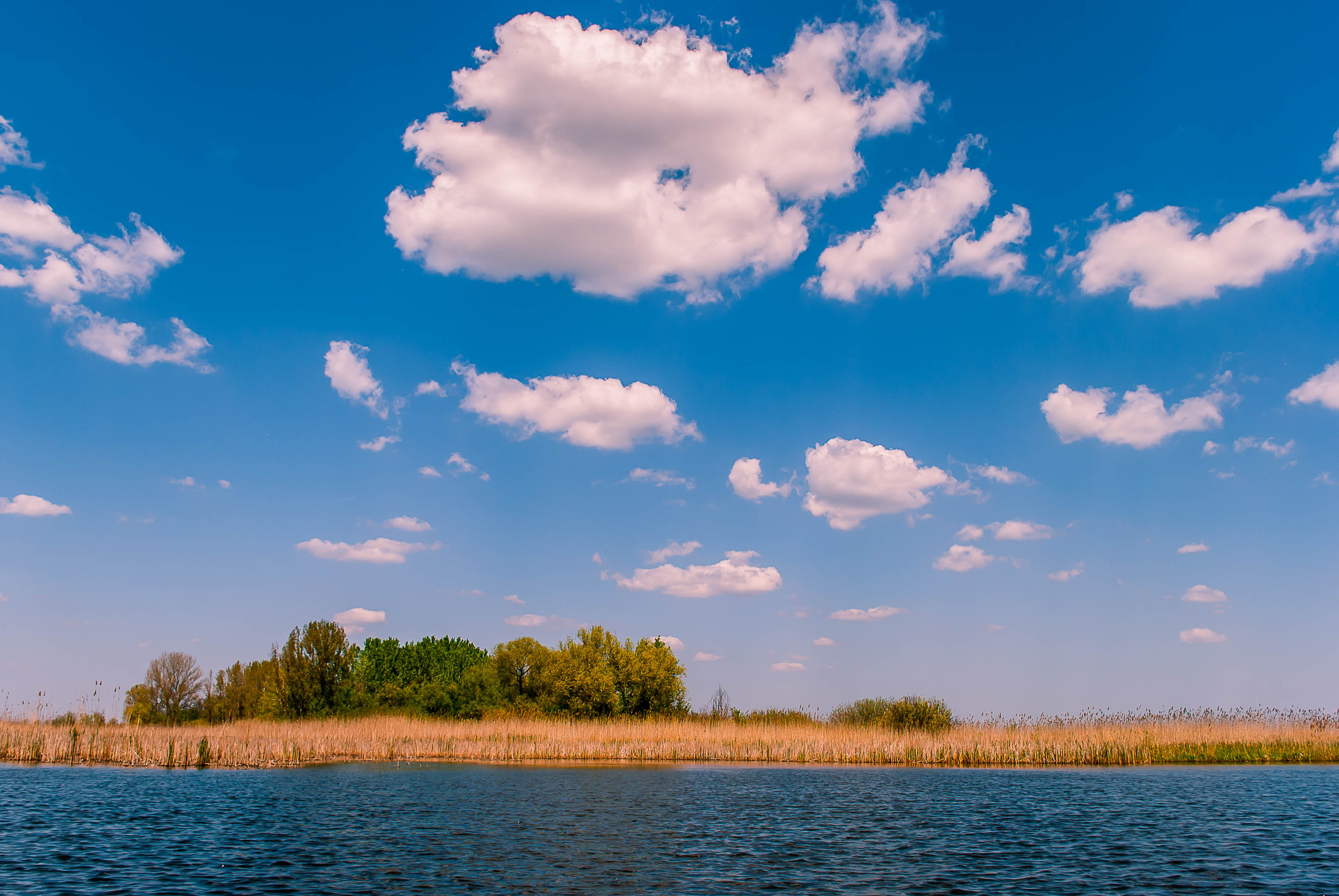
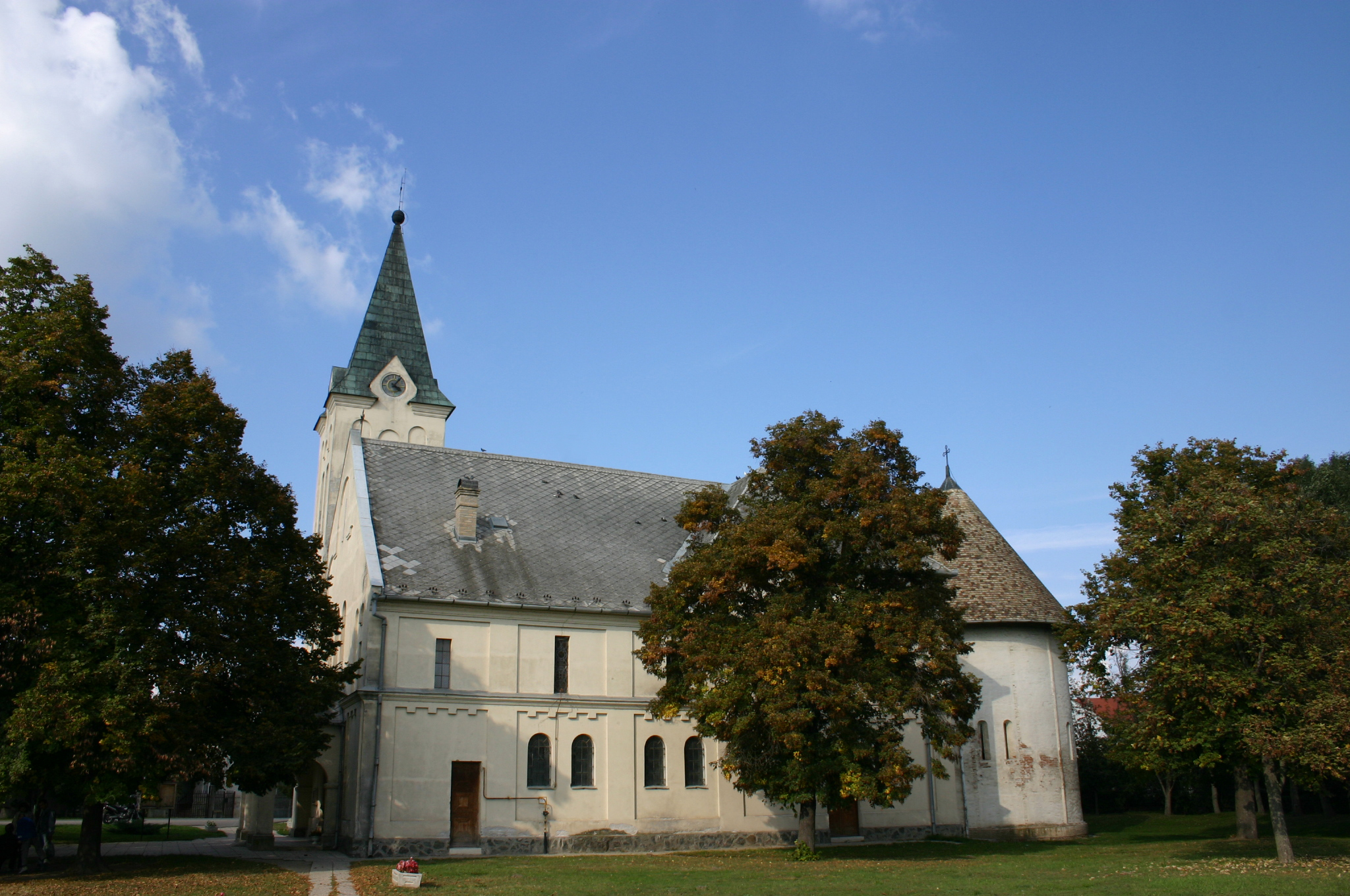
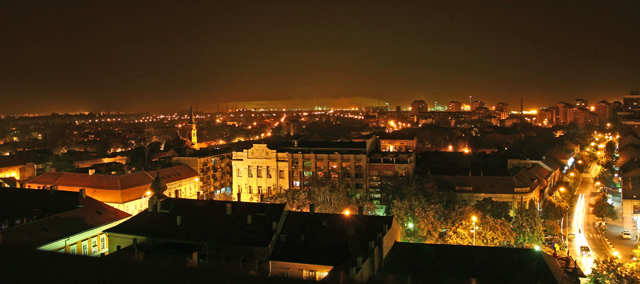
- Timișoara Union Square Reșița Works Timiș River in Lugoj Carska Bara in Zrenjanin Kiszombor Roman Catholic Church Panorama of Pančevo at night

- Map of the region of Banat
- Country: Romania; Serbia; Hungary
- Largest city: Timișoara

Area
  - Total: 27,104 km^{2} (10,465 sq mi)
- Primary airport: Timișoara Traian Vuia International Airport

Location of Banat (dark green) in Europe (territorially-involved countries in light green)

Banat (UK: /ˈbænɪt, ˈbɑːn-/ BAN-it, BAHN-, US: /bəˈnɑːt, bɑː-/ bə-NAHT, bah-; Romanian: Banat; Hungarian: Bánság; Serbian: Банат, romanized: Banat) is a geographical and historical region located in the Pannonian or Carpathian Basin that straddles Central and Eastern Europe. It is divided among three countries: the eastern part lies in western Romania (the counties of Timiș, Caraș-Severin, Arad south of the Mureș river, and the western part of Mehedinți); the western part of Banat is in northeastern Serbia (mostly included in Vojvodina, except for a small part included in the Belgrade Region); and a small northern part lies within southeastern Hungary (Csongrád-Csanád County).

The region's historical ethnic diversity was severely affected by the events of World War II. Today, Banat is mostly populated by ethnic Romanians, Serbs and Hungarians, but small populations of other ethnic groups also live in the region. Nearly all are citizens of either Serbia, Romania or Hungary.

== Etymology ==
During the Middle Ages, the term "banate" designated a frontier province led by a military governor who was called a ban. Such provinces existed mainly in South Slavic, Hungarian and Romanian lands. In South Slavic and other regional languages, terms for banate were: Serbian бановина / banovina, Hungarian bánság, Romanian banat and Latin banatus. Several theories have been proposed for the etymological origin of the regionym "Banat". A first theory claims that it comes from the root of a verb found in several Germanic peoples, namely ban. This term means 'to proclaim' or 'to announce'. From there it passed into medieval Latin, under the form bannum, which means – among the Frankish peoples, for example – 'proclamation', but also the district on which the said proclamation was to have effects. Another theory puts forward the Persian origin of the word ban; in Persian ban (بان) means 'master'. From this language, it would have been taken over by the Avars and brought to Pannonia, where they ruled in the 6th–8th centuries. Another interpretation is also related to Avars, according to which the origin of the word ban would come from the name of the first khagan of the Avar Khaganate, Bayan I. These views are contradicted by those who believe that ban comes from an old Proto-Indo-European root, *bʰa, which means 'to speak'.

At the time of the medieval Hungarian kingdom, the territory of modern Banat appeared in written sources as Temesköz (first mentioned in 1374). The Hungarian name mainly referred to the lowland areas between the Mureș, Tisza and Danube rivers. Its Ottoman name was "Eyalet of Temeşvar" (later "Eyalet of Yanova"). During the Turkish occupation, the territory of Temesköz (Banat) was also called Rascia ('the country of the Serbs', 1577). For Romanians, the region was also known as Temișana.

In the early modern period, there were two banates that partially or entirely included the territory of what is referred to in the current era as Banat: the Banate of Lugoj and Caransebeș in the 16th–17th centuries and the Banate of Temeswar in the 18th–19th centuries. The word Banat without any other qualification typically refers to the historical Banate of Temeswar, which acquired this title after the 1718 Treaty of Passarowitz. The name was also used from 1941 to 1944, during Axis occupation, for the short-lived political entity (see: Banat (1941–44)), which covered only today's Serbian part of the historical Banat.

The name "Banat" is similar in different languages of the region; Romanian: Banat, Serbo-Croatian: Банат/Banat, Hungarian: Bánság or Bánát, Bulgarian: Банат, Czech: Banát, German: Banat, Greek: Βανάτο/Vanáto, Slovak: Banát, Turkish: Banat, Ukrainian: Банат. Some of these languages would also have other terms, from their own frame of reference, to describe this historical and geographic region.

== History ==
The first known inhabitants of present-day Banat were the Neolithic populations. In the 4th century BC, Celtic tribes settled in this area. Various Hallstatt and La Tène objects have been found in this area. The most important tribes were the Scordisci and the Taurisci. The Scordisci, who formed a powerful state, even minted their own coins in imitation of the Macedonian tetradrachm. Along with all the other tribes in the region, the Scordisci were subjugated by the Getic ruler Burebista; their region was thus part of the Dacian kingdom under Burebista in the first century BC, but the balance of power in the area partially changed during the campaigns of Augustus. At the beginning of the 2nd century AD, Trajan led two wars against the Dacians: the campaigns of 101–102 and those of 105–106. Eventually, the territory of Banat fell under Roman rule. It became an important link between the province of Dacia and the other parts of the Empire. Roman rule had a significant impact: castra and guard stations were established and roads and public buildings built. The public bath establishments of Ad Aquas Herculis, modern-day Băile Herculane, were also established. Some of the important Roman settlements in Banat were Arcidava (today Vărădia), Centum Putea, Berzobis (today Berzovia), Tibiscum (today Jupa), Agnaviae (today Zăvoi), Ad Pannonios (today Teregova), Praetorium (today Mehadia), and Dierna (today Orșova).

In 273 AD Emperor Aurelian withdrew the Roman Army from Dacia. The area fell into the hands of foederati such as the Sarmatians (Iazyges, Roxolani, Limigantes) and later the Goths, who also took control of other parts of Dacia.

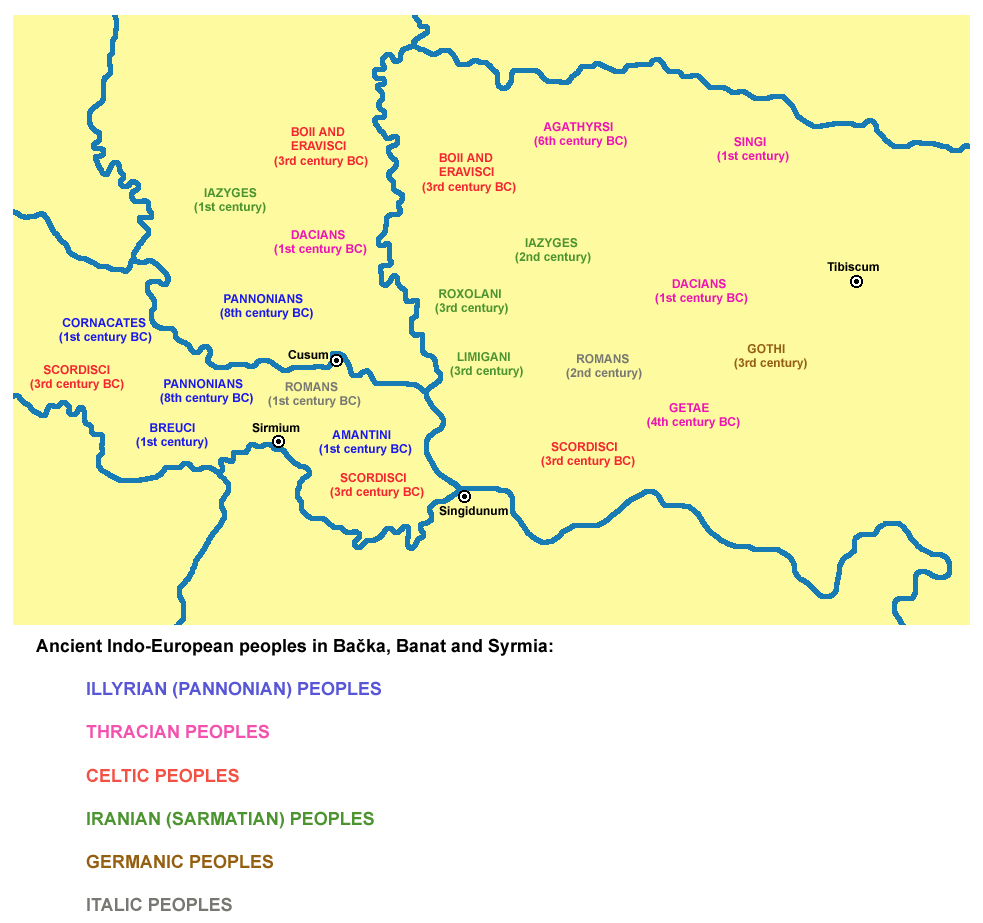
Ancient Indo-European peoples in Banat

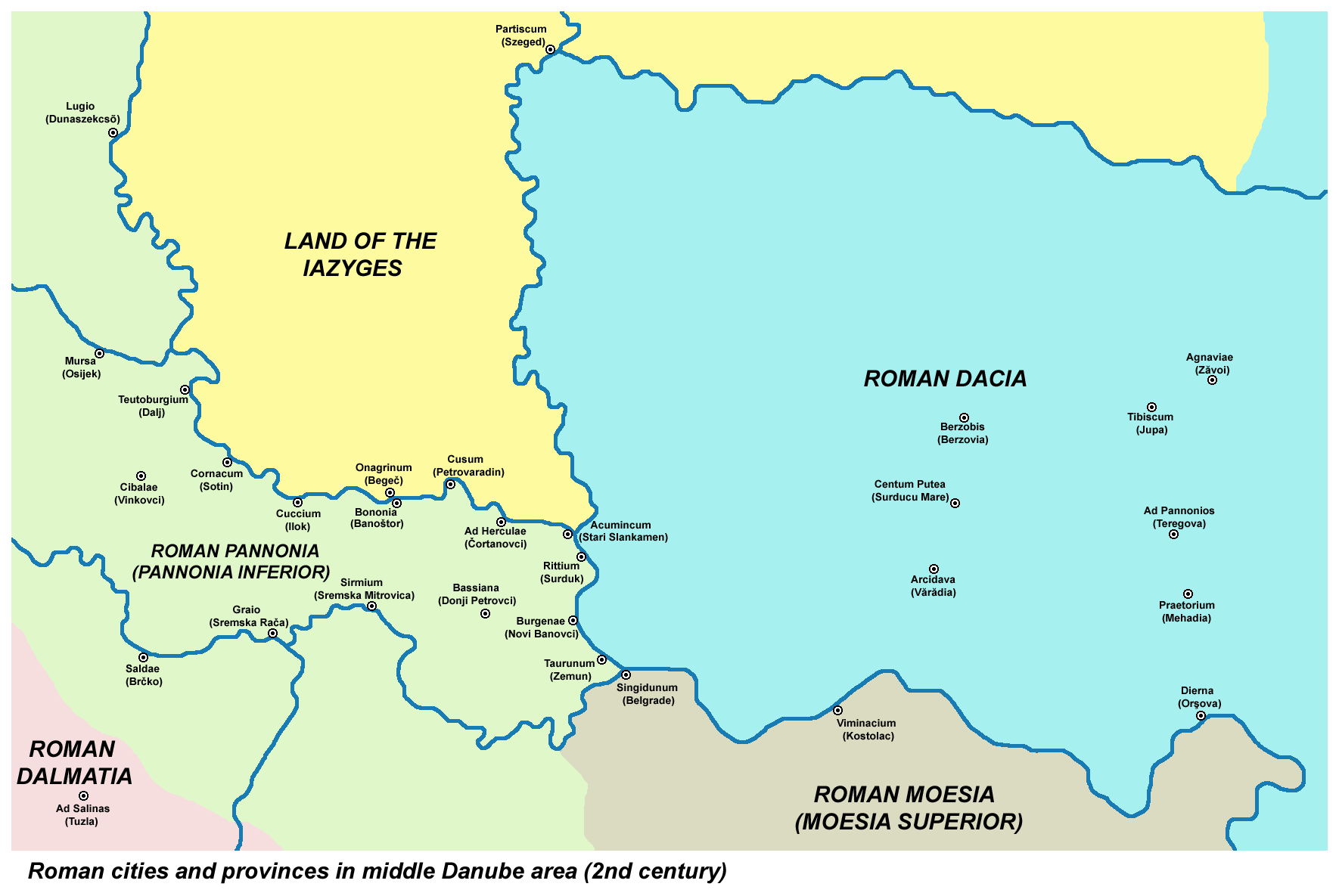
Ancient Roman cities in Banat

=== Migration Period and Early Middle Ages ===
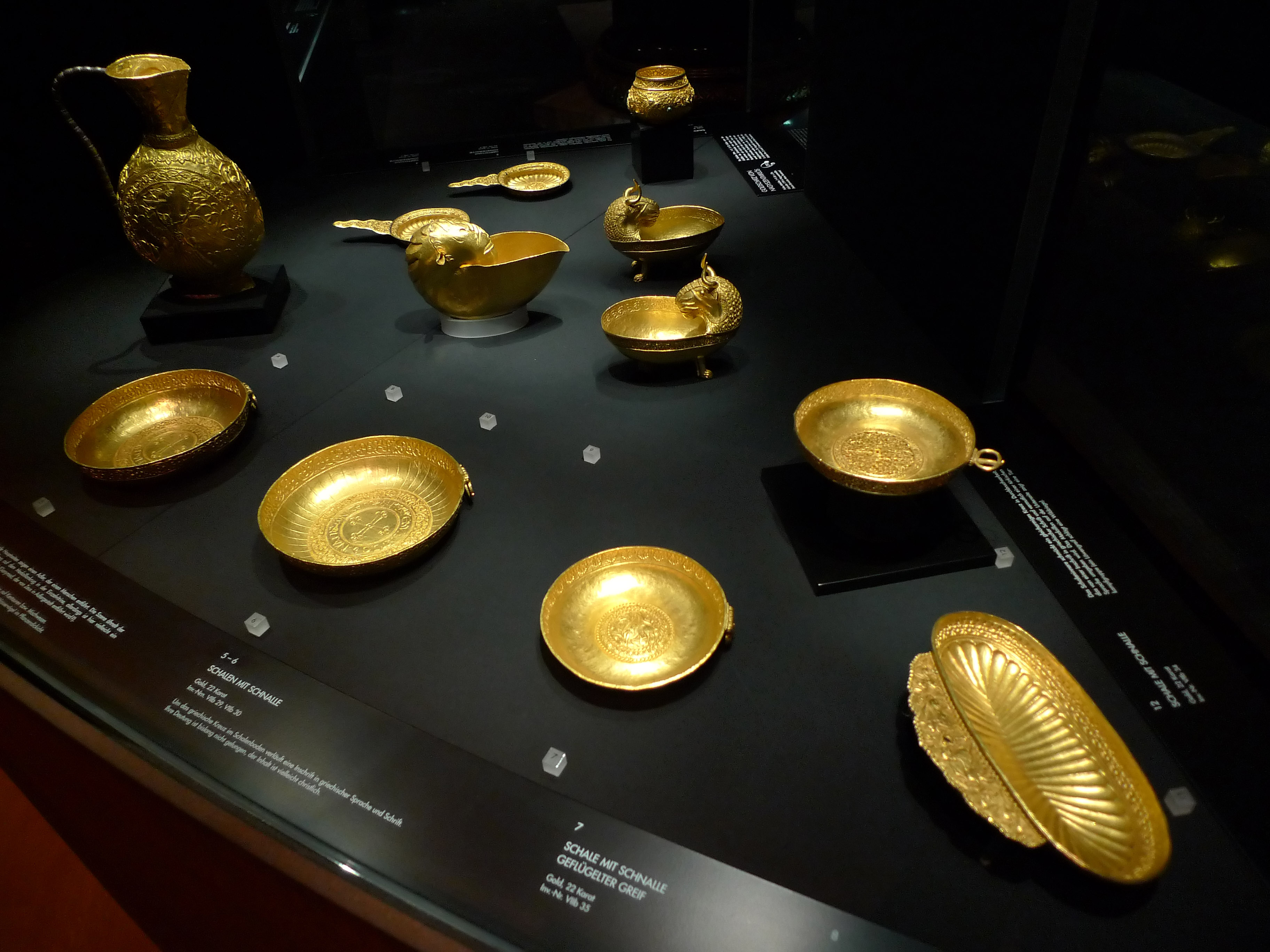
Part of the Treasure of Sânnicolau Mare in the Kunsthistorisches Museum

The Goths were forced out by the Huns, who organized their ruling center in the Pannonian Plain, an area that included the northwestern part of today's Banat. After the death of Attila, the Hunnic empire disintegrated in days. The previously subjected Gepids formed a new kingdom in the area, only to be defeated 100 years later by the Avars.

One governing center of the Avars was formed in the region, which played an important role in the Avar–Byzantine wars. An inscription on one of the vessels from the Treasure of Sânnicolau Mare (whose origin is disputed) recorded the names of two local rulers, Butaul and Buyla, who bore the Slavic ruling title of župan. Avar rule over the area lasted until Charlemagne's campaigns in the 9th century. The Banat region became part of the First Bulgarian Empire a few decades later. Archaeological evidence shows the Avars and Gepids lived here until the middle of the 10th century. Avar rule had triggered considerable Slavic migration to the southern Pannonian plain and to the Balkans.

In 895, the Hungarians living in Etelköz entered the Byzantine-Bulgarian war as allies of Byzantium and defeated the Bulgars. Because of this, the Bulgarians allied with the Pechenegs, who attacked the Hungarian settlements. This led to the process of what is known as the Hungarian conquest of the Pannonian Basin, referred to by them as "home-taking" (honfoglalás) in Hungarian. This also resulted in the loss of part of the territories north of the Danube for the Bulgarian Empire.

According to the chronicle Gesta Hungarorum, a local ruler known as Glad ruled over Banat; his army was made up of Vlachs, Bulgarians, and Cumans. Ahtum was another early 11th-century ruler in the territory now known as Banat. His primary source is the Long Life of Saint Gerard, a 14th-century hagiography. Chanadinus, Ahtum's former commander-in-chief, defeated and killed Ahtum, occupying his realm.

=== Hungarian rule (11th–16th centuries) ===
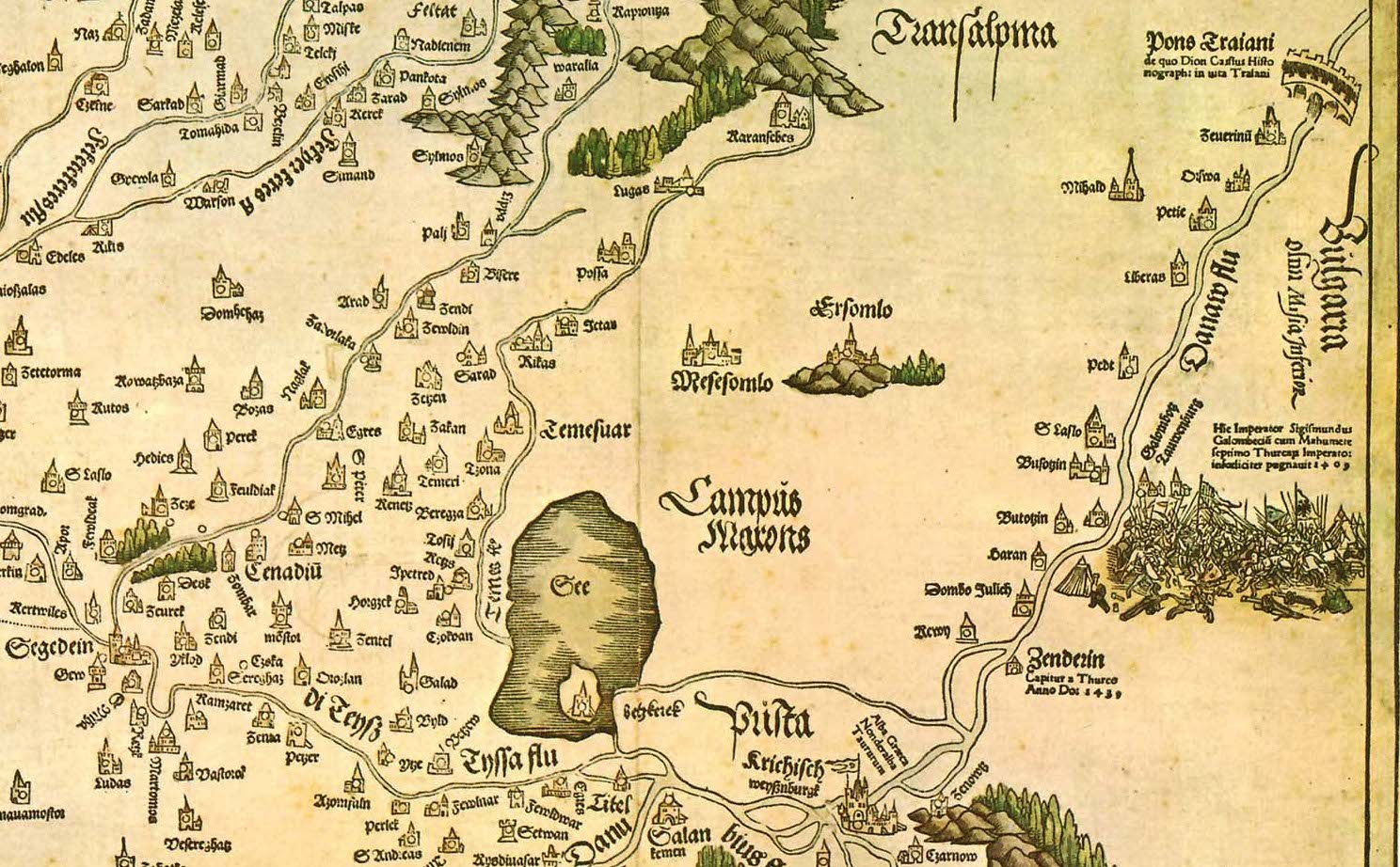
Banat in 16th-century map Tabula Hungariae. Note the dramatic geographic changes — a large lake around Zrenjanin is today dried out.

Banat was administered by the First Bulgarian Empire from the 9th to the 11th century, but that control gradually shifted to the Kingdom of Hungary, which administered it from the 11th century up until 1552, when the region of Temesvár (today Timișoara) was captured by the Ottoman Empire.

The area of the Timiș river was not the land of the Hungarian royal tribe. When nomadic Hungarians came to Transylvania there was no direct Bulgarian political rule there. In the eastern part of the Carpathian Basin, the Byzantine rite became more influential after Ajtony's (Latin: Ahtum) conversion to Christianity. This was halted with the establishment of the Kingdom of Hungary. István I reasserted dominance over the last local leader, Ajtony. He was a semi-independent ruler of Banat and a formally baptized Christian who constructed a Byzantine monastery at Morisena, but still kept 7 wives and worshiped pagan gods at his Court. His vassal Csanád defeated Ajtony by the will of King István I of Hungary. The territory of the modern Banat did not form a separate territorial unit in medieval Kingdom of Hungary but was an integral part of it. The territory was divided among Krassó, Keve, Temes, Csanád, Arad and Torontál counties.

In 1233, under the Kingdom of Hungary administration, the Banate of Severin, a military frontier area was formed, including some eastern parts of the modern Banat. In the 14th century, the region became of priority concern to the Kingdom, as the southern border of Banat was the most important defensive line against Ottoman expansion from the southeast.

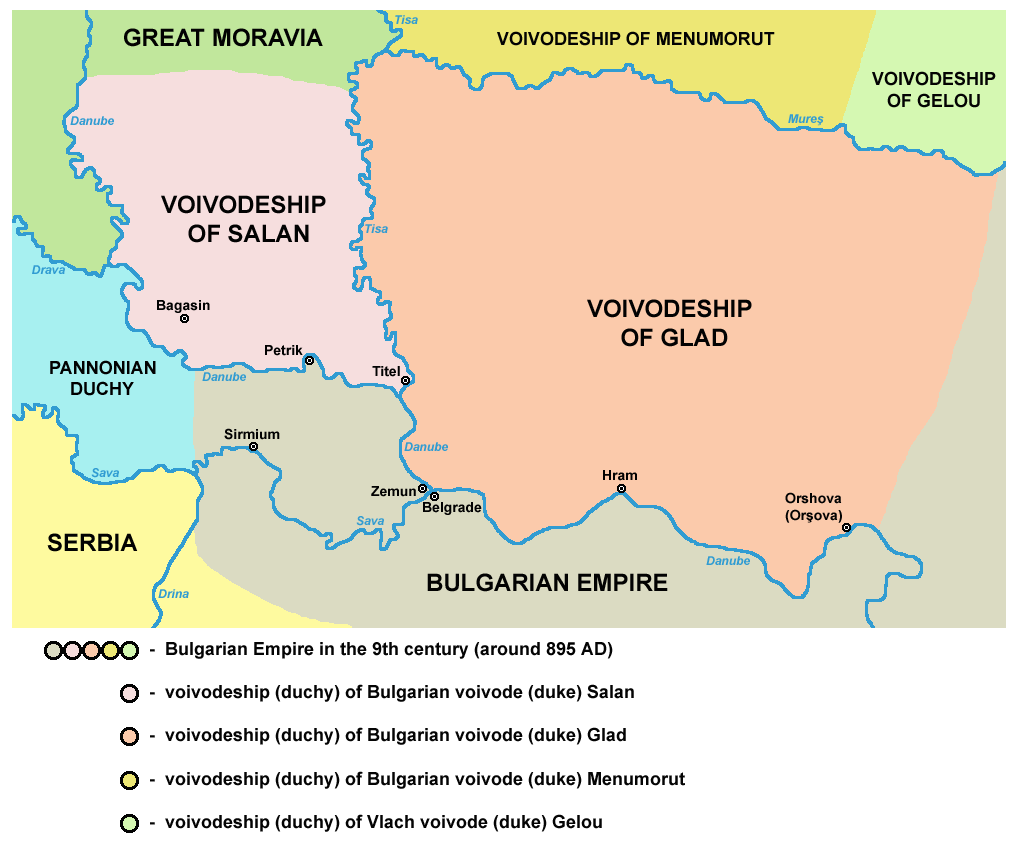
Duchy of Glad, 9th century

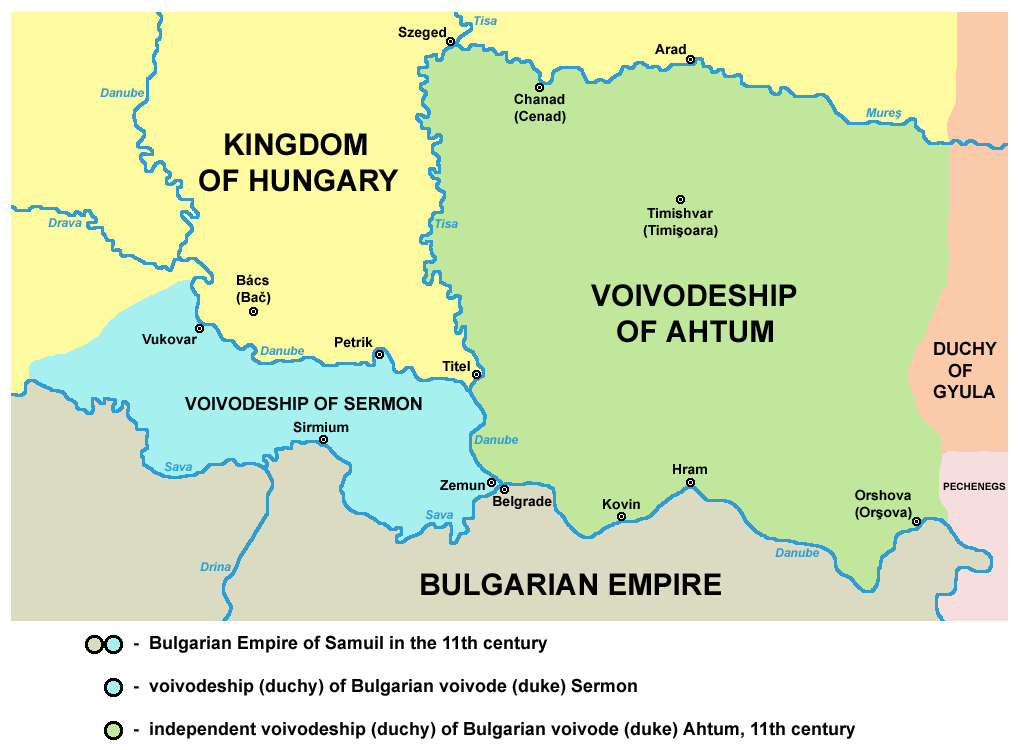
Duchy of Ahtum, 11th century

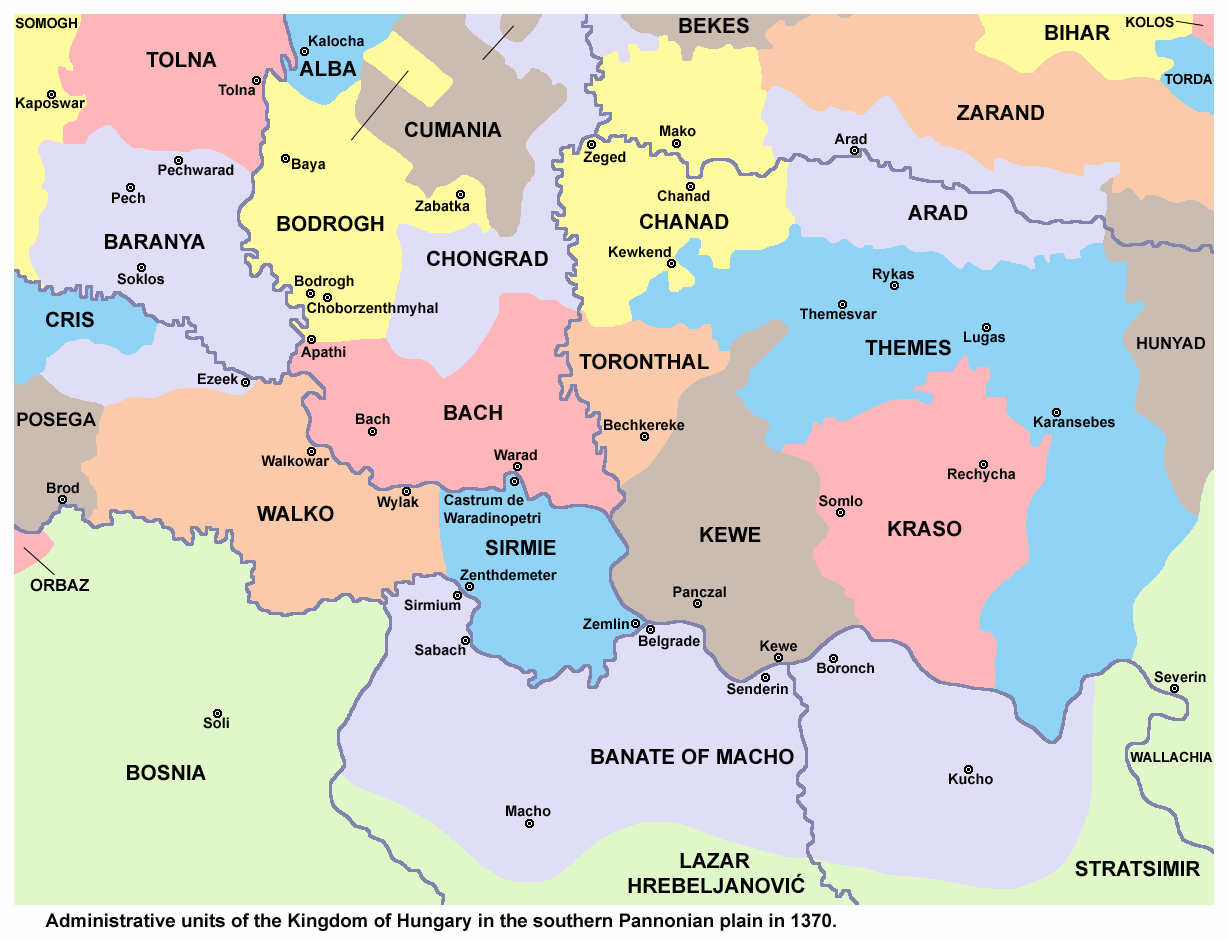
Counties of the Kingdom of Hungary in present-day Banat in the 14th century

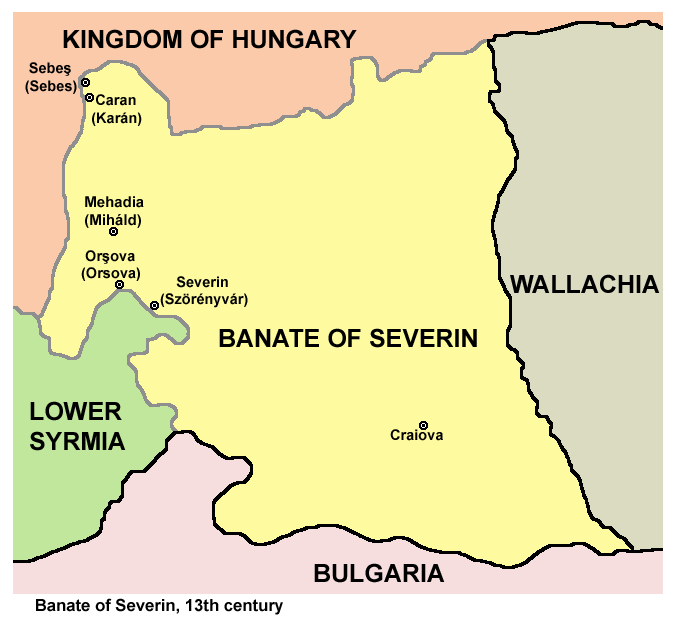
Banate of Severin

=== Ottoman rule (1552–1716) ===
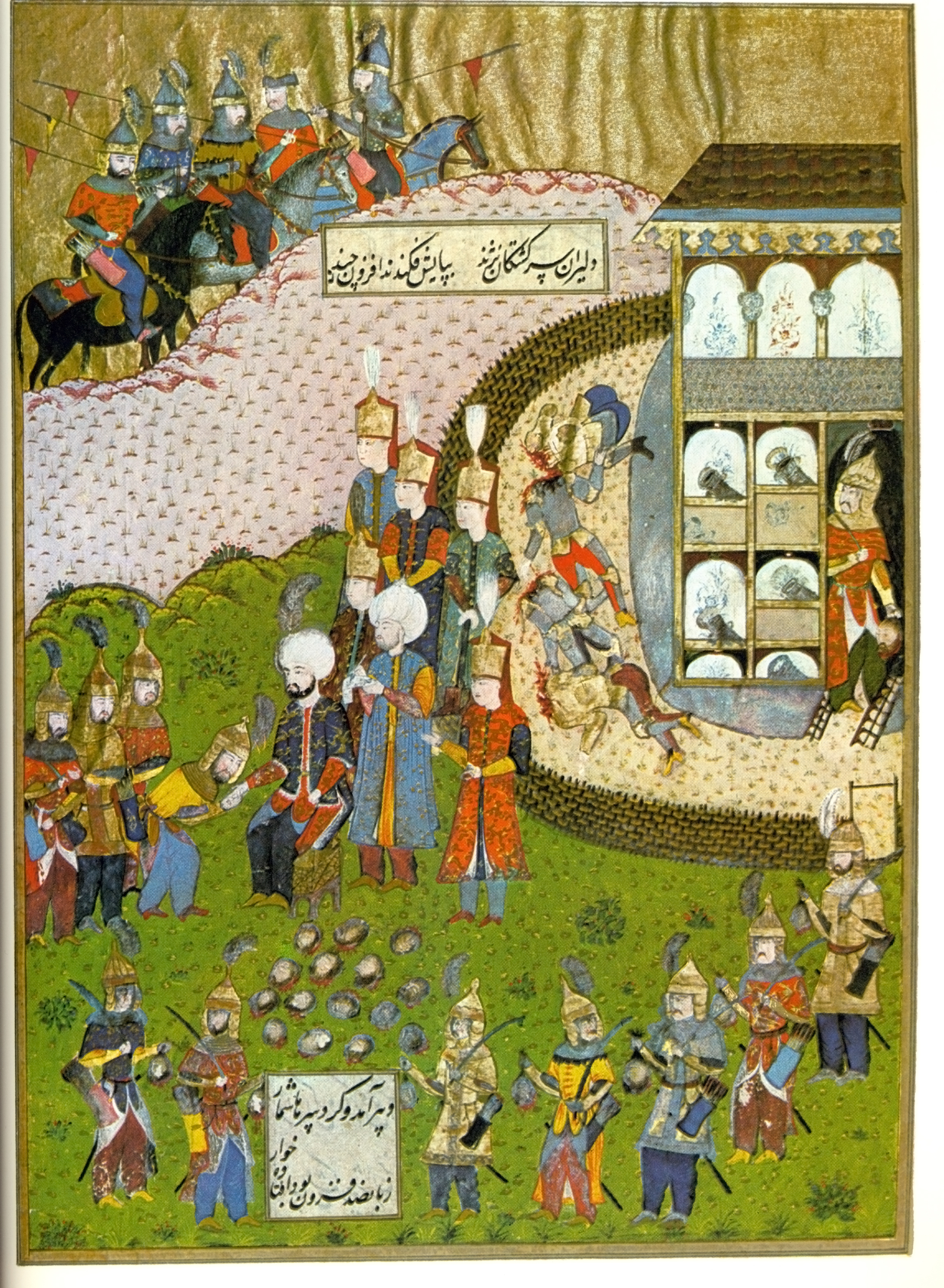
After the capture of Temesvár, 1552

The Ottoman Empire took over the area in 1552 and incorporated Banat as an Ottoman eyalet (province) named the Eyalet of Temeşvar. The Banat region was mainly populated by Rascians (Serbs) in the west and Vlachs (Romanians) in the east. Thus, in some historical sources, the region of Banat was referred to as Rascia, while in others as Wallachia. Numerous Ottoman Muslims from the Balkans settled in the area, living mostly in the cities and associated with trade and administration.

Not all of Banat fell immediately under Turkish rule. The eastern regions around Lugoj and Caransebeș came under the rule of Princes of Transylvania. In that area, a new banate was formed, known as the Banate of Lugoj and Caransebeș.

In the spring of 1594, shortly after the beginning of the Austro-Turkish War (1593–1606), local Serb Christians in the Eyalet of Temeşvar began an uprising against Turkish rule. The local Romanians also participated in this uprising. At first, rebels were successful. They took the city of Vršac and various other towns in Banat and started negotiations with Prince of Transylvania. One of the leaders of the uprising was local Serbian Orthodox Bishop Theodore.

In the middle of the 17th century, the territory of the Banate of Lugoj and Caransebeș finally fell under Turkish rule and was incorporated into Eyalet of Temeşvar.

During the Austro-Turkish War (1683–1699), local Serb uprisings broke out in various parts of the Eyalet of Temeşvar. Austrian armies and Serbian militia tried to drive out the sultan's army from the province, but the Turks succeeded in holding the fort of Temesvár. In 1689, Serbian patriarch Arsenije III sided with the Austrians. His jurisdiction (including the province) was officially recognized by the charters of Emperor Leopold I in 1690, 1691 and 1695. Under the Treaty of Karlowitz (1699), the northern parts of the Eyalet of Temeşvar were incorporated into the Habsburg monarchy, but the territory of Banat remained under Turkish rule.

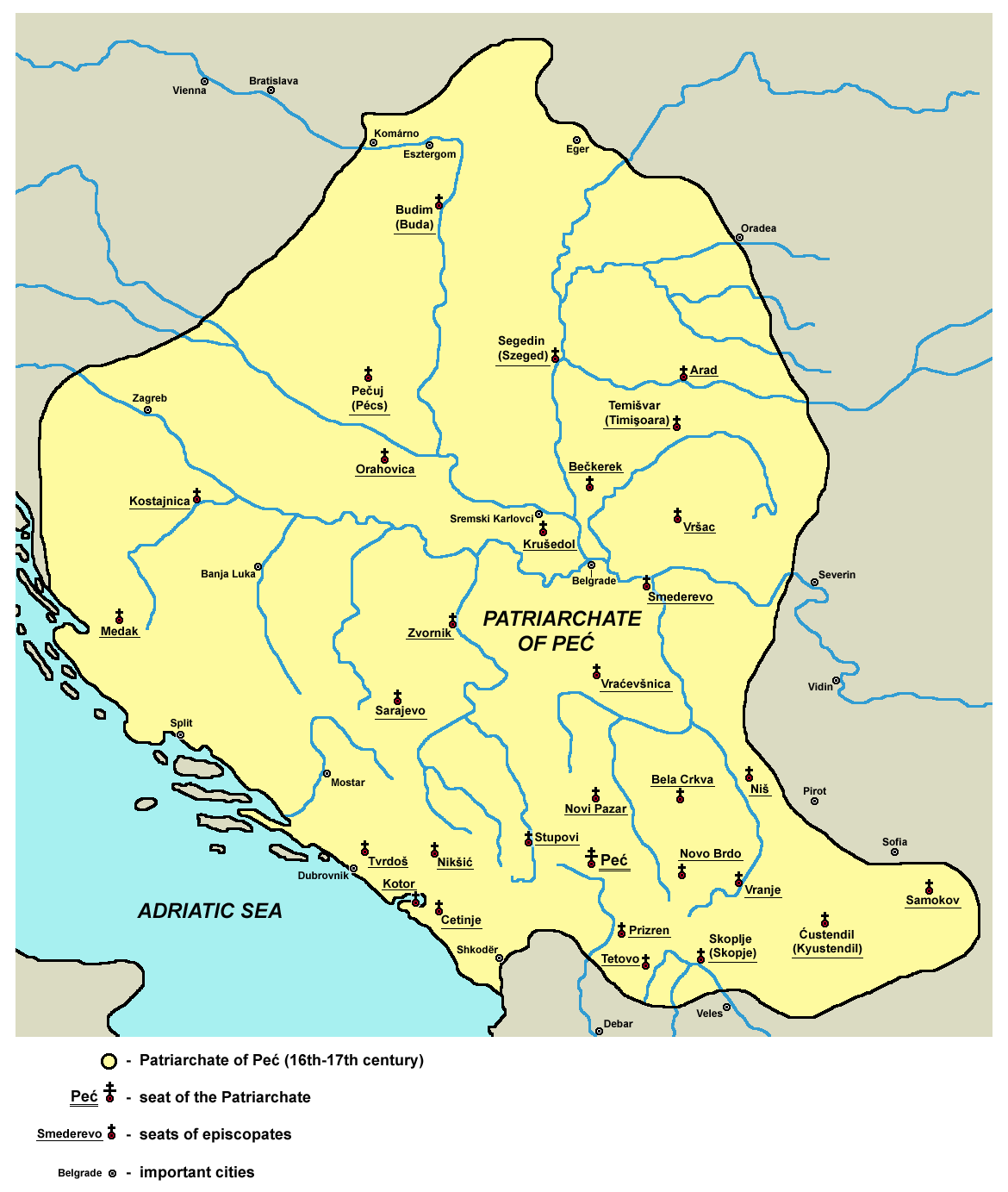
Jurisdiction of Serbian Patriarchate in the 16th and 17th centuries

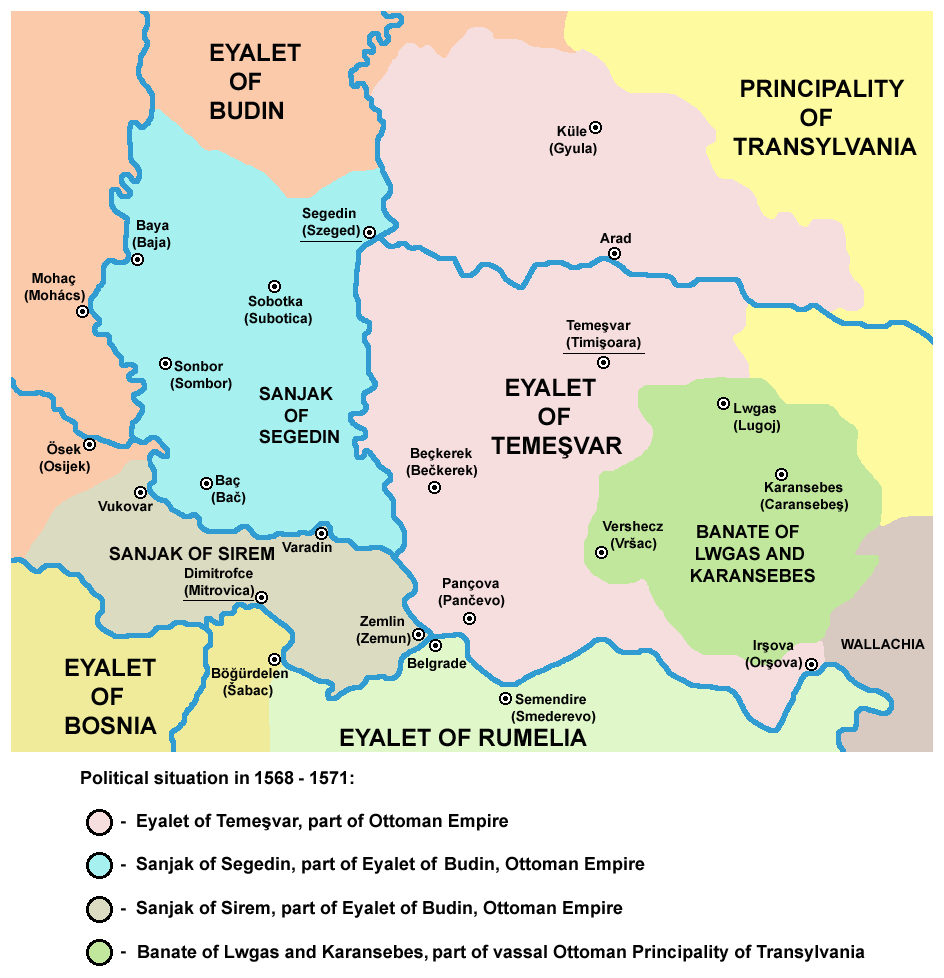
Eyalet of Temeşvar and Banate of Lugoj and Caransebeș in 1568

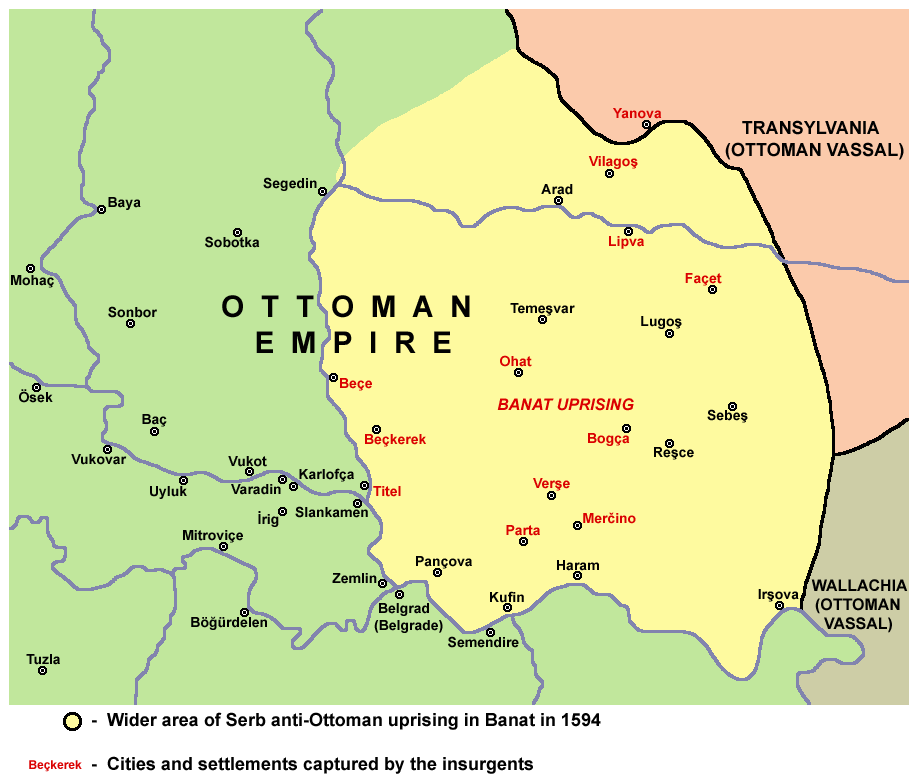
Uprising in Banat in 1594

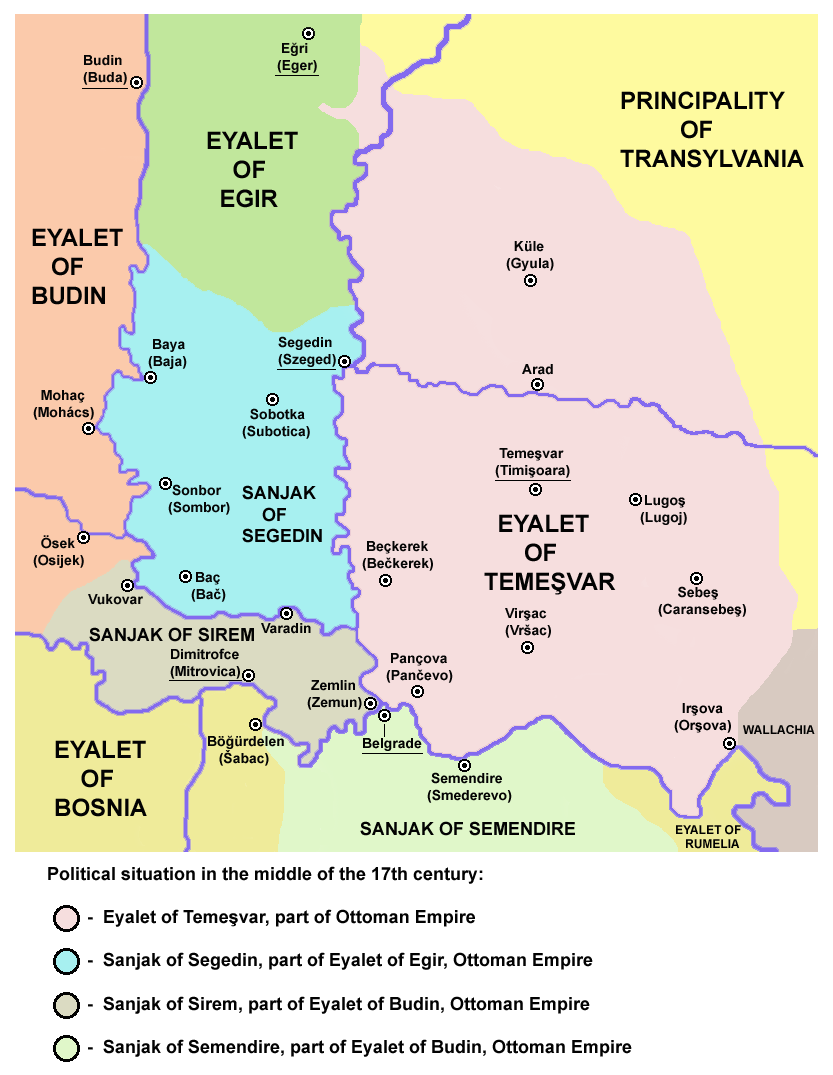
Eyalet of Temeşvar in the mid-17th century

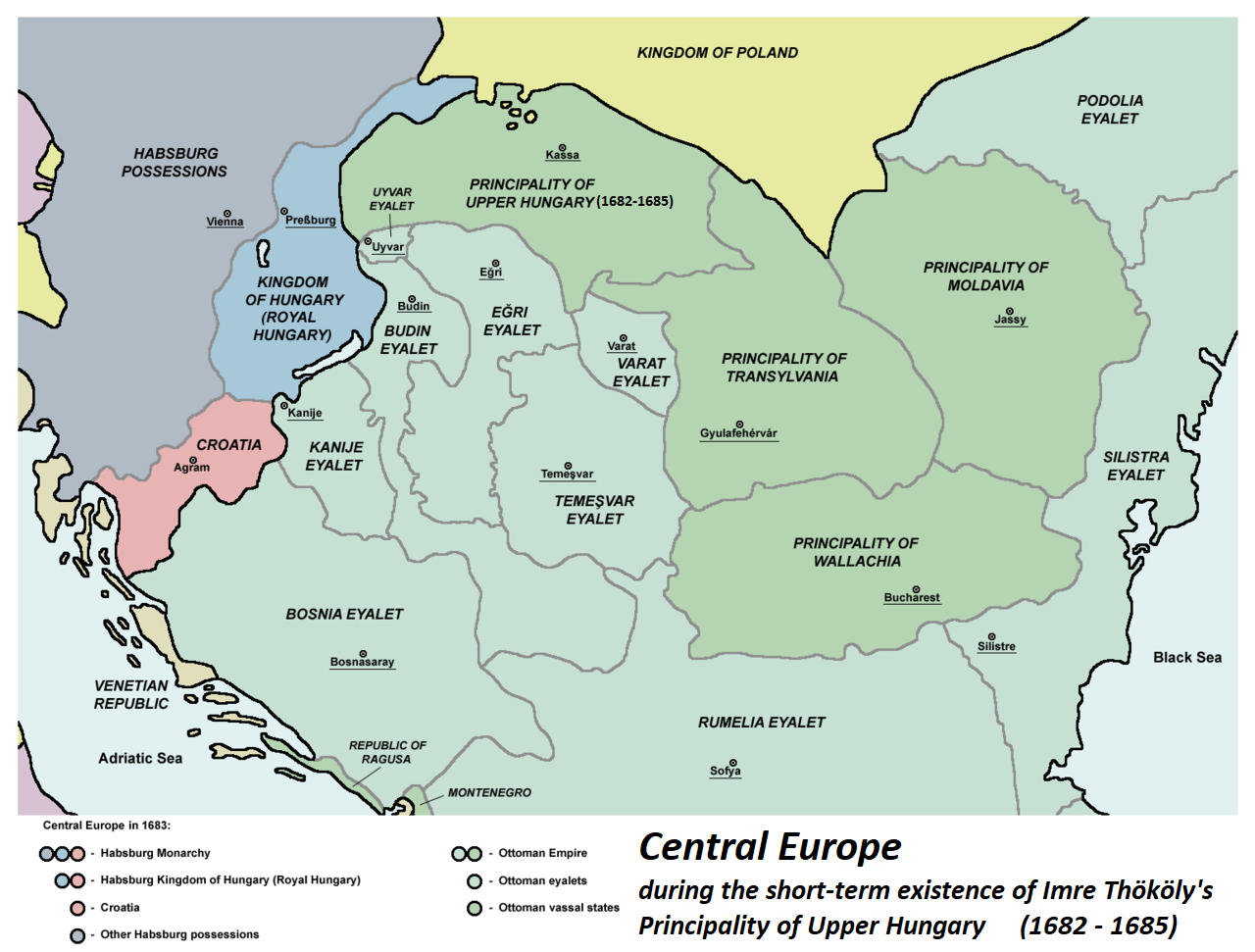
Eyalet of Temeşvar and the surrounding regions in 1683

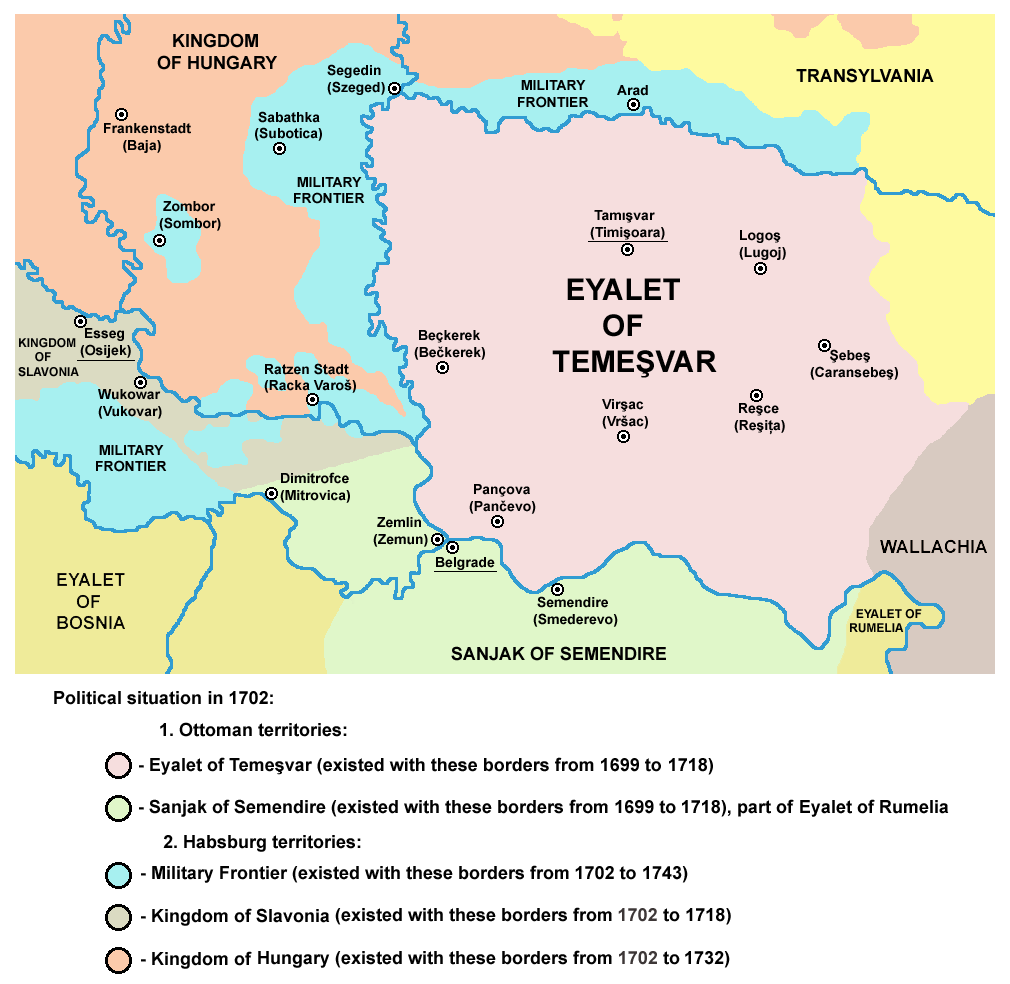
Eyalet of Temeşvar, from 1699 to 1716

=== Habsburg rule (1716–1867) ===
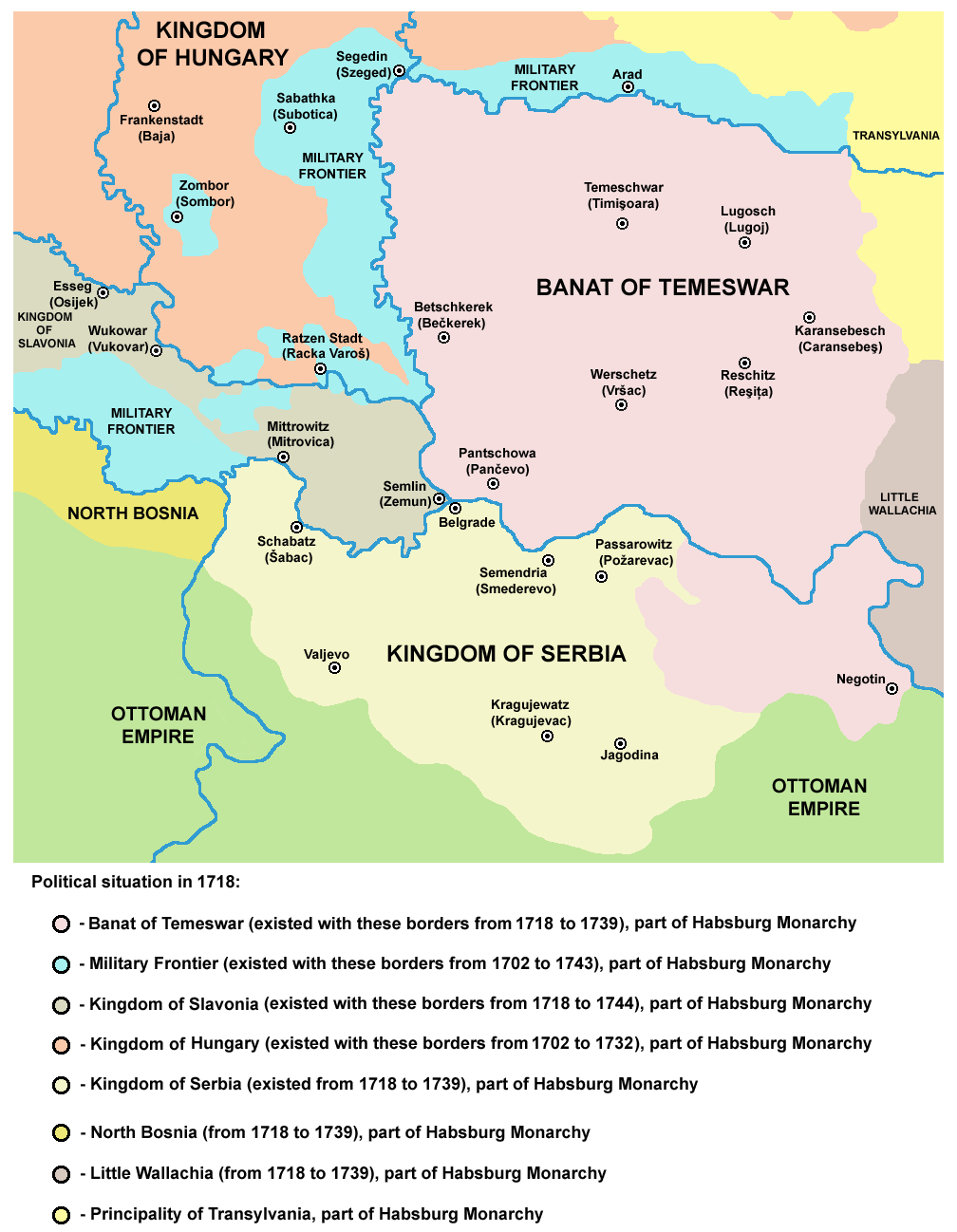
Banat of Temeswar, province of the Habsburg monarchy in 1718–1739

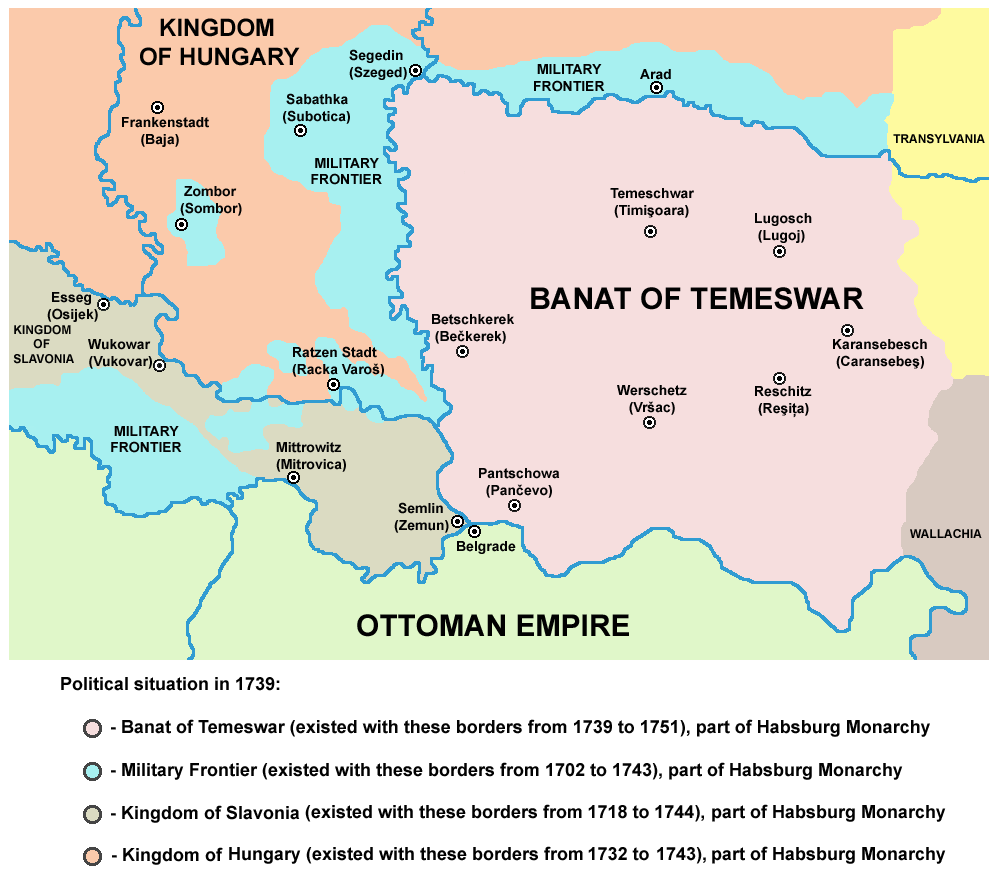
Banat of Temeswar, province of the Habsburg monarchy in 1739–1751

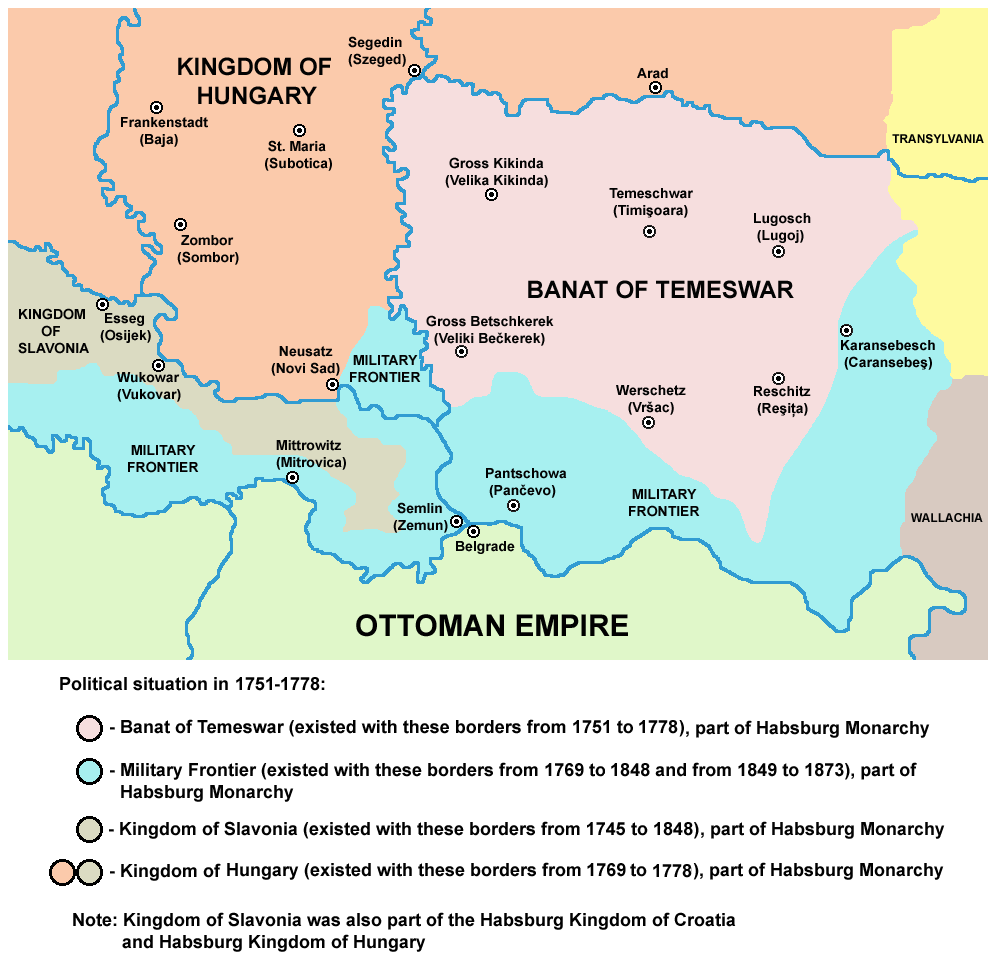
Banat of Temeswar, province of the Habsburg monarchy in 1751–1778

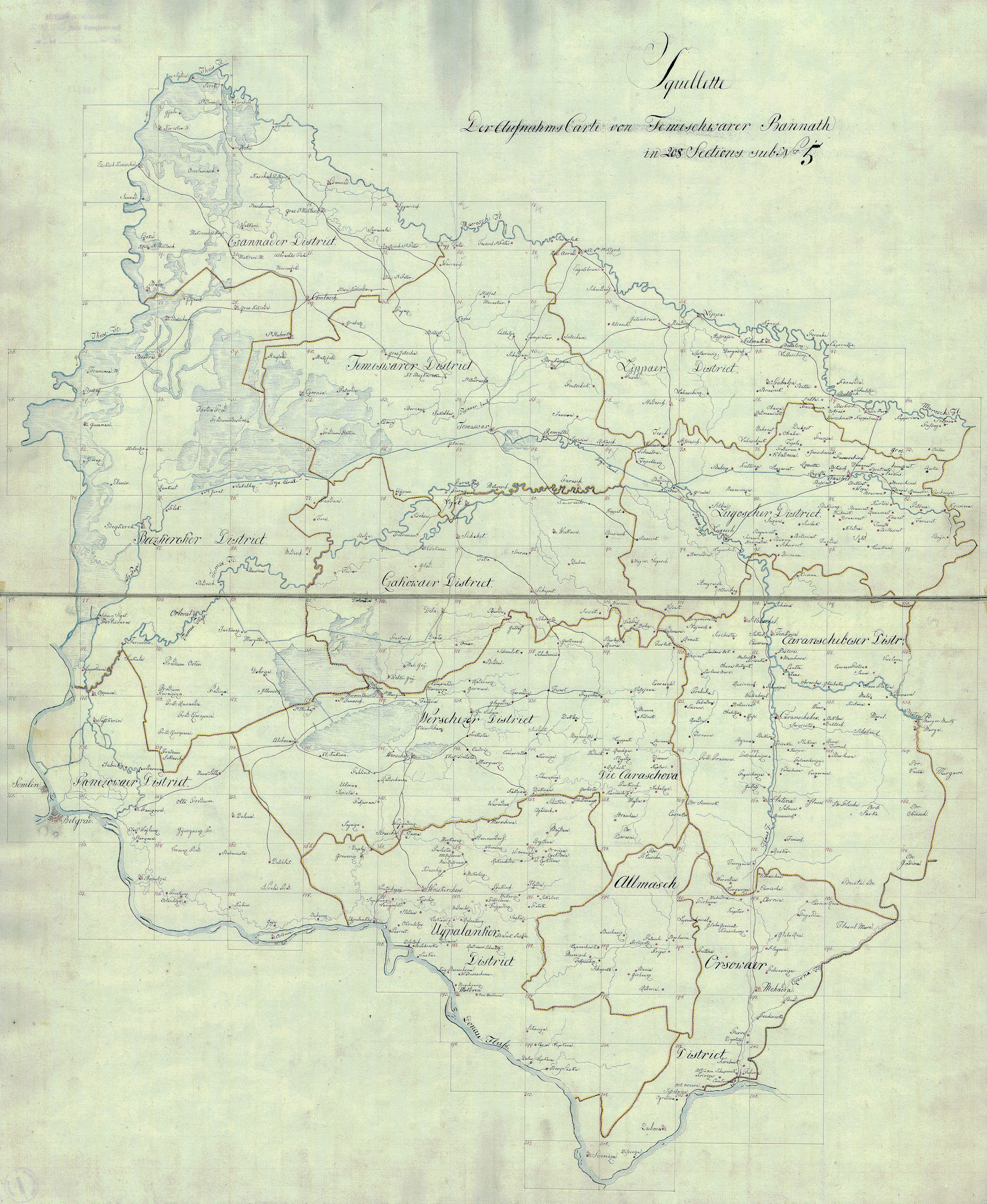
Banat region in the cadastral map of the 1769–1772 census

At the beginning of the next Austro-Turkish War (1716–1718), Prince Eugene of Savoy took the Banat region from the Turks. After the Treaty of Passarowitz (1718), the region became a province of the Habsburg Monarchy but was not incorporated into the Kingdom of Hungary. Instead, a special provincial administration was established with its center in Temesvár.

In 1738, over 50 Romanian villages from Serbia and Banat were destroyed and their inhabitants murdered by Austrians and Serb militia during a revolt of Romanians. The governor of the province was not given the title of "ban", the region became known as the Banate of Temes or Banat of Temeswar. It remained a separate province within the Habsburg monarchy and under military administration until 1751, when Empress Maria Theresa of Austria reorganized the province, dividing it between military and civil administration. The Banat of Temeswar was abolished as a province in 1778, when the civilian part of the region was incorporated into the Kingdom of Hungary and divided into counties. The southern part of the Banat region remained within the Military Frontier (Banat Krajina) until the Frontier was abolished in 1871.

During Ottoman rule, parts of Banat had a low population density due to years of warfare, and some local residents also died during the Habsburg-Ottoman wars and Prince Eugene of Savoy's conquest. Much of the area had reverted to nearly uninhabited marsh, heath and forest. Count Claudius Mercy (1666–1734), who was appointed governor of the Banat of Temeswar in 1720, took numerous measures for the regeneration of Banat. He recruited German artisans and especially farmers from Bavaria and other southern areas as colonists, allowing them privileges such as keeping their language and religion in their settlements. Farmers brought their families and belongings on rafts down the Danube River and were encouraged to re-establish agriculture and commerce in the area. They cleared the marshes near the Danube and Tisa rivers and helped build roads and canals.

Maria Theresa also took a direct interest in Banat; she colonized the region with large numbers of German farmers, who were admired for their agricultural skills. She encouraged the exploitation of the mineral wealth of the country, and generally developed the measures that were introduced by Count Mercy. German settlers arrived from Swabia, Alsace and Bavaria, as did German-speaking colonists from Austria. Many settlements in the eastern Banat were developed by Germans and had ethnic-German majorities. The ethnic Germans in the Banat region became known as the Danube Swabians, or Donauschwaben. After years of separation from their original German provinces, their language was markedly different, preserving historic characteristics.

Similarly, a minority coming from French-speaking or linguistically mixed communes in Lorraine maintained the French language for several generations, and developed a specific ethnic identity, later known as Banat French, Français du Banat.

In 1779, the Banat region was incorporated into the Habsburg Kingdom of Hungary, and the three counties of Torontal, Temes and Karasch were created. In 1848, after the May Assembly, the western Banat became part of the Serbian Vojvodina, a Serbian autonomous region within the Habsburg Monarchy. During the Revolutions of 1848–1849, Banat was respectively held by Serbian and Hungarian troops.

After the Revolution of 1848–1849, Banat (together with Syrmia and Bačka) was designated as a separate Austrian crownland known as the Voivodeship of Serbia and Temes Banat. In 1860 this province was abolished and most of its territory was incorporated into the Habsburg Kingdom of Hungary.

Serbian Banat (western Banat) was part of Serbian Vojvodina (1848–1849) and part of the Voivodeship of Serbia and Temes Banat (1849–1860). After 1860, Serbian Banat was part of Torontal and Temes counties of Habsburg Kingdom of Hungary. The center of Torontal county was Großbetschkerek (Hungarian: Nagybecskerek, Serbian: Veliki Bečkerek), the current Zrenjanin.

=== Hungarian rule (1867–1918) ===
In 1867, after the Austro-Hungarian compromise, the territory returned again to Hungarian administration. After 1871, the former Military Frontier, located in the southern parts of Banat, came under civil administration and was incorporated into Banat's counties. Krassó and Szörény were united into Krassó-Szörény in 1881.

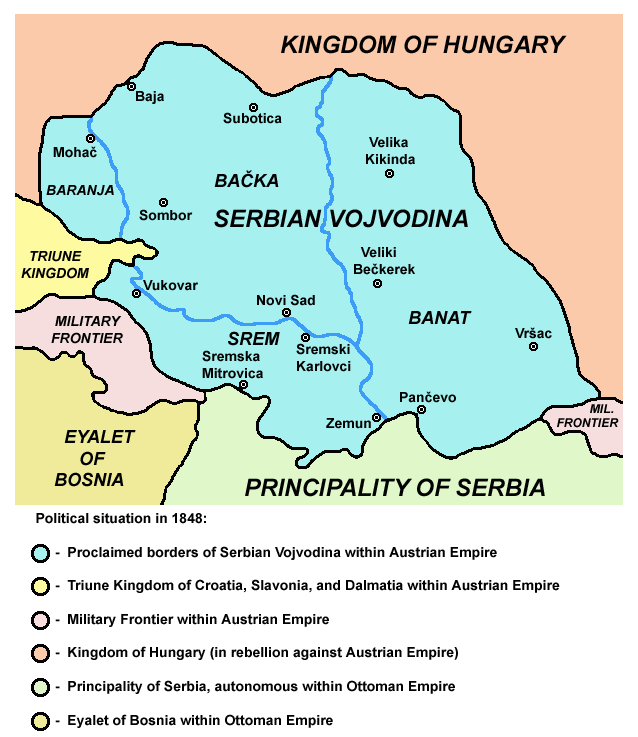
Proclaimed borders of Serbian Vojvodina in 1848 (including Western Banat)

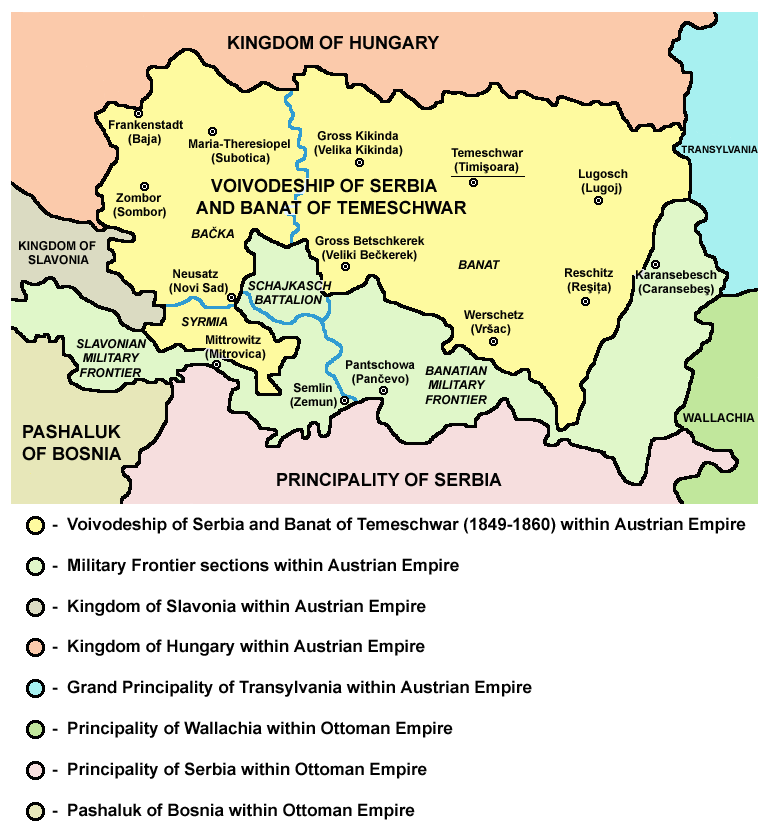
Voivodeship of Serbia and Temes Banat (1849–1860)

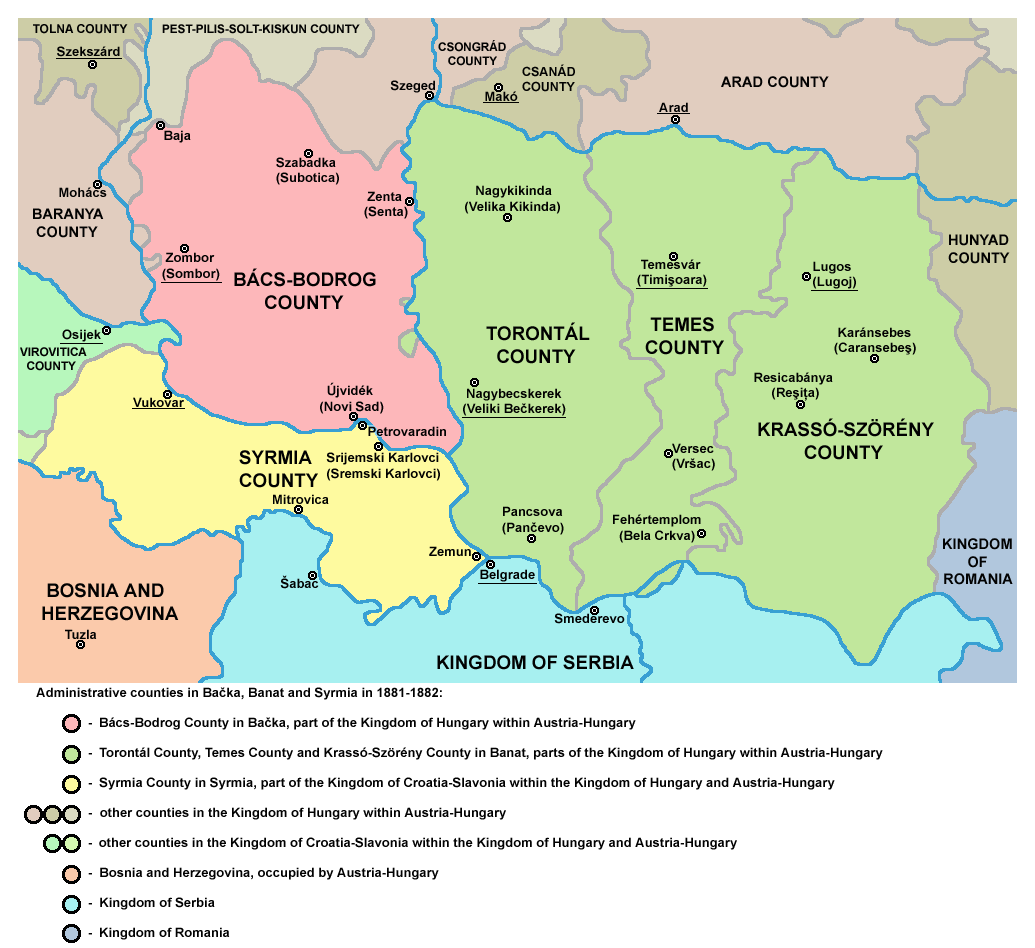
Counties in Banat, Bačka and Syrmia from 1881 to 1918

=== The Banat Question at the end of World War I ===
In 1918, the Banat Republic was proclaimed in Timișoara in October, and the government of Hungary recognized its independence. However, the republic was short-lived. After just two weeks, Serbian troops invaded the region and took control. From November 1918 to March 1919, the western and central parts of Banat were governed by Serbian administration from Novi Sad as part of the Banat, Bačka and Baranja province of the Kingdom of Serbia and the newly formed Kingdom of Serbs, Croats and Slovenes (which was later renamed as Yugoslavia).

On July 26, 1919, in the wake of the Declaration of Union of Transylvania with Romania on December 1, 1918, and the Declaration of Unification of Banat, Bačka and Baranja with Serbia on November 25, 1918, most of Banat was divided between Romania (Krassó-Szörény completely, two-thirds of Temes, and a small part of Torontál) and the Kingdom of Serbs, Croats, and Slovenes (most of Torontál, and one-third of Temes). A small area near Szeged was assigned to the newly independent Hungary. These borders were confirmed by the 1919 Treaty of Versailles and the 1920 Treaty of Trianon.

At the dissolution of Austria-Hungary, the delegates of the Romanian and some German communities voted for union with Romania during the Great National Assembly of Alba Iulia; the delegates of the Serbian, Bunjevac and other Slavic and non-Slavic communities (including some Germans) voted for union with Serbia during the Great People's Assembly of Serbs, Bunjevci and other Slavs in Banat, Bačka and Baranja; meanwhile, the Hungarian minority remained loyal to the government in Budapest. Besides these declarations, no other plebiscite was held.

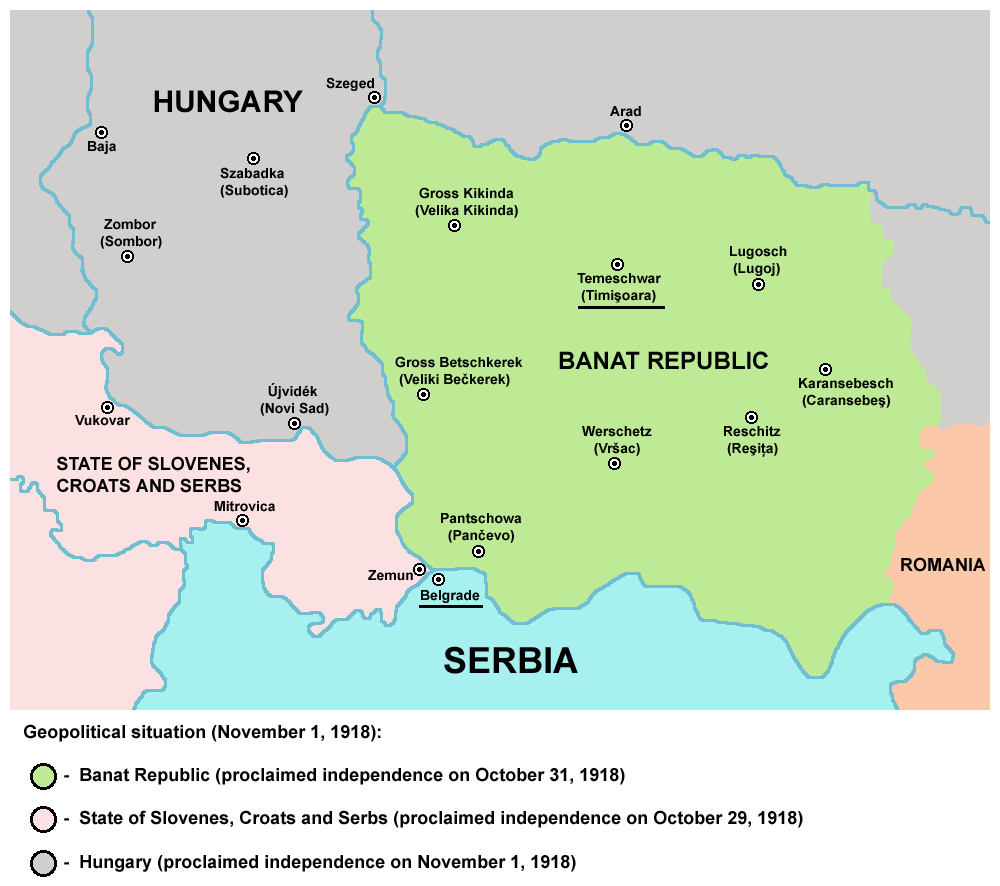
Self-proclaimed Banat Republic in 1918

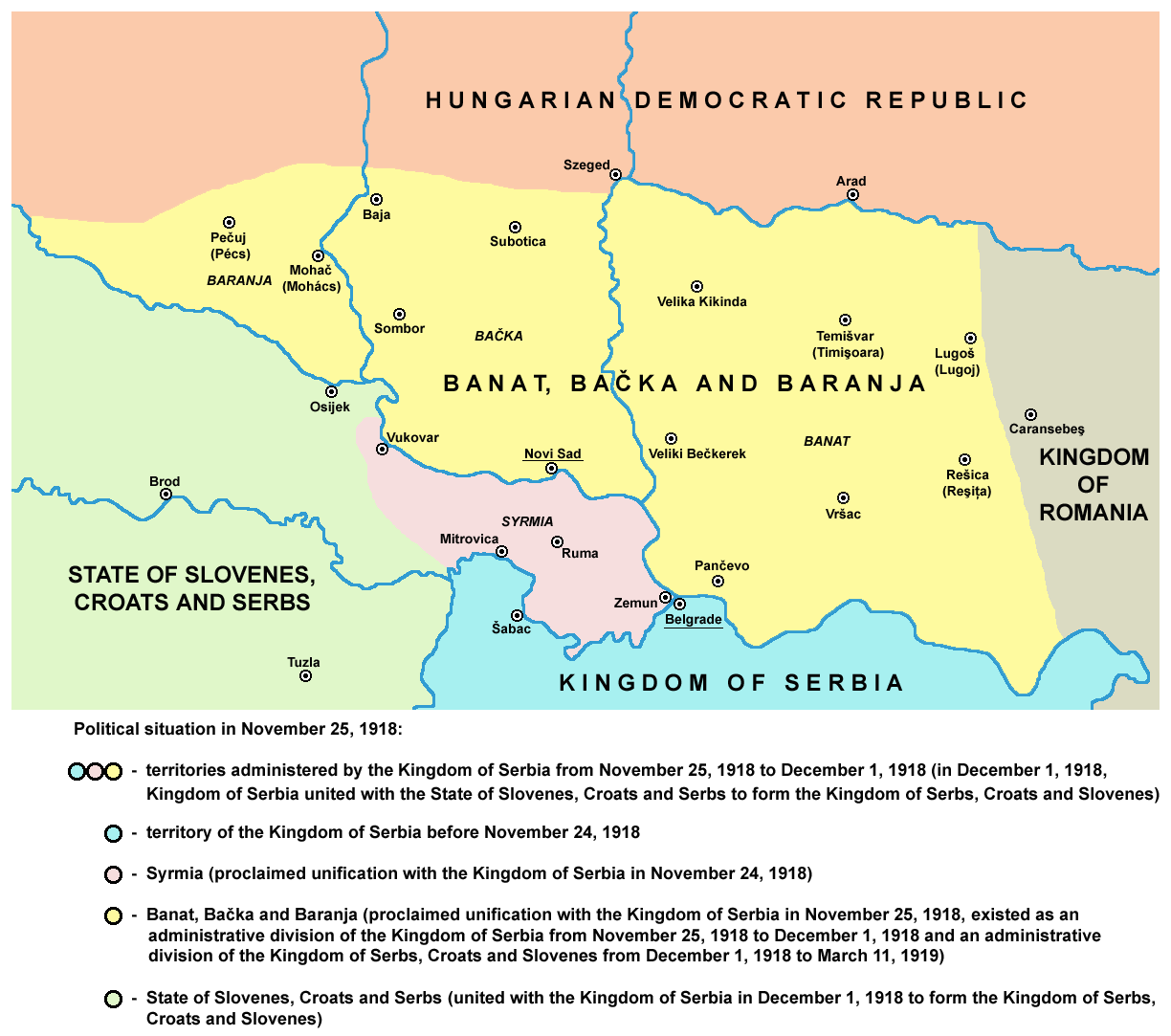
Situation around Banat in 1918

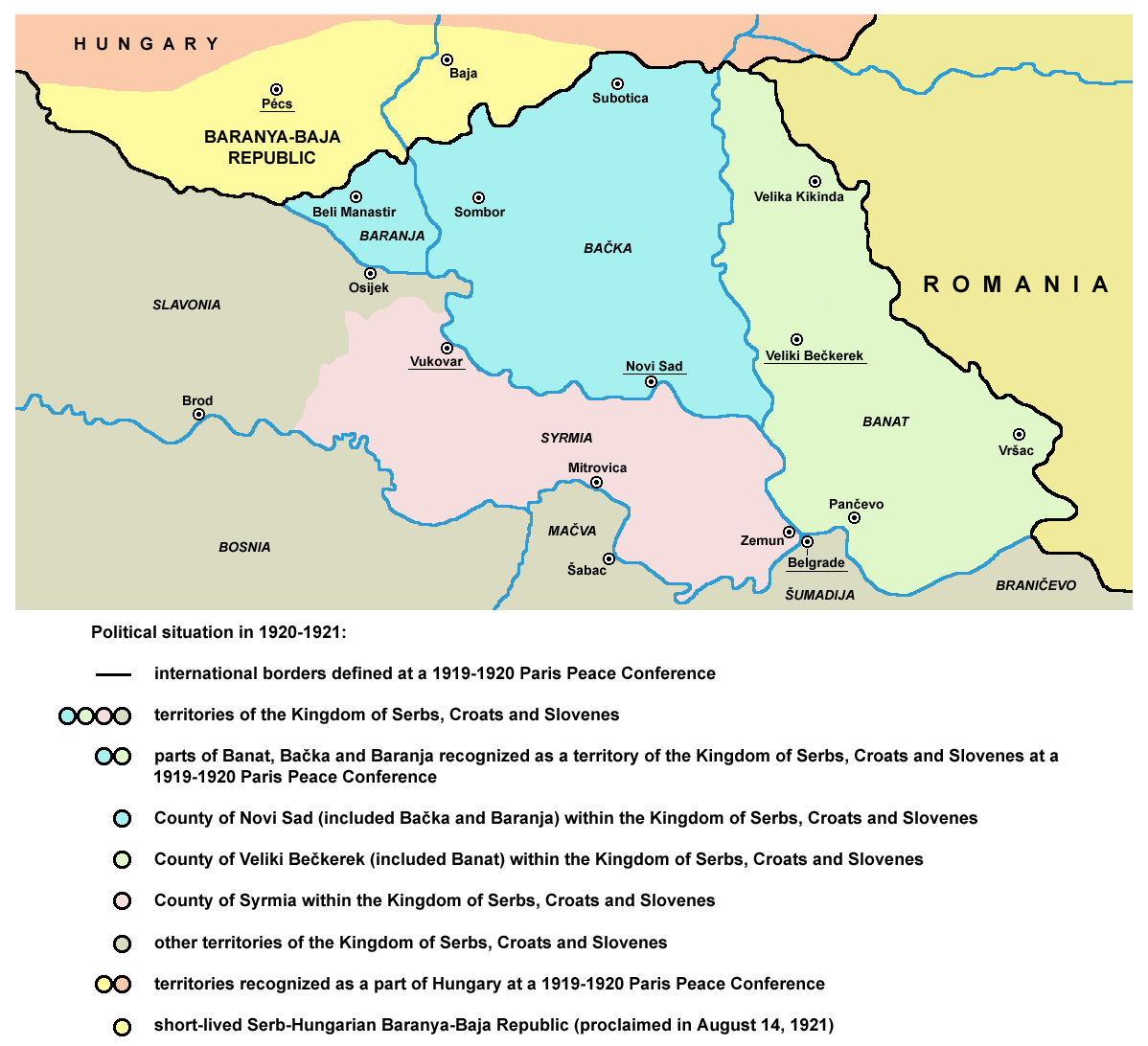
Situation around Banat in 1919–1921

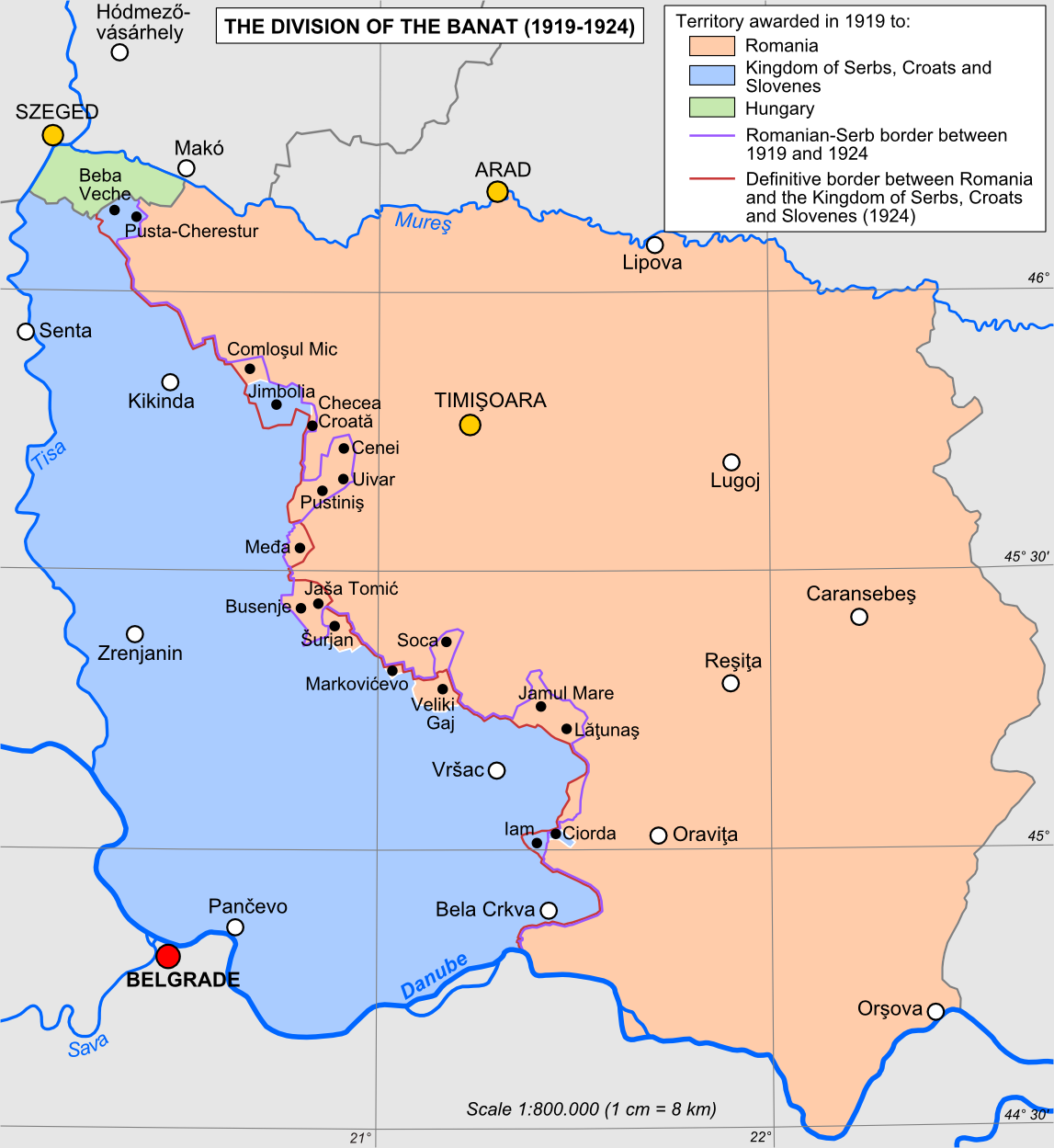
Division of Banat in 1919–1923

=== Romanian Banat since World War I ===
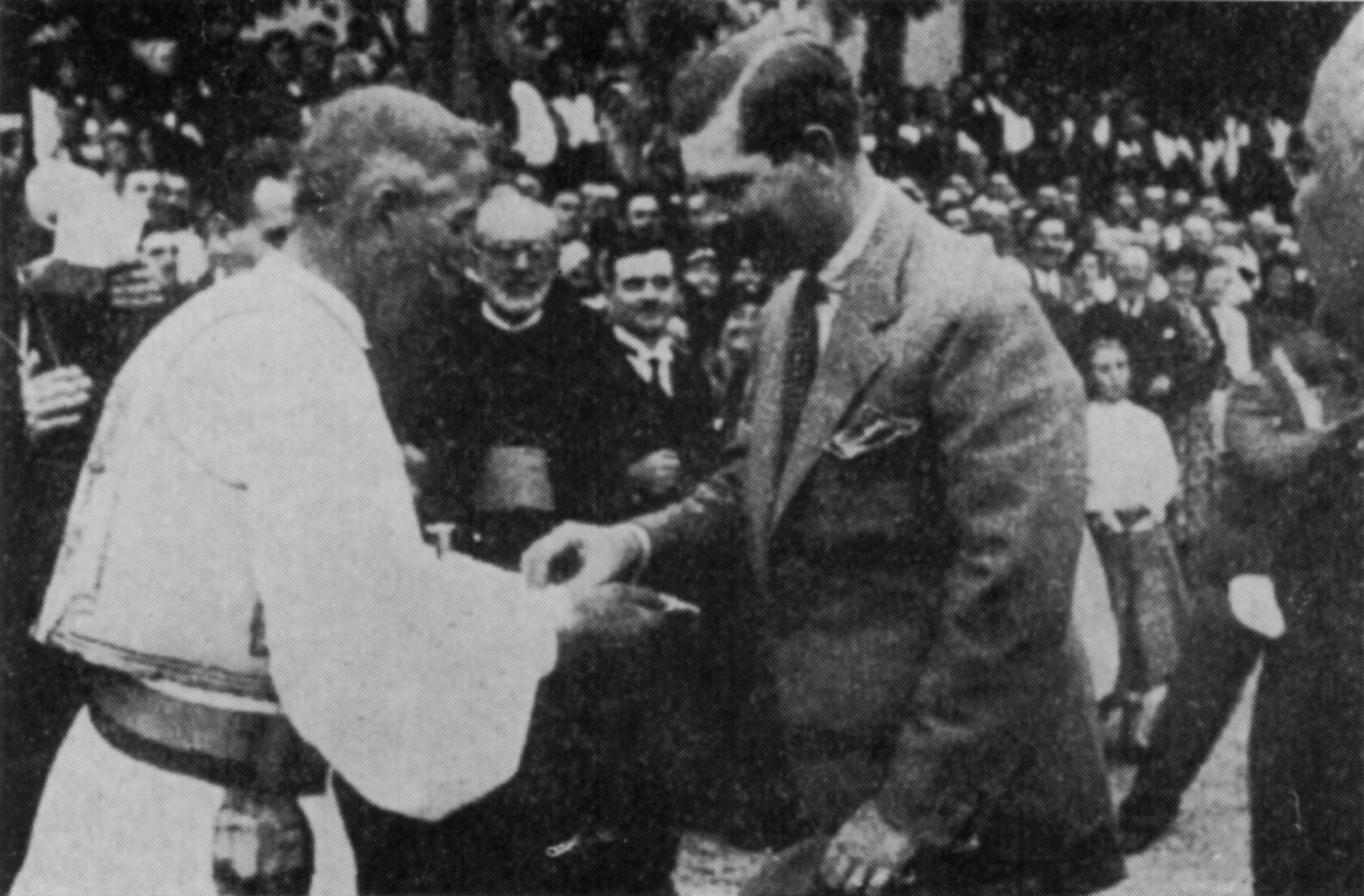
Romanian king Carol II visits a village in the Romanian Banat, 1934.

Map of Romania with Romanian Banat highlighted (in dark orange)

In 1938, the counties of Timiș-Torontal, Caraș, Severin, Arad and Hunedoara were joined to form ținutul Timiș, which roughly encompassed the area typically called Banat in Romania.

On 6 September 1950, the province was replaced by the Timișoara Region (formed by the present-day counties of Timiș and Caraș-Severin). In 1956, the southern half of the existing Arad Region was incorporated into the Timișoara Region. In December 1960, the Timișoara Region was renamed the Banat Region.

On 17 February 1968, a new territorial division was made and today's Timiș, Caraș-Severin and Arad counties were formed.

Since 1998, Romania has been divided into eight development regions, acting as divisions that coordinate and implement regional development. The Vest development region is composed of four counties: Arad, Timiș, Hunedoara and Caraș-Severin; thus it has almost the same borders as the Timiș Province (ținutul Timiș) of 1938. The Vest development region is also a part of the Danube-Criș-Mureș-Tisa Euroregion.

=== Serbian Banat since World War I ===
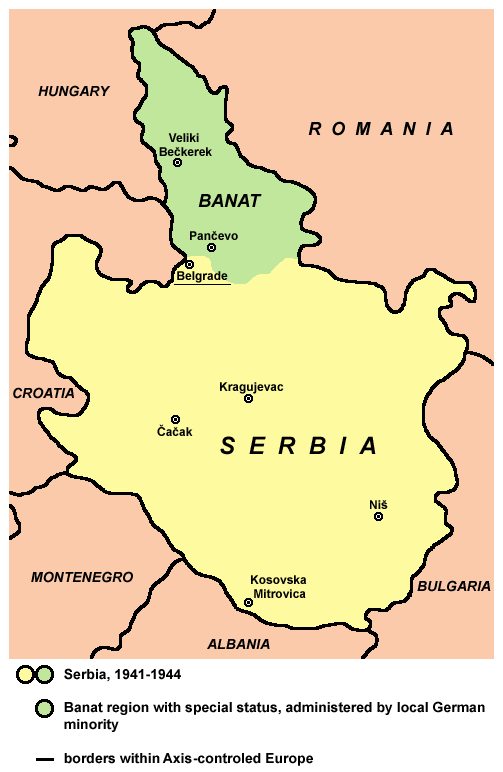
Serbia and Banat under Nazi occupation 1941–1944

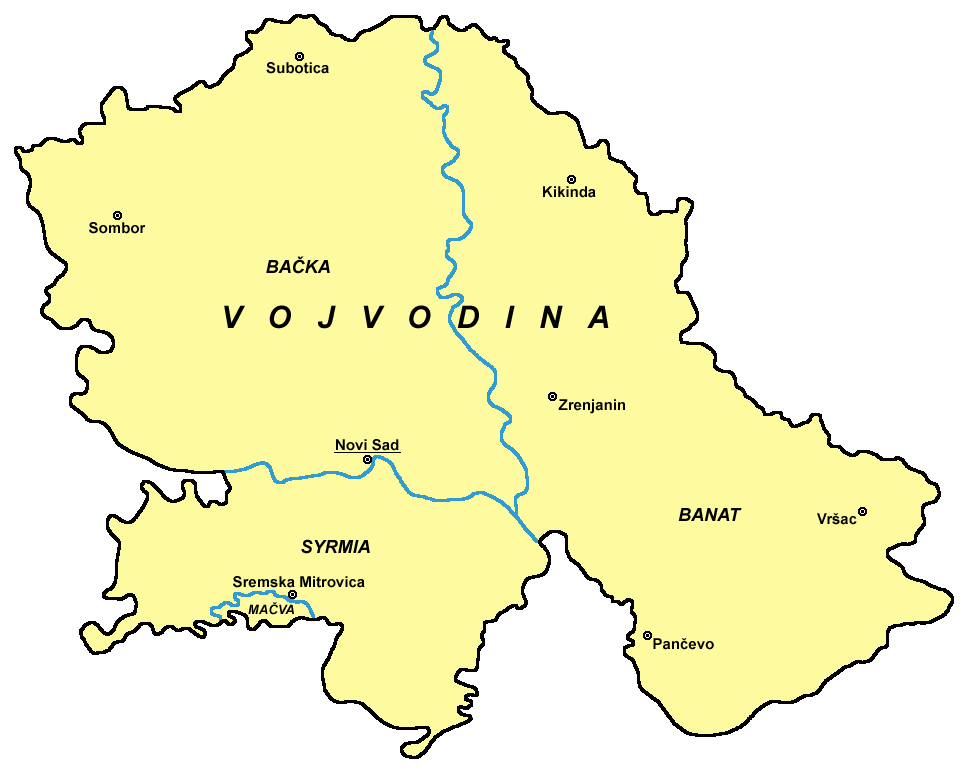
Serbian Banat within Vojvodina

The region was claimed by the Kingdom of Serbs, Croats, and Slovenes between 1918 and 1922 (as the province of Banat, Bačka and Baranja between 1918 and 1919), and from 1922 to 1929 it was divided between Belgrade oblast and Podunavlje oblast. In 1929, most of the region was incorporated into the Danube Banovina (Danubian Banat), a province of the Kingdom of Yugoslavia, while the city of Pančevo was incorporated into self-governed Belgrade district.

During World War II, the Axis Powers occupied this area and partitioned it. Nazi Germany had been intent on expanding into eastern Europe to incorporate what it called the Volksdeutsche, people of ethnic German descent. They established the political entity known as Banat in 1941. It included only the western part of the historical Banat region, which was formerly part of Yugoslavia. It was formally under the control of the Serbian puppet Government of National Salvation in Belgrade led by Milan Nedić. It theoretically had limited jurisdiction over all of the territory under German Military Administration in Serbia, but in practice the local minority of ethnic Germans (Danube Swabians or Schwowe) held the political power within Banat. The regional civilian commissioner was Josef Lapp. The head of the ethnic German group was Sepp Janko. Following the ouster of Axis forces in 1944, this German-ruled region was dissolved. As a consequence, many of the local Germans fled from the region together with defeated German army in 1944. Most of its territory was included in the Vojvodina, one of the two autonomous provinces of Serbia within the new SFR Yugoslavia. Following World War II, most ethnic Germans were expelled from Banat and eastern Europe. Those Germans who remained in the country were sent to prison camps run by the new communist authorities. After the prison camps were dissolved (in 1948), most of the remaining German population left Serbia for economic reasons. Many went to Germany, while others emigrated to western Europe and the United States.

Since 1944–1945, Serbian Banat (together with Bačka and Syrmia) has been part of the province of Vojvodina, first as part of the Socialist Federal Republic of Yugoslavia, then as part of the Serbia and Montenegro, and since 2006 as part of Serbia.

=== Hungarian Banat since World War I ===
Hungarian Banat consists of a small northern part of the region, which is part of the Csongrád-Csanád County of Hungary and is made up of seven villages and the district of Szeged, Újszeged. The Hungarian part of Banat used to be the northernmost region of the Torontál County in the Kingdom of Hungary.

== Geography ==
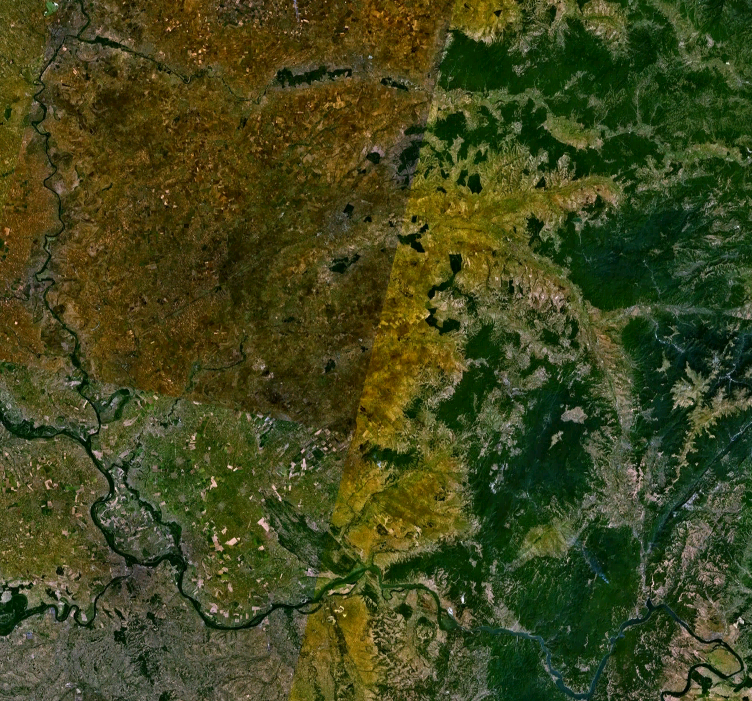
Banat as seen from NASA's Landsat 7 satellite

Banat is defined as the part of the Pannonian Basin bordered by the Danube to the south, the Tisza to the west, the Mureș to the north and the Southern Carpathians to the east. The historical Banat totals an area of 28,526 km^{2}. Various sources indicate figures slightly different from this. When the province was divided in 1920, Romania was assigned an area of 18,966 km^{2} (approximately two thirds of the total), the Kingdom of Serbs, Croats and Slovenes 9,276 km^{2} (approximately one third of the total), and Hungary 284 km^{2} (approximately 1% of the total).

The Romanian Banat is mountainous in the south and southeast, while in the north, west and southwest it is flat and in some places marshy. Some Banat mountain massifs constitute the western branch of the Southern Carpathians, i.e., Țarcu Mountains and Cerna Mountains. The Poiana Ruscă Mountains and Banat Mountains with the Semenic, Anina, Dognecea, Almăj and Locva divisions are part of the Western Romanian Carpathians. The western pre-mountainous hills make up about a third of the historical Banat territory. Their altitude varies between 200 and 400 meters. The high plain (with altitudes of over 100 meters, up to 140 meters) is represented by the plains of Vinga, Buziaș, Gătaia and Fizeș. The plains with intermediate altitudes, between 100 and 130 meters, are the plains of Hodoni, Duboz, Tormac, Jamu Mare, Arad and Sânnicolau Mare, and the low plain (with altitudes below 100 meters) is represented by the river meadows, the floodplains before the extensive regularization works. These plains, components of the Pannonian Plain, represent another third of the Banat area. Worth mentioning are the two extinct volcanoes from Lucareț and Gătaia: Piatra Roșie (211 m) and Șumigu (200 m), respectively.

The relief of Serbian Banat is monotonous, except for a few morphological units: the Vršac Mountains, the Bela Crkva basin and the east Banat alluvium. The largest stretch of sand in Europe, today stabilized and covered with vegetation, Deliblatska Peščara, also lies in Serbian Banat.

=== Climate ===
The climate of Banat is predominantly humid subtropical (Cfa, according to Köppen classification), with a northeastward increase of continental and orographic effects (Dfb). Frequent cyclones from the Mediterranean cause positive precipitation anomalies especially in the western parts and, due to the maritime influence, winters are mild and short, but when northeastern conditions prevail, harsh frosts may occur. Mean annual temperatures range between 12 °C (with average summer temperatures above 22 °C in July) and 6 °C towards the eastern highlands. Besides, temperature inversions occur in the valleys and in the depressions of the Banat Hills, the bottom being colder than the slopes. The thermal and dynamic convection produced on the slopes causes greater cloudiness throughout the year; humidity and precipitation are higher.

=== Hydrography ===
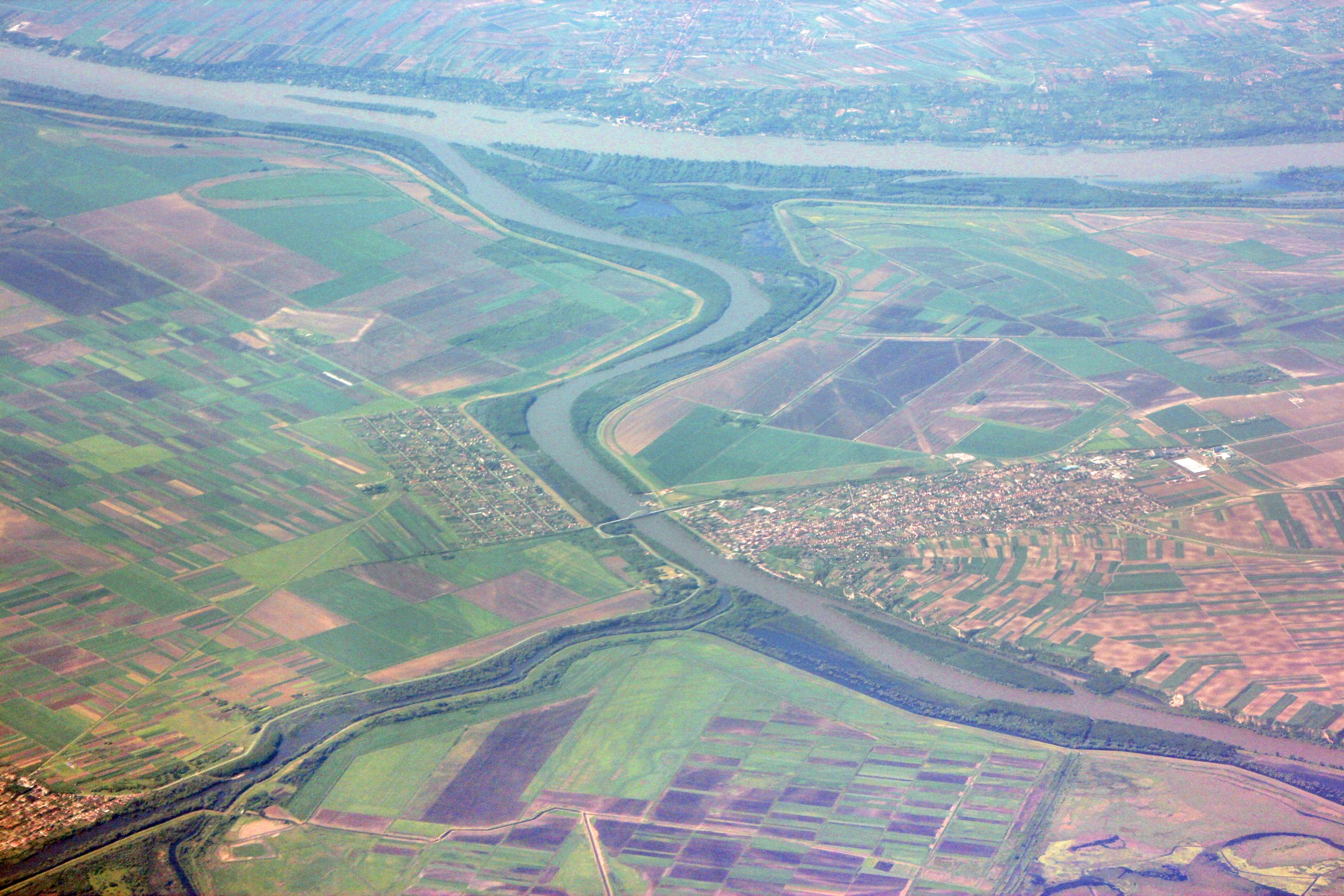
Tisza confluence with Danube at Titel

Considering the low and undesiccated land, there is a relatively large number of watercourses in Banat. The rivers bordering the area and delimiting it from the rest of the territories are Mureș, Tisza and Danube. With the exception of some small local tributaries, the Mureș does not have a very large area. The other rivers that have their source in Banat are direct or indirect tributaries of the Tisza and the Danube. The Danube forms between Baziaș and Porțile de Fier, over a distance of 140 km, the so-called Iron Gates. Tisza is the river that separates the Banat from the Hungarian areas to the west and divides the current Vojvodina into two parts. A wide river that meanders through the plain that bears its name.

The Timiș/Tamiš is the largest inland river of Banat, which has its sources on the eastern slopes of the Semenic Mountains, in Caraș-Severin County. The river is formed at the confluence of three branches: Semenic, Grădiște and Brebu. It crosses the entire Timiș County, then passes into Serbia, where it flows into the Danube, at Pančevo. The most important cities through which Timiș passes are Caransebeș, Lugoj and Pančevo.

The Bega/Begej springs from the Poiana Ruscă Mountains, crosses the area of Făget and Lugoj, passes through Timișoara, then descends through a channel, flowing into the Tisza, at Titel. Bega and Aranca/Zlatica flow into the Tisza, and Timiș with its tributaries, such as Pogăniș, Bârzava/Brzava, Caraș/Karaš and Nera, flow into the Danube.

There are no large natural lakes. In the past, there were many lakes, ponds and swamps in Banat, which were drained by land reclamation carried out at the end of the 18th century and the beginning of the 19th century. There are bigger lakes only south of Zrenjanin.

== Administrative organization ==
In Romania, Banat includes all of Timiș and Caraș-Severin counties (with the exception of Băuțar), Arad County (only the part south of the Mureș), the Mehedinți panhandle (several localities from the traditional Banat area disappeared under the waters of the Porțile de Fier reservoir) and Hunedoara County (only the villages of Pojoga and Sălciva).

The Serbian Banat includes the part located east of the Tisza in North Banat District, Central Banat District, and South Banat District, as well as the area called Pančevački Rit, which is part of the administrative area of the City of Belgrade.

In Hungary, there is only a small part of Csongrád-Csanád County, namely the part located in the southern angle formed by the Tisza and Mureș rivers, up to the state border with Romania and Serbia.

=== Largest cities ===
The following table lists the cities in Banat with a population greater than 10,000 (2022). Some cities that are not historically part of Banat expanded into this region during the 20th century, so that today some districts lie in the historical Banat: Arad (Aradu Nou), Belgrade (Palilula), and Szeged (Újszeged).

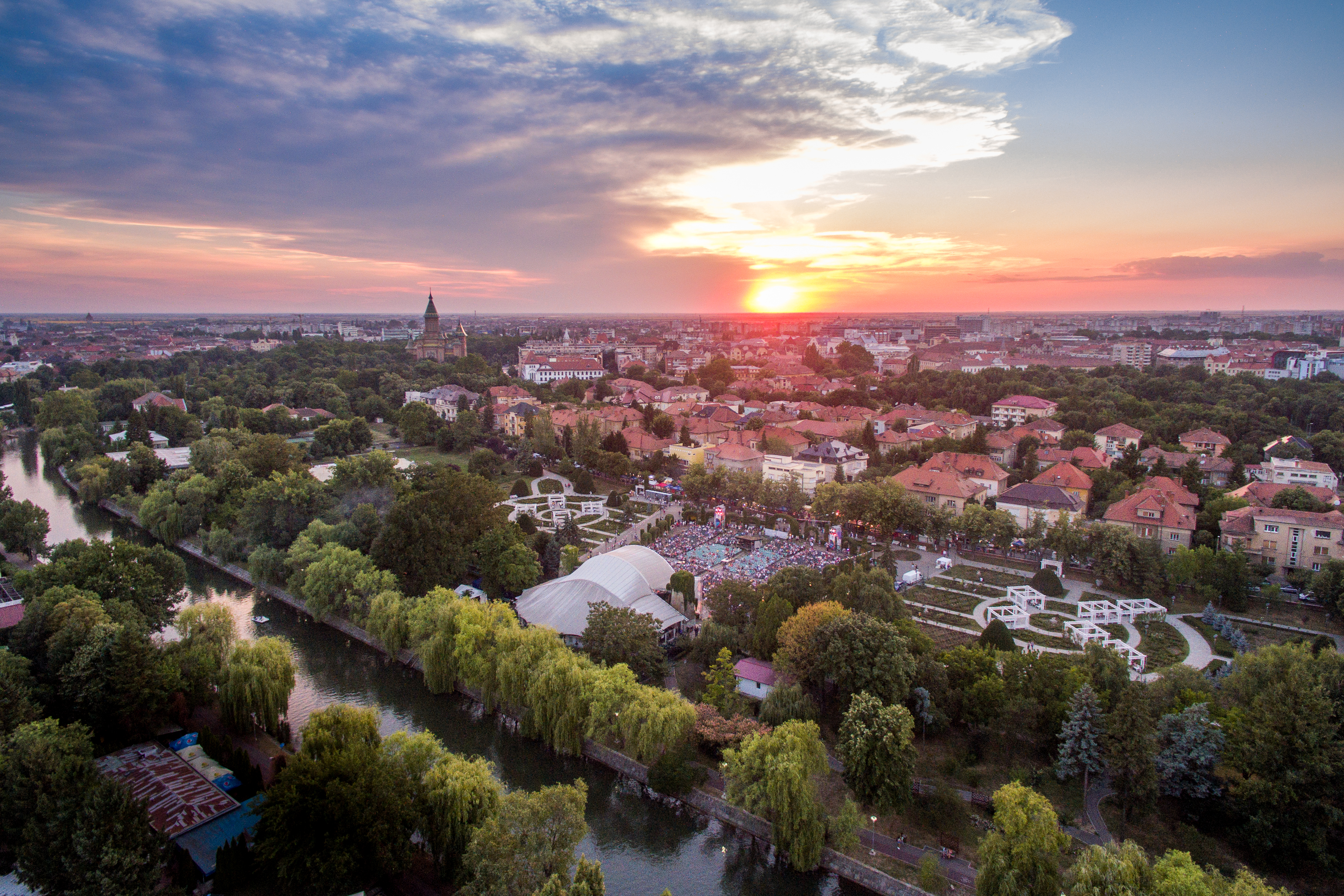
Timișoara
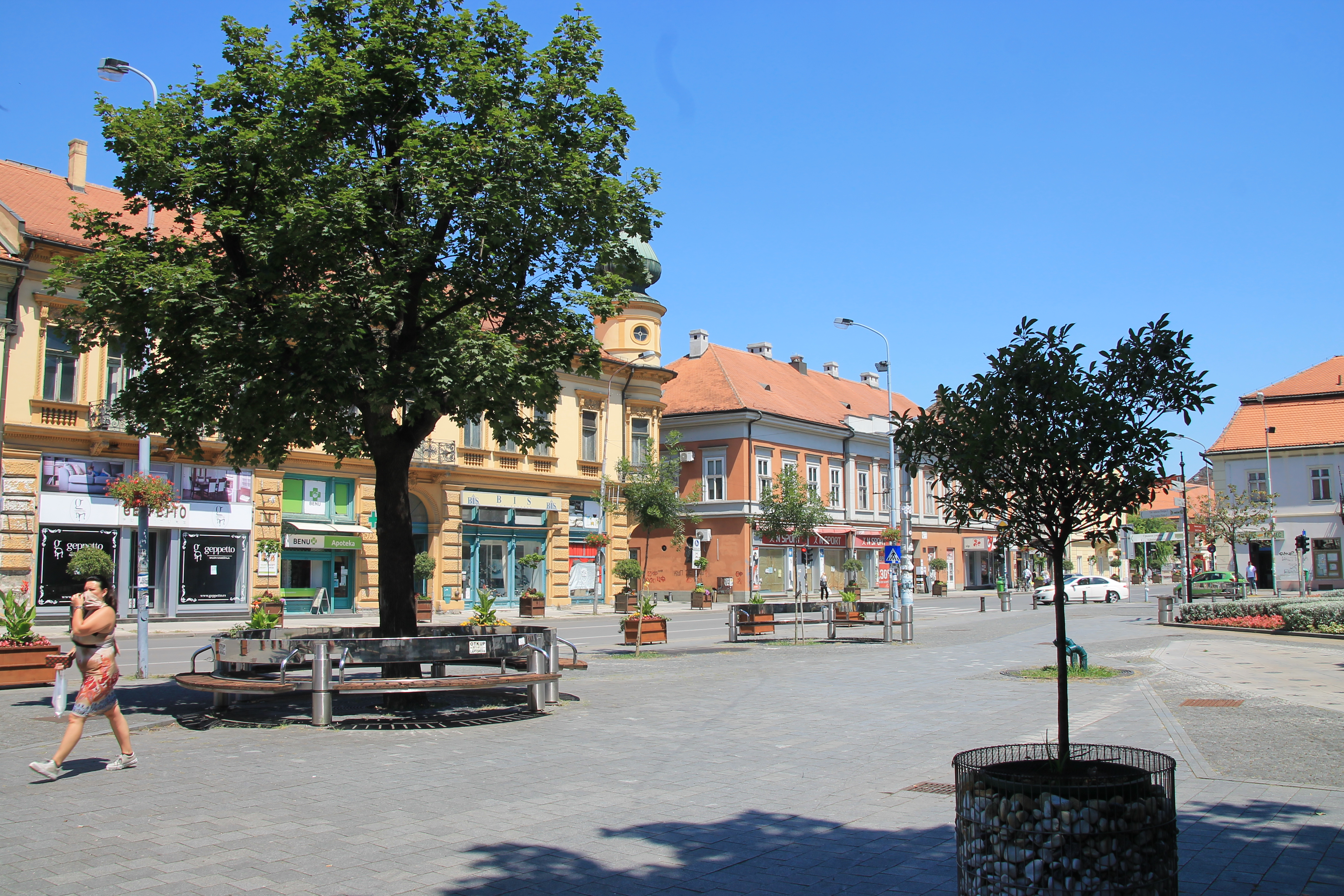
Pančevo
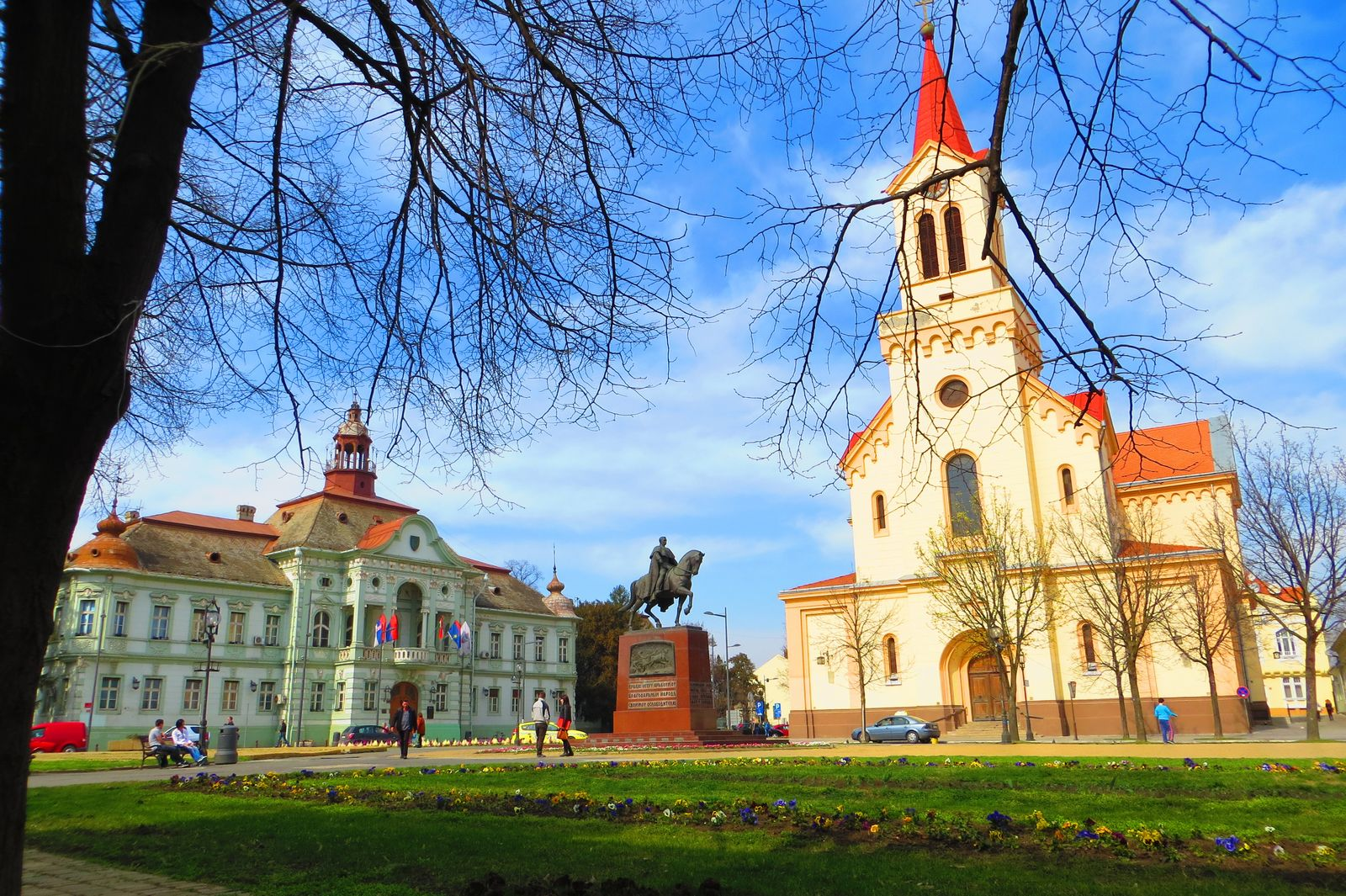
Zrenjanin
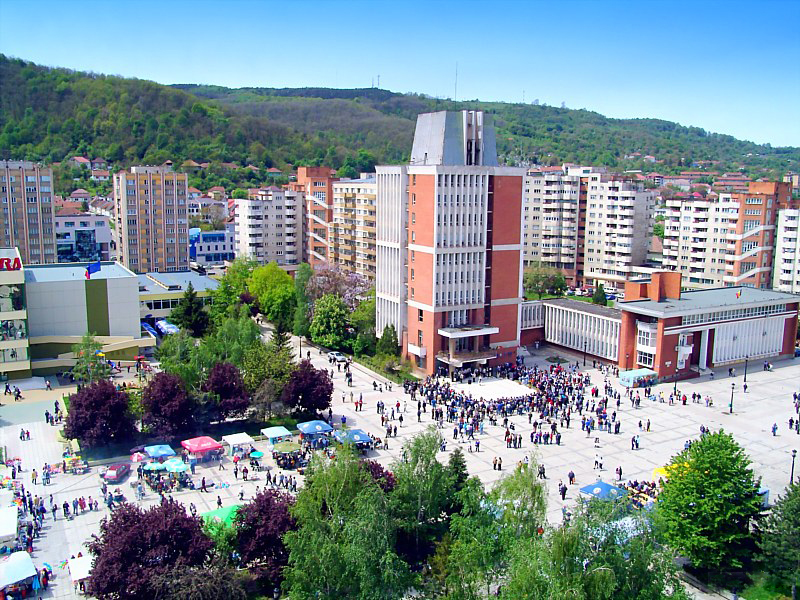
Reșița
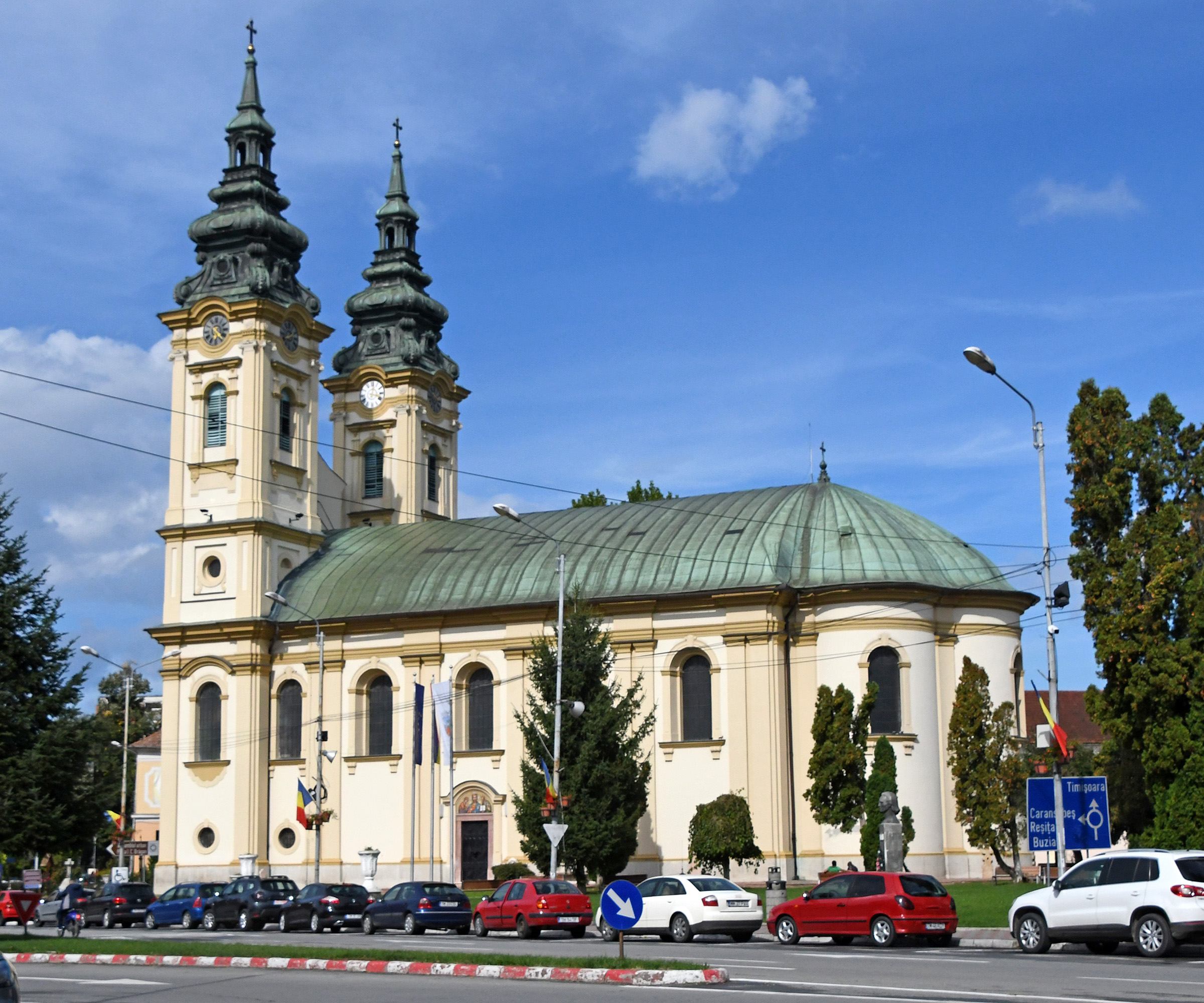
Lugoj
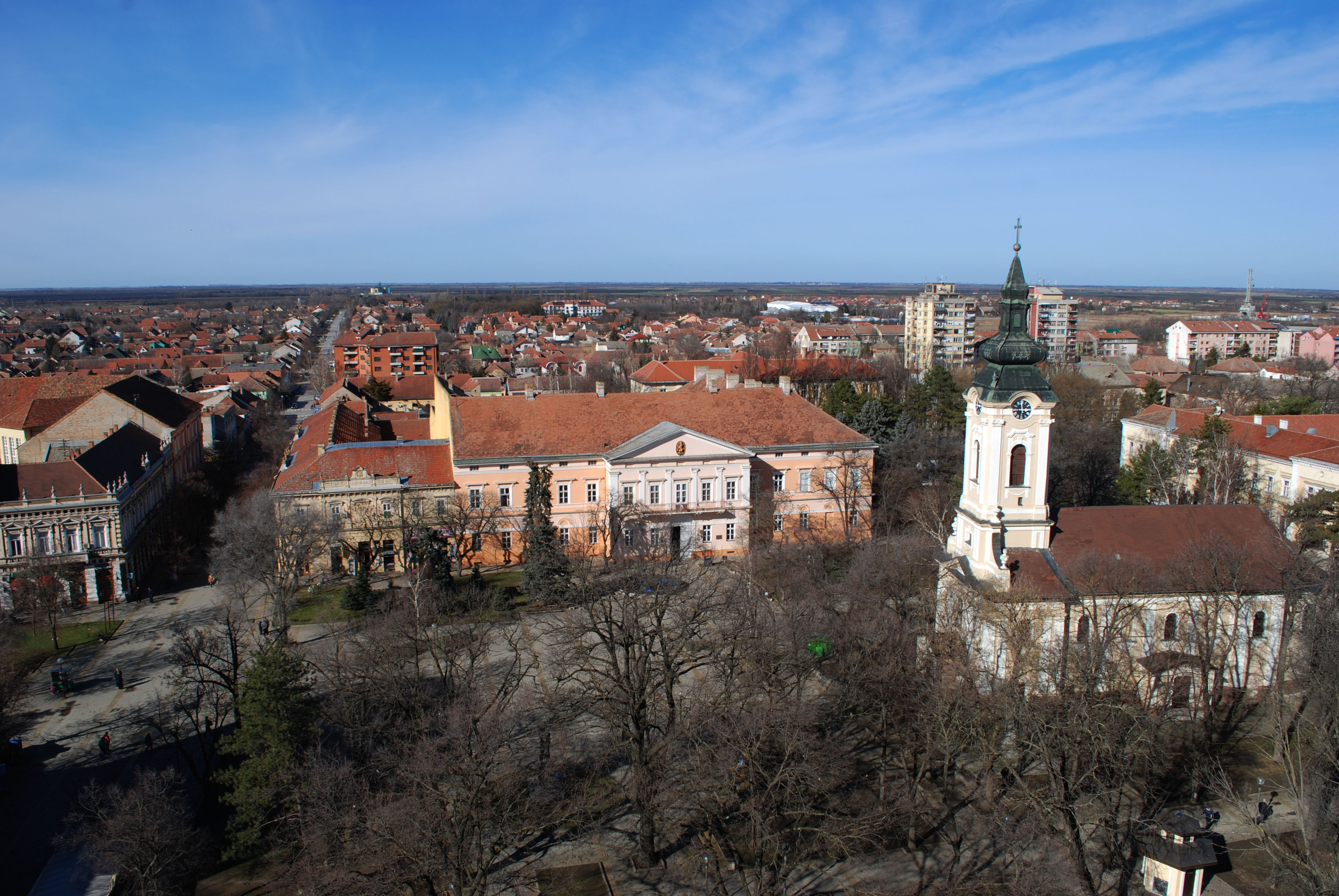
Kikinda

| | City | Population | Country | Administrative | Historic subregion |
|---|---|---|---|---|---|
| 1 | Timișoara | 250,849 | (Romania) | Timiș County | Romanian Banat |
| 2 | Pančevo (Панчево) | 73,401 | (Serbia) | South Banat District | Serbian Banat |
| 3 | Zrenjanin (Зрењанин) | 67,129 | (Serbia) | Central Banat District | Serbian Banat |
| 4 | Reșița | 55,181 | (Romania) | Caraș-Severin County | Romanian Banat |
| 5 | Lugoj | 34,462 | (Romania) | Timiș County | Romanian Banat |
| 6 | Kikinda (Кикинда) | 32,084 | (Serbia) | North Banat District | Serbian Banat |
| 7 | Vršac (Вршац) | 31,946 | (Serbia) | South Banat District | Serbian Banat |
| 8 | Caransebeș | 21,133 | (Romania) | Caraș-Severin County | Romanian Banat |
| 9 | Dumbrăvița | 20,014 | (Romania) | Timiș County | Romanian Banat |
| 10 | Giroc | 17,999 | (Romania) | Timiș County | Romanian Banat |
| 11 | Bocșa | 12,949 | (Romania) | Caraș-Severin County | Romanian Banat |
| 12 | Kovin (Ковин) | 11,623 | (Serbia) | South Banat District | Serbian Banat |
| 13 | Novi Bečej (Нови Бечеј) | 10,967 | (Serbia) | Central Banat District | Serbian Banat |
| 14 | Sânnicolau Mare | 10,627 | (Romania) | Timiș County | Romanian Banat |
| 15 | Jimbolia | 10,179 | (Romania) | Timiș County | Romanian Banat |
| 16 | Lipova | 10,040 | (Romania) | Arad County | Romanian Banat |

== Demographics ==
| Year | Total | Romanians | Serbs | Hungarians | Germans | Others |
Romanian Banat
| 1910 | 984,849 | 515,485 (52.3%) | 48,733 (4.9%) | 120,959 (12.3%) | 252,802 (25.7%) | 46,870 (4.8%) |
| 1931 | 961,808 | 532,589 (55.3%) | 36,491 (3.8%) | 97,854 (10.2%) | 246,354 (25.6%) | 48,520 (5.1%) |
| 1956 | 972,490 | 648,925 (66.7%) | 31,156 (3.2%) | 86,592 (8.9%) | 147,275 (15.1%) | 58,542 (6.1%) |
| 1992 | 1,142,710 | 954,846 (83.5%) | 15,622 (1.4%) | 67,497 (5.9%) | 30,843 (2.7%) | 73,902 (6.5%) |
| 2002 | 1,078,190 | 916,492 (85.1%) | 20,937 (1.9%) | 59,691 (5.5%) | 21,083 (1.9%) | 59,987 (5.6%) |
Serbian Banat
| 1910 | 580,957 | 76,398 (13.1%) | 232,009 (40.0%) | 109,510 (18.8%) | 133,495 (23.0%) | 29,175 (5.1%) |
| 1931 | 586,906 | 61,743 (10.5%) | 271,900 (46.3%) | 90,670 (15.4%) | 116,900 (20.0%) | 45,693 (7.8%) |
| 1953 | 631,485 | 55,439 (8.8%) | 388,268 (61.5%) | 110,030 (17.4%) | 6,277 (1.0%) | 69,911 (11.3%) |
| 1992 | 690,314 | 33,795 (4.9%) | 460,929 (66.7%) | 72,508 (10.5%) | —N/a | 124,072 (17.9%) |
| 2002 | 616,202 | 27,661 (4.1%) | 435,577 (70.7%) | 62,890 (10.2%) | 854 (0.1%) | 74,059 (14.4%) |
Hungarian Banat
| 1910 | 16,758 | 85 (0.5%) | 3,588 (21.4%) | 11,683 (69.7%) | 1,248 (7.5%) | 154 (0.9%) |
| 1930 | 18,483 | —N/a | 471 (2.5%) | 16,967 (91.9%) | 1,045 (5.6%) | —N/a |
| 1949 | 19,334 | —N/a | —N/a | 19,024 (98.4%) | —N/a | 310 (1.6%) |
| 1990 | 18,601 | —N/a | —N/a | 18,601 (100%) | —N/a | —N/a |
| 2001 | 20,139 | —N/a | —N/a | 20,139 (100%) | —N/a | —N/a |

=== Romanian Banat ===
Romanians form a majority in the south, center and east of Banat. Their share increased, after 1930, also in the Timiș Plain (where they were a minority) through immigration from Transylvania, Moldavia and Oltenia. In some settlements the majority is made up of other peoples: Serbs make up the absolute majority in Pojejena (Пожежена) and Svinița (Свињица), and the relative majority in Socol (Соколовац); Croats (Krašovani) make up the majority in Carașova (Karaševo) and Lupac (Lupak); Bulgarians make up the majority in Dudeștii Vechi (Stár Bišnov); while Ukrainians make up the majority in Știuca (Щука) and Copăcele (Копашиль).

=== Serbian Banat ===
In most cities and municipalities of the Serbian Banat, the majority population is Serbian. Hungarians make up the relative majority of the population in the municipality of Čoka (Csóka), while Slovaks make up the relative majority in the municipality of Kovačica. Romanians make up the majority in certain villages of municipalities of Alibunar, Plandište, and Vršac. Czechs are majority in a tiny village of Češko Selo in Bela Crkva municipality.

=== Hungarian Banat ===
In the Hungarian part of Banat, the majority population is Hungarian, but in some villages in the region (Deszk/Деска, Szőreg/Сириг, Újszentiván/Нови Сентиван) there are a small ethnic Serbian communities.

== Symbols ==
The traditional heraldic symbol of Banat is a lion, which is nowadays present in both the coat of arms of Romania and the coat of arms of Vojvodina. It is assumed that the Banat lion has its origin in the Cuman lion.

The current coat of arms of the Romanian Banat was designed in 1921, after the union of the Banat with the Kingdom of Romania, by the heraldist József Sebestyén by combining some elements from the coats of arms of Temes and Krassó counties from 1779 to represent the "Romanian Banat of Severin". It consists of a red shield in which is represented a golden lion rampant emerging from a golden bridge with two arched openings, built of carved stone, over an azure river. According to its author, "the lion is the old (Cuman) element, the bridge is the new element, Trajan's Bridge over the Danube". The coat of arms from 1921 was modified in 1992 by adding a sabre in the right paw, recalling the backsword of Pál Kinizsi, count of Temes.

Coat of arms of the Romanian Banat

Serbs use the seal of the Velika Kikinda District of 1774 to represent Banat. It also features a golden lion rampant with a sabre in the right paw and a severed Turkish head in the left one.

== Notable people ==
- Vladimir Boberić (1873–1918), bishop of the Serbian Orthodox Church
- Constantin Daicoviciu (1898-1972), historian and archaeologist
- Radomir Antić (1948–2020), football player and coach
- Mihajlo Idvorski Pupin (1858–1935), Serbian physicist, physical chemist and philanthropist
- Iolanda Balaș (1936–2016), high jumper
- Béla Bartók (1881–1945), composer, pianist and ethnomusicologist
- Sava Temišvarac, (1570-1612), Serb military commander
- Pera Segedinac, (1655-1736), leader of the Serbian border guard along the Mureș river
- Osman Ağa of Temeşvar (1670-1725), Ottoman military figure
- Emil Petrovici (1899-1968), Romanian linguist and Slavist
- Miodrag Belodedici (b. 1964), football player and coach
- Dejan Bodiroga (b. 1973), basketball player
- Nicu Covaci (b. 1947-2024), singer
- Sava II Branković, Orthodox priest and Saint
- Vuk Drašković (b. 1946), writer and politician
- Nicolae Kovács (b. 1911), footballer
- Nikola Grbić (b. 1973), volleyball player and coach
- Vladimir Grbić (b. 1970), volleyball player
- Arnold Hauser (1892–1978), art historian and sociologist
- Aleksa Janković (1806-1869), Prime Minister of Serbia, born in Timișoara
- Petrică Moise (1947-2021) (ro) folk music performer and composer
- Ion Ivanovici (1845–1902), military band conductor and composer
- Francesco Illy (1892–1956), inventor of coffee machine and businessman
- Đura Jakšić (1832–1878), painter, poet, storyteller and playwright
- Zita Johann (1904-1993) actor
- Károly Kerényi (1897–1973), philologist and father of Greek mythology studies
- Ștefan Kovács (1920–1995), football player and coach
- Nikolaus Lenau (1802–1850), poet
- Bela Lugosi (1882–1956), actor
- Herta Müller (b. 1953), novelist, poet and essayist
- Ion Cizmaș (b. 1959) (ro) politician
- Dorinel Munteanu (b. 1968), football player and coach
- Dositej Obradović (1742-1811), writer
- Ana Pacatiuș (born 1939), folksinger
- Vasko Popa (1922–1991), poet
- Ivana Španović (b. 1990), long jumper
- Julieta Szönyi (1949–2025), actor
- Ștefan Szönyi (1913–1967) (hu; ro) painter
- Döme Sztójay (1883–1946), soldier and diplomat
- Zoran Tošić (b. 1987), football player
- Traian Vuia (1872–1950), inventor and aviation pioneer
- Zvonimir Vukić (b. 1979), football player
- Johnny Weissmuller (1904–1984), swimmer, water polo player and actor
- Recep Agha (1770-1814), Ottoman military figure
