= Alfred Baur =

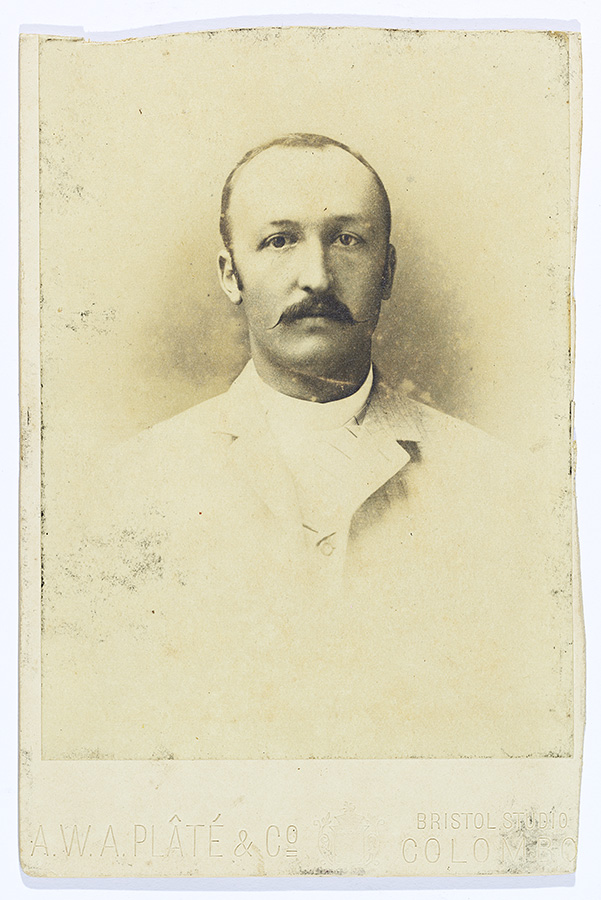
- Baur in 1890
- Born: Alfred Baur; 7 June 1865; Andelfingen, Switzerland
- Died: 9 December 1951 (aged 86); Tournay Castle, Pregny, Switzerland
- Occupations: Businessman, philanthropist, art collector
- Known for: Founding and leading the A. Baur & Co Ltd.; Collection of oriental art
- Spouse: Eugénie Fanny Duret (m. 1894)

Alfred Baur (French pronunciation: [al.fʁɛd boʁ]; 7 June 1865 – 9 December 1951) was a Swiss businessman, philanthropist and art collector who was primarily active in British Ceylon and later settled in Pregny on Lake Geneva.

== Early life and education ==
Baur was born 7 June 1865 in Andelfingen, Switzerland, to Johannes Baur, a blacksmith, and Elisabeth Baur (née Keller), into a Protestant family. He had one younger sister; Anna Ruch (née Baur; 1869–1940).

He completed a commercial apprenticeship at Volkart Brothers in Winterthur, a large international trading firm, that had offices in Colombo, British Ceylon. Ultimately, Baur was posted there as a sales agent.

== Career ==
After his tenure at Volkart, Baur founded his own export trading firm, A. Baur & Co Ltd., in 1897. The company manufactured organic fertilizers which were then used in the agricultural sector. Later, Baur acquired and operated several tea plantations.

Alfred Baur brought together a collection of Chinese porcelain, jade and Japanese art objects which stands out as one of the most beautiful private collections in Europe today. A private collection reflects the preferences of an amateur and, as such, reveals the spirit of his time. Baur chose to buy "small quantities of rare works of art rather than large numbers of articles of inferior quality". Through his collections, he appears as a man of taste. During his lifetime, he donated his collections to a foundation which bears his name and that of his wife, a Genevese by birth: the "Fondation Alfred et Eugénie Baur-Duret".

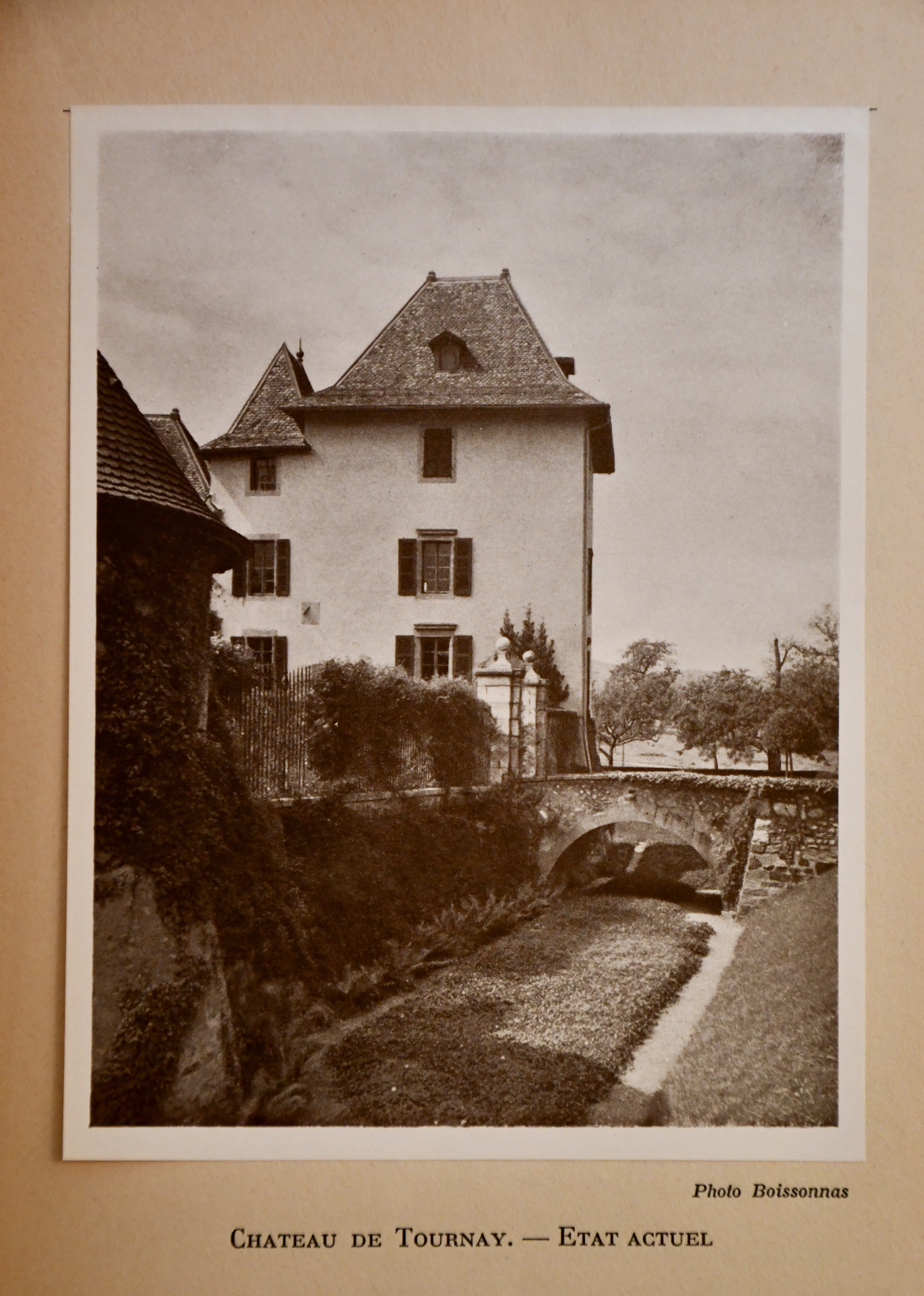
Tournay Castle; Baur's main residence seen in 1947

The director of the museum is Monique Crick. The curator is Helen Loveday.

== Personal life ==
In 1894, Baur married Eugénie Fanny Duret (died 1961), who was widowed of Jules Brunnen, originally from Geneva. They did not have children.

In 1906, after more than twenty years abroad, Baur returned to Switzerland where he acquired the Tournay Castle in Pregny (presently Pregny-Chambésy) near Geneva. He would also acquire Andelfingen Castle in his hometown and establish a retirement home.

Baur had developed a distinct passion for oriental art during his travels. His interest in oriental art had grown increasingly since the end of the previous century, stimulated as it was by scientific research, archeological excavation and the writings of a number of European experts.

== See also ==
- Shoami
- Umetada
- Toreutics
