= Butaul =

Butaul (also spelled Buta-ul, with possible meaning "the son of Buta") is a name mentioned in an inscription contained in a treasure trove of gold artifacts found in 1799 in Sânnicolau Mare, in northern Banat (then under administration of the Habsburg monarchy, today in Timiș County in western Romania). According to various interpretations of the inscription, Butaul was an župan, a sort of local chieftain. It is possible that Butaul is linked to the runiform on the chalice of Kiskőrös-Vágóhíd, which may be transliterated as /put'ə/ (Oghur Turkic for 'louse') or /Buta/ [Oghur Turkic for (camel's) foal].

== The inscription ==
Buta-ul and Buyla are names preserved by an inscription on one of the vessels found in the hoard. The inscription is written in the Greek alphabet and reads:

BOYHΛA.ZOAΠAN.TECH.ΔYΓΕTOIΓH.BOYTAOYΛ.ZΩAΠAN.TAΓPOΓH.HTZIΓH.TAICH

(Transliteration: bouēla zoapan tesē dygetoigé boutaoul zōapan tagrogē ētzigē taisē).

The language of the inscription is unknown. While there is no consensus as to the meaning of the inscription, there is general agreement that Buta-ul and Buyla are personal names from a Turkic language, and that both are identified as holding the title of župan. Other very short inscriptions found on the artifacts there are in a runiform script and also likely to be in a Turkic language, but these are very brief and have not been deciphered.

== Interpretations ==
Various sources provided different interpretations of the inscription. According some opinions, inscription was written by a people whose local leaders had Turkic names and bore Slavic titles. According to other opinions, form ZOAΠAN could be read as "čaban", so BOYTAOYΛ.ZΩAΠAN would mean "son of Buta from the breed of čaban".

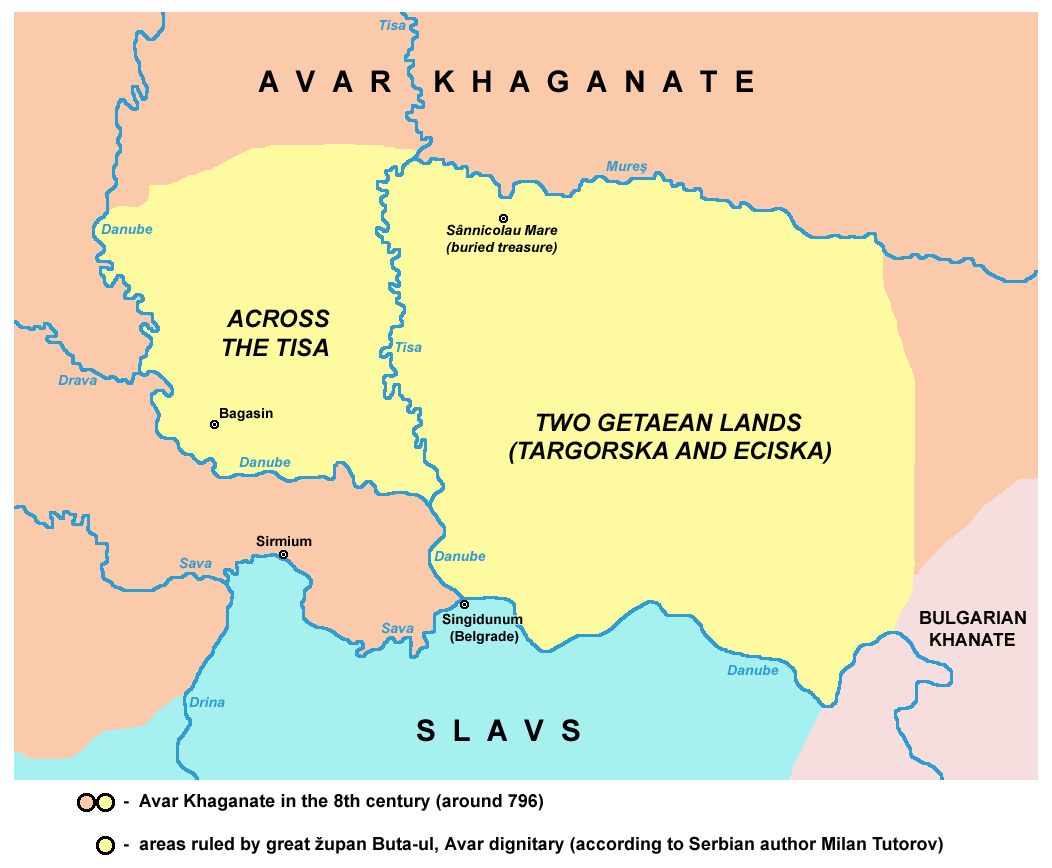
Area ruled by Buta-ul according to Serbian historian Milan Tutorov.

According to one interpretation, Buyla was the grand duke of two Getae lands of the Tisa, while Buta-ul was the duke of the Tagro and Etzi lands of the Tisa. According to other interpretation, Župan Buila (Buyla) was prince of Dügetoigi, while Grand Župan Butaul was prince of Tagrogi and Itschigi (Utschugi). Another interpretation states that Butaul was župan of Tagroges, Iazyges, the peoples of the Tisa. Another translation states that Bela (Buyla) was župan of the Tisa, while Butaul was župan of the Iazyges. According to Serbian historian Milan Tutorov, grand župan Buta-ul was ruler of two Getae lands, Targorska and Eciska and across the Tisa. Tutorov claims that "Getae land" was designation for present-day Banat, while area "across the Tisa" is present-day Bačka.

According to Tutorov, Buta-ul was an Avar noble who had a traditional Slavic ruler's title – the "great župan" (rendering veliki župan). Tutorov also speculates that the Treasure of Groß Sankt Nikolaus was probably buried by Buta-ul in 796, when Pippin, the son of Frankish ruler Charlemagne, penetrated with his army into the centre of Avar caganate near the river Tisa. It is assumed that Buta-ul buried his treasure in great hurry before the Frankish army arrived, since the treasure was buried only half metre deep in the ground.

== See also ==
- Banat
- Buyla
- History of Vojvodina
- Rulers of Vojvodina
- Treasure of Nagyszentmiklós
