= Toreutics =

Type of artistic metalworking

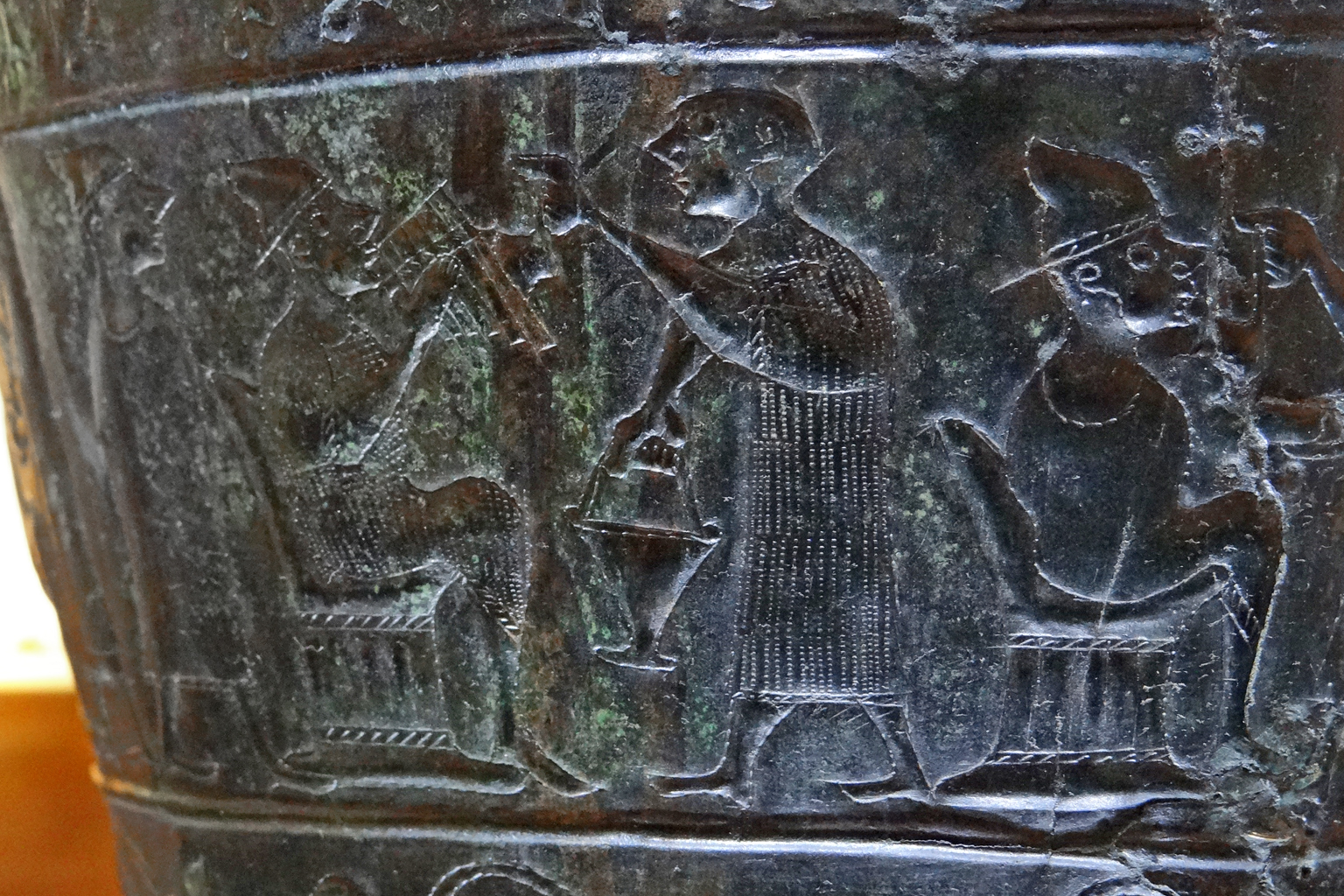
Toreutics on the Vače Situla (Slovenia, 5th century BC)

The term toreutics, relatively rarely used in English, refers to artistic metalworking – hammering gold or silver (or other materials), engraving, or using repoussé and chasing to form minute detailed reliefs or small engraved patterns. Toreutics can include metal-engraving – forward-pressure linear metal removal with a burin.

Toreutics is extremely ancient, and depending on the metal used will survive burial for periods of centuries better than art in many other materials. Conversely if above ground it was likely to be melted down and the metal reused. Until the Middle Ages it was also among the art forms with the highest prestige.

== Archeological background ==
It was practised in the Bronze Age and was well established centuries before the shaft graves. Toureutic items of special quality from the Iron Age are the Certosa situla from Italy and from Slovenia the Vače situla and the Vače belt-plate. Toreutics flourished to an unusual degree among the peoples of Asia Minor, Assyria, Babylon, and passed from thence to ancient Persia. One spectacular example of the direct influence of Persia in toreutics is believed to be the Treasure of Nagyszentmiklós found in Transylvania in 1799, and considered to be work of Old Bulgarian gold smiths. It consists of 23 vessels and has been attributed to Attila's Huns, the Avars and Pechenegs. The majority of scholars however, consider it Bulgarian (Proto-Bulgarians, Bulgars), because of its runic inscriptions.

== Etymology ==
Toreutics comes from Greek "τορεύς" which means "borer, piercerer". As is so commonplace in Greek, there is also an associated adjective, i.e. "τορευτικός" which means "of or for metal work". In both cases the root is the verb "τορεύω" which means "to work in relief"; to work in relief. As Ancient Greek extends back to the Proto-Indo-Germanic language in which the root is*terə- which describes the art of working metal or other materials by the use of embossing and chasing to form minute detailed reliefs. The origin of the use of toreutics in the English language goes back to 1830–40; < Gk toreutikós, equiv. to toreú(ein) 'to bore, chase, emboss' (v. deriv. of toreús graving tool) -tikos.

== Applications ==
- Greek style, Inscriptions on toreutics
- Achaemenid–Persian–Sassanid style, Christian toreutics, Folk craftsmanship, Bulgaria
- Beaten copper (Tibet)
- Tsuba gold toreutics (1860) Mito school.

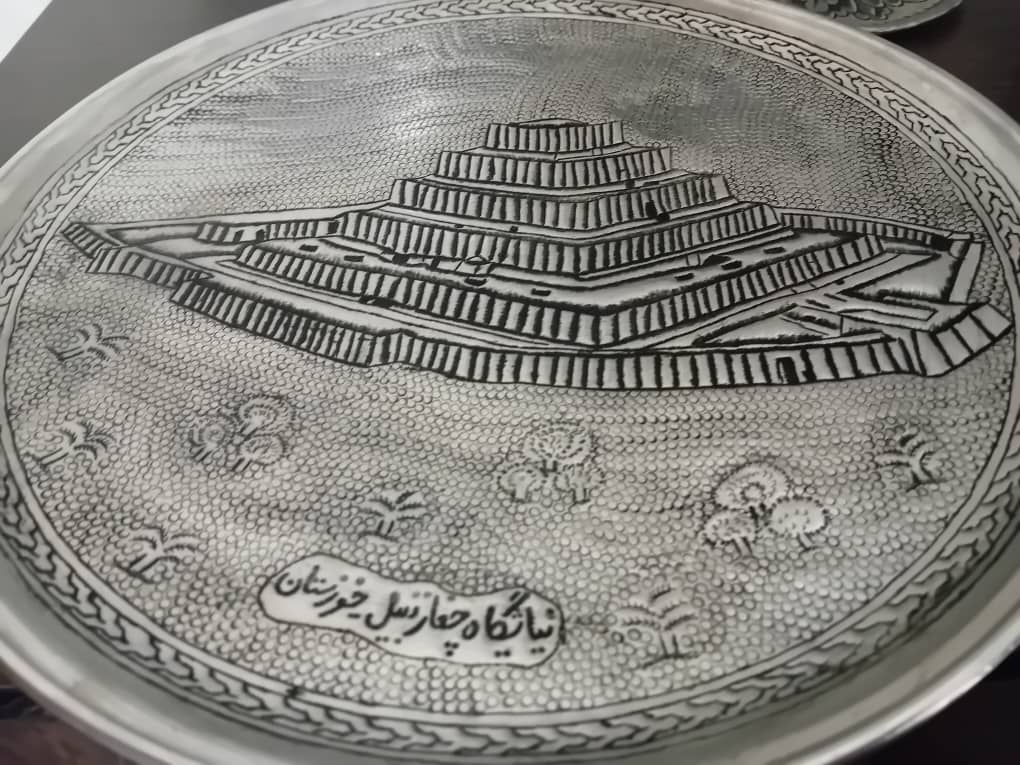

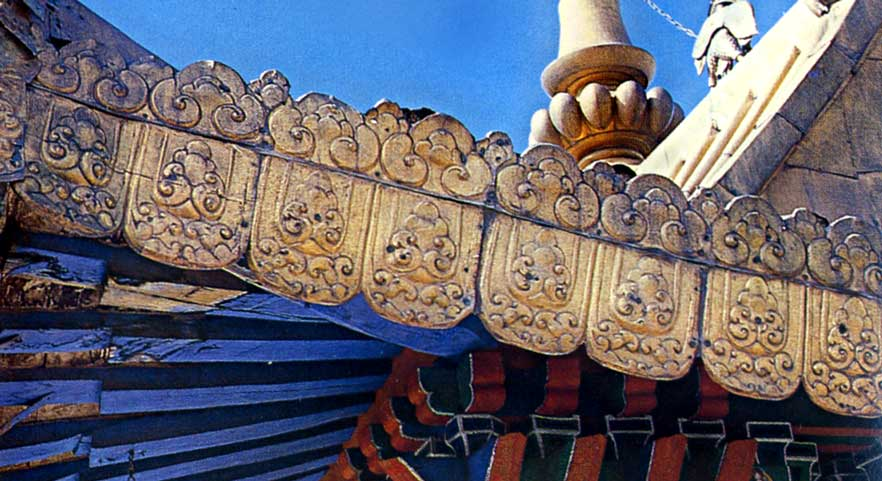
Toreutics on the roof of Potala Palace (dragon head corner).

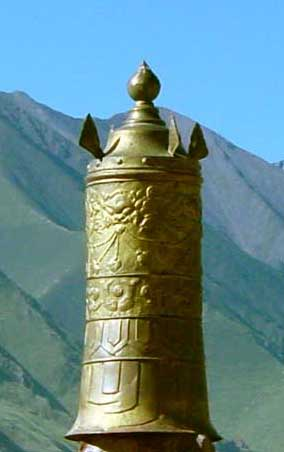
Dhvaja on the roof of Sanga Monastery.

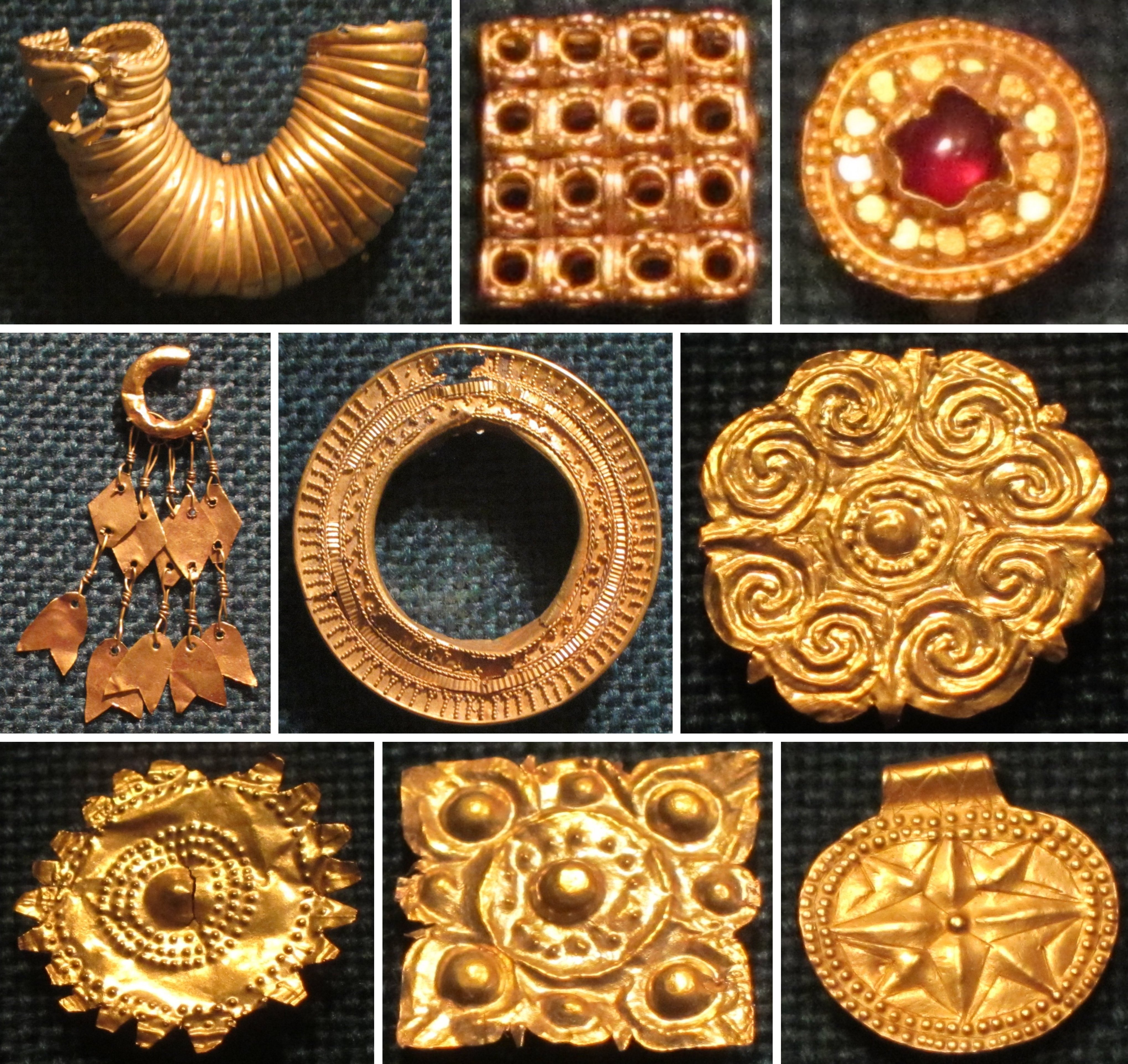
Gold crafts from the Philippines prior to Western contact.

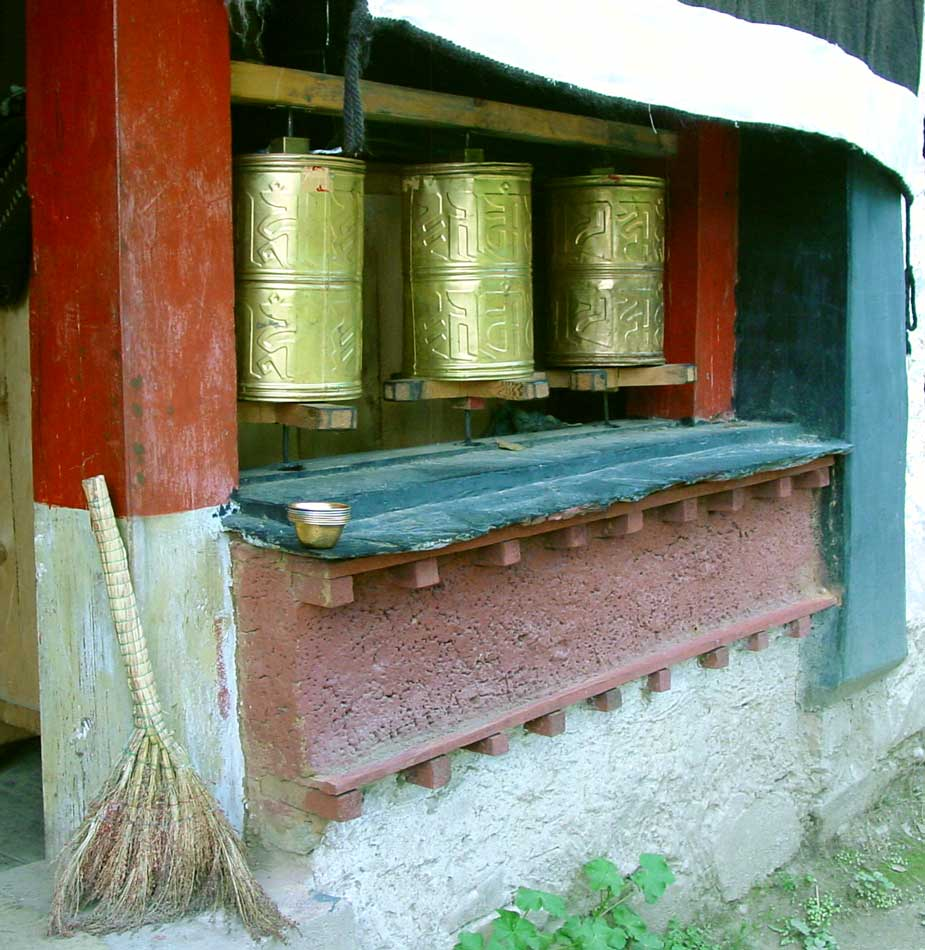
Prayer wheels in Tsozong Gongba Monastery.

== See also ==
- Goldsmith
- Persian-Sassanide art patterns
- Preslav treasure
- Shoami
- Treasure of Nagyszentmiklós
- Umetada
