= Buyla inscription =

West Old Turkic inscription on a bowl

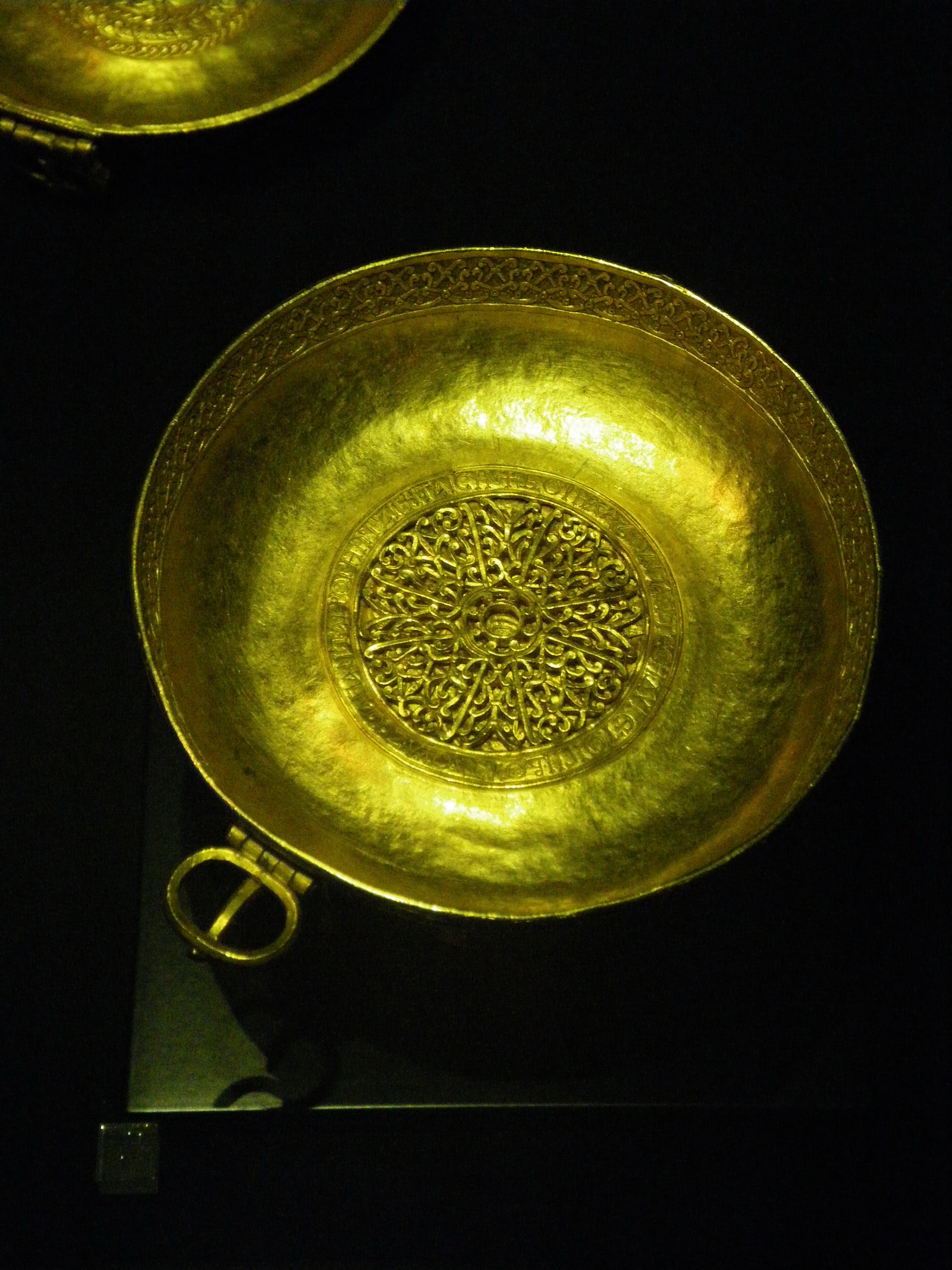
- The buckled bowl bearing the Buyla inscription.
- Material: Gold
- Created: Middle or Late Avar Period (670 AD – 800 AD)
- Discovered: 1799 near Nagyszentmiklós (today Sânnicolau Mare in Timiș County, Romania)
- Present location: Kunsthistorisches Museum, Vienna

The Buyla inscription is a 9-word, 56-character inscription written in the Greek alphabet but in a non-Greek language. It is found on a golden buckled bowl or cup which is among the pieces of the Treasure of Nagyszentmiklós which are now in the Kunsthistorisches Museum in Vienna. The bowl is 12 cm in diameter and weighs 212 g, and has a handle or buckle, perhaps for hanging on a belt. The inscription is found around the outside of a circular design in the middle of the bowl. In the place where the inscription begins and ends, there is a cross. The inscription reads: ΒΟΥΗΛΑ·ΖΟΑΠΑΝ·ΤΕϹΗ·ΔΥΓΕΤΟΙΓΗ·ΒΟΥΤΑΟΥΛ·ΖΩΑΠΑΝ·ΤΑΓΡΟΓΗ·ΗΤΖΙΓΗ·ΤΑΙϹΗ.

The prevailing opinion is that the language of the text is the West Old Turkic (and thus distinct from both Old Turkic and the ancestor of the modern-day Common Turkic languages), and several translations have been proposed, but it has not been deciphered and the exact classification of the language has been a subject of debate. Vilhelm Thomsen translated the inscription: "Boila zoapan finished this bowl [this drinking cup], which Boutaoul zoapan made suitable for hanging up." Nikola Mavrodinov translated it: "Bouila zoapan made this cup; Boutaul Zoapan made this cup suitable for drinking from." Gyula Németh translated it: "Boila chaban's bowl, which was made to his order; Boutaoul had a buckle made for it, and this is his bowl." Paul Lazăr Tonciulescu translated it: "Jupan Buila [has] all rights, jupan Butaul [has the right of] entering [in] all towns.

== Description ==
=== The treasure of Nagyszentmiklós ===
The treasure of Nagyszentmiklós, of which the bowl is a part, consists of 23 decorated gold vessels weighing around 10 kg. It was found in 1799 on the banks of the Aranca river, near Nagyszentmiklós (today Sânnicolau Mare in Timiș County, Romania), in the region of Pannonian Avars settlement in the Carpathian Basin. It was also attributed to the lower Danube Bulgars, and Pechenegs (generally not accepted), but the current view is that the treasure is most probably of Avar origin and closely related to the Avar culture.

The objects were made by specialized craftsmen in the 7th and 8th centuries and were hoarded by local lords. The treasure was last "used" and buried in the second half of the 8th century or perhaps in the early 9th century.

Some of the vessels bear runiform inscriptions. Similar characters can be found on a bone needlecase excavated in the Late Avar cemetery of Szarvas (in Békés County, Hungary) and dated to the second half of the 8th century. Based on this evidence, some scholars proposed a similar date for the Nagyszentmiklós inscriptions.

=== The inscription ===
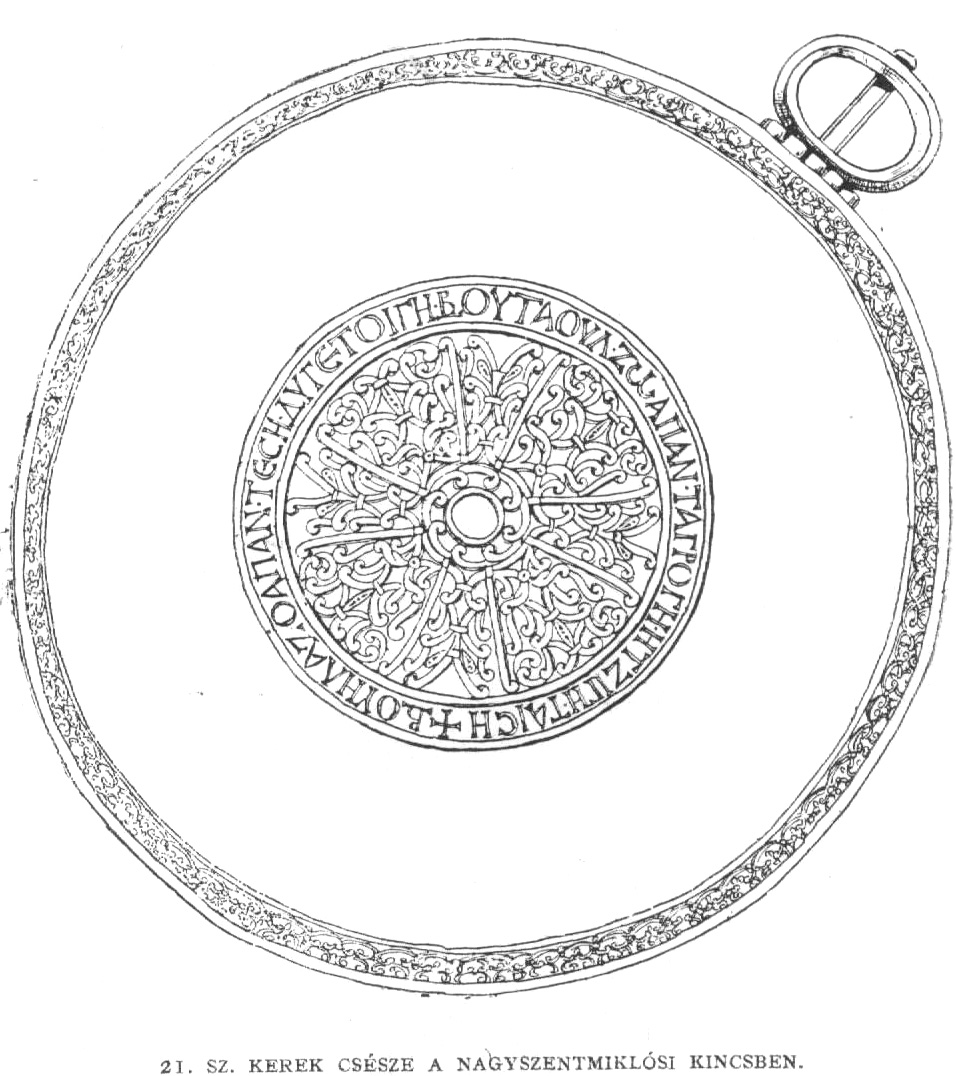
A drawing of the inscription made by József Hampel.

The Buyla inscription is engraved in Greek letters on the inner bottom of a round buckled bowl (no. 21 in József Hampel's list), on a flat ring surrounding a lavishly decorated disk.

The inscription has the following text, easily readable, and uses a C-shaped glyph for sigma:

† ΒΟΥΗΛΑ·ΖΟΑΠΑΝ·ΤΕϹΗ·ΔΥΓΕΤΟΙΓΗ·ΒΟΥΤΑΟΥΛ·ΖΩΑΠΑΝ·ΤΑΓΡΟΓΗ·ΗΤΖΙΓΗ·ΤΑΙϹΗ

The lower case equivalent is:

† βουηλα·ζοαπαν·τεϲη·δυγετοιγη·βουταουλ·ζωαπαν·ταγρογη·ητζιγη·ταιϲη

The transliteration is:

† bouēla·zoapan·tesē·dugetoigē·boutaoul·zōapan·tagrogē·ētzigē·taisē

With vowels changed to Koine equivalents:

† buila·zoapan·tesi·dugetoigi·butaul·zoapan·tagrogi·itzigi·taisi

=== Paleographic and epigraphic considerations ===
Some of the letters of the inscription have distinctive shapes. The letters sigma and epsilon have broad arcs. The base line of delta juts out on both sides. Beta has also a prominent base line, a form found in the Greek inscriptions from Bulgaria dated to the early 9th century, but otherwise it is rarely attested in the Greek-writing world: only on several Cherson coins of the Byzantine emperor Basil I (867-886) and also on one inscription of the same emperor, found in Mesembria (today Nesebar, Bulgaria). The shape of alpha is also attested on the 9th century Greek inscriptions from Bulgaria. On the other hand, omega's unusual shape, with a middle vertical line higher than the rounded sides, is specific for the 6th century Greek inscriptions and the oldest forms of the Greek Uncial script.

==== Vowels ====
In this inscription there is a free alternation between ε and αι, η and ι, and ο and ω. These groups became homophones in Koine Greek, merging to /ɛ/, /i/ and /o/. Also ου was read /u/, υ was read /y/, and οι was read either /y/ or /ø/.

== Interpretations ==
In the late 19th century, József Hampel suggested that the treasure of Nagyszentmiklós was buried by Gepids in the 4th or 5th century AD, and attempted to decipher the text of the inscription using the Greek language. Three words end in -γη, which was read by Hampel as the Greek γῆ = "land, country". He concluded that the inscription records two Gepid princes, Bouila and Boutaoul, and the three lands they ruled: Tagro, Etzi and Dygetoi. The last toponym was connected with the Getae of the Classical Antiquity. This interpretation was sharply criticized by Vilhelm Thomsen and Gyula Németh, who showed that the language of the inscription cannot be Greek, but an old Turkic language.

Today almost all scholars share the view that the text was written in a Turkic language, but it has not been deciphered and the exact classification of the language has been a subject of debate. It has been often compared with the Turkic Bulgar language of the First Bulgarian Empire, attested on several 8th-9th century inscriptions found in north-eastern Bulgaria and written in Greek letters. More recently Eugene Helimski argued the language is close to Proto-Tungusic, but this proposal was rejected by Marcel Erdal as far-fetched.

=== Buyla ===
It is generally agreed that the first word is the Turkic title buyla or boyla (also spelled boila) which is attested on several Old Turkic and Danube Bulgar inscriptions and also mentioned by some 9th and 10th centuries Byzantine authors. Some scholars proposed that Buyla should be read as a personal name in this text, as titles were often taken as personal names. There are more vessels in the treasure of Nagyszentmiklós that mention the name Buyla, such as a goblet.

=== Butaul ===
Butaul is usually read as a personal name. It may be interpreted as "son of Buta" with the final -ul being a development of the Turkic oğul = "son". This etymology was challenged based on the observation that according to the predominant model of construction of Turkic patronymics, the possessive forms oğlu or oğli are expected. Based on the names attested on Old Turkic inscriptions, Erdal posited the reading But Aul.

=== Zoapan ===
In 1900, Karl Brugmann derived the Common Slavic *županъ from župa "district, small administrative region", an etymology that was accepted by many linguists.

== Bibliography ==
- Alemany, Agustí (2009). "From Central Asia to the Balkans: the title *ču(b)-pān". In Allison, Christine; Joisten-Pruschke, Anke; Wendtland, Antje (eds.). Daēnā to Dîn: Religion, Kultur und Sprache in der iranischen Welt. pp. 3–12.
- Bálint, Csanád (2010). "Avar goldsmiths' work from the perspective of cultural history". In Adams, Noel; Entwistle, Chris (eds.). Intelligible Beauty: Recent Research on Byzantine Jewellery. pp. 146–160.
- Бешевлиев, Веселин (1952). Епиграфски приноси (in Bulgarian). София: БАН. p. 96.
- Beševliev, Veselin (1963). Die protobulgarischen Inschriften. Volume 23 in the series Berliner Byzantinistische Arbeiten (in German). Berlin: Akademie-Verlag.
- Brugmann, Karl (1900). "Aksl. župa 'Bezirk'". Indogermanische Forschungen. 11: 111–112. doi:10.1515/9783110242539.111. S2CID 170500221.
- Brückner, Alexander (1908). "Über Etymologische Anarchie". Indogermanische Forschungen. 23: 206–219. doi:10.1515/if-1909-0118. S2CID 202507000.
- Curta, Florin (2006). Southeastern Europe in the Middle Ages, 500-1250.
- Daim, Falko (2003). "Avars and Avar archaeology. An introduction". In Goetz, Hans Werner; Jarnut, Jörg; Pohl, Walter (eds.). Regna and gentes: the relationship between late antique and early medieval peoples and kingdoms in the transformation of the Roman world. pp. 463–570.
- Erdal, Marcel (1988). "The Turkic Nagy-Szent-Miklós inscription in Greek letters". Acta Orientalia Academiae Scientiarum Hungaricae. 42: 221–234.
- Erdal, Marcel (2007). "The Khazar language". In Golden, Peter B.; Ben-Shammai, Haggai; Róna-Tas, András (eds.). The World of the Khazars. pp. 75–108.
- Fiedler, Uwe (2008). "Bulgars in the Lower Danube region. A survey of the archaeological evidence and of the state of current research.". In Curta, Florin; Kovalev, Roman (eds.). The other Europe in the Middle Ages: Avars, Bulgars, Khazars, and Cumans. pp. 151–236.
- Göbl, Robert; Róna-Tas, András (1995). Die Inschriften des Schatzes von Nagy-Szentmiklós: Eine paläographische Dokumentation.
- Helimski, Eugene A. (2000). "On probable Tungus-Manchurian origin of the Buyla inscription from Nagy-Szentmiklós". Компаративистика, уралистика: Лекции и статьи. pp. 268–277.
- Hampel, József (1885). Der Goldfund von Nagy-Szent-Miklós, sogenannter "Schatz des Attila". F. Kilian.
- Paroń, Aleksander (2021). The Pechenegs: Nomads in the Political and Cultural Landscape of Medieval Europe. Brill. ISBN 9789004441095.
- Petrounias, Evangelos V. (2007). "Development in pronunciation during the Hellenistic period". In Christidis, Anastassios Fivos (ed.). A History of Ancient Greek: From the Beginnings to Late Antiquity. pp. 599–609.
- Pohl, Walter (1988). Die Awaren. Ein Steppenvolk in Mitteleuropa, 567-822 n. Chr.
- Róna-Tas, András (1999). Hungarians and Europe in the early Middle Ages.
- Thomsen, Vilhelm (1918). Une inscription de la trouvaille d'or de Nagy-Szent-Miklós (Hongrie).
- Wroth, Warwick (1908). Catalogue of the Imperial Byzantine Coins in the British Museum. Vol. 2.
