= Andelfingen Castle =

- Schloss Andelfingen
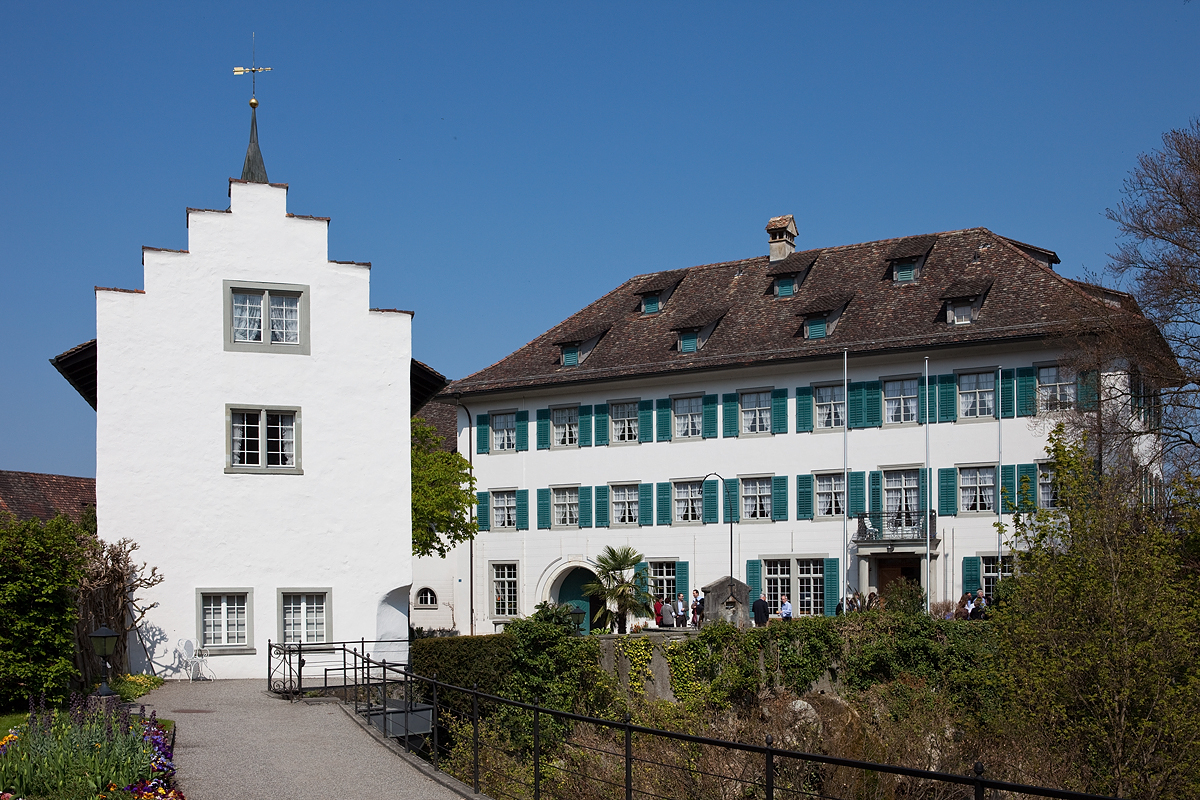
- Interactive map of the Andelfingen Castle area

General information
- Coordinates: 47°35′46″N 8°40′48″E
- Year built: 1613/1782

Andelfingen Castle (German: Schloss Andelfingen or Neues Schloss Andelfingen) is a historic manor house in Andelfingen, Switzerland. It was constructed in the 18th century and replaced a prior 17th century construction that was located about 600-foot (200 meters) west of the original location. It is not to be confused with the Old Andelfingen Castle.

It was built in 1782 and originally used as the official bailiffs office and residence. Later it was acquired by Alfred Baur who operated it as a care home for older gentlemen. Since 2000 the castle is owned by a foundation and houses district offices, an apartment and event locations.
