= Persian-Sassanid art patterns =

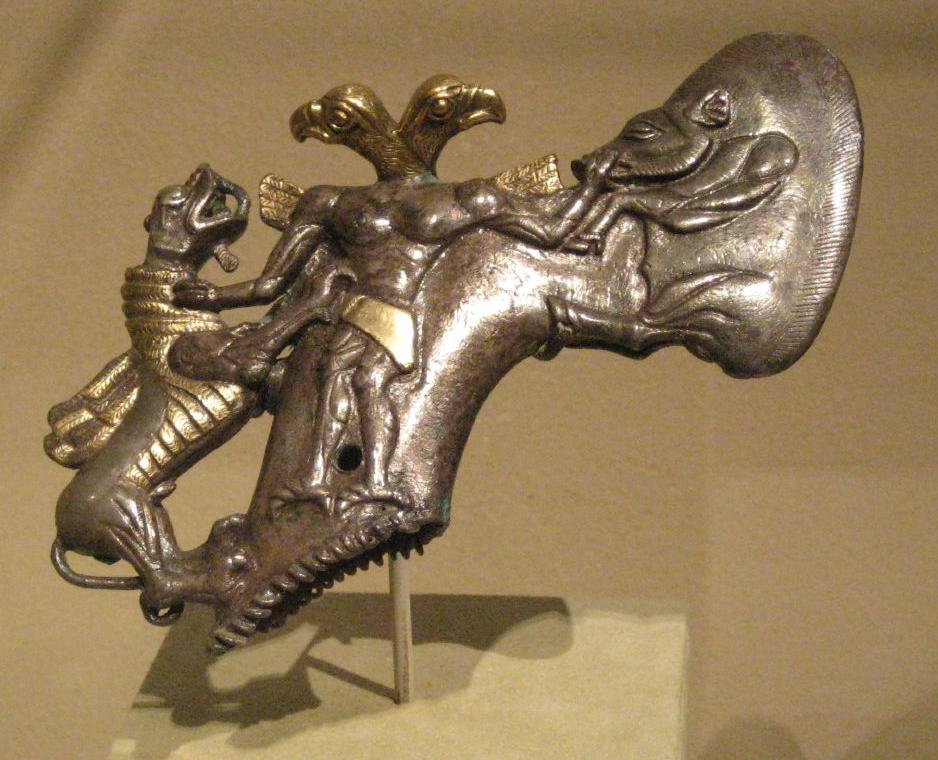
Shaft-hole Axe Head with Bird-Headed Demon, a Boar, and a Dragon figurine. From Central Asia (Bactria-Margiana), late 3rd - early 2nd millennium BC.

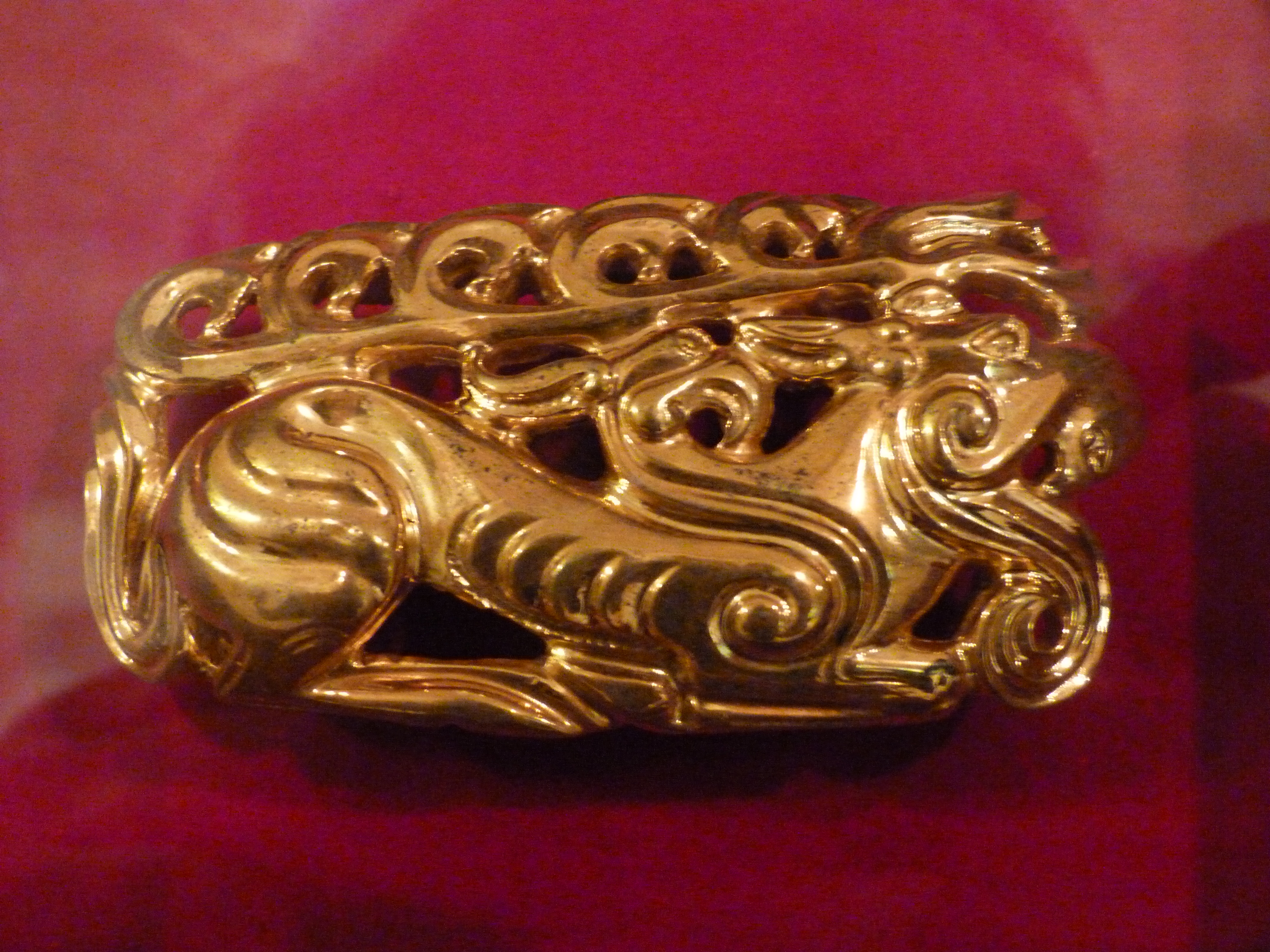
Flying elk with a griffin, from a burial mound at Issyk (5th-4th centuries BC), Kazakhstan

Sassanid art has well known similarities with the art of the Bulgars, Khazars, and Saka-Scythians, that have reocurred in Asia. They predominantly feature motifs of fighting animals typically made of gold.

== Patterns ==
The characteristic patterns of Sassanid art exhibit similarities to the art of the Bulgars, Khazars, and Saka-Scythian, and have recurred at different locations in the Central Asia region. A "griffin fighting an elk" motif from the Treasure of Nagyszentmiklós, found in 1799 in what is today Romania, bears similarities with another griffin & elk motif discovered in the tombs of Hsiung-nu (early Huns, also Xiongnu) during Colonel Pyotr Kuzmich Kozlov expedition (1907–1909) near Urga, Outer Mongolia (now Ulaanbaatar).

A gold symbolization of "animals-in-fight" has been also found in the vicinity of the city of Turpan, the principal crossroad of the northern Silk Road. Golden "animals-in-fight" have also been identified as 3rd–2nd century B.C. Mongolia (or southern Siberia), being characteristic of Hsiung-nu or Xiongnu.

== The art of the nomads ==
The early history of the Nomads is not well recorded, which changed after their contact with cultures possessing written history. Nomadic people of the vast steppes of Asia were a major force in history. Their power was not in the empires they built, but rather the turmoil they created among ancient civilizations such as China or Persia, impacting their historical development substantially. It is believed that the nomads ranged widely, forever moving on for sake of richer grazing for their horses and sheep. Migrations were often seasonal. Their skill at extracting gold was unprecedented. In summer, during the tribe's seasonal migration, a fleece would be weighted on a riverbed to collect particles of alluvial gold. Upon the tribes' return, the fleece would be sheared, burned, and a gold ingot the size of a horse's hoof would result. The tay tayak (the horse's hoof) was a unit of gold for a long period, which was used as a measure of an amount of golden metal rather than money, since gold was not fabricated as currency. Using gold was a spiritual practice, as emblems of priestly office, prizes for physical prowess in ritual sport, or as adornment of the sacral ceremony of marriage.

== See also ==
- Iranian art
- Toreutics
- Asian art
- Treasure of Nagyszentmiklós
- Hunnic Empire
- Xiongnu
- Scythian art
- Thraco-Cimmerian
- Turko-Persian tradition
