= Helen Loveday =

Helen Loveday (born 1962) is a lecturer in Chinese and Japanese art at the University of Geneva and curator of the Baur Foundation, Museum of Far Eastern Art, Geneva. She has written extensively on Asian art and translated a number of books.

== Early life ==
Helen Loveday was born in Geneva in 1962. She earned a BA in Chinese studies (1985) and a PhD in Chinese archaeology (1989) from the University of Oxford.

== Career ==
In 2002, Loveday became a lecturer in Asian art at the University of Geneva where she teaches Chinese and Japanese art. She has been an independent researcher and is also curator of the Baur Foundation, Museum of Far Eastern Art, Geneva.

Loveday has written widely on Asian art. Among the books she has translated into English is Luce Boulnois's La route de la soie-dieux, guerriers et marchands (2001) which was published in English in 2004 as Silk Road: Monks, warriors & merchants on the Silk Road.

== Selected publications ==
=== Articles ===
- "Le lotus dans la céramique Song: adaptabilité et variabilité d’un motif" in Fondation Amaverunt et Musée Ariana, Autour du lotus, Actes de colloque du 30 octobre 1999, Geneva, 2000.
- "La bibliothèque tournante en Chine: quelques remarques sur son rôle et son évolution" in T’oung Pao, Leiden, 2000, Vol. LXXXVI:2.
- "Diversity in eastern Zhou bronze casting: A look at a group of openwork vessels" in Journal of East Asian Archaeology, Vol. 4, 1-4, 2002.
- "Japon héroïque: visions du samouraï à l’époque Edo" in Bulletin des Collections Baur, No. 65, Geneva, 2004.
- "L’âge du Bronze au Vietnam et la culture de Dongson" in Collections vietnamiennes anciennes du Musée Cernuschi, Findakly, Paris, 2005.
- "Tokens of faith: Japanese altar cloths of the Edo period (1615-1868)" in Orientations, May, 2005.
- "Peinture de l'école Kanô, La Rivière Tatsuta, un paravent japonais de Kanô Shôsen'in", in Bulletin des Collections Baur, 71, Baur Foundation, Geneva, 2011.

=== Books ===
- A l’ombre des pins, Chefs-d’œuvre du Musée de Shanghai, catalogue d’exposition, Musées d’art et d’histoire de Geneva, 2004.
- Laques japonais, Baur Collection Guides, Geneva, 2007.
- L’Or des Steppes. Arts somptuaires de la dynastie Liao (907-1125), 5 Continents and Collections Baur, Geneva and Milan, 2007. (with Monique Crick)
- Estampes japonaises, Baur Collection Guides, Geneva, 2008.
- Le Sûtra des Contemplations du Buddha Vie-Infinie, Essai d'interprétation textuelle et iconographique, avec Jérôme Ducor, préface de Jean-Noël Robert (Bibliothèque de l'Ecole des Hautes Etudes, Sciences Religieuses, BEHE 145); Turnhout, Brepols Publishers, 2011. ISBN 978-2-503-54116-7
- Japanese Buddhist Textiles/Textiles Bouddhiques Japonais. 5 Continents, 2015. ISBN 978-8874396450

=== Translations ===
- Sermier, Claire. (2002) Mongolia: Empire of the Steppes - Land of Genghis Khan. Hong Kong: Odyssey Guides. ISBN 9622177166
- Boulnois, Luce, with additional material by Bradley Mayhew & Angela Sheng. (2004) Silk Road: Monks, warriors & merchants on the Silk Road. Hong Kong: Odyssey Books & Guides. ISBN 9622177212
