= Edgar Knobloch =

Czech writer and historian

Edgar Knobloch (11 November 1927 – 3 February 2013) was a Czech writer and historian. He specialised in the history of Central Asia and the Islamic world. He studied Middle Eastern history at the Charles University and the Oriental Institute in Prague. He travelled extensively and first visited Central Asia in 1959. He became a fellow of the Royal Geographical Society in 1999.

== Selected publications ==
=== Czech and Russian language works ===
- Kulja (s Richardem Blahou, Prešov, 1960, rusky)
- V srdci Ázie (1961, slovensky)
- V srdci Asie (první vydání SNDK 1962, česky)
- Kurdská noc (Jean-Richard Bloch; Edgar Knobloch; Vladimír Brett, SNKLU, 1963, česky)
- V zemi pouští a hor: výstava fotografií ze Sovětské Střední Asie (s Miloš Hrbas; Náprstkovo Muzeum Asijských, Afrických a Amerických kultur, 1964, katalog, česky)
- Stesky (Joachim Du Bellay; Edgar Knobloch; Jan Vladislav, SNKLU, 1964, česky)
- Smrt Tamerlánova (první vydání 1965, Triton, 2003, česky)
- Putování k Mongolům (Johannes de Plano Carpini.; Willelmus de Rubruk.; Ruy Gonzales de Clavijo, SNKLU, 1964, česky)
- Umění Střední Asie (s Milošem Hrbasem, SNKLU, 1965, česky)
- Encyklopedie umění středověku (René Huyghe, první vydání Odeon, 1969, česky)
- Turkestan : Taschkent, Buchara, Samarkand : Reisen zu den Kulturatätten Mittelasiens (s Peter de Mendelssohn, Prestel-Verlag, 1973, München; London; New York: Prestel, 1999, německy)
- Strach (s Věrou Martinkovou, Alfa-Omega, 2001, česky)
- Návrat nežádoucí (Alfa Omega, 2002, česky)
- Roztroušená rodinka a jiné rozmarné veršíky (Alfa-Omega, 2003, česky)
- Klec (Triton, 2003, česky)
- Sněhurka a čtrnáct trpaslíků (Alfa Omega 2007, česky)
- Nomádi a Rusové (Triton, 2008, česky)
- Cizinec z povolání (Alfa-Omega, 2009, česky)

=== English language works ===
- The art of Central Asia. Paul Hamlyn, London, 1965.
- Beyond the Oxus: Archaeology, art & architecture of Central Asia. Benn, London, 1972. ISBN 0-510-03351-2
- Baedeker's Netherlands, Belgium & Luxembourg. Prentice Hall, 1984. (co-author)
- Monuments of Central Asia: A guide to the archaeology, art and architecture of Turkestan. I. B. Tauris, London, 2001. ISBN 1-86064-590-9
- The archaeology and architecture of Afghanistan. The History Press, Stroud, 2002. ISBN 0-7524-2519-6
- Russia & Asia: Nomadic & oriental traditions in Russian history. Odyssey Publications, 2007. ISBN 978-9622177857
- Treasures of the great Silk Road. The History Press, Stroud, 2012. ISBN 978-0-7524-7117-4

== See also ==
- Luce Boulnois
