= Editions Olizane =

Editions Olizane logo

Editions Olizane are an independent Swiss publisher of travel books based in Geneva. The firm was established in 1981. It specialises in books about Asia, historic travelogues, photographic books and sports books.

Among other notable books the firm has published, is Luce Boulnois' La route de la soie-dieux, guerriers et marchands (2001), the updating and summation of her thirty years research into the Silk Road.
