= Avar Treasure =

Gold and silver vessels found in Vrap, Albania

The Avar Treasure
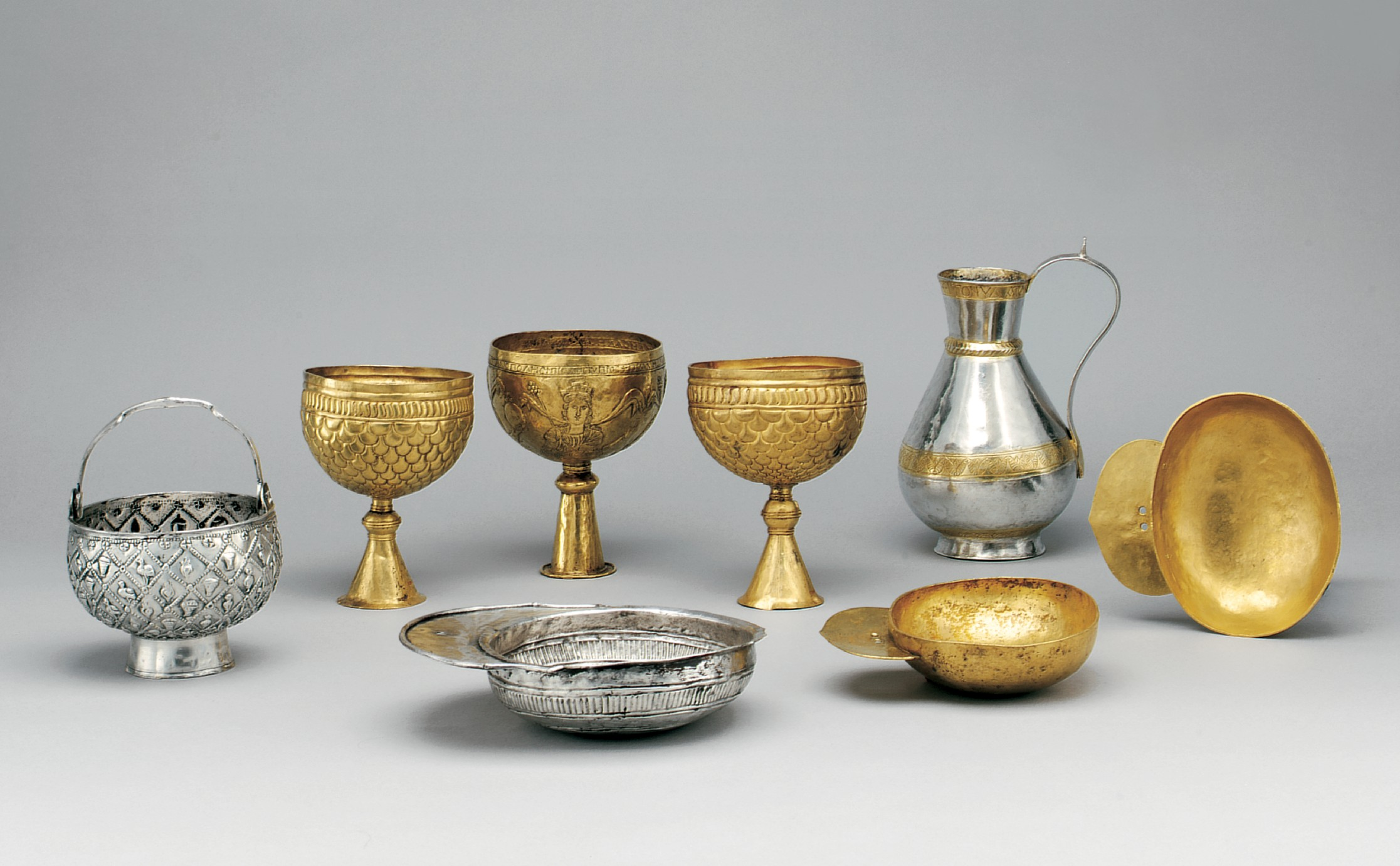
- Year: c. 600–700 A.D.
- Medium: Gold, silver
- Location: Metropolitan Museum of Art; New York

The Avar Treasure, also called Vrap Treasure, is an ensemble currently in the collection of the Metropolitan Museum of Art. The various vessels making up the ensemble were found in Vrap, Albania, and have been attributed to the Avars. On the other hand, the treasure is attributed also to the closely related Bulgars.

The Avars were a nomadic people from the steppes of Eurasia who arrived in the Balkans in the 6th century AD. Being a warlike people, the Avars warred with and subjugated much of the local population, and occasionally clashed with the Byzantine Empire. Through these conquests, the Avars were able to amass considerable amounts of treasure, some of which was buried en masse near Avar settlements. The origin of the treasures found is disputed; some posit that the Avars were themselves skilled metalworkers, while others believe that the valuable objects (including gold jars, cups, and dishes) found in Avar hoards were made in Byzantium and then either looted or given as tribute to the Avars.

German archeologist Joachim Werner has linked the Vrap Treasure to Bulgar Khan Kuber, who led a successful revolt against the Avar Khaganate in Pannonia in the 670s and led a mixed population of some 70,000 Bulgars, Pannonian Slavs and Byzantine Christians to the Eastern Roman Empire, ultimately settling in the Pelagonia plain in present-day Republic of North Macedonia (cf. Sermesianoi). According to Werner, the treasure may have been part of the Khagan's treasury, which was robbed by Kuber and then carried south of the Danube.

The ensemble housed at the Metropolitan Museum of Art was recovered from the Albanian village of Vrap (which rose to international prominence in 1902 when a cache of Avar gold and silver was found in the village) in the early 20th century and given to the museum by J. P. Morgan Jr. in 1917. The ensemble consists of several gold cups, a silver bucket, several drinking dishes and a jug.

== See also ==
- Pereshchepina Treasure
- Treasure of Nagyszentmiklós
- Preslav Treasure
