= Pereshchepina Treasure =

Migration Period hoard

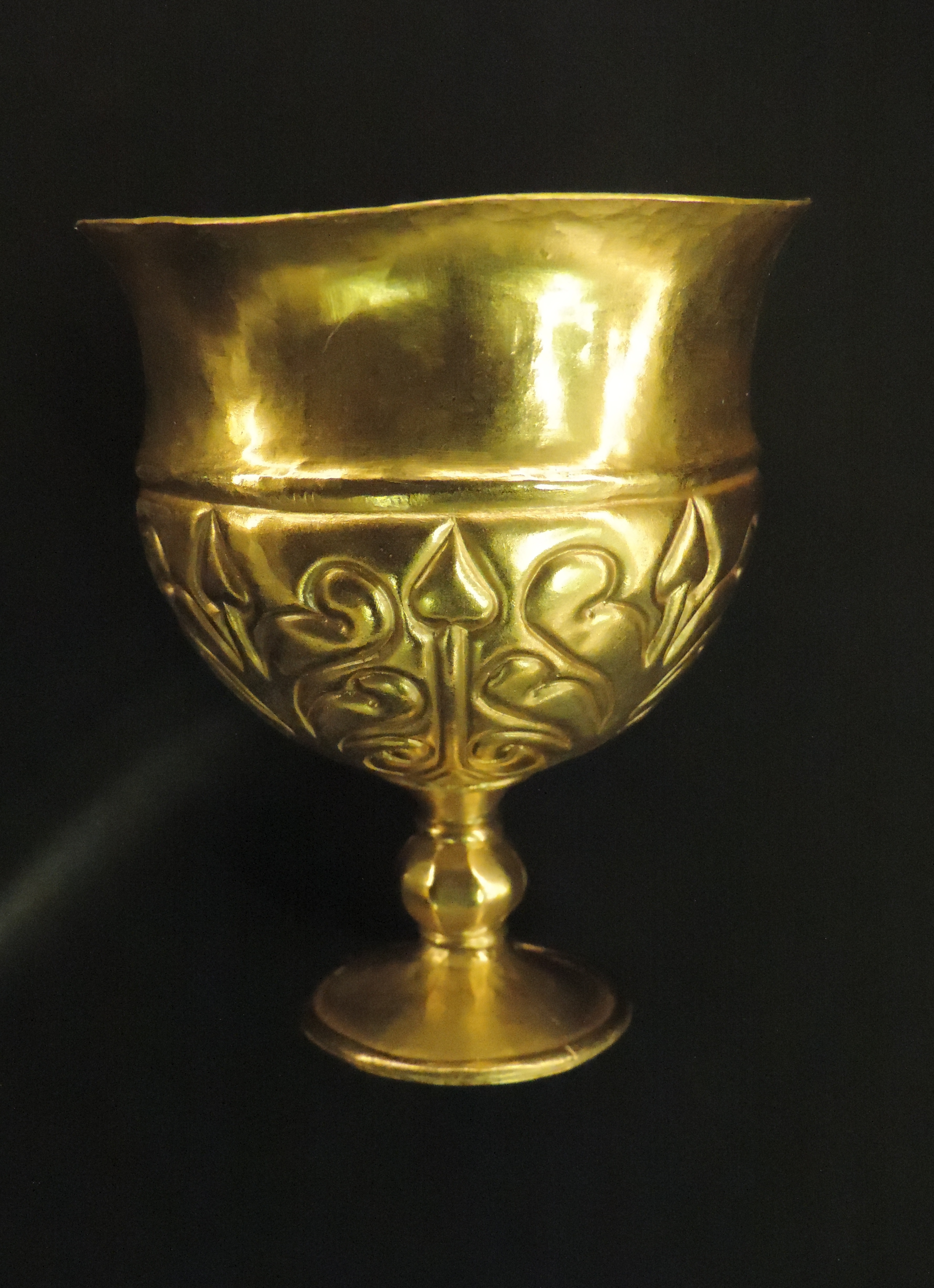
Pereshchepina treasure golden cup

The Pereshchepina Treasure (Russian: Перещепинский клад; Ukrainian: Перещепинський скарб) is a major deposit of Bulgar and Khazar objects from the Migration Period.

The most valuable items are the sword of Kubrat, a gift from Emperor Heraclius and the ring with the monogram of the ruler, as a "patrician", that is, as the savior of the New (Christian) Rome. The sword is valuable as an artifact № 1 of the Hermitage and for the first time left the borders of Russia on May 24, 2019. It is presented in Sofia by Boyko Borisov to Audrey Azoulay.

The deposit was discovered in 1912 in the village of Mala Pereshchepyna (20 km from Poltava, Ukraine) by a shepherd boy who stumbled over a golden vessel and fell into what is sometimes believed to be the grave of Kubrat, the founder of Great Bulgaria and father of Asparuh, the founder of the First Bulgarian Empire. The hoard, first described by Makarenko, was extracted under the supervision of Count Aleksey Bobrinsky, a renowned archaeologist, who published its description in 1914.

The hoard contains more than 800 pieces, now preserved in the Hermitage Museum, Saint Petersburg. There are 19 silver vessels and 16 gold vessels, including a striking rhyton and remains of another. The official website of the museum speaks about

a staff with gold facing, a well-preserved iron sword with an end in the form of a ring and gold facing on the hilt and scabbard... gold jewellery — a torque, an earring, seven bracelets and seven rings with inlays of precious stones (amethysts, sapphires, tiger-eyes, garnets, rock crystal, and emeralds)... and square gold plaques for the facing of a wooden funeral construction".

The total weight of gold from the deposit exceeds 21 kilograms, that of silver objects 50 kilograms.

Among the most interesting finds is a necklace of gold Byzantine gold coins, dating from the reign of Emperor Maurice (582–602 AD) to that of Constans II (641–668 AD), precisely down to 646 AD, which have often been taken to set the terminus post quem for the site. There is also a Sassanian dish bearing an image of Shapur the Great (309–379 AD), and a Byzantine dish with an inscription of the early 6th-century bishop of Tomis. Other finds must probably be dated to as late as the 670s.

Findings from the Pereshchepina Treasure (copies)

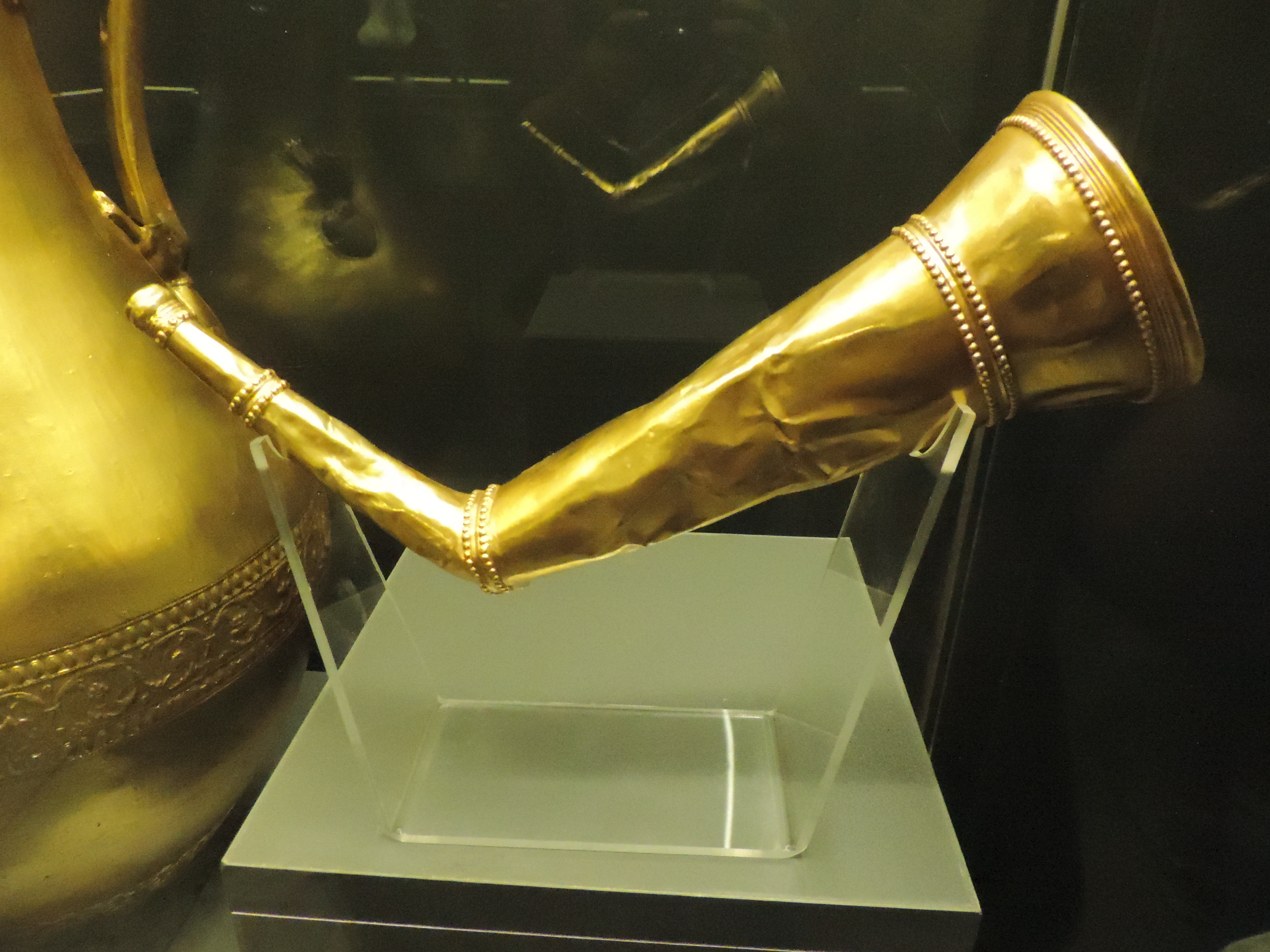

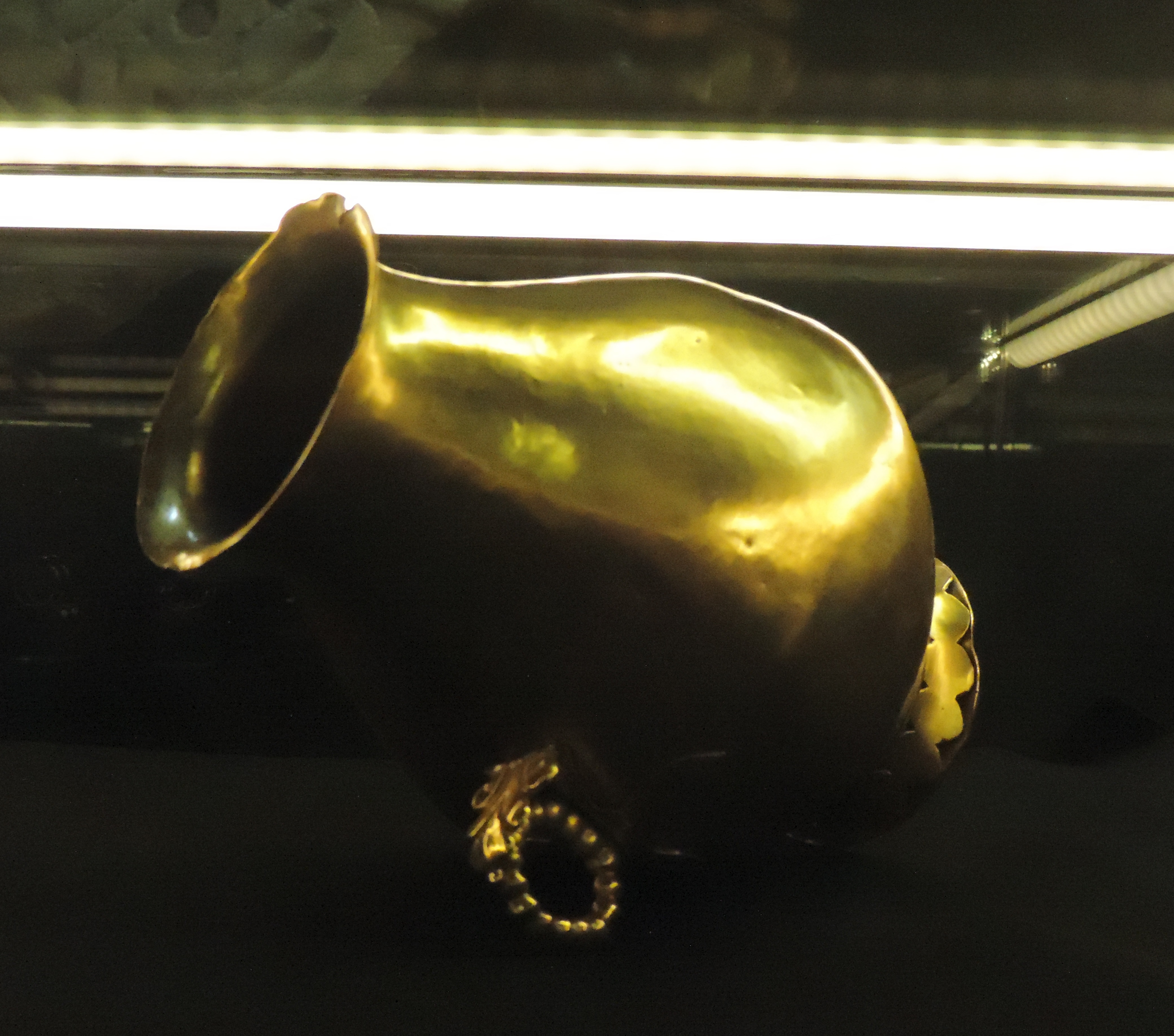
Golden jug

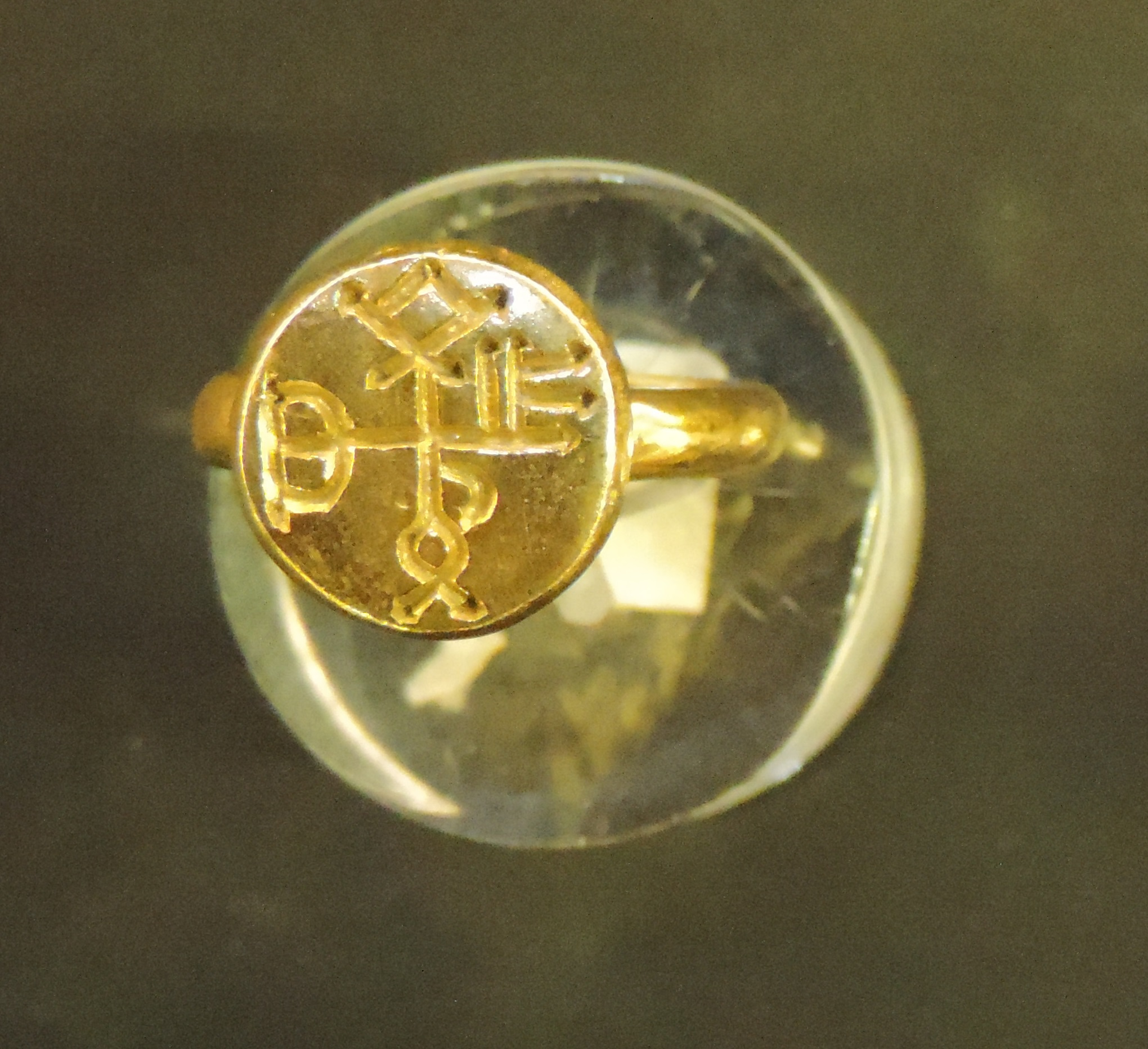
One of the rings with monogram

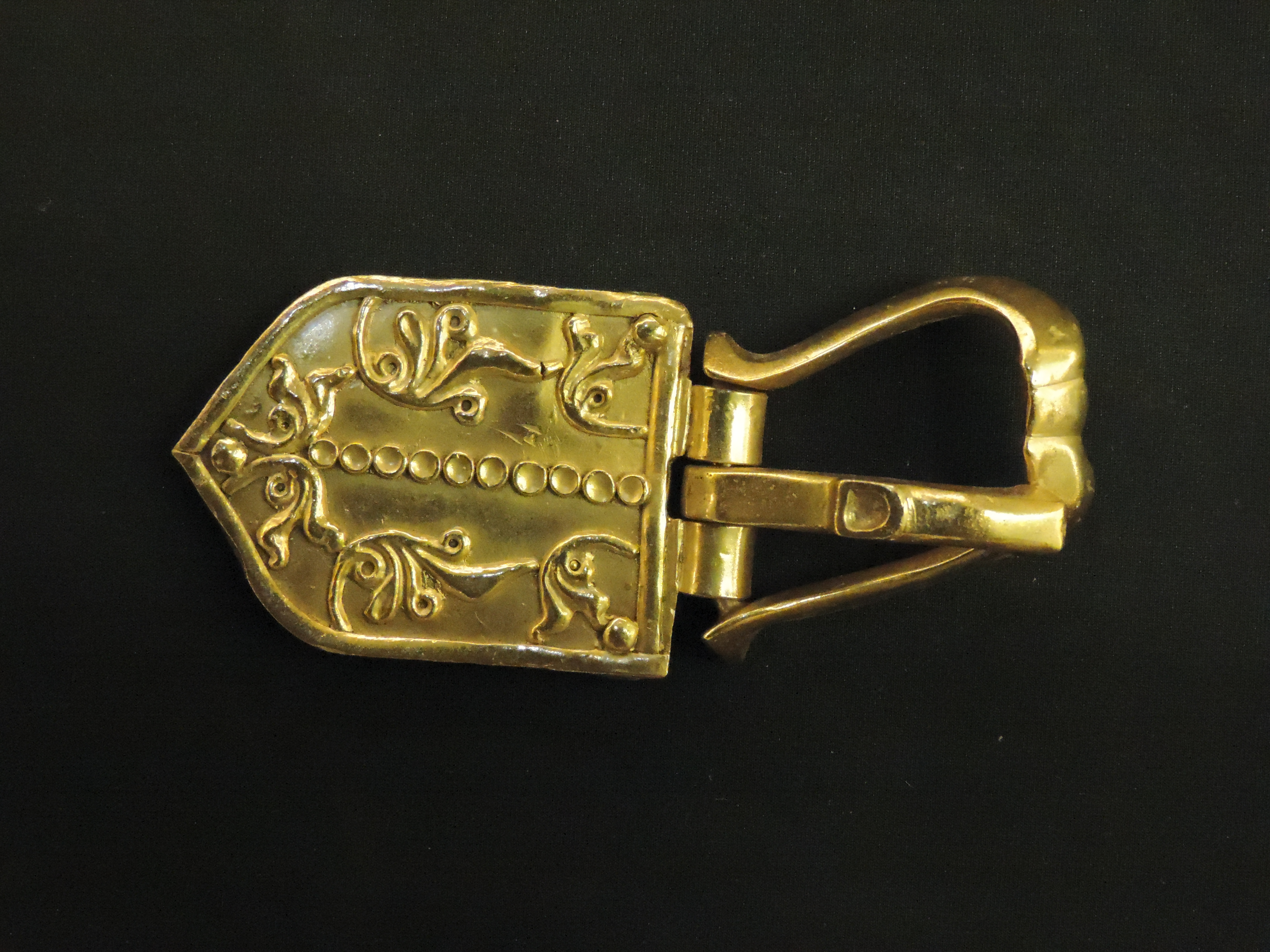
One of the small belt buckles

Although the Great Soviet Encyclopaedia was keen to ascribe the hoard to a "Slavic chieftain" who supposedly pillaged the objects during "a raid against Byzantium," and while, more recently, some scholars attempt to attribute it to the Khazars, many agree that the hoard represents, at least in its earlier phase, the treasure of Kubrat, the first attested khan of the Bulgars. The treasure would have fallen to the hands of later, Khazar Turks as Bulgars left the region. The Pereshchepina hoard ranks among the most vivid manifestations of the typical ancient material culture of Old Great Bulgaria.

== See also ==
- Martynivka Treasure
- Kul-Oba
- Treasure of Nagyszentmiklós
- Preslav Treasure
- Avar Treasure
