= Luce Boulnois =

French historian

Lucette Boulnois (1931–2009) was a French historian of the Silk Road and trans-Himalayan trade. Her career was book-ended by her seminal 1963 book La route de la soie, which was translated into nine languages, and her 2001 elaboration on that work titled La route de la soie-dieux, guerriers et marchands. UNESCO described her as "a world-renowned authority on the history of the fabled trade route".

== Early life ==
Lucette Boulnois was born in France in 1931. She studied Russian and Chinese at the National Institute of Oriental Languages and Civilisations (INALCO) in Paris.

== Career ==
After graduation, Boulnois spent seven years as a translator and it was through the professional contacts and travel that this afforded that she became interested in the Silk Road and trade along it. She was able to visit communist countries when few Western visitors were admitted, and used her language skills to access sources overlooked or inaccessible to most Western scholars. She became an authority on the history of central Asia and particularly of Nepal and Tibet and Sino-Nepalese relations. "Lucette Boulnois was one of the most important scholars of Tibetan economic history. Her 1983 'Poudre d'or et moneys d'argent au Tibet (principalement au 18eme siecle) [Gold Dust and Silver Coins of Tibet (Mainly in the 18th Century)]' is one of the earliest, still among the most important, and unfortunately one of the least cited monographs on the subject." She worked at the National Centre for Scientific Research (CNRS) for nearly 30 years in Nepalese and Himalayan studies before retiring in 1992.

Boulnois's first book was the seminal La route de la soie, published with a preface by renowned sinologist Paul Demiéville in Paris in 1963. It was published in English in London and New York in 1966. The book has since been translated into nine languages in all, including Chinese and Japanese. The first edition received only a qualified welcome, being praised for its scope and enthusiasm but also criticised for not being up to date with the latest scholarship, poor referencing, the lack of an index and the omission of references to some authorities in the field.

In 2001, Boulnois published her summation of her researches as La route de la soie-dieux, guerriers et marchands, which was translated into English by Helen Loveday and published in 2004 as Silk Road: Monks, warriors & merchants on the Silk Road.

== Death ==
Boulnois died in 2009. UNESCO described her as "a world-renowned authority on the history of the fabled trade route".

== Selected publications ==
- La route de la soie. Preface by Paul Demiéville. Arthaud, Paris, 1963. (Signes des temps. No. 16.)
- The Silk Road. Translated by Dennis Chamberlin. Allen & Unwin, London; Dutton, New York; 1966.
- Cartes du Népal dans les bibliothèques de Paris et de Londres. Éditions du centre national de la recherche scientifique, Paris, 1973.
- "Démons et tambours au désert de Lop. Variations Orient-Occident" in Médiévales, No. 22-23, pp. 91–115, 1992.
- La route de la soie-dieux, guerriers et marchands. Editions Olizane, Geneva, Switzerland, 2001. ISBN 2880862493
- Silk Road: Monks, warriors & merchants on the Silk Road. Translated by Helen Loveday with additional material by Bradley Mayhew & Angela Sheng. Odyssey Books & Guides, Hong Kong, 2004. ISBN 9622177212
- "Gold, wool, and musk: Trade in Lhasa in the Seventeenth Century" in Gray Tuttle & Kurtis R. Schaeffer (Eds.) (2013) The Tibetan History Reader. New York: Columbia University Press. pp. 457–476. ISBN 9780231144681

== See also ==
- Edgar Knobloch
