= Tournay Castle =

Castle in Geneva, Switzerland

- Château de Tournay
- Pregny-Chambésy
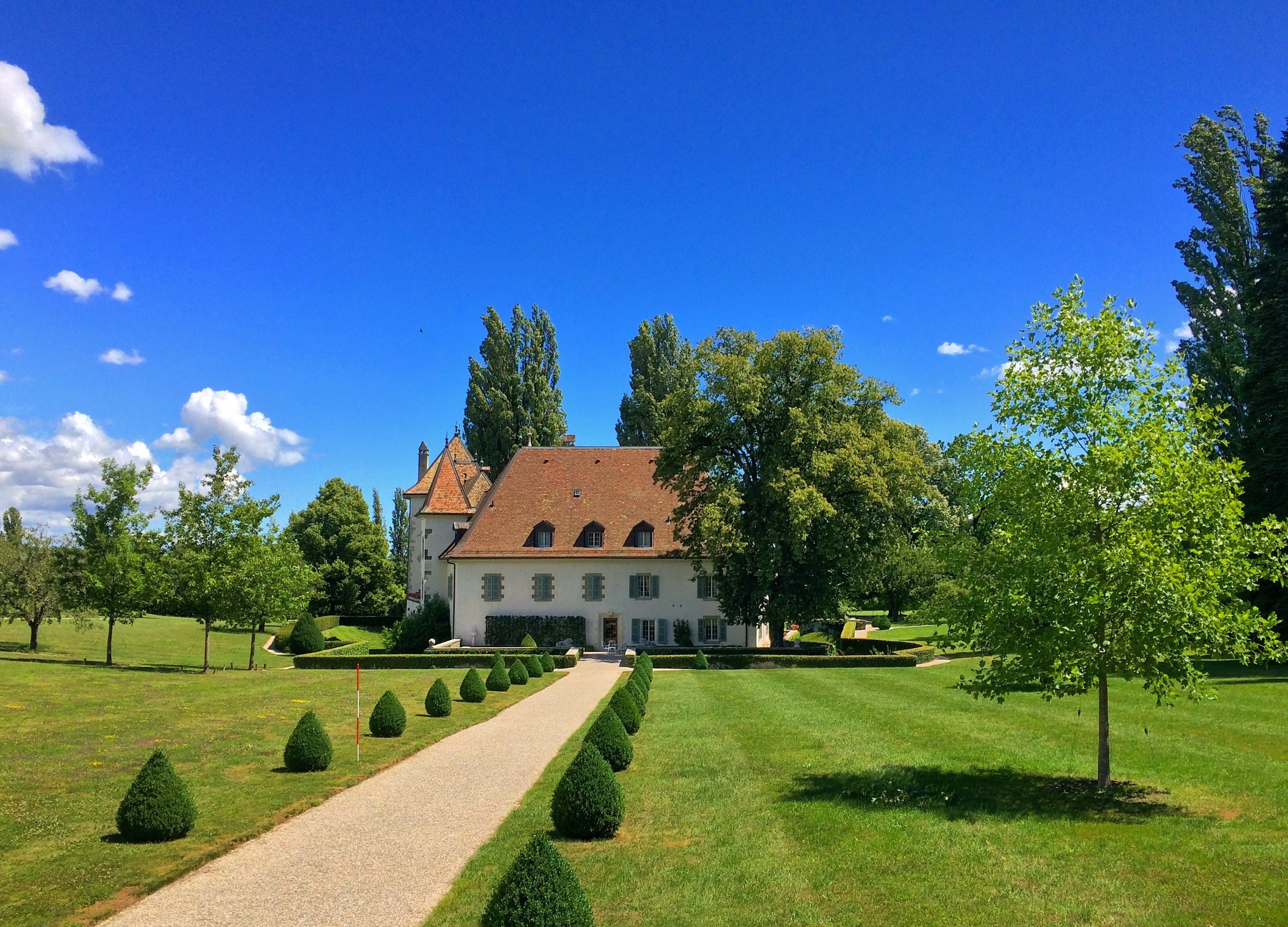

Site information
- Type: Manor house

Location
- Coordinates: 46°14′13″N 6°8′17″E

Site history
- Built: 1601

Garrison information
- Occupants: Privately owned

The Tournay Castle (French: Château de Tournay) is a castle in the municipality of Pregny-Chambésy, in the Canton of Geneva, Switzerland. It is classified as Cultural Property of National and Regional Significance.

While it was likely built in the 15th century, no written source provides any details regarding its origins. In 1583, it became the property of the Brosses family. It was burned and pillaged in 1590 by Genevan soldiers. In 1758, the Castle and its countal title were acquired by Voltaire under a lifetime lease. However, the theatrical performances he organised in the Castle attracted the ire of the locals. The Castle was seized during the French Revolution, and then sold in 1794. It was purchased by merchant and collector Alfred Baur in 1915, and was owned after his death by the Baur Foundation until 2009, when it was acquired by a private individual.

== See also ==
- List of castles and fortresses in Switzerland
