= Shoami =

Artistic style of Japanese sword-guard

Shoami (and Ko-Shoami) is a name of an artistic school (style) for making sword-guards (tsuba), mounted on a Japanese sword (uchi-gatana or just katana). The sword-guard is one of the most important symbols of the samurai.

== Etymology ==
The "ami" part of this name, which derives from the name of the Amida Buddha, was once used to indicate a rank among priests of a branch of Buddhism called Jishu. Later, after the founding of the Ashikaga shogunate, a number of men engaged in serving the shogunal house in artistic or technical capacities included this word in their names.

== History ==
In the Muromachi period, samurai of high standing began to use the uchi-gatana; and as a result, outstanding guards for these weapons came into demand. Possibly the elevation of the status of the silver-smith to a position where he was entitled to use a name like Shoami dates from the time when craftsmen began producing fine sword guards of this kind. Naturally, as the popularity of the uchi-gatana increased, so did orders for them and for their guards. This in turn increased the number of people desiring to master the technique of guard design and production, since this field of endeavor promised prestige and reward. Apprentices to sword-guard makers must have grown in numbers, and probably feudal lords outside the capital invited these men to work for them.

From the Muromachi period until the nineteenth-century edict prohibiting the carrying of swords, Shoami guards in a wide range of styles were being produced all over Japan. In fact, so numerous are the types of Shoami guards that it is even considered safe by some people to call anything unassignable to another group Shoami. Furthermore, although some Shoami guards produced for specific clients are of high quality, they were made in quantity to be treated as merchandise and sold as souvenirs of the capital city; and there is a tendency to regard Shoami guards generally as inferior.

== Influence ==
Shoami guards had great influence on other schools of design and production. For example, Higo guards (produced in Higo Province), often called "the flower of sword guards," are closely connected with Shoami works. Such famous guard makers as Hirata Hikozo, Nishigaki Kanshiro, and Shimizu Jingo were trained in the Shoami style, and the Shoami influence is great in the works of Hayashi Matashichi and Miyamoto Musashi. Moreover, a large number of Shoami sword guards easily pass as products of the more highly regarded Higo, Kanayama, and Owari groups. For these reasons, Shoami guards deserve proper evaluation for their powerful influence and for their intrinsic merit as objects worthy of appreciation.

== Aesthetics ==
The characteristic of the Shoami design is abundant movement with symmetry. The seppa-dai and the hitsu-ana for the kozuka and kogai are wide, giving the guards a slightly heavy appearance. Truly outstanding Shoami open-work guards are limited to Kyoto Shoami, and even among these the most valued are the Ko-Shoami, or old Shoami, from the Muromachi and Azuchi-Momoyama periods. Muro-machi-period Ko-Shoami guards have a style that falls between those of Kyo-sukashi and Owari. Those of the Momoyama period have elements in common with the style of Nishigaki of the Higo group.

== See also ==
- katana
- Umetada
- saya
- Aesthetics
- Toreutics
