= Preslav Treasure =

Artifacts found in Castana, Bulgaria

Coordinates: 43°10′N 26°49′E

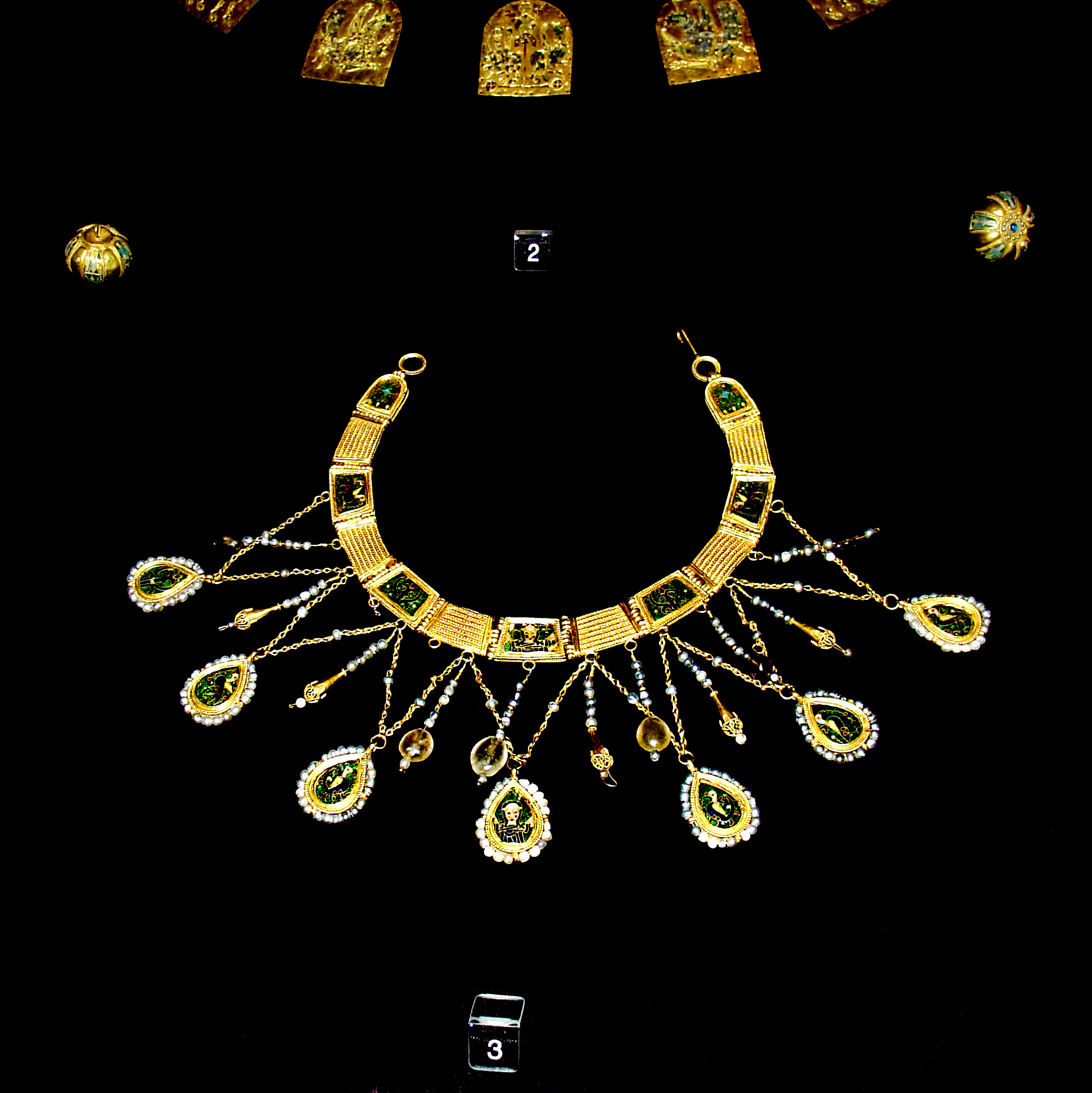

The Preslav Treasure was found in autumn of 1978 at the vineyard in Castana, 3 kilometres (1.9 mi) to the north - west of the second Bulgarian capital – Veliki Preslav. The excavations that followed revealed more than 170 golden, silver and bronze objects including 15 silver Byzantine coins belonging to Constantine VII, Romanos II (945 and 959) and other artifacts dating far back to the period between 3rd and 7th centuries.

The Preslav Treasure was concealed during the turbulent events between 969 and 972 - when Preslav was conquered first by Kiev royal prince, Sviatoslav I of Kiev and two years later by the Byzantine Emperor, John Tzimisces.

Several techniques of jewelry making were used in producing adornments, buttons, appliques etc.: not limited to casting in moulds, welding of small gold balls (granules) or fine gold wire filigree, inlays of pearls and multi-colored enamel.

The owner of the necklace (see on the left) was probably under the protection of Virgin Mary, who is portrayed on both central medallions. It is possible that Peter I of Bulgaria gave this beautiful jewelry as a wedding gift to his bride, Irene Lekapene, the Byzantine princess, in 927 in Constantinople. It is assumed that the necklace was a wedding present because the images of water-birds symbolize family happiness and fidelity.

== See also ==
- Treasure of Nagyszentmiklós
- Pereshchepina Treasure
- Avar Treasure
