= Vocational Training (Switzerland) =

Vocational Training (colloquially referred to as Apprenticeships) is a part of Switzerland's dual education system which combines general and professional school education. Vocational education is part of the secondary education sector. There are a variety of programs offered and covered by most industries (from administration to trade professions).

Basic education includes a two-year training for a vocational certificate, along with vocational apprenticeships designed as three- or four-year programs. The legal basis for this is the Vocational Education and Training Act, enacted in 2004. The act defines vocational education as a shared responsibility between the federal government and states. The State Secretariat for Education, Research, and Innovation issues education regulations that outline the goals, requirements, and duration of vocational education programs.

About two-thirds of young people in Switzerland undergo vocational education and training, with the percentage varying by region. In 2019, nearly 70,000 young individuals earned a vocational education certificate.
