= József Hampel =

Hungarian archaeologist (1849–1913)

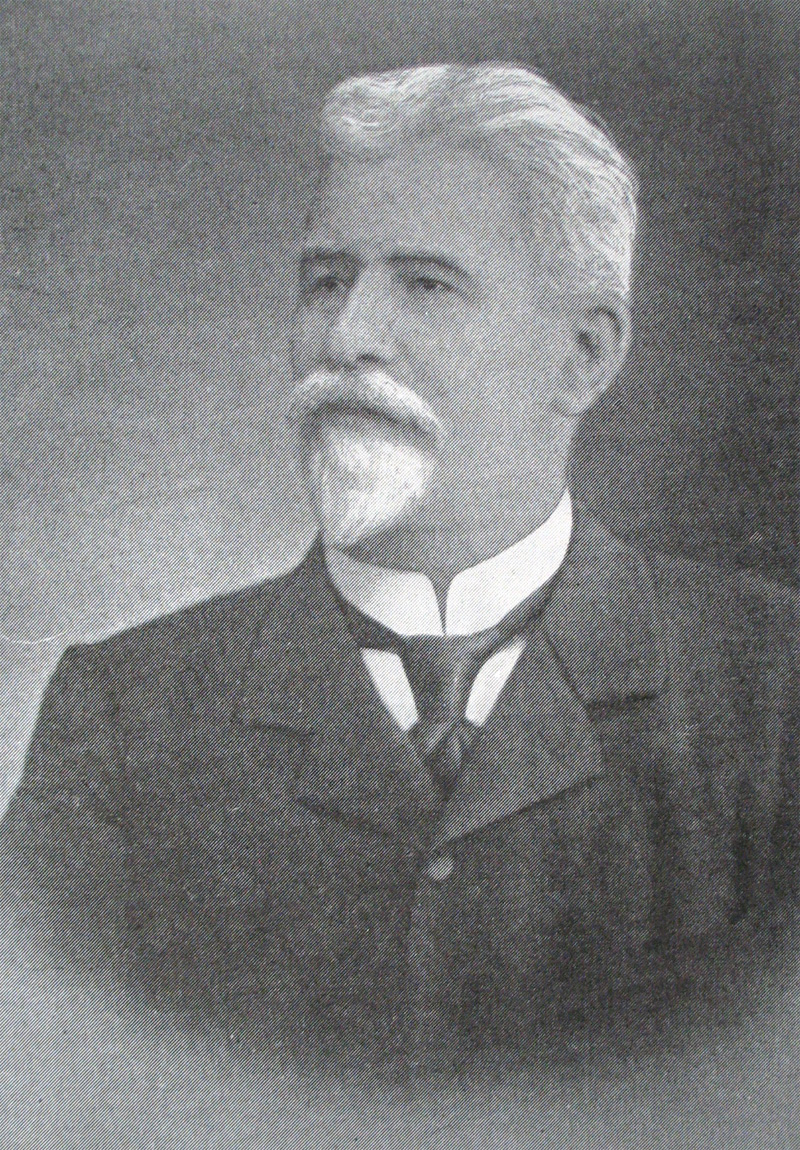
- Born: 10 November 1849; Pest, Kingdom of Hungary
- Died: 25 March 1913 (aged 63); Budapest, Kingdom of Hungary
- Scientific career
- Fields: Archaeology
- Workplaces: Hungarian Academy of Sciences

József Hampel (10 November 1849 – 25 March 1913) was a Hungarian archaeologist and member of the Hungarian Academy of Sciences. He also worked as an editor-publisher of the professional journal Archaeologiai Értesítő.
