= Umetada =

Japanese style of metalwork decoration

Umetada is a Japanese style of decoration for metal work. It may have been used by silversmiths since the Muromachi period. But in the Momoyama period, a certain Umetada Myoju (1558–1631) emerged to become the founder of the manufacture of so-called "new swords," or shinto, and to rank with Kaneie and Nobuie as a great designer and maker of sword guards. Although he is said to have done metal carving for sword mounts, not a single sword guard that can safely be said to have been carved by him remains. Most of the things that do remain are works in inlay, (zogan) in copper, brass, and shakudo using designs that recall the colorful pictures of the Ogata Kōrin school. Umetada Myoju established the style and the fame of the Umetada name, which flourished greatly after his time. But he was not the first to make sword guards in the Umetada style. Both nameless craftsmen and a certain Mitsutada are known to have done this kind of work before Myoju. It seems likely that was the case with Shoami guards - Umetada guards were first produced in the Muromachi period. Those before Myoju are based on Shoami ideas and are called Ko-Umetada, or old Umetada.

== See also ==
- katana
- saya
- Shoami
- Aesthetics
- Toreutics
- Cloisonné
