= Treasure of Nagyszentmiklós =

Twenty-three early medieval gold vessels found in what is now Romania

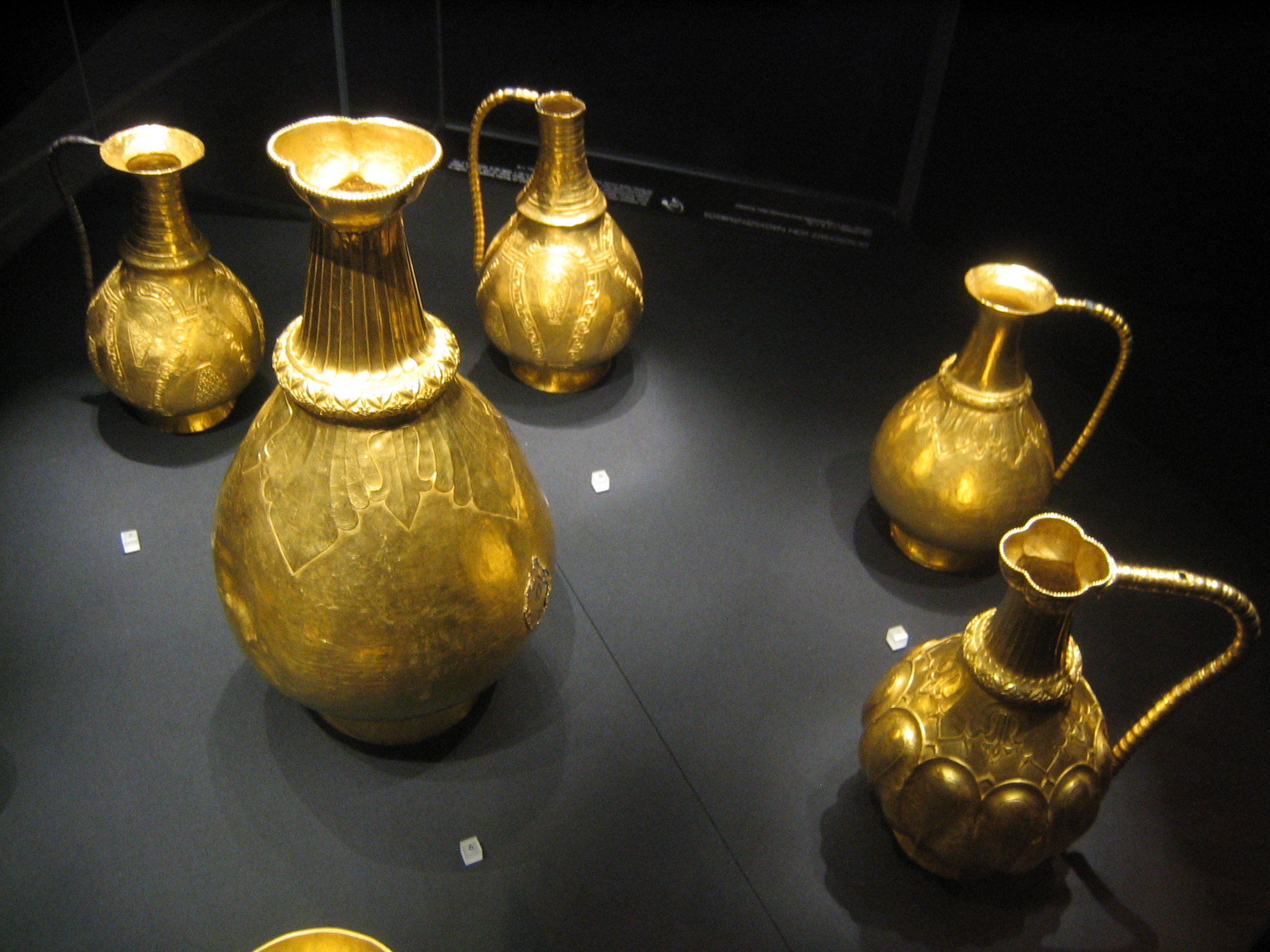
Part of the treasure of Treasure of Nagyszentmiklós in the Kunsthistorisches Museum.

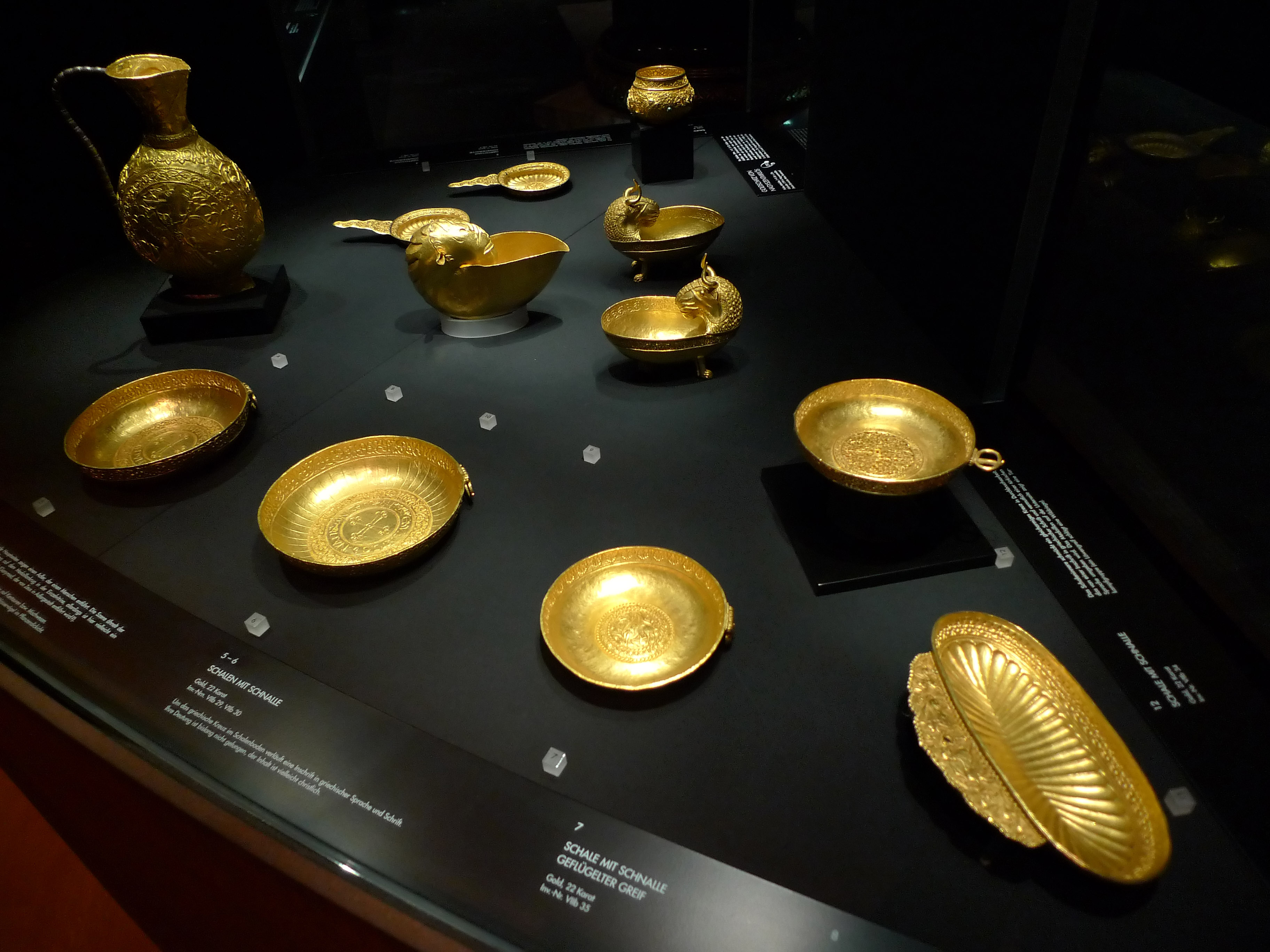
Another part of the treasure.

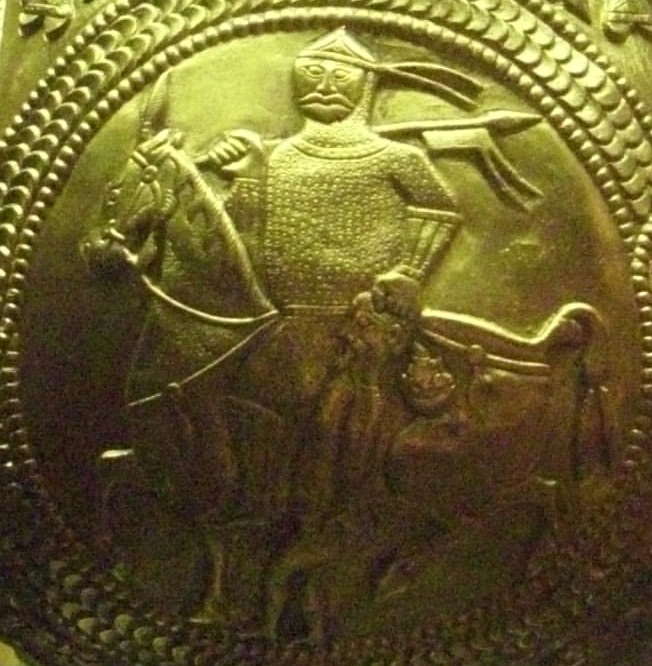
Asiatic looking horseman and his captive on the Ewer from Nagyszentmiklós. The design of the face is similar to some Kurgan stelae found in Kyrgyzstan.

The Treasure of Nagyszentmiklós (Hungarian: Nagyszentmiklósi kincs; German: Schatz von Nagyszentmiklós; Romanian: Tezaurul de la Sânnicolau Mare) is an important hoard of 23 early medieval gold vessels, in total weighing 9.945 kg (about 22 lbs), found in 1799 near Nagyszentmiklós, Kingdom of Hungary (German: Groß-Sankt-Niklaus, today Sânnicolau Mare, Romania), meaning "Great St Nicholas". After the excavation, the treasure was transferred to Vienna, the dynastic capital of the Habsburg Monarchy. Ever since, it has been in the possession of the Kunsthistorisches Museum there, where it is on permanent display.

A wide range of views continue to be held as to the dating and the origins of the styles of the pieces, and the context in which they were made, which may well vary between the pieces. Unusually, the inscriptions on some pieces have increased the complexity of the arguments rather than reduced them. In 2008 Romanian officials asked the Austrian government for the treasure's repatriation.

In the 19th century the treasure was widely regarded in Hungary as originating with precursors of the Hungarian people, and played a notable part as an icon of Hungarian nationalism. In particular the gold cup with a bull's head facing back over the bowl was known as the "Cup of Attila" - Attila the Hun having died in 453.

The treasure, consisting of 23 gold vessels and variously dated from the 6th to the 10th century, was found on 3 July 1799 by Neru Vuin, a Serbian peasant farmer, in the vicinity of Nagyszentmiklós (Sânnicolau Mare). The figure of the "victorious Prince" dragging a prisoner along by his hair (see figure on the right) and the mythological scene at the back of the golden jar, as well as the design of other ornamental objects, show close affinities with finds at Novi Pazar, Bulgaria and at Sarkel, Russia. Stylistically, Central Asian, Persian-Sassanid and Byzantine influences are predominant.

== Inscriptions ==
On one of the vessels in the hoard there is an inscription written in the Greek alphabet which reads:

ΒΟΥΗΛΑ ΖΟΑΠΑΝ ΤΕΣΗ ΔΥΓΕΤΟΙΓΗ ΒΟΥΤΑΟΥΛ ΖΩΑΠΑΝ ΤΑΓΡΟΓΗ ΗΤΖΙΓΗ ΤΑΙΣΗ
bouēla zoapan tesē dygetoigē boutaoul zōapan tagrogē ētzigē taisē

Today almost all scholars share the view that the text is written in a Turkic language, but it has not been deciphered and the exact classification of the language has been a subject of debate. It has been often compared with the Turkic Bulgar language of the First Bulgarian Empire, attested on several 8th-9th century inscriptions written in Greek letters. More recently Eugene Helimski argued the language is close to Proto-Tungusic, but this proposal was rejected by Marcel Erdal as far-fetched.

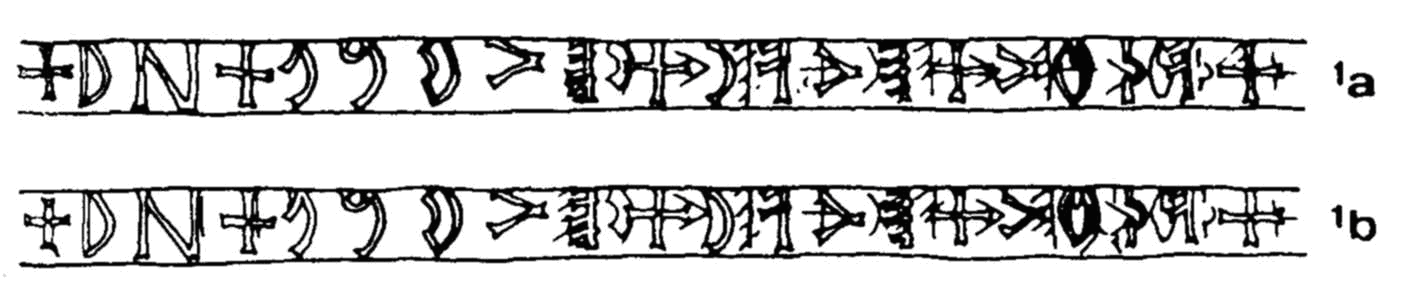
"Number 8 Bow inscription" from the Treasure of Nagy Szent Miklos; runiform script

There is another inscription in the Greek language. Also, there are several other very short inscriptions in a runiform script which are also likely to be in a Turkic language, but these are very brief and also have not been deciphered.

== Cultural context ==
The cultural milieu or milieux in which the objects in the treasure were created, assembled and deposited remains controversial, with the debate often influenced by nationalistic concerns. Some researchers believe that the treasure belonged to the voivode Ahtum of Morisena (today Cenad in Romania), a descendant of the voivode Glad. The treasure would come from inheritances, from the tax on the transport of salt on the Mureș, from plundering expeditions and from gifts. The treasure would have been buried in Sânnicolau Mare upon the death of Ahtum.

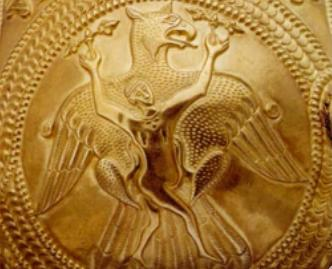
Illustration on the treasure of Nagyszentmiklós depicting a scene of the divine Garuda bird lifting up a human body, or alluding to Ancient Greek mythology with Zeus transforming into animals to rape a man or woman. Some claim to be similar to one in the Álmos legend from the Hungarian mythology: Emese's dream of the Turul bird.

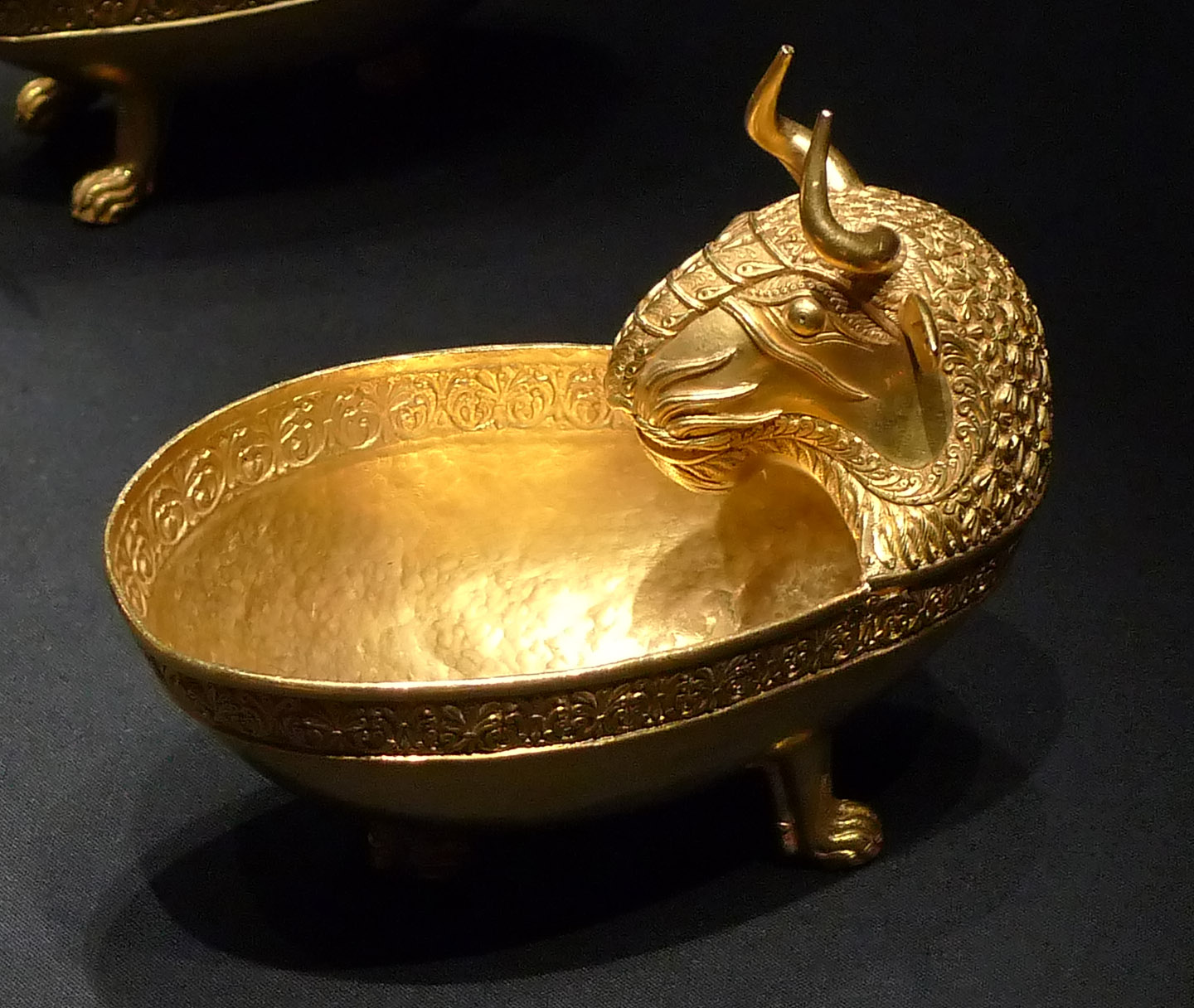
A bull's head bowl from the treasure; this piece is known in Hungary as "Attila's Cup".

=== Avar ===
Scholars have connected the treasure with the Avar Khaganate. The newest research shows it is closely related to the Avar culture.

=== Byzantine ===
According to a Greek text of a vessel, the treasure may have a Byzantine Empire origin. In a study of a Romanian scientist, the text of a vessel has to be read as ΔEA[=ΔIA] YΔATOC ANAΠΛYΣON A<YT˃ON EIC PHTON[=PEITON] OMAYLON. Meaning: "With water clean it [the disc] in the neighboring [sacred] stream". Also, he wrote the treasure belonged to Ahtum, a voivode of Banat.

=== Magyar or Bulgar ===
As noted above, close affinities have been recognized between the Nagyszentmiklós material and that found at Novi Pazar and in Khazaria. Archaeologists in both Hungary and Bulgaria consider these affinities to support theories of ancient migration between regions. Both were allied with Khazars for a period. The treasure gives some idea of the art of the First Bulgarian Empire, Hungarian and Khazar states. According to Professor Nykola Mavrodinov (based on Vilhelm Thomsen), the script on vessel number 21 is in Bulgar, written in Greek letters, surrounding a cross, and reads, "Boyla Zoapan made this vessel. Butaul Zoapan intended it for drinking."

=== Khazar ===
One school of Hungarian archaeologists maintains that the tenth century gold- and silversmiths working in Hungary were Khazar. When the Magyars migrated to Pannonia in 896, some Khazar tribes, known as the Khavars, came with them to their new homes. The Khavars were skilled gold and silversmiths.

=== Persian ===
Khazar art is believed to be modelled on Persian-Sassanide art patterns. The Soviet archaeologist O. H. Bader emphasized the role of the Khazars in the spread of Persian-style silverware towards the north. Some of these works may have been re-exported by the Khazars, as middlemen; others were imitations made in Khazar workshops, ruins of which have been found near the ancient Khazar fortress of Sarkel. The Swedish archaeologist T. J. Arne mentions ornamental plates, clasps and buckles of Sassanide and Byzantine inspiration, manufactured in Khazaria or territories under their influence, being found as far afield as Sweden. Thus, the Khazars, Magyars and Bulgars could have been intermediaries in spreading Persian-Sassanide art in Eastern Europe.

== See also ==
- Scythian art
- The Avar Treasure
- Pereshchepina Treasure
- Preslav Treasure
- Rhyton
- Griffin
- Simurgh/Simorgh
- Garuda
- Sasanian art
- Oxus Treasure
- Ganymede (mythology)

== Sources ==
- Alemany, Agustí (2009). "From Central Asia to the Balkans: the title *ču(b)-pān". In Allison, Christine; Joisten-Pruschke, Anke; Wendtland, Antje (eds.). Daēnā to Dîn: Religion, Kultur und Sprache in der iranischen Welt. pp. 3–12.
- Bálint, Csanád (2010). "Avar goldsmiths' work from the perspective of cultural history". In Adams, Noel; Entwistle, Chris (eds.). Intelligible Beauty: Recent Research on Byzantine Jewellery. pp. 146–160.
- Daim, Falko (2003). "Avars and Avar archaeology. An introduction". In Goetz, Hans Werner; Jarnut, Jörg; Pohl, Walter (eds.). Regna and gentes: the relationship between late antique and early medieval peoples and kingdoms in the transformation of the Roman world. pp. 463–570.
- Erdal, Marcel (1988). "The Turkic Nagy-Szent-Miklós inscription in Greek letters". Acta Orientalia Academiae Scientiarum Hungaricae. 42: 221–234.
- Erdal, Marcel (2007). "The Khazar language". In Golden, Peter B.; Ben-Shammai, Haggai; Róna-Tas, András (eds.). The World of the Khazars. pp. 75–108.
- Fiedler, Uwe (2008). "Bulgars in the Lower Danube region. A survey of the archaeological evidence and of the state of current research.". In Curta, Florin; Kovalev, Roman (eds.). The other Europe in the Middle Ages: Avars, Bulgars, Khazars, and Cumans. pp. 151–236.
- Göbl, Robert; Róna-Tas, András (1995). Die Inschriften des Schatzes von Nagy-Szentmiklós: Eine paläographische Dokumentation.
- Helimski, Eugene A. (2000). "On probable Tungus-Manchurian origin of the Buyla inscription from Nagy-Szentmiklós". Компаративистика, уралистика: Лекции и статьи. pp. 268–277.
- Róna-Tas, András (1999). Hungarians and Europe in the early Middle Ages.
- Thomsen, Vilhelm (1918). Une inscription de la trouvaille d'or de Nagy-Szent-Miklós (Hongrie).
