= Pisa Griffin =

Medieval Islamic bronze sculpture

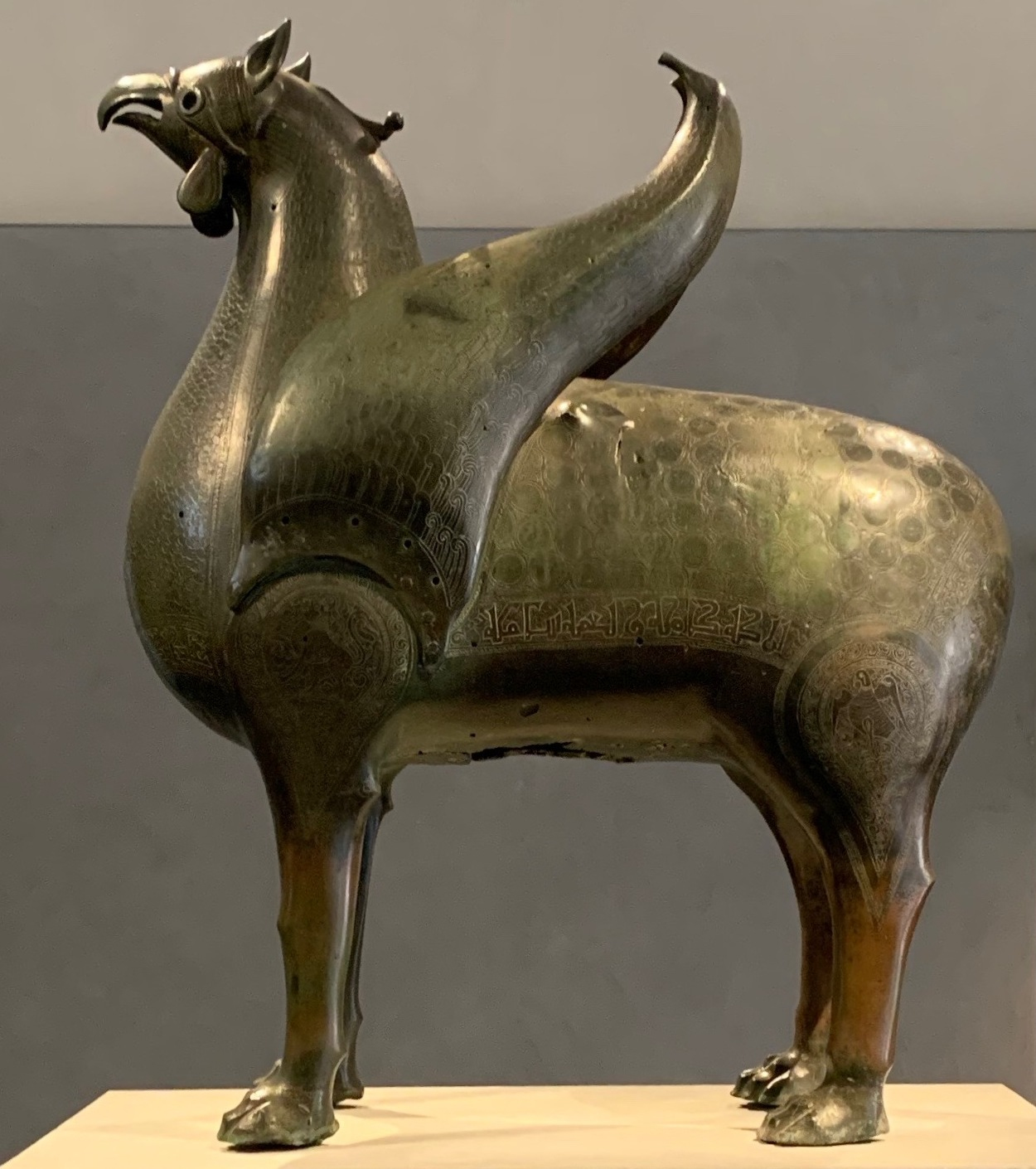
The Pisa Griffin, in the Pisa Cathedral Museum; H. 107 centimetres (42 in); L. 90 centimetres (35 in); W. 46 centimetres (18 in)

The Pisa Griffin is a large bronze sculpture of a griffin, a mythical beast, that has remained in Pisa, Italy since the Middle Ages despite its Islamic origin, specifically late 11th or early twelfth century Al-Andalus (Islamic Spain). It is now in the Museo dell'Opera del Duomo (Cathedral Museum) in Pisa.

Carbon dating has determined that the griffin was made sometime between 1085 and 1110 AD. The Pisa Griffin is the largest medieval Islamic metal sculpture known, standing over three feet tall at 1.07 metres (42 in). It has been described as the "most famous as well as the most beautiful and monumental example" of a tradition of zoomorphic bronzes in Islamic art.

The griffin seems at first a historical anomaly given its elusive origin and multiplicity of possible uses, including a fountainhead or musical instrument. However, its possible origin can be approximated by comparing it to similar sculptures of its time, namely the animalistic sculptures and fountains of Al-Andalusian palatial settlements. Furthermore, the griffin may share a similar method of construction, and therefore origin, as the Al-Andalusian fountainheads based on the metallic contents of its bronze alloy.

== Description ==
The griffin has the head of an eagle, ears like those of a horse, wattles of a rooster, wings, and the body of a lion and other mammals’ limbs and toes. Its dimensions are 107 centimetres (42 in) X 90 centimetres (35 in) X 46 centimetres (18 in). The statue is made of cast bronze (i.e. copper alloy). Its wings are cast separately and held in place by rivets. It is largely hollow inside. There is an engraved decoration, including an Arabic inscription in Kufic letters around the beast's chest and flanks saying: "Perfect benediction, complete wellbeing, perfect joy, eternal peace and perfect health, and happiness and good fortune (?) for the owner."

The wings are decorated with stylized feathers, the chest with overlapping semi-circular scales, and the back with a pattern of plain circles enclosed in two rings on a textured background. At the top of each leg there is a more elaborate, inverted teardrop-shaped zone or cartouche where arabesques surround an animal. Lions are depicted on each front leg. Birds, presumably eagles, are depicted on each rear one.

There are three openings leading to the interior of the statue that contains fittings given various interpretations, described below. There are openings at the mouth, the rear – perhaps for a missing tail – and a larger one under the belly. Inside is "a globular ‘cup’ made of bronze, open towards the belly and soldered on the back with a fine piece of the same metal."

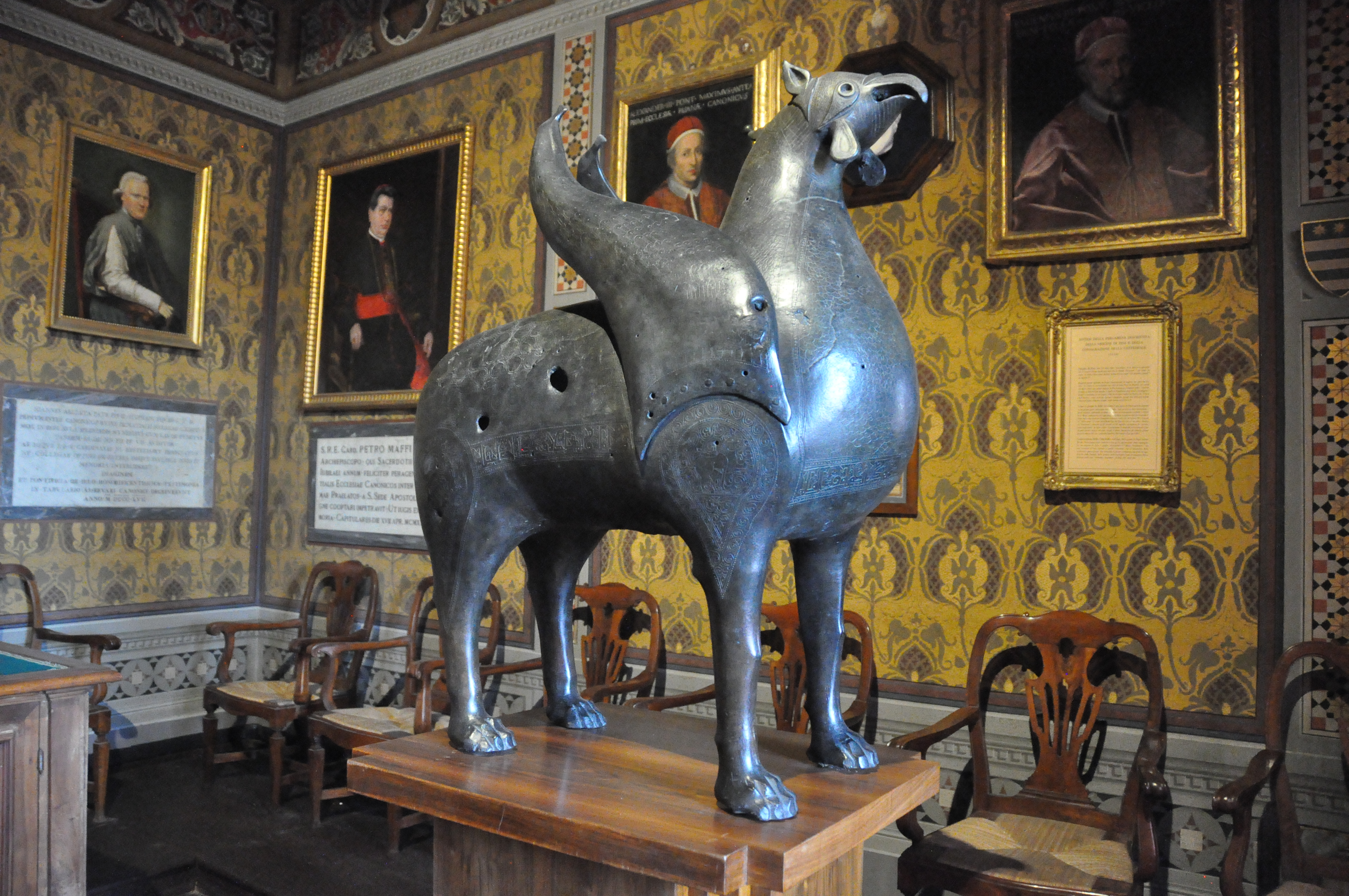
The Pisa Griffin in the Pisa Cathedral's chapter house, 2014

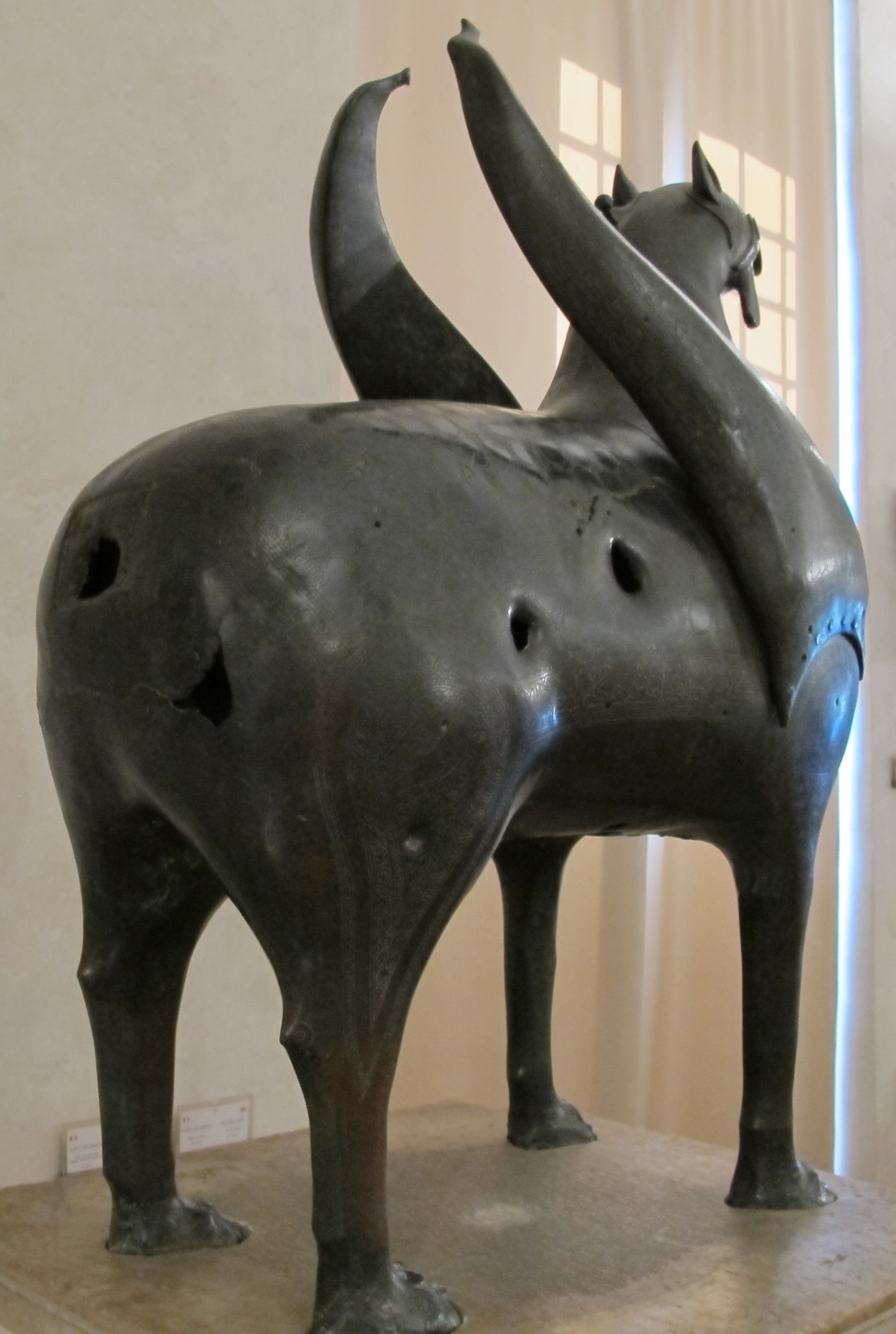
View of the Pisa Griffin from the posterior end

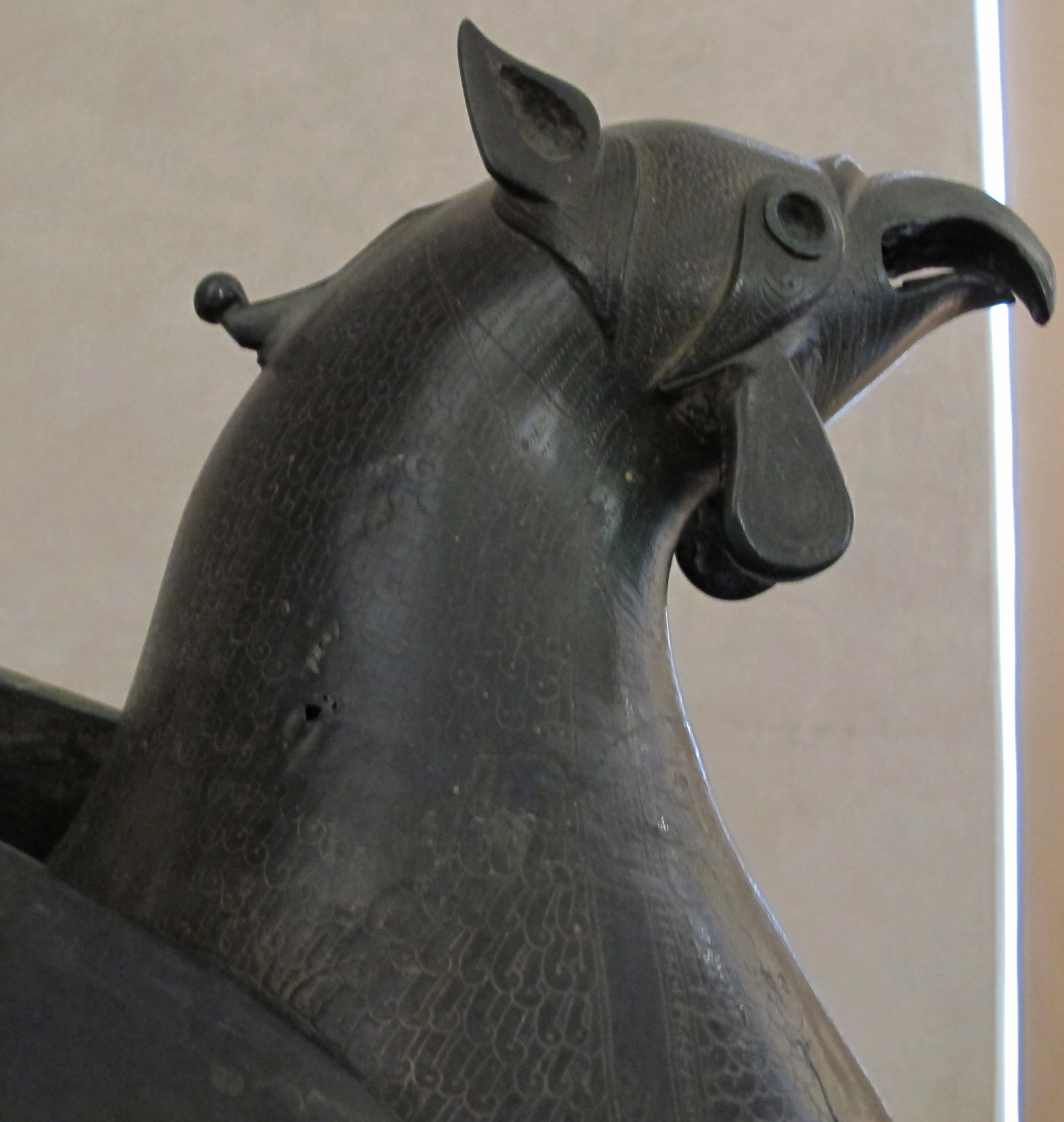
Detail of the head of the Pisa Griffin

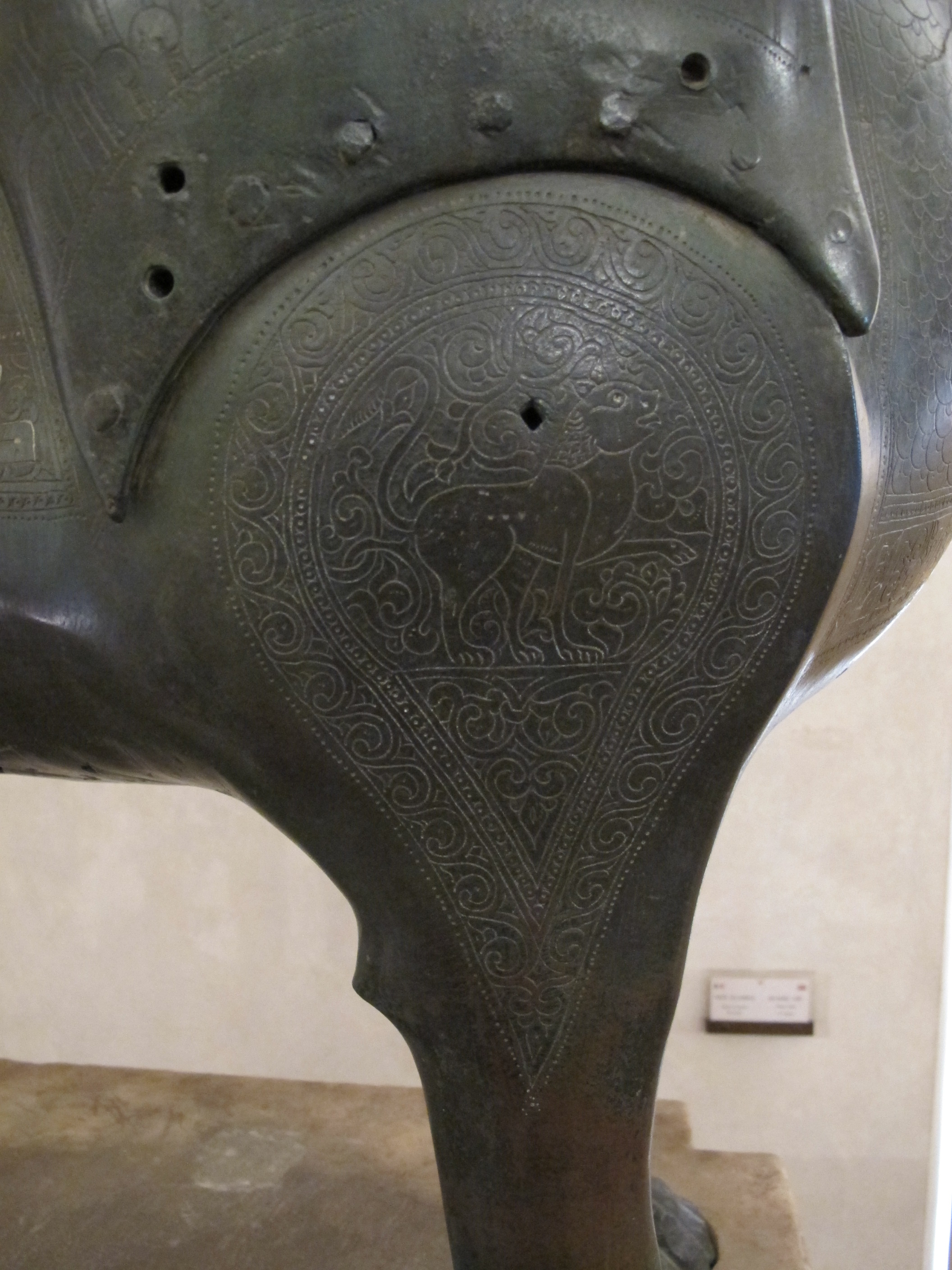
Detail of the ornamentation on the front leg of the Pisa Griffin

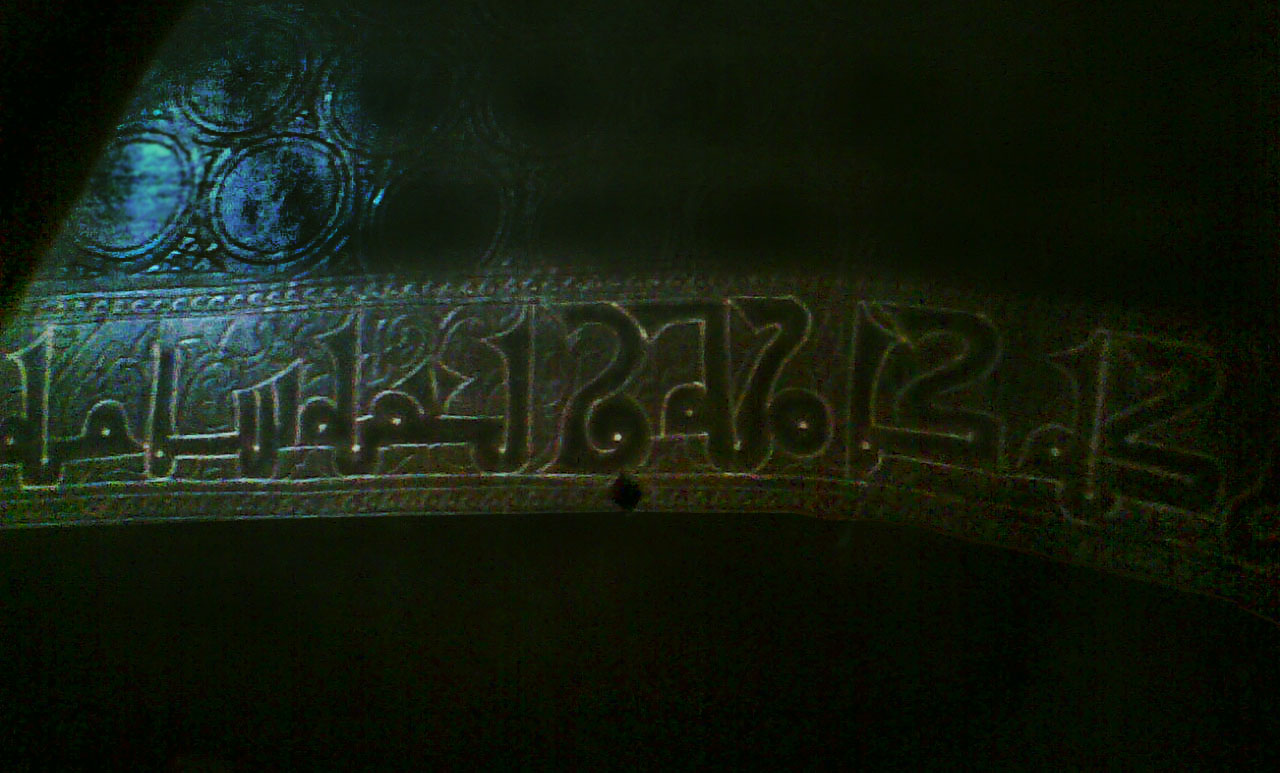
Detail of the Kufic inscription on the Pisa Griffin

== Original use and history ==
=== Fountainhead ===
The griffin is the largest of a group of surviving Islamic bronze animals, most of which are much smaller and functioned as aquamaniles and incense-burners (images below) A much smaller group of middle-sized works contains several that were clearly fountainheads, probably originally arranged in circular groups facing outwards, similar to the famous stone lions (image below) still in residence at the Alhambra in Granada. Among the group of non-portable early Islamic bronze animals, two have been clearly made as fountainheads: a lion, perhaps from Sicily and rather later in date, and a 10th-century hind (female deer) from Cordoba. The latter sculpture of a female deer is said to be a companion of the "Cordoba Stag,” the best known of the group after the Pisa Griffin. This hind statue stands 61.6 centimetres (24.3 in) high, although lacking the antlers it is presumed to have originally had, and dates to ca. 950–1000. It is in the Museo Arqueológico Provincial de Cordoba and was found in the ruins of the large palace-city Madinat Al-Zahra outside Cordoba.

A different hind fountainhead found in Madinat Al-Zahra is in the National Archaeological Museum of Spain in Madrid (image below). The 16th-century historian al-Maqqari noted there were “...marble basins with elaborate spouts at the palace of Madinat al-Zahra” adorned different animal heads. “One of these was surrounded by twelve gold animal sculptures which spewed water from their mouths." Smaller pieces include the "Kassel Lion," signed by Abd Allah Mattial from the 10th or 11th century (Kassel Museum), and the "Monzón lion" (image below) in the Louvre.

It has been suggested that the griffin may have been placed in a fountain with water spouting from its mouth. However, this theory has been recently questioned by some historians, because the griffin does not contain any remnants of a hydraulic system needed to push water through its mouth.

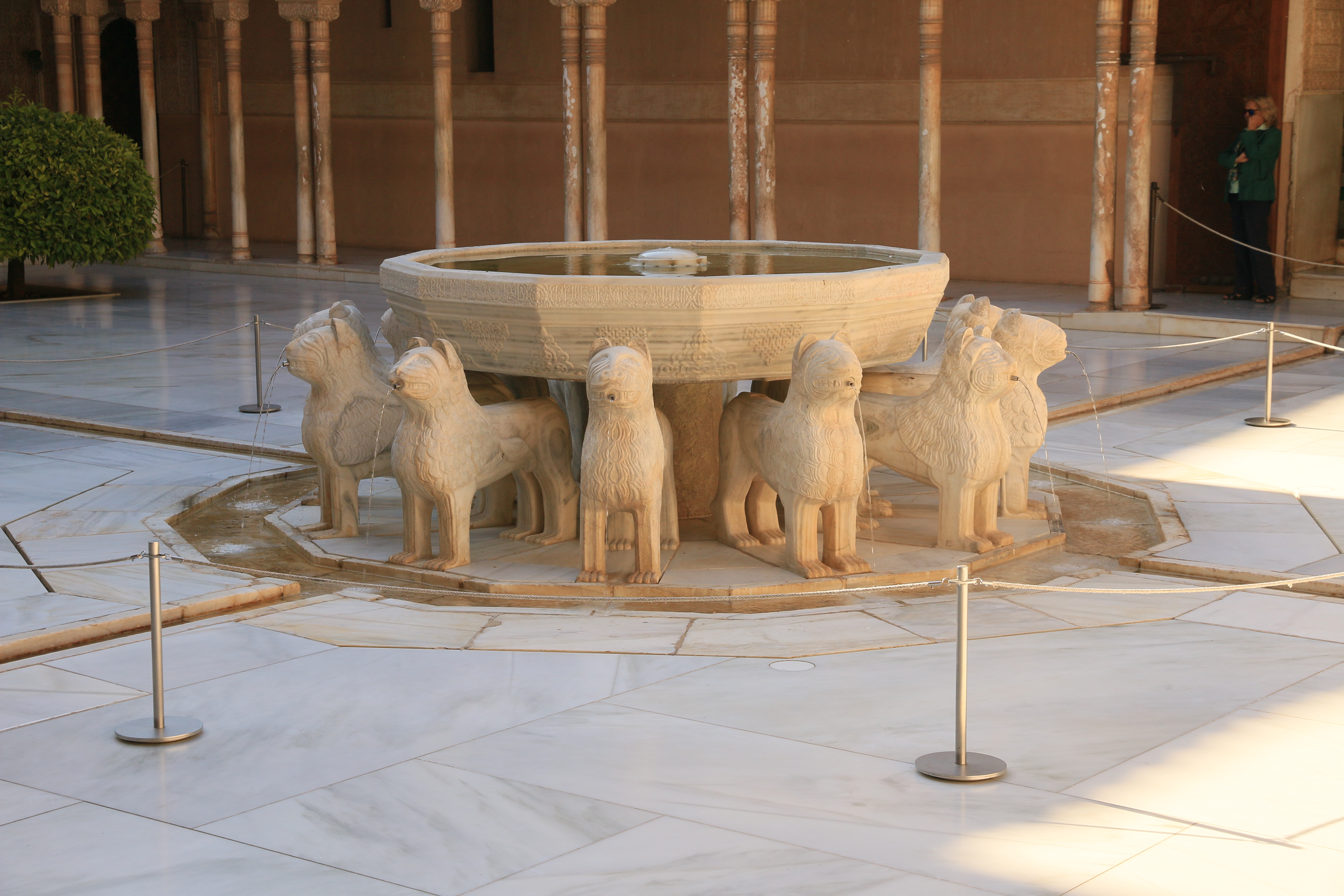
The Lion Fountain in the Court of the Lions in the Alhambra, 14th century

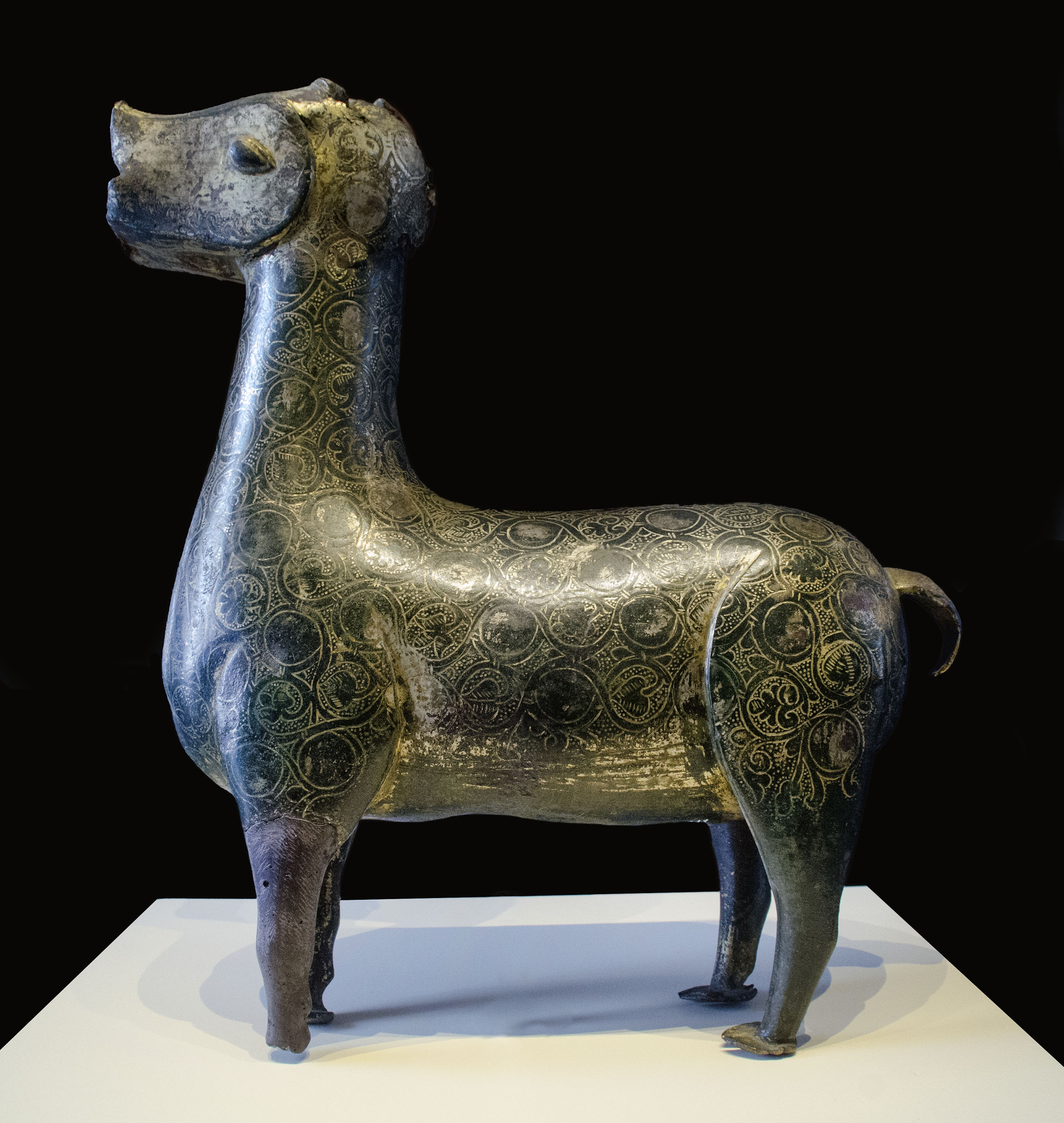
10th century fountainhead in the form of a hind, from Madinat Al-Zahra, Madrid. 32.3 cm (12.72 in) high

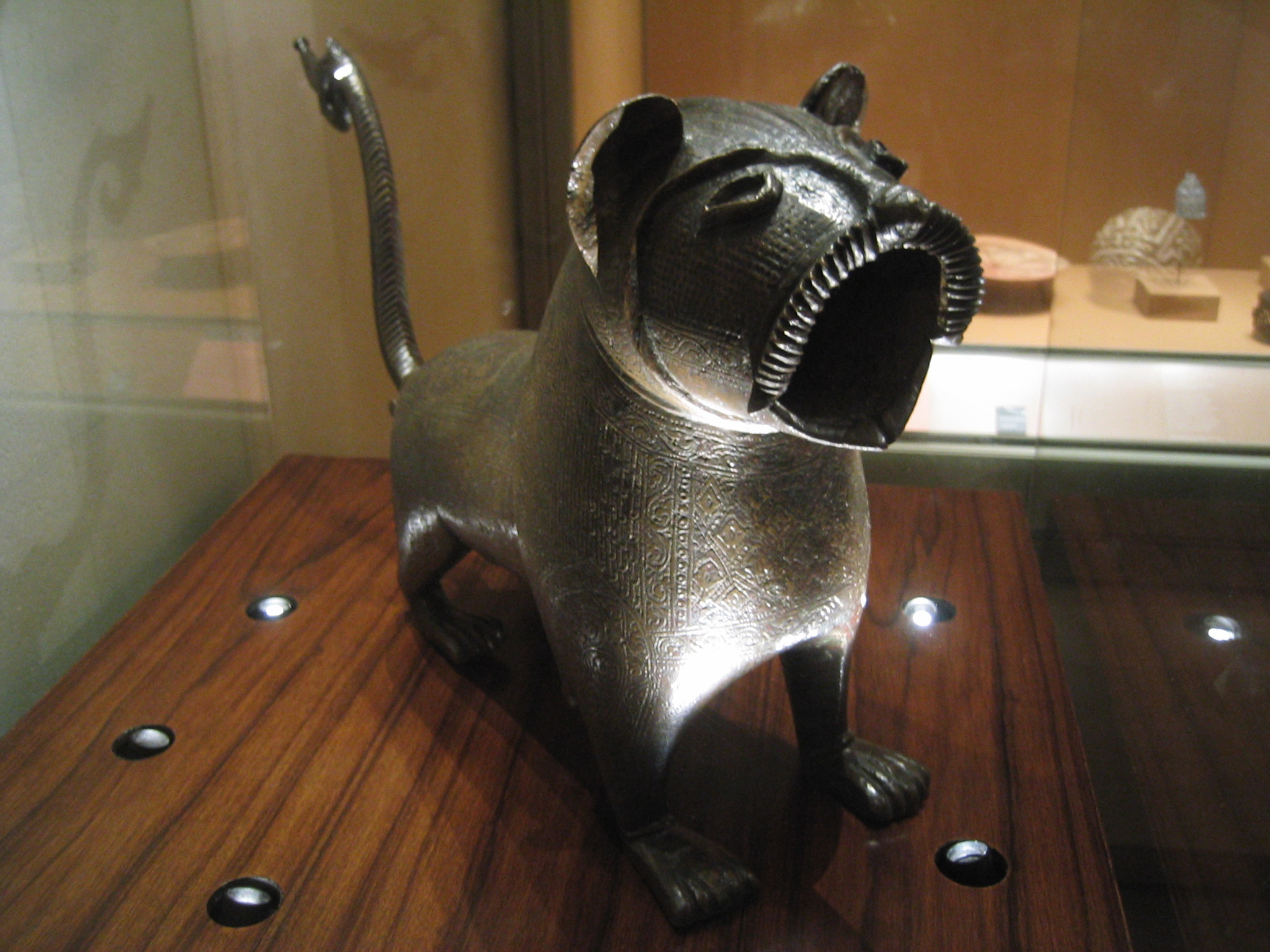
The Monzón Lion, fountainhead, 12th-13th century, now in the Louvre

=== Musical instrument ===
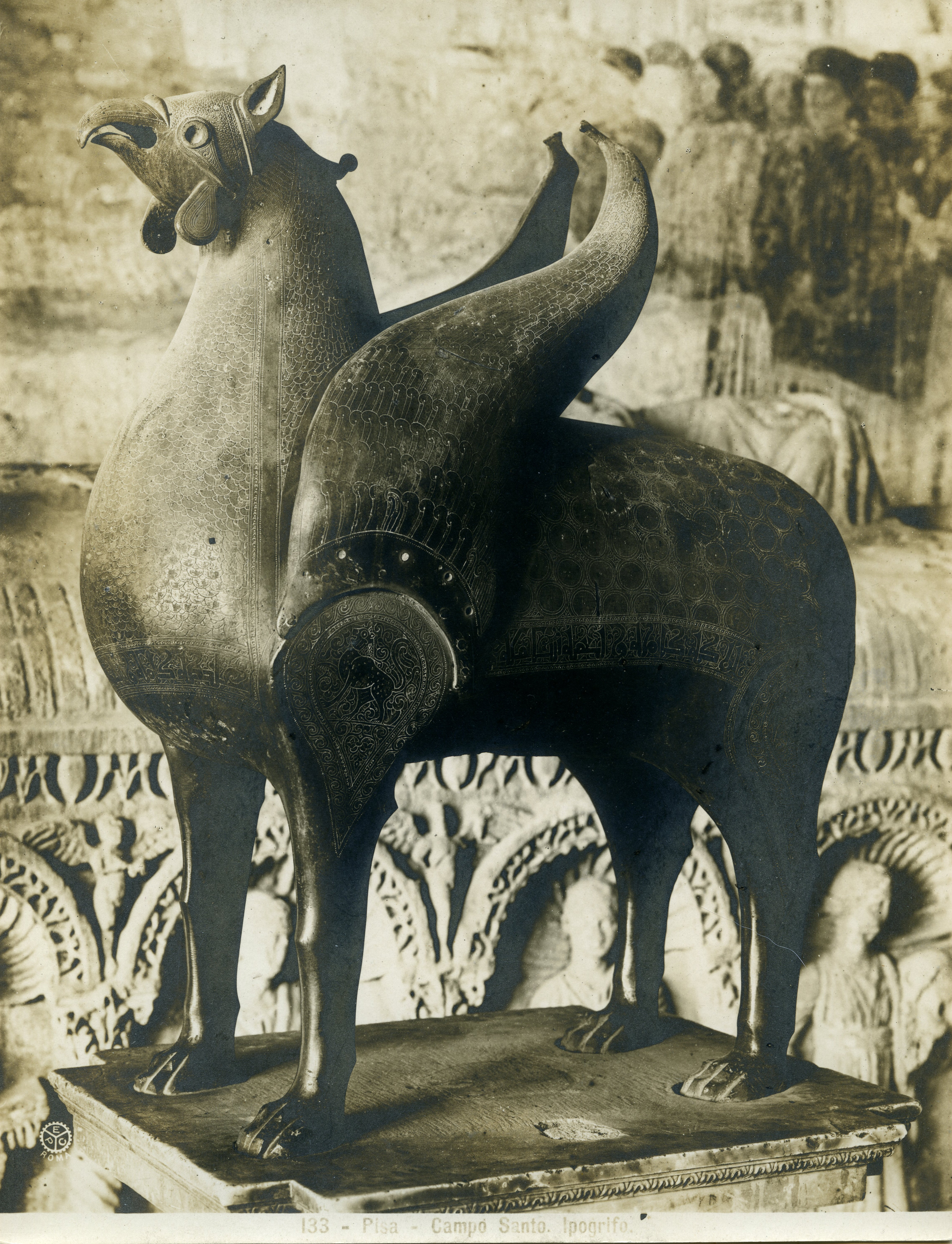
Photo of the Pisa Griffin in the Camposanto in Pisa c. 1890-1900

A more recent theory, based on the remains of its internal features, is that both the griffin and a smaller lion in the Metropolitan Museum of Art in New York, were designed to emit noises from their mouth, as a kind of mechanical toy known to have been enjoyed in Islamic courts. The interior of the griffin is hollow except for a smaller bowl-shaped vessel found towards the back of the griffin. Its hollow interior and metal exterior, along with this internal vessel, could have made the griffin resonant.

Furthermore, the griffin later was placed at the top of Pisa Cathedral, allowing the wind to blow through the structure and produce various musical sounds. According to written historical accounts by al-Hamadani and Yaqut, the Ghumdan Palace in Sanaa also had large brass statues of lions that emitted the sound of a “wild beast roaring” when the wind blew in through the backside of the lion and out through its mouth. Moreover, it is theorized that the mechanism by which the griffin likely produced sound was similar to a bagpipe. The internal bowl-shaped vessel would have supported the air bag while maintaining pressure. A reed would have been placed near the mouth of the griffin, allowing for wind to move in from the backside, through the internal vessel and airbag, past the reed, and out of the mouth. This would require a firm seal between the airbag, reed, and the pipe leading to the griffin’s mouth, all contained within the griffin’s body. Thus, this theory also provides an explanation for the flawed casting of the griffin, because the internal instrumental structure would not have required an un-cracked external structure to produce sound.

=== Original Islamic context ===
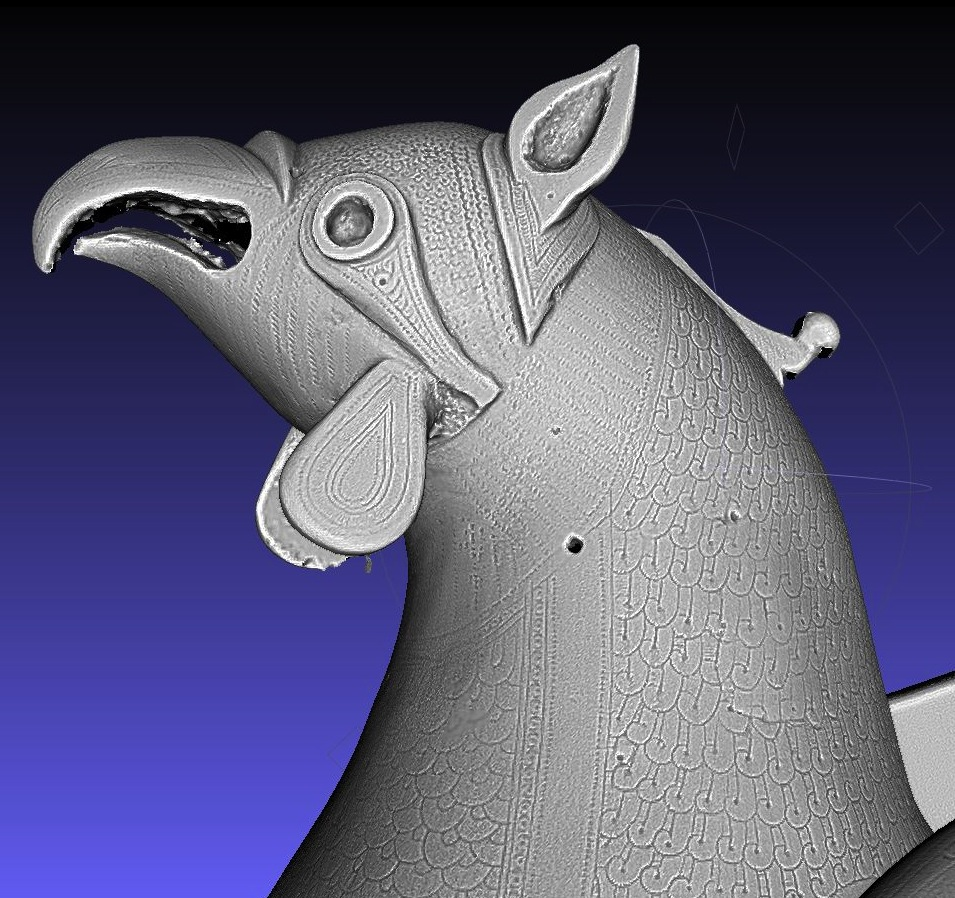
A rendering of the 3D scanned model showing the details of the carving on the griffin head

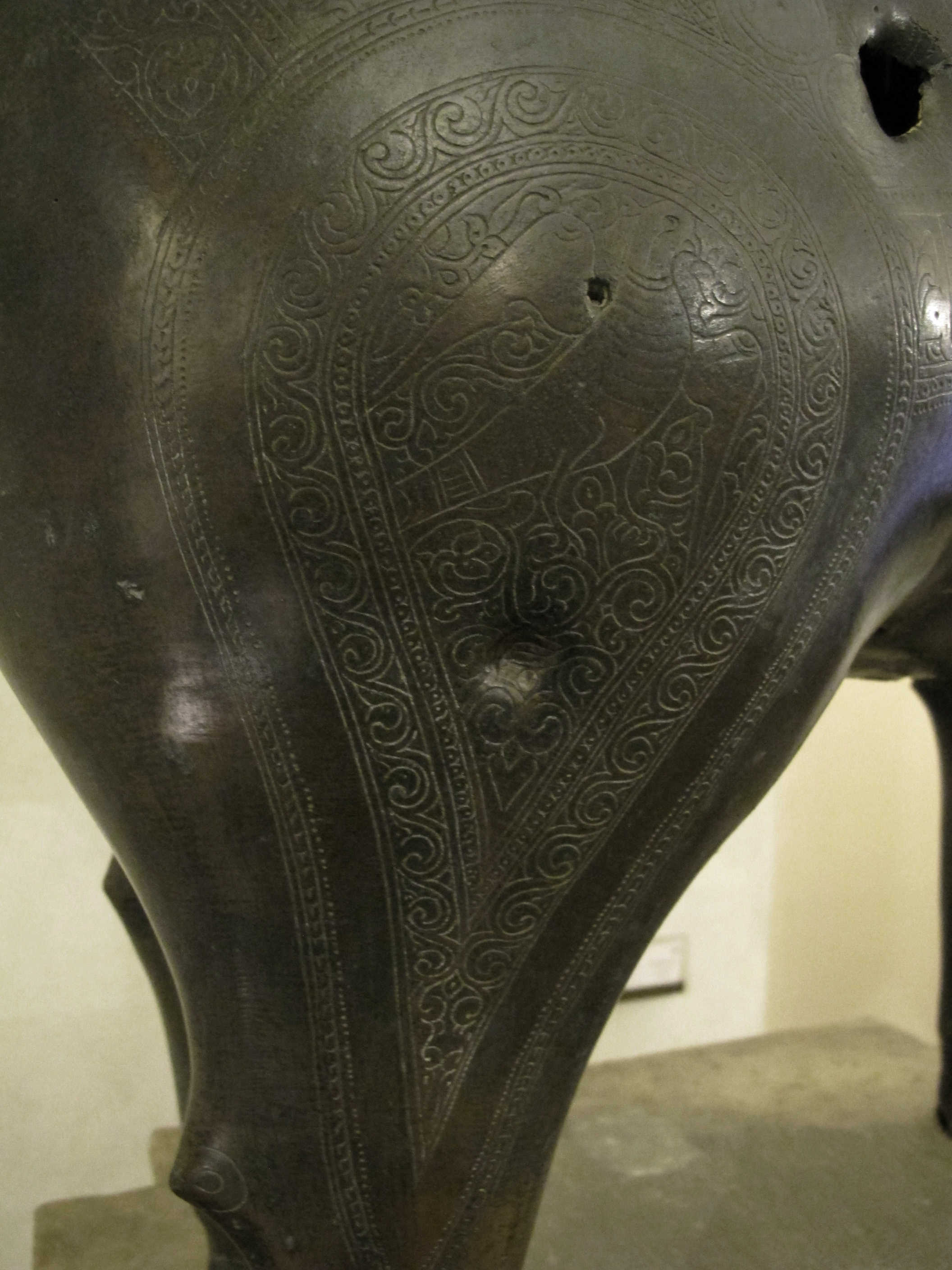
Detail of cartouche on the leg of the Pisa Griffin

Locating the area where the griffin was made has been the subject of considerable debate concerning the regions of Al-Andalus, Egypt, Sicily, North Africa and other places suggested at various points. Debates focus on a group of bronzes of one sort or another that are often thought to have been made in the same area. Al-Andalus remains the most popular choice, but South Italy or Sicily are also possible locations of origin. However, Egypt seems to have largely fallen out of contention.

Robert Hillenbrand suggests that the fantastic nature of the griffin and other statues of animals was influenced by a belief that such mythical beasts were less likely to be regarded as idolatrous than lifelike animal forms. All representations of animals in a religious context were against strict interpretations of Islam. The three dimensional representations, especially large sculptures such as these, were especially likely to be accused of skirting idolatry and were therefore rare in religious Islamic art. In the Hermitage Museum, an aquamanile of a cow and calf being attacked by a lion later had the throats of the animals cut with a sharp groove, apparently to make it clear that they are dead. Oleg Grabar suggests that the engraved decoration may be "translations into cheaper bronze" of inlays and enameling found on gold and silver Byzantine objects. The circular patterns on the griffin's back, as well as the cartouches on each leg, were derived from textile designs.

=== Arrival in Pisa ===
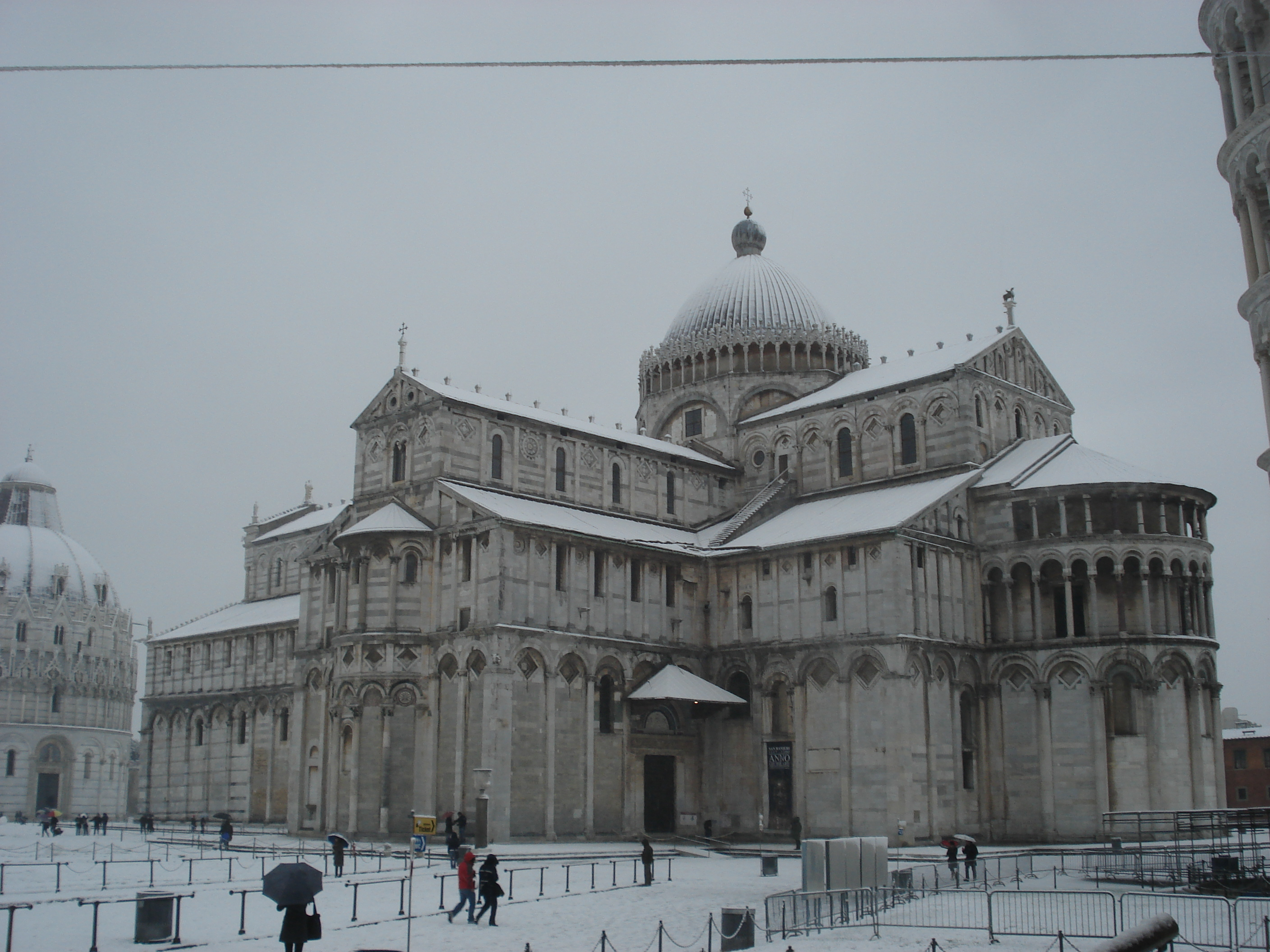
The replica Griffin above the apse of the Pisa Cathedral (to the right) in snow, with the Baptistry to the left and the Tower of Pisa on the right

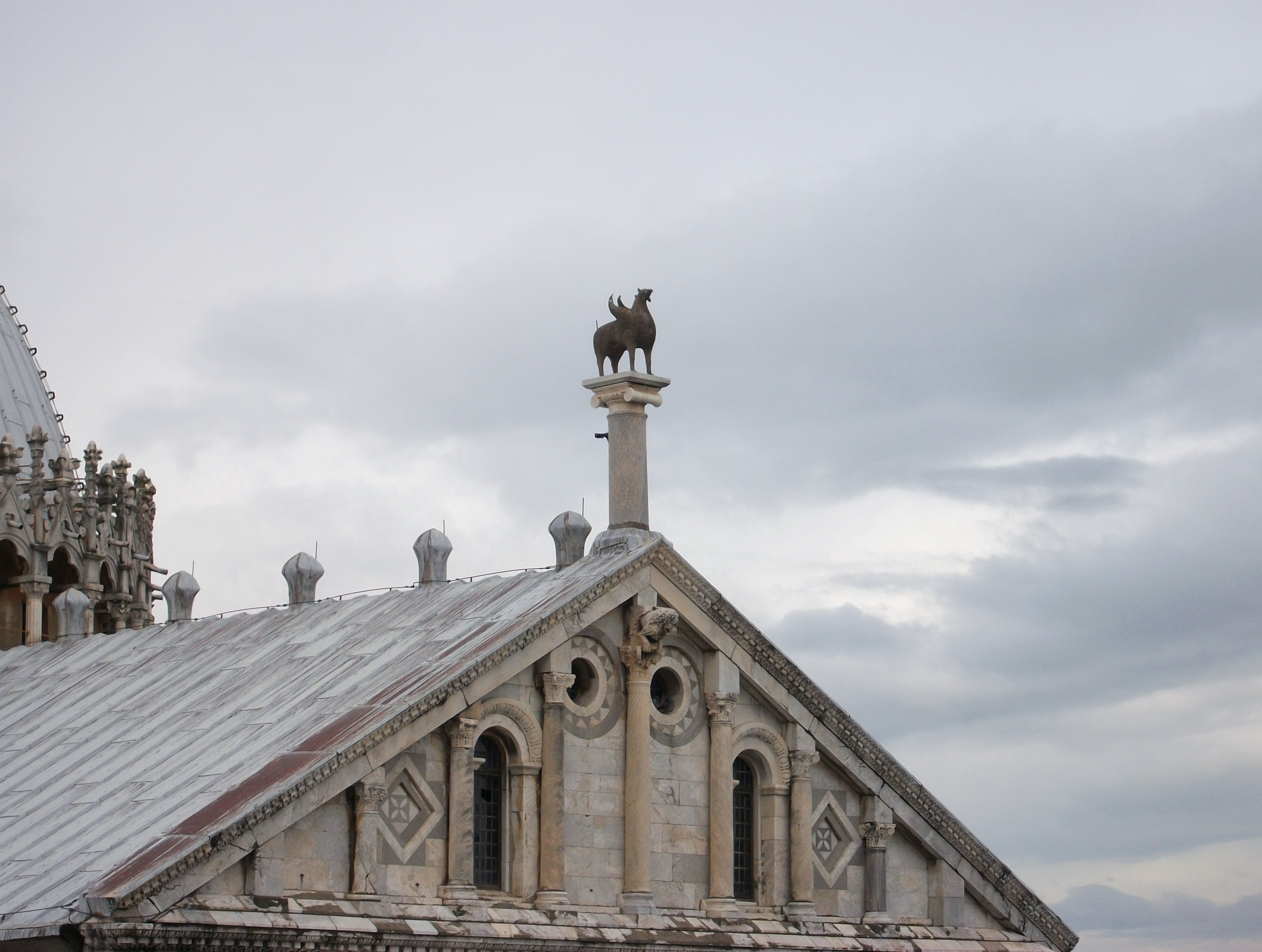

The griffin is generally agreed to have arrived in Pisa at some point during the late 11th or early 12th century and may have been a spoil of one of the many successful "wars" or raids conducted by the Republic of Pisa against Islamic states. In this period, Pisa was at the height of its power as a maritime republic and held prominence over surrounding Mediterranean and Tuscan communities. The successful attack in 1087 on Mahdia in modern Tunisia, the capital of the local Zirid dynasty, is one candidate. Another strong candidate is the Pisan campaign against the Saracens of the Balearic Islands in Spain between 1113 and 1115.

The griffin was placed on a platform atop a column rising from the gable above the apse at the east end of the Pisa Cathedral, probably as part of the original construction that started in 1064. This was a very prominent position, albeit one that could not be seen up close. Thus, its Islamic origins were forgotten over the centuries. According to later local legends, it was said to be either a Roman sculpture, a local medieval creation, a spoil of war from 1115, or a miraculous finding from when the foundations of the cathedral were excavated. Because the griffin is made of bronze, Pisans may have drawn similarities between this statue and surviving bronze Roman sculptures, reminding Pisans of their imperial past. Large-scale European bronze casting at this period specialized in fonts and pairs of doors, of which there is a fine Romanesque pair with reliefs in the same museum.

=== Later movements ===
In 1828 the griffin was removed and placed in the Cathedral Museum, with a replica later replacing its original position. Once viewed closely, the Kufic inscription made its Islamic origins visible, although Murray's Handbook for Italy in 1861 fantasized that, "Though Arabian, it is as clearly not Mahometan, and it is most probably an idol or a talisman belonging to the Druzes, or some other of the tribes who even still secretly reject the doctrines of the Koran." Debate about the place and date of its creation continues to the present-day.

In Pisa, the griffin joined other trophy pieces of prestigious bronze sculpture displayed at the heart of the civic space like (later) the Horses of St Mark and the lion on a column in the Piazzetta in Venice. It forms a part of probably the most famous ensemble of Romanesque architecture in Italy in the Piazza dei Miracoli, looking at the Leaning Tower of Pisa with the Baptistry behind it.

In recent years the griffin has travelled to exhibitions in Berlin in 1989, Granada, New York in 1992, and Brigham Young University in Provo in 2012.

There is an ongoing interdisciplinary project on the Pisa Griffin, related metalwork, and material culture in collaboration with Oxford University, Pisa University, CNR-ISTI in Pisa, Opera della Primaziale Pisana, and the Istituto Superiore per la Conservazione ed il Restauro. Among the outcomes of the project there will be an accurate digital 3D model of the statue obtained through 3D scanning, videos, a book and an exhibition.

== See also ==
- Anqa - Arabian mythological bird of prey
- Huma bird - Iranian mythological bird
- Turul - Hungarian mythological bird of prey
- Konrul - Turkic mythological creature similar to a phoenix
- Simurgh - Iranian mythological bird
- Sphinx - mythological creature with a human head and lion body from Ancient Greece and Ancient Egypt
- Buraq - supernatural horse-like creature which served as the mount of Muhammad during Isra and Mi'raj
