= Rukh =

Rukh may refer to:

== Arts and entertainment ==
- Rukh, an ancestor god of the Dwarfs in the Warhammer fantasy fictional universe
- Rukh, the "home of souls" and source of all natural phenomena in the world of Magi: The Labyrinth of Magic
- Rukh, the jungle, in Kipling's first written story about Mowgli, "In the Rukh"
- Rukh (film), a 2017 Indian film
- Rukh (Star Wars), a character in the Star Wars universe

== Places and buildings ==
- MCS Rukh, a municipal stadium in the Ivano-Frankivsk city park, Ukraine
- Rukh, Iran, a village in Hormozgan Province, Iran

== Other uses ==
- People's Movement of Ukraine or Rukh, a Ukrainian political party
- Roc (mythology) or Rukh, a mythological giant bird
- Rook (chess), from Persian رخ (transliterated rukh or rokh)

== See also ==
- Lalla Rookh (disambiguation)
- Rokh (disambiguation)
- Shahrokh (disambiguation)
