= Shahrokhi =

Shahrokhi may refer to

- Shahrokhi (surname)
- Kahnuj-e Shahrokhi, a village in Iran
- Nehzat-e Olya, or Shahrokhi, a village in Iran

== See also ==
- Shahrokh (disambiguation)
