= Rokh =

Rokh (رخ) may refer to:

== Geography ==
- Jolgeh Rokh District (Persian: بخش جلگه رخ)

== People ==
- Shah Rokh (Persian: شاهرخ) (c. 1730–1796), Persian ruler of India.
- Rok Hwang, South Korean fashion designer, founder of the fashion label Rokh.

== Games ==
- Rokh (video game), upcoming science fiction video game
- Rook (chess) from Persian رخ (transliterated rokh or rukh)
- Rokh, a battleship from EVE Online's Caldari State, specializing in railguns

== See also ==
- Rukh (disambiguation) (Persian روخ)
