= Luanniao =

Mythological bird in East Asian mythology

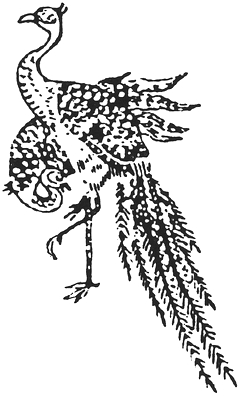
- Luan drawing, Wakan Sansai Zue, Japan

Chinese name
- Traditional Chinese: 鸞
- Simplified Chinese: 鸾
Transcriptions
Standard Mandarin
- Hanyu Pinyin: luán
- IPA: [lwǎn]

Vietnamese name
- Vietnamese alphabet: loan
- Chữ Nôm: 鸞

Korean name
- Hangul: 란
- Hanja: 鸞
Transcriptions
- Revised Romanization: ran
- McCune–Reischauer: ran

Japanese name
- Kanji: 鸞
- Hiragana: らん
Transcriptions
- Romanization: ran

Luan (traditional Chinese: 鸞; simplified Chinese: 鸾; pinyin: luán; Wade–Giles: luan²), also known as luanniao (simplified Chinese: 鸾鸟; traditional Chinese: 鸞鳥; pinyin: luánniao; lit. 'Luan bird'), is a mythological bird in East Asian mythology. The name is sometimes reserved for males, while female luan are called jīnjī (金雞; lit. golden chicken). The luan is sometimes referred as simurgh by western sinologists when they translate the Chinese term luan; however, they do not refer to the same bird creature and is therefore an inappropriate translation of the term. It is also sometimes inappropriately translated as roc and phoenix. The luan is one of the birds which have been deified in ancient China. It is also sometimes confused with the fenghuang by western scholars.

== Appearance ==
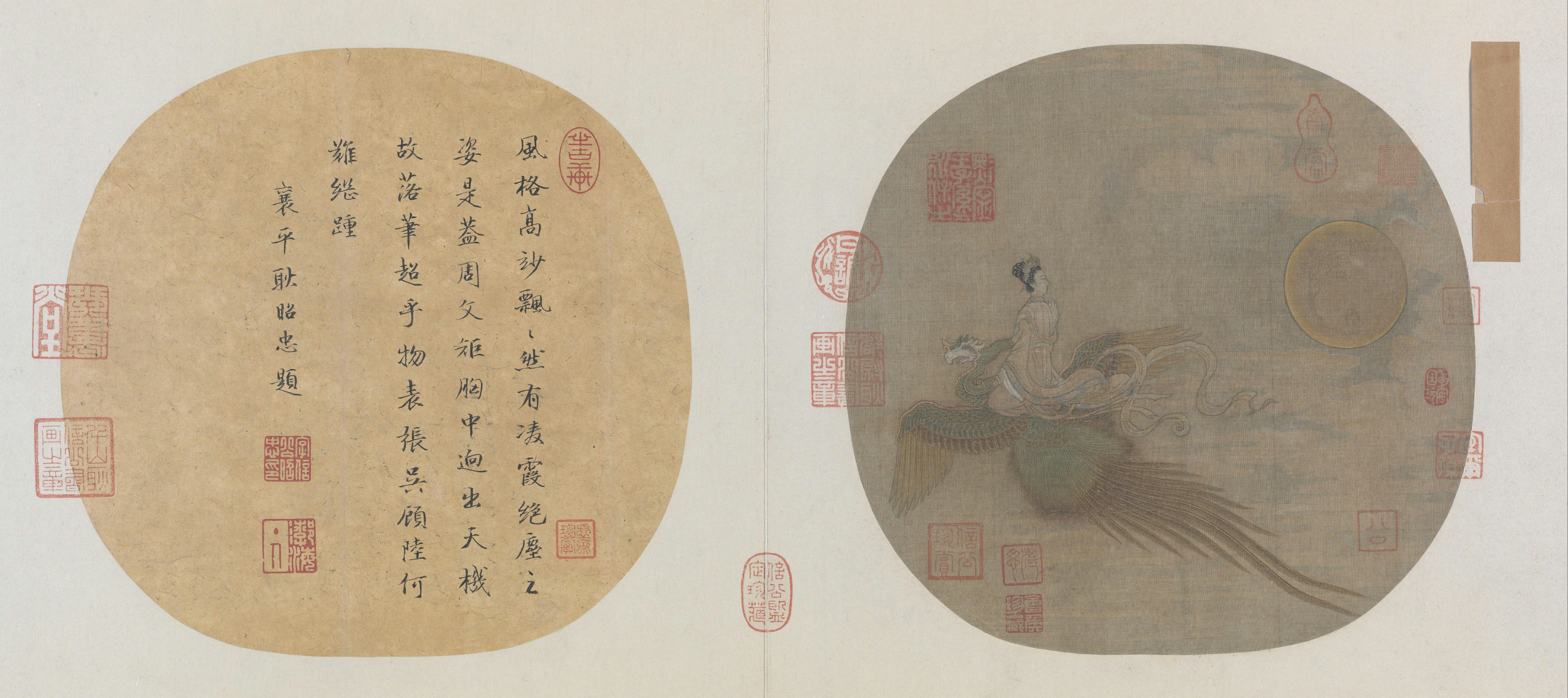
Female Immortal riding a luán-bird, Song dynasty.

Chapters 7 and 16 of the Classic of Mountains and Seas describes the luan as inhabiting paradisiacal areas where it sings spontaneously. In Chapter 11, its features are reminiscent of the fenghuang. It is said to trample on snakes while wearing one on its breast. In other sections, it is mentioned as carrying a shield. In the Classic of Mountains and Seas, the luan is described as being one of the three five-coloured birds, along with huang and feng bird. The luan would sing while the feng would dance to accompany it.

The Shuowen Jiezi defines the bird as born from the sperm of Chìdì. It is red in colour with five-coloured markings. Its body is shaped like that of a chicken. It sings in the five standard pitches and appears when hymns of praise are sung to rulers. It also described the luan as being "the essence of divine birds".

The Sancai Tuhui states that the bird is the transformation of a divine spirit.

The Japanese Wakan Sansai Zue of the Edo period further states that due to the viscosity of the luan's blood, it could be used as an adhesive for attaching strings to musical instruments.

By the Six Dynasties period, the luan became associated with the Queen Mother of the West.

== Origin ==
It has been suggested that the luan's origins are the argus pheasant, peacock, or golden pheasant.

== Meaning ==
Like the fenghuang, a sighting of the luan indicates an omen of peace. An early legend thought to be from the Warring States period states that the luan was presented as a tribute by northwestern tribes to King Cheng of Zhou as a symbol of submission to his virtue.

== See also ==
- Fenghuang
- Phoenix
