= Rukh, Iran =

Rukh روخ
- Village
- Location within Iran
- Coordinates: 26°40′42″N 57°48′16″E
- Country: Iran
- Province: Hormozgan
- County: Bashagard
- Bakhsh: Gowharan
- Rural District: Gowharan

Population (2006)
  - Total: 21
- Time zone: UTC+3:30 (IRST)
  - Summer (DST): UTC+4:30 (IRDT)

Rukh (Persian: روخ, also Romanized as Rūkh) is a village in Gowharan Rural District, Gowharan District, Bashagard County, Hormozgan Province, Iran. At the 2006 census, its population was 21, in 5 families.
