= Rokh (video game) =

- Developer: Nvizzio Creations
- Publisher: Darewise Entertainment
- Engine: Unreal Engine 4
- Platforms: Microsoft Windows; OS X
- Genres: Science fiction, Survival
- Mode: Multiplayer

Rokh is a sandbox, science fiction, multiplayer survival game, the development of which was announced on December 10, 2015. The game was originally under development by independent game company Nvizzio Creations before Nvizzio dropped out of development for Rokh due to a dropped contract. Rokh was published by Darewise Entertainment. The game is set in the future on the planet Mars, and will contain crafting and survival elements. The game was developed using Unreal Engine 4. The game was made available for early access on May 16, 2017. Development for Rokh was suspended in 2018 due to a lack of financial backing and revenue.

== Development ==
Rokh was the first game created by the partnership between newly founded game development company Nvizzio Creations and publisher Darewise Entertainment. Since the development of the game was announced on 10 December 2015, several images and trailers have been released giving hints about the gameplay of Rokh. The game's development was led by two former Assassin's Creed developers, Benjamin Charbit and Marc Albinet.

Further information about Rokh's gameplay was revealed by the developers at the East Penny Arcade Expo in 2016. A demonstration tutorial video was also shown. The game begun a Kickstarter campaign to raise funds for its development in early May 2016.

After Nvizzio Creations dropped out of the development of Rokh, Darewise stated that the game's state was not as expected and required new developers and "game doctors" to see success.

== Gameplay ==
The game is open world and is set far into the future, when scientific advances have changed the universe dramatically. Despite this, the game contains hints of realism. Rokh tasks players with staying alive after crash-landing on the planet of Mars. Survival in the game will rely heavily on cooperation between the players and the crafting of new objects and materials which are helpful for survival, such as housing, medicine and robots. The weather in Rokh changes constantly, and the conditions force the players to continue adapting to the new environments. Real-world problems are also present, such as hunger and thirst. The territory in Rokh is harsh to create a feeling of a need for survival, with features such as the atmosphere and radiation to add to the challenge. In addition to this, the game requires players to keep a close eye on the power of their suit and their oxygen levels in order to stay alive.

It was revealed later in development that community created content would play a huge part in the development of Rokh. The game's developers announced that they planned on eventually opening up a full Steam workshop, and allowing players to create modifications for the game.

=== Controls ===
WASD is used to move. Left-click is used to perform combat actions. Pressing "E" is used to interact with objects in your environment such as supply caches. Space is pressed to jump and held to use the jet-pack.

=== Salvaging ===
Supply Caches can be found in the environment. The color designates the type of loot found in the cache: green represents consumables such as oxygen, food, or rad shields; yellow represents basic crafting materials such as bars or rods; and purple represents consumables.
