= Anqa =

Legendary bird from arab mythology

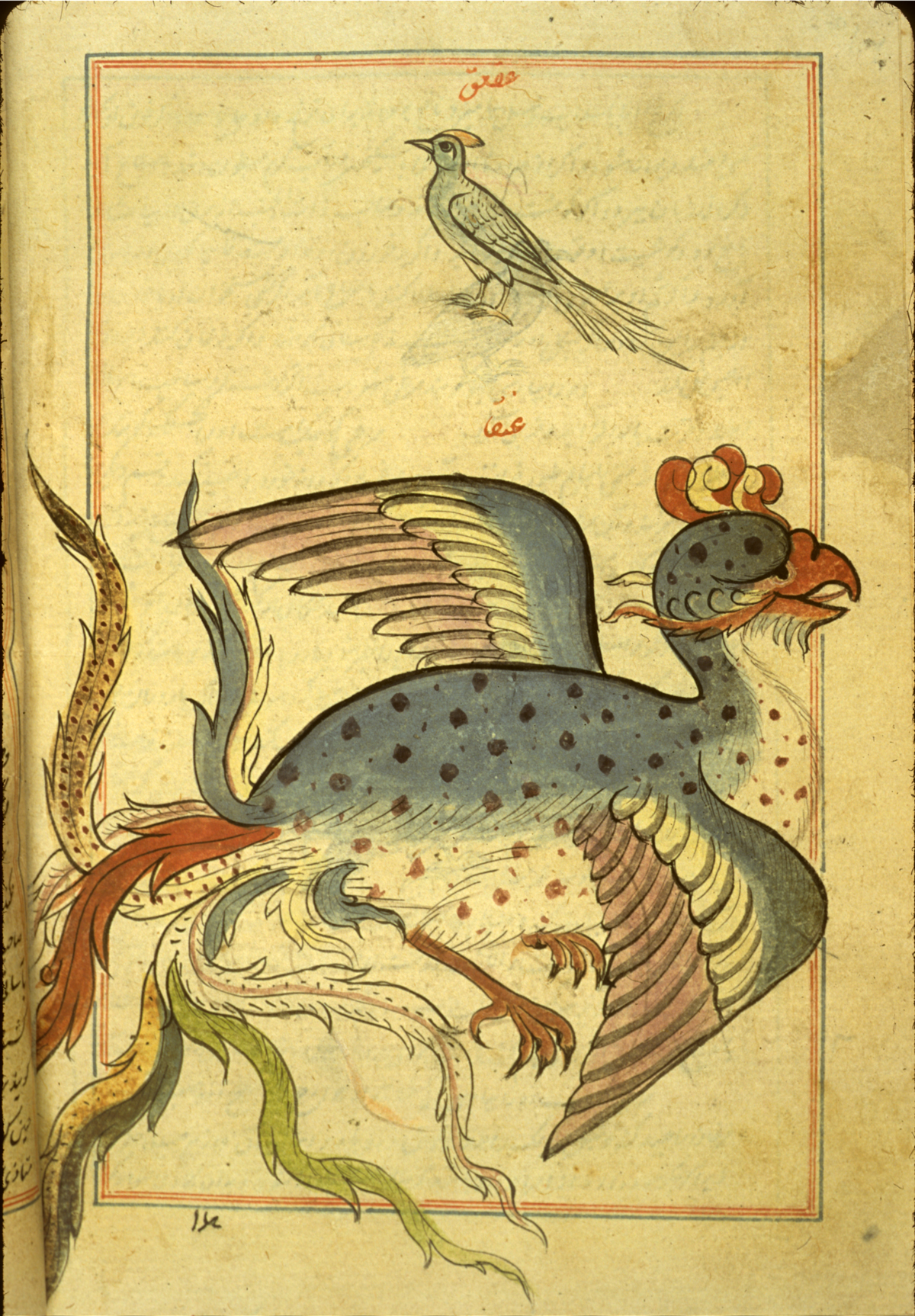
Qazwini's depiction of the anqa in The Wonders of Creation

Anqa (Arabic: عَنْقَاء, romanized: ʿanqāʾ), also spelled 'Anqa', or Anka, or Anqa Mughrib or Anqa al-Mughrib (Arabic: العَنْقَاء المُغْرِب), (Note: Arabic: مُغْرِب, romanized: Mughrib, lit. 'the one who throw people down toward west or during sunset') is a golden mysterious or fabulous female bird in pre-Islamic Arab mythology. She is said to fly far away and only appear once in ages. However, it is also said that she can be found at the place of the setting of the sun.

== Etymology and notes ==
The word ʿanqāʾ is the feminine form of ʾaʿnaq (أعنق) meaning "long-necked" and also "long and thick in the neck". This probably implies that the bird resembles a heron or crane (or other long-necked birds) or simply has a large strong neck like an eagle or falcon (or other raptors) with which she was identified by some. The word muḡrib has a number of meanings signifying "strange, foreign", "distant, remote", "west, sunset", "desolated, unknown" and "white, dawn" and expresses the enigma as well as unreality associated with the creature.

ʿAnqāʾ, however, is also related to ʿanāq (عناق "misfortune, hard affair") and was, along with ʿanqāʾ muḡrib used to mean a calamity. It was so because the bird was said to be originally created with all perfections but became a plague or scourge and was killed.

One of the earliest accounts of the Anqa was narrated in a 9th-century book called Dala'il al-Nubwah. In this book is narrated a tale where King Solomon talked about fate and destiny with the birds, with the Anqa objecting to this conviction.

== Characteristics ==
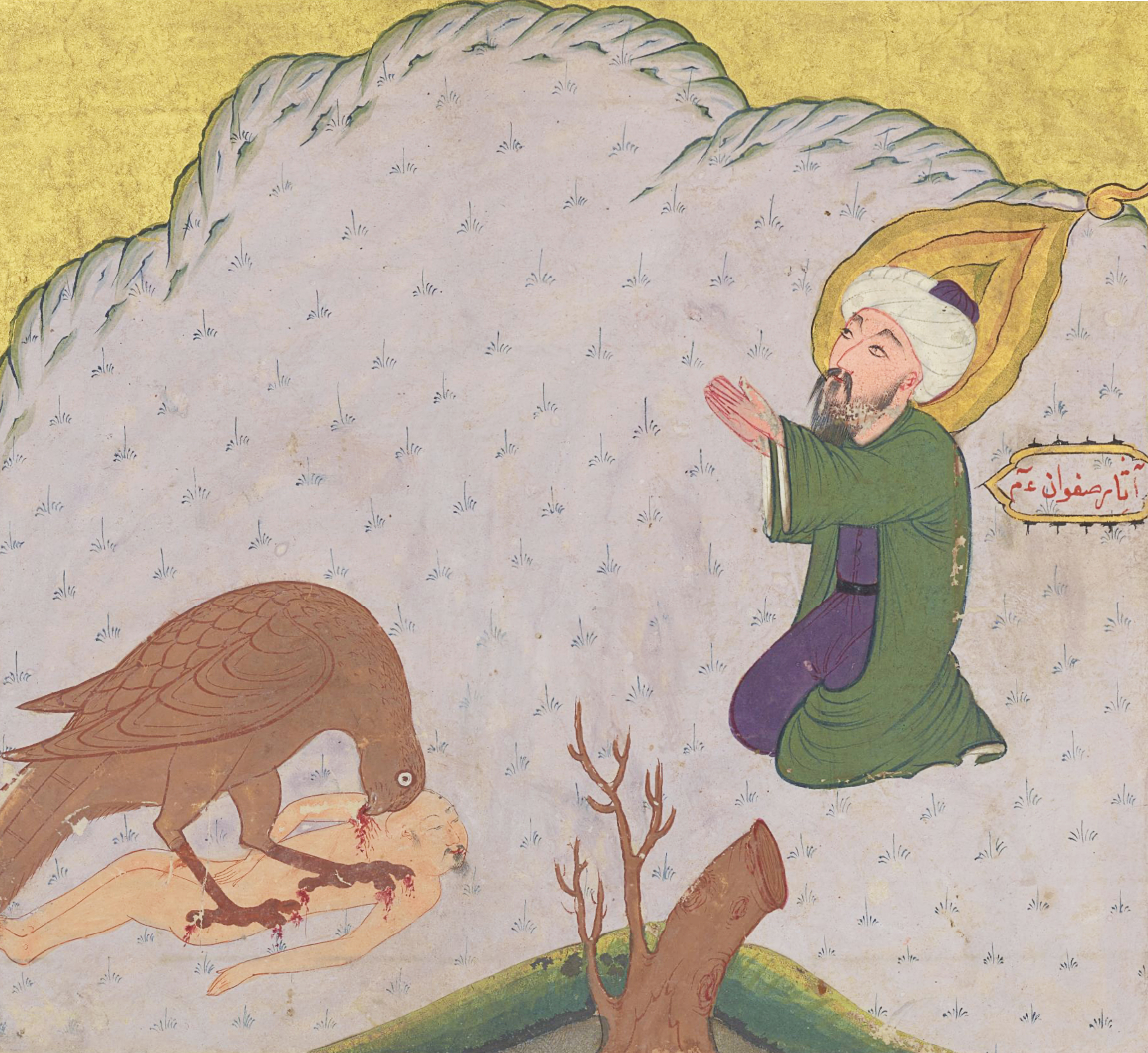
Islamic sahabi (companion) of the Islamic prophet Muhammad Safwan ibn Umayya sits in prayer as he watches the Anqa devour a man.

The Anqa was described as very beautiful and colorful with a long neck, human face, four pairs of wings, (Note: Arabic: و في زمن موسى عليه السلام طائرة اسمها العنقاء لها أربعة أجنحة من كل جانب, lit. 'In the time of Moses the bird named Al-Anqa having a four wings on either sides.') and some resemblance with every living being (Note: Arabic: و كانت العنقاء طائرة عظيمة الخلق، لها وجه إنسان، و فيها من كل حيوان شبه, lit. 'In it there were numerous birds one of which was the Anqa, large in body, having a long neck, and a human face. it has some resemblance with every living being.') and a whiteness in its neck. (Note: Arabic: والعَنْقاءُ: طائِرٌ لم يَبْقَ في أيدي الناس من صِفتها غيرُ اسمِها. ويقالُ بل سُمِّيَتْ به لبياضٍ في عُنقِها كالطَّوق., lit. 'Anqa: A bird that people no longer have any information about, but its name. It is said, it was rather named as such, because of some whiteness surrounding its neck as a collar.') Zakariya al-Qazwini in this cosmological book Aja'ib al-Makhluqat "The Wonders of Creation" comments about the Anqa as the kin of birds that lived alone on Mount Qaf and a wise bird with experience gained throughout many ages and gives admonitions and moral advice. Qazwini also says that the bird lives for 1700 years, mating at 500 years of age and that the chick, after the egg breaks, stays inside and only comes out after 125 years.

It is said that Anqa eats nothing except elephants and large fish. (Note: Arabic: فذهب الله به إلى جزيرة بعض جزائر البحر المحيط تحت خط الاستواء و هي جزيرة لا يصل إليها الناس، و فيها حيوانات كثيرة كالفيل و الكركند و الجاموس و النمر و السباع و جوارح الطير و العنقاء لا تصيد منها لأنهم تحت طاعتها، و إذا أتى بشيء من الصيد يأكل منه و الباقي تأكل منه الحيوانات التي تحت طاعتها، و لا تصيد إلا فيلًا أو سمكًا عظيمًا أو تنينًا, lit. 'And then God took her to one of the islands of the surrounding sea below the equator and it's an unreachable island that has many animals like elephants, lobsters, buffaloes, leopards, predatory and raptors while Anqa doesn't hunt any of them because they are all under Anqa control. However, if Anqa hunts something, Anqa eats it while the rest of the hunt gets eaten by animals under Anqa control. Anqa hunts only elephants, great fishes and tannins.')

=== Identification ===
The Anqa is frequently identified (to the point of becoming synonymous) with the simurgh of Persian mythology along with the Armenian and Byzantine eagles and the Turkic Konrul, also called Semrük, due to the sphere of influence of Islamic art following the fall of the Sasanian Empire. It is also almost always glossed as a phoenix. In Turkish, the other name for the Konrul as well as a phoenix is Zümrüdü Anka "the emerald Anqa". In the Modern Standard Arabic, Anqa is identified as a phoenix or griffin.

== See also ==
- Simurgh
- Phoenix
- Garuda
- Chalkydri, bird hybrid creatures that live near the Sun alongside phoenixes from the Second book of Enoch
- Roc, another enormous legendary bird of Middle Eastern origin popularized in Arab folklore
- Anzû, a massive bird divinity or monster in Mesopotamian religion
- Konrul, also known as Zumrud Anka
- Ziz, a giant griffin-like bird in Jewish mythology

== Bibliography ==
- Wafayat al-aʼyan by Ibn Khallikan biography number 349
- Lisān al-ʿArab by Ibn Manzur part 10 page 276
- The Wonder of Creation by Zakariya al-Qazwini
- Kitab al-'Ayn by Al-Khalil ibn Ahmad al-Farahidi
