= Shahrokh =

Shahrukh, Shahrokh or Shah Rukh (Persian: شاهرخ) is a Persian name meaning "royal face" (shah means "king", while rukh means "face"). It may refer to:

== Historical ==
- Shah Rukh (1377–1447), ruler of the Timurid empire
- Shahrukh Bey (1680–1721), first Khan of Kokand Khanate
- Shahrukh Afshar (1730–1796), Iranian king
- Shahruh Mehmed (died 1510), Dulkadirid prince and statesman
- Shahrukh of Shirvan, Shirvanshah from 1535 to 1538

== Given name ==
- Shahrokh Meskoob (1924–2005), Iranian writer
- Shahrukh Husain (born 1950), Pakistani author
- Shahrokh Bayani (born 1960), Iranian footballer
- Shah Rukh Khan (born 1965), Indian actor, producer, television personality and philanthropist
- Shahrokh Moshkin Ghalam (born 1967), Iranian folkloric dancer and theatre director
- Shahrukh Murtazaev (born 1994), Uzbek producer
- Shahrukh Khan (born 1995), Indian cricketer
- Shahrokh Razmjou, Iranian archaeologist and historian

== Surname ==
- Muhammad Shah Rukh (1926–2015), Pakistani field hockey player and cyclist

== Other ==
- Roc (mythology), in Iranian literature

== See also ==
- Shahrokhi (disambiguation)
- Simurgh, a mythical bird in Iranian mythology
