= Konrul =

Mythologic figure

In Turkic mythology, Konrul, also Kongrul and Konqrul (Azeri: Qonrul, قنرل, Гонрул) is a long-lived bird that is cyclically regenerated or reborn, similar to a phoenix.

== Description ==
Konrul is depicted as a winged creature in the shape of a bird, gigantic enough to carry off an elephant. It appears as a peacock with the head of a dog and the claws of a lion; sometimes however also with a human face. It has an enmity towards snakes and its natural habitat is a place with plenty of water. Its feathers are said to be the color of copper, and though it was originally described as being a dog-bird, later it was shown with either the head of a dog.

=== Toghrul ===
Konrul also has a twin named "Toghrul" (Tu'rul). In one account a hero rescues Konrul's offspring by killing a serpent that was crawling up the tree to feed upon them. As a reward, Konrul gives him three of her feathers which the hero uses to call her for help by burning them. Later, Konrul carries him to a distant land. In another, Konrul carries the hero out of the netherworld.

Turul and Konrul as intimate twins are also known as Buğdayık and Kumayık or Semrük and Kerkes and sometimes Züzülö and Öksökö. They roost in the "Tree of Life", which stands in the middle of the world.

== Identification with other mythical birds ==
Konrul is often identified with the Greek Phoenix or Persian Simurg (in Turkic languages Semrük). It also has many striking similarities with the Indian Garuda.

== Zumrud Anka ==
Anka also spelled Ankha or Angha (Persian: عنقا, from Arabic عنقاء "Anqa, phoenix") and also known as Simurgh, is a benevolent, mythical flying creature and common figure in Middle Eastern cultures. The figure can be found in all periods of Greater Iranian art and literature, and is evident also in the iconography of medieval Armenia, the Byzantine Empire, and other regions that were within the sphere of Persian cultural influence. The mythical bird is also found in the mythology of the Turkic peoples of Central Asia and is called Semrug, Semurg, Samran and Samruk. Simurgh is shortened to "Sīmīr" in the Kurdish language.

Konrul also goes by the name of Zumrud (Persian: زمرد, romanized: zomorrod, zumurrud) meaning "emerald". In Azeri folklore, a hero named Malik Mammad was the son of one of the wealthiest kings of Azerbaijan who owned a large garden. In the center of the garden was a magic apple tree which yielded apples every day. An ugly giant called Div (from Persian دیو dîv "demon, fiend") decides to steal all the apples every night. The king then sends Malik Mammad and his elder brothers to fight the giant whence Malik Mammad saves Zumrud's babies from an Azhdaha (Persian dragon). Zumrud, pleased with Malik Mammad, decides to help him. When Malik Mammad wanted to pass from the "Dark World" into the "Light World", Zumrud asks him to provide "forty half carcasses of meat and forty wineskin filled with water". Zumrud puts the water on its left wing and the meat on the other and Malik Mammad is able to enter the "Light World".

== See also ==
- Phoenix
- Simurg
- Turul
- Oksoko
