= Shahrokhi (surname) =

Shahrokhi (Persian: شاهرخی) is an Iranian surname. Notable people with the name include:

- Mahasti Shahrokhi, Iranian novelist and poet
- Manuchehr Shahrokhi, American professor of global business and finance
- Mehdi Shahrokhi (born 1985), Iranian shot putter
- Mehrab Shahrokhi (1944–1993), Iranian football player
