= Simurgh =

Iranian mythological bird

- Simurgh as the royal emblem of the Sassanian Empire

Creature information
- Grouping: Mythical creature
- Folklore: Persian mythology

Origin
- Country: Ancient Iran

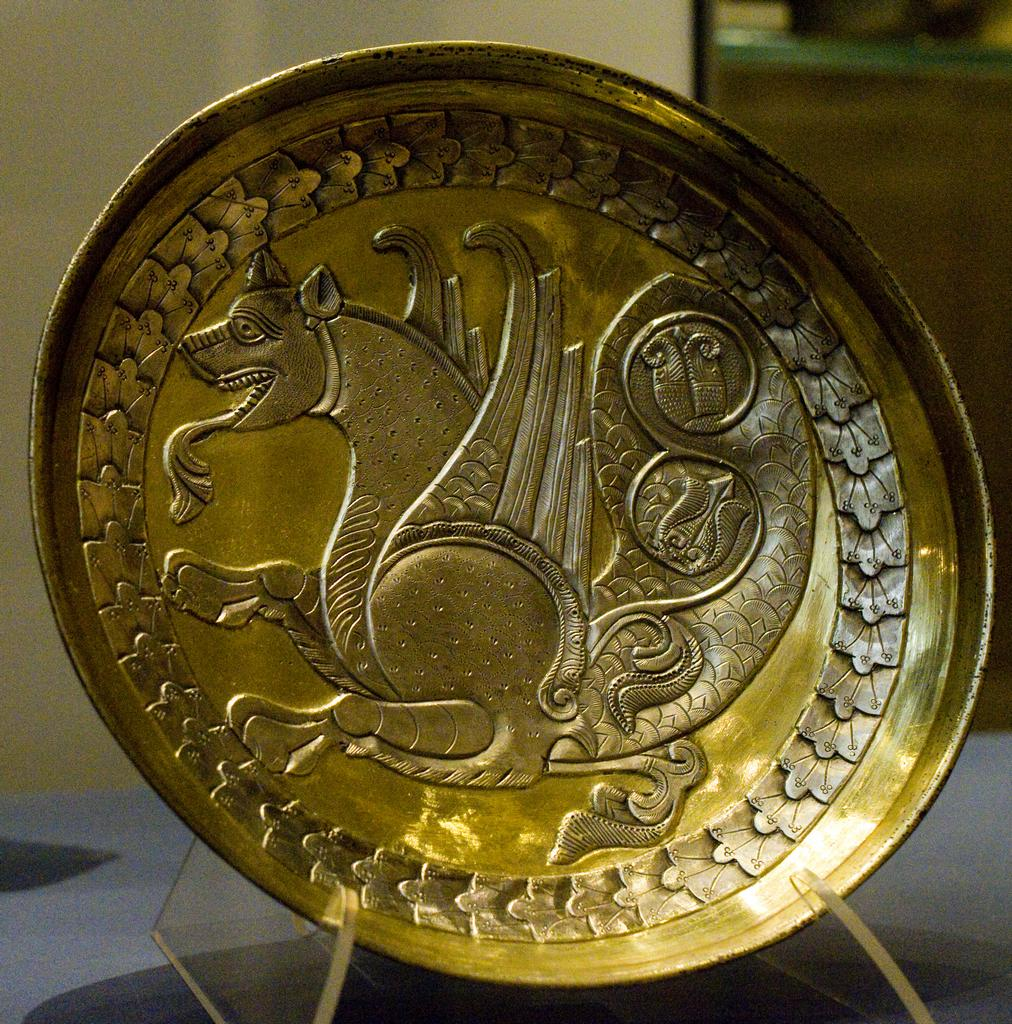
Sassanian silver plate of a simurgh (Sēnmurw), 7th or 8th century CE

The simurgh (/sɪˈmɜːrɡ/; Persian: سیمرغ; also spelled senmurv, simorgh, simorg, simurg, simoorg, simorq or simourv) is a benevolent bird in Iranian mythology and literature. It bears some similarities with mythological birds from different origins, such as the phoenix (Persian: ققنوس quqnūs) and the humā (Persian: هما). The figure can be found in all periods of Iranian art and literature and is also evident in the iconography of Georgia, medieval Armenia, the Eastern Roman Empire, and other regions that were within the realm of Persian cultural influence.

== Etymology ==
The Persian word sīmurğ (سیمرغ) derives from Middle Persian sēnmurw and earlier sēnmuruγ, also attested in Pazend texts as sīna-mrū. The Middle Persian word comes from Avestan mərəγō Saēnō "the bird Saēna", originally a raptor, likely an eagle, falcon, or sparrowhawk, as can be deduced from the etymological cognate Sanskrit śyenaḥ (श्येनः) raptor, eagle and bird of prey, which also appears as a divine figure. Saēna is also a personal name. The word was lent to Armenian as siramarg (սիրամարգ) 'peacock'.

On the other hand, the phrase sī murğ (سی مرغ) means "thirty birds" in Persian; this has been used by Attar of Nishapur in his symbolic story of The Conference of the Birds, the frame story of which employs a play on the name.

== Mythology ==
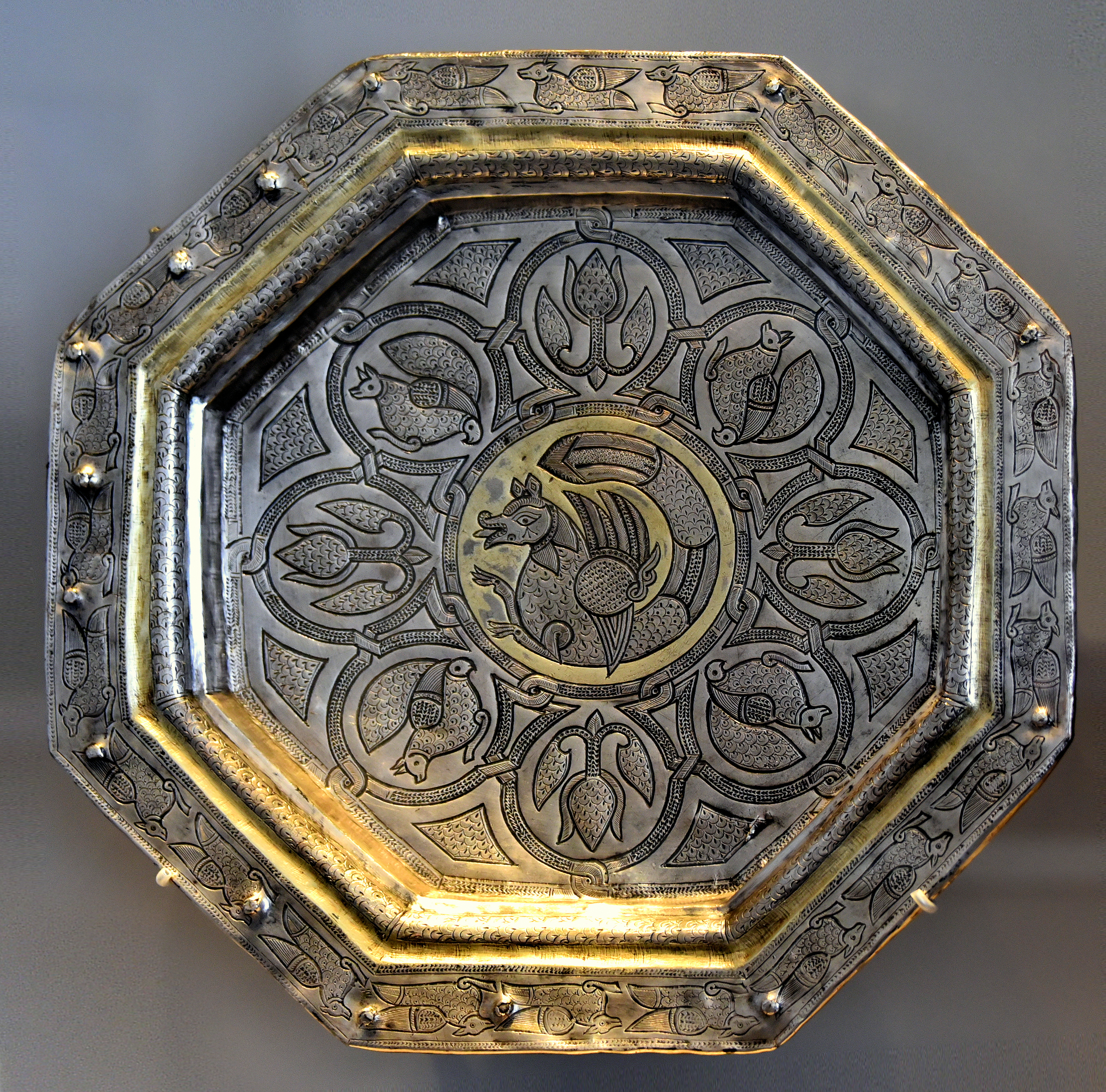
Samanian Simurgh platter" (9th-10th century). Simurgh as a word in Persian is a double entendre (or Īhām), and can be interpreted as 30 birds. This plate depicts that interpretation. Attar of Nishapur also mentions this interpretation in his poetic book of Conference of the Birds

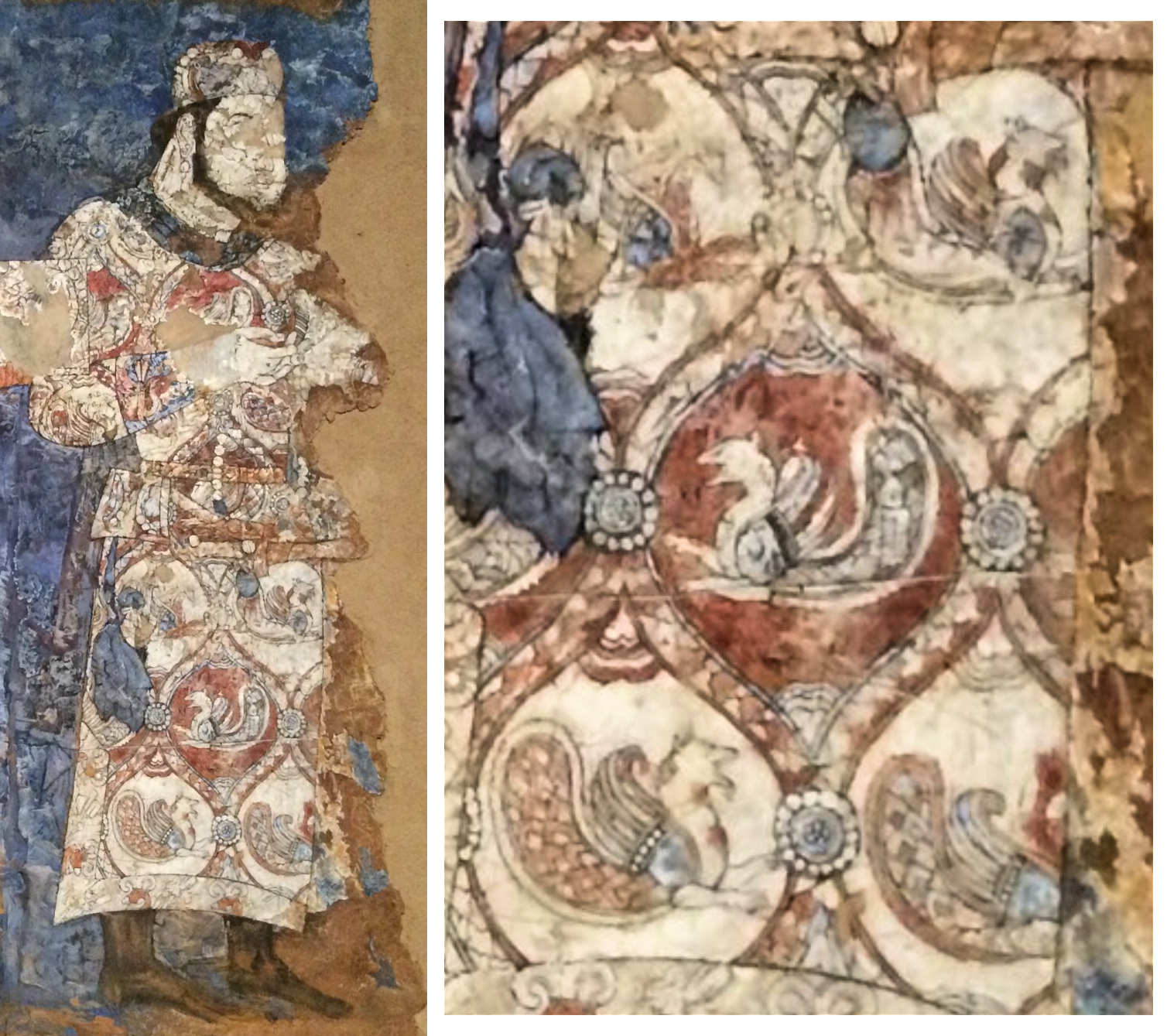
Ambassador with Simurgh design on his dress in the Afrasiab murals, 648–651 CE.

=== Form and function ===
The Simurgh is depicted in Iranian art as a winged creature in the shape of a bird, gigantic enough to carry off an elephant or a whale. It appears as a peacock with the head of a dog and the claws of a lion – sometimes, however, also with a human face. The Simurgh is inherently benevolent. Being part mammal, they suckle their young. The Simurgh has an enmity towards snakes, and its natural habitat is a place with plenty of water. Its feathers are said to be the colour of copper in some versions, and though it was originally described as being a dog-bird, later it was shown with either the head of a man or a dog (Bearded vultures are variably orange or rust of plumage on their head, breast, and leg feathers, but this is thought to be cosmetic. This colouration comes from dust-bathing or rubbing iron-rich mud on its body).

"Si-", the first element in the name, has been connected in folk etymology to Modern Persian si ‘thirty’. Although this prefix is not historically related to the origin of the name simurgh, "thirty" has nonetheless been the basis for legends incorporating that number – for instance, that the simurgh was as large as thirty birds or had thirty colours (siræng). Other suggested etymologies include Pahlavi sin murgh ‘eagle bird’ and Avestan saeno merego ‘eagle’.

Iranian legends consider the bird so old that it had seen the destruction of the world three times over. The simurgh learned so much by living so long that it is thought to possess the knowledge of all the ages. In one legend, the simurgh was said to live 1,700 years before plunging itself into flames (much like the phoenix).

The simurgh was considered to purify the land and waters and hence bestow fertility. The creature represented the union between the Earth and the sky, serving as mediator and messenger between the two. The simurgh roosted in Gaokerena, the Hōm (Avestan: Haoma) Tree of Life, which stands in the middle of the world sea (Vourukasha). The plant is potent medicine and is called all-healing, and the seeds of all plants are deposited on it. When the simurgh took flight, the leaves of the tree of life shook, making all the seeds of every plant fall out. These seeds floated around the world on the winds of Vayu-Vata and the rains of Tishtrya, in cosmology taking root to become every type of plant that ever lived and curing all the illnesses of mankind.

The relationship between the simurgh and Hōm is extremely close. Like the simurgh, Hōm is represented as a bird, a messenger, and the essence of purity that can heal any illness or wound. Hōm – appointed as the first priest – is the essence of divinity, a property it shares with the simurgh. The Hōm is in addition the vehicle of farr(ah) (MPers: khwarrah, Avestan xᵛarənah, kavaēm kharēno) ‘divine glory; fortune’. Farrah in turn represents the divine mandate that was the foundation of a king's authority.

It appears as a bird resting on the head or shoulder of would-be kings and clerics, indicating Ormuzd's acceptance of that individual as his divine representative on Earth. For the commoner, Bahrām wraps fortune/glory "around the house of the worshipper, for wealth in cattle, like the great bird Saena, and as the watery clouds cover the great mountains" (Yasht 14.41, cf. the rains of Tishtrya above). Like the simurgh, farrah is also associated with the waters of Vourukasha (Yasht 19.51, 56–57). In Yašt 12.17 Simorgh's (Saēna's) tree stands in the middle of the sea Vourukaša, it has good and potent medicine and is called all-healing, and the seeds of all plants are deposited on it.

The Simugh is comparable to the Griffin, often viewed by historians and scholars as the Western Iranic version of this creature, whereas the Griffin is the Eastern Iranic version, as it originated in Scythia. The Simugh, in a similar parallel, represents power and protection in Iranian folkloric symbolism and myth.

The Sasanians heavily used the Simurgh, both as their tribal emblem, but also in their art and propaganda.

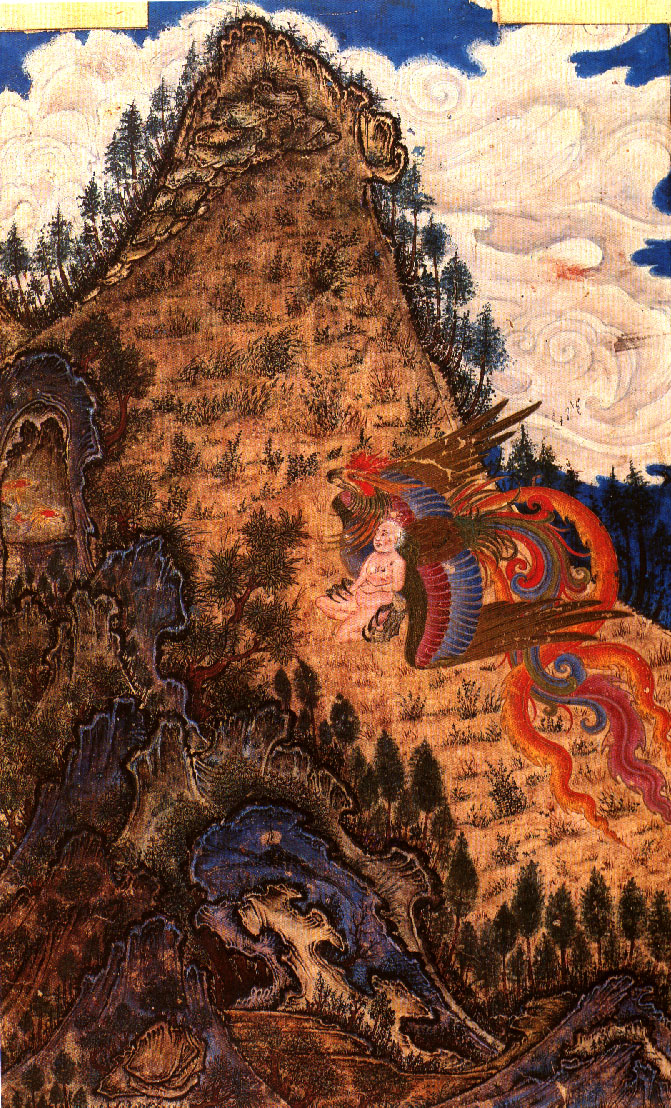
Zal and the Simurgh on the Mount Qaf

=== In the Shahnameh ===
The simurgh made its most famous appearance in Ferdowsi's epic Shahnameh (Book of Kings), where its involvement with Prince Zal is described. According to the Shahnameh, Zal, the son of Saam, was born albino. When Saam saw his albino son, he assumed that the child was the spawn of devils, and abandoned the infant on the mountain Alborz.

The child's cries were heard by the tender-hearted simurgh, who lived atop this peak, and she retrieved the child and raised him as her own. Zal was taught much wisdom from the loving simurgh, who has all knowledge, but the time came when he grew into a man and yearned to rejoin the world of men. Though the simurgh was terribly saddened, she gave him three golden feathers which he was to burn if he ever needed her assistance.

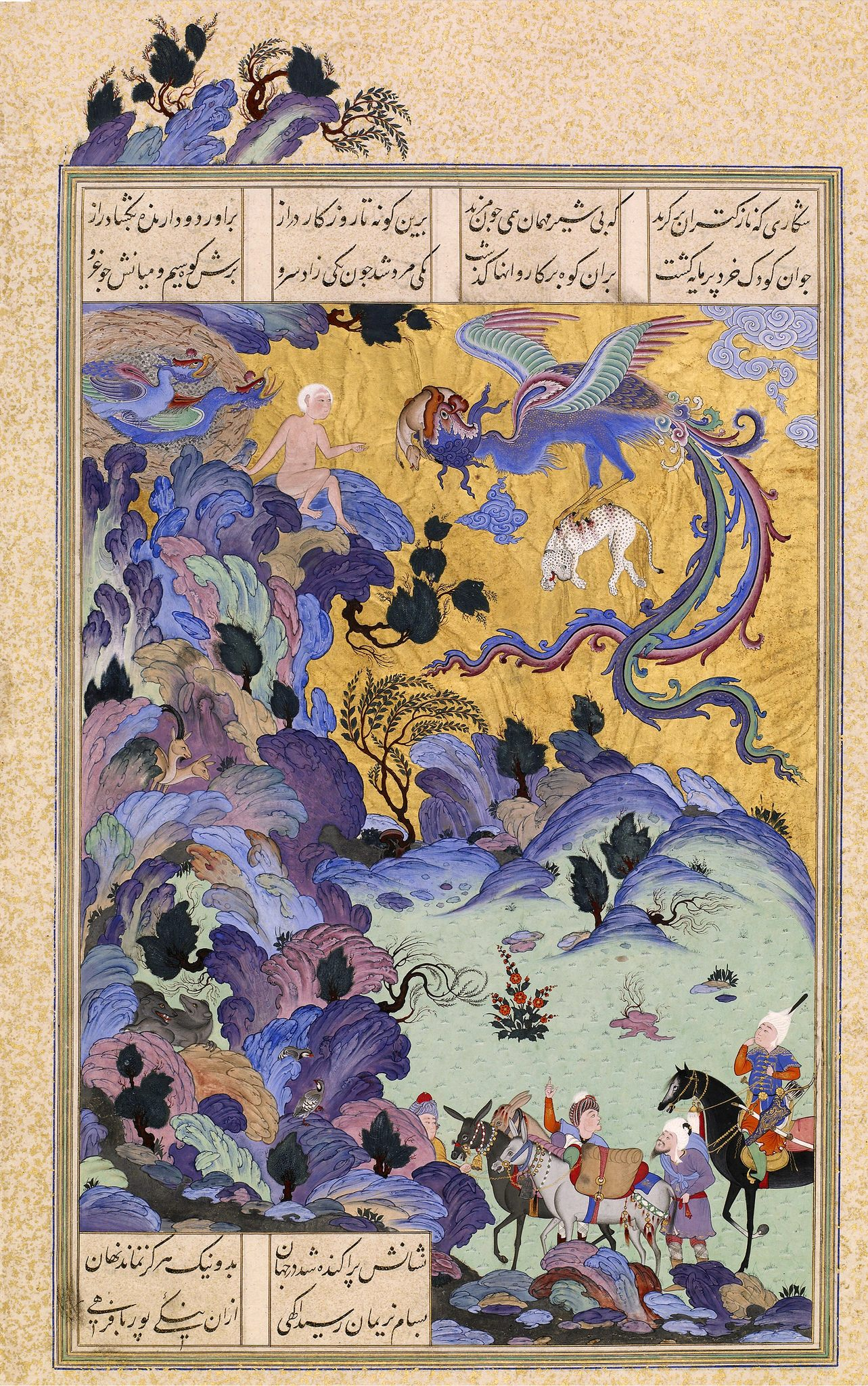
Simurgh returning to nest to Zal and its chicks. —"Zal is Sighted by a Caravan" (Tahmasp Shahnamah, fol. 62v), Sackler Gallery LTS1995.2.46

Upon returning to his kingdom, Zal fell in love and married the beautiful Rudaba. When it came time for their son to be born, the labor was prolonged and terrible; Zal was certain that his wife would die in labour. Rudaba was near death when Zal decided to summon the simurgh. The simurgh appeared and instructed him upon how to perform a cesarean section thus saving Rudaba and the child, who became one of the greatest Persian heroes, Rostam.

Simurgh also shows up in the story of the Seven Trials of Esfandiyar in the latter's 5th labor. After killing the wicked enchantress, Esfandiyar fights a simurgh, and despite the simurgh's many powers, Esfandiyar strikes it in the neck, decapitating it. The simurgh's offspring then rise to fight Esfandiyar, but they, too, are slain.

Simurgh is also very much involved in Rostam's storyline. Rostam's father Zāl who was raised by the legendary bird Simurgh (apparently there were two different Simurghs in Shahnameh, one which is slain in 7 labours of Esfandiyār and the other one which raised Zāl and lived in mountains of Iran) summons Simurgh by burning a feather given to him from Simurgh herself to ask help for curing his son. Simurgh benevolently cures both Rostam and his horse Rakhsh who was also wounded by Esfandiyār's arrows. Rostam then learns from the Simurgh that the only weapon that can affect Esfandiyār is a special double-headed arrow, made from the branch of a tamarisk tree near the Persian Gulf which must be shot through his eyes. According to scholar Hamid Mahamedi, the Simorgh makes a prophetic declaration to Rostam:

The Simorgh, on advising Rostam not to seek to kill Esfandiyār, warns him thus: "Fortune will sacrifice any man who spills the blood of the hero Esfandiyār; as long as life shall last in that man he will find no deliverance from torment nor will his prosperity endure." In the Davāni story, the Simorgh tells Rostam that he will live for another five hundred years, but if he kills Esfandiyār, he will outlive Esfandiyār by only one year.

Simurgh also warns Rostam about the fate that awaits the killer of Esfandiyār and asks Rostam to consider surrendering to the Prince, and since he is a divine prince there would be no shame in surrendering to him. But Rostam refuses to accept either the shame of surrendering or being chained by anyone. Upon making this decision, Simurgh carries Rostam to the tamarisk tree, where he fashions the double head arrow with a feather of Simurgh and a twig of the tamarisk tree. When the battle resumes the next morning, Esfandiyār is blinded by a shot through the eye.

Before dying, Esfandiyār tells Rostam to take his son Bahman under his wing and not to blame himself: it was the false promise of his father and the Arrow of Simurgh that killed him. Esfandiyār tells Rostam that Goshtasp should be guilty as the real murderer. After his death, Esfandiyār is put into a box and was sent to Goshtasp.

=== In Persian Sufi poetry ===
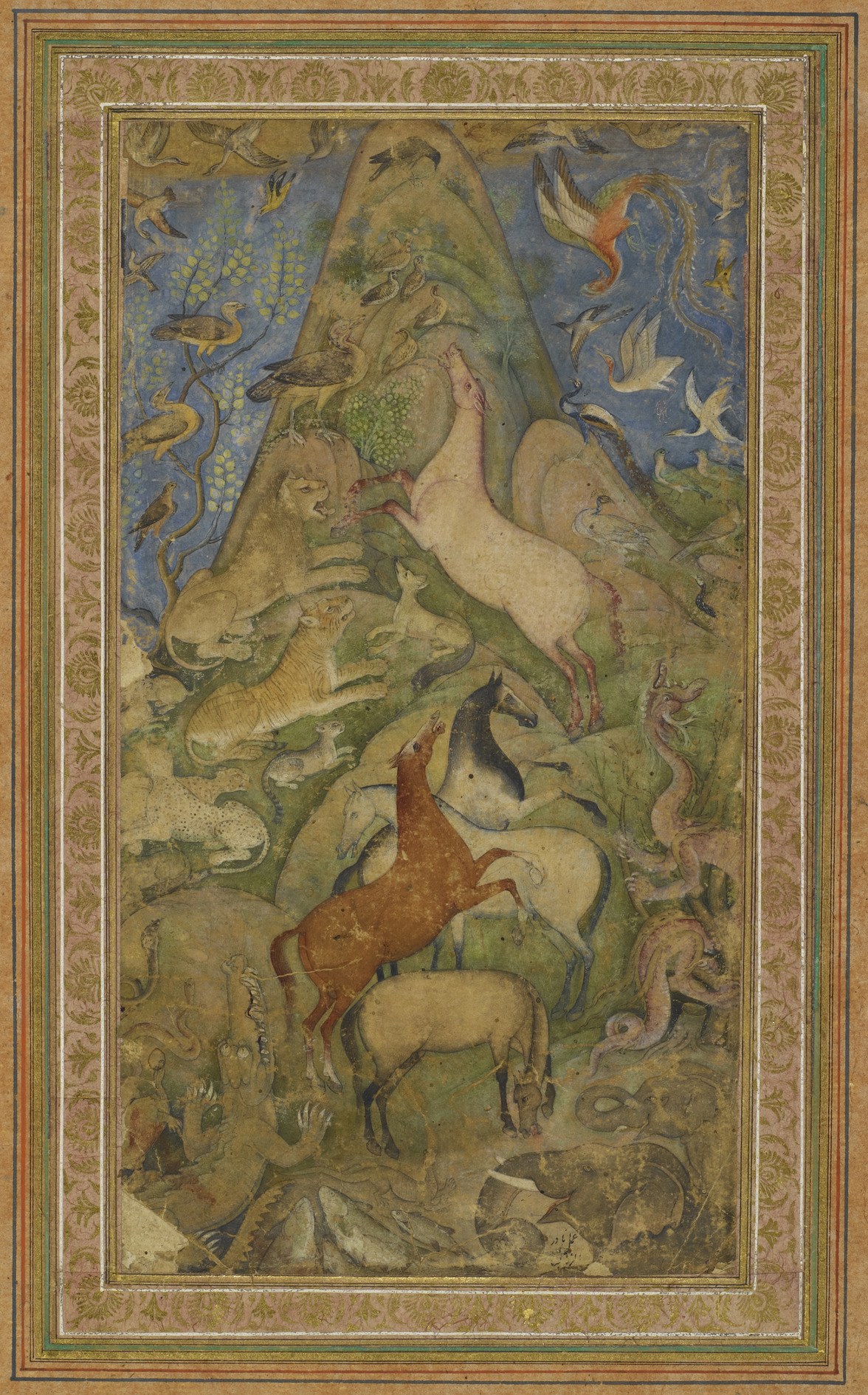
Simurgh from the works of Attar of Nishapur

In classical and modern Persian literature the simorḡ is frequently mentioned, particularly as a metaphor for God in Sufi mysticism. In the 12th century Conference of the Birds, Iranian Sufi poet Farid ud-Din Attar wrote of a band of pilgrim birds in search of the simurgh. In the poem, the birds of the world gather to decide who is to be their king, as they have none. The hoopoe, the wisest of them all, suggests that they should find the legendary simorgh, a mythical Persian bird roughly equivalent to the western phoenix. The hoopoe leads the birds, each of whom represent a human fault which prevents man from attaining enlightenment. When the group of thirty birds finally reach the dwelling place of the simorgh, all they find is a lake in which they see their own reflection. This scene employs a pun on the Persian expression for "thirty birds" (si morgh).

The phrase also appears three times in Rumi's Masnavi, e.g. in Book VI, Story IX: "The nest of the sī murğ is beyond Mount Qaf" (as translated by E.H. Whinfield).

Through heavy Persian influence, the simurgh was introduced to the Arabic-speaking world, where the concept was conflated with other Arabic mythical birds such as the ghoghnus, a bird having some mythical relation with the date palm, and further developed as the rukh (the origin of the English word "roc"). Representations of simurgh were adopted in early Umayyad art and coinage.

=== In Kurdish folklore ===
Simurgh is shortened to "sīmir" in the Kurdish language. The scholar C. V. Trever quotes two Kurdish folktales about the bird. These versions go back to the common stock of Iranian simorḡ stories. In one of the folk tales, a hero rescues the simurgh's offspring by killing a snake that was crawling up the tree to feed upon them. As a reward, the simurgh gives him three of her feathers which the hero can use to call for her help by burning them. Later, the hero uses the feathers, and the simurgh carries him to a distant land. In the other tale, the simurgh carries the hero out of the netherworld; here the simurgh feeds its young with its teats, a trait which agrees with the description of the simurgh in the Middle Persian book titled Zadspram. In another tale, simurgh feeds the hero on the journey while the hero feeds simurgh with pieces of sheep's fat.

== In popular culture ==
- Ambrose Bierce's The Devil's Dictionary (1906) characterizes the Simurgh as "omnipotent on condition that it do nothing" and likens it to the role of the rabble in a republic.
- The title of Salman Rushdie's first novel, Grimus (1975), is an anagram of Simurg.
- Simurgh is the name of a proxy tool introduced in 2009 that helps residents of Iran avoid government censorship of websites.
- The Crystal Simorgh is an award given by Fajr International Film Festival.
- The Simorgh is one of the creatures encountered by the protagonists in the 2006 movie Azur & Asmar: The Princes' Quest.
- The Simurgh is the name of one of the Endbringers in the 2011 Worm web serial.
- In the Yu-Gi-Oh card game, Simorgh is the boss monster of its own archetype.
- A Simurgh card from a fictional collectible card game serves as a major plot device in the sci-fi novel Entanglement, by Gibson Monk.
- A simurgh appeared in chapter 49 of the manga Delicious in Dungeon as Laios contemplates various bird-like monsters. It is shown large enough to hold an elephant in its talons.
- The Simurgh is featured in Prince of Persia: The Lost Crown, a 2024 video game in which it indirectly grants the player character various time-manipulation powers used to progress in the game. It also serves as a plot device, as the antagonist of the game seeks to master its power.
- In her poem "Garden Simurgh", Kathleen Raine describes how 'I hung out nuts for the blue-tits but the sparrows came, / All thirty of them / With a flurry of wings, / One mind in thirty vociferous selves...' eventually concluding that no 'wonder-bird' should be deemed 'more miraculous' than these 'two-a-farthing sparrows / Each feather bearing the carelessly-worn signature / Of the universe'.
- The Simurgh is referenced in both Zeyn Joukhadar’s novels, The Map of Salt and Stars and The Thirty Names of Night. In the latter novel, an ornithologist names a (fictional) species of ibis Geronticus simurghus, after the mythical Simurgh.

== Gallery ==
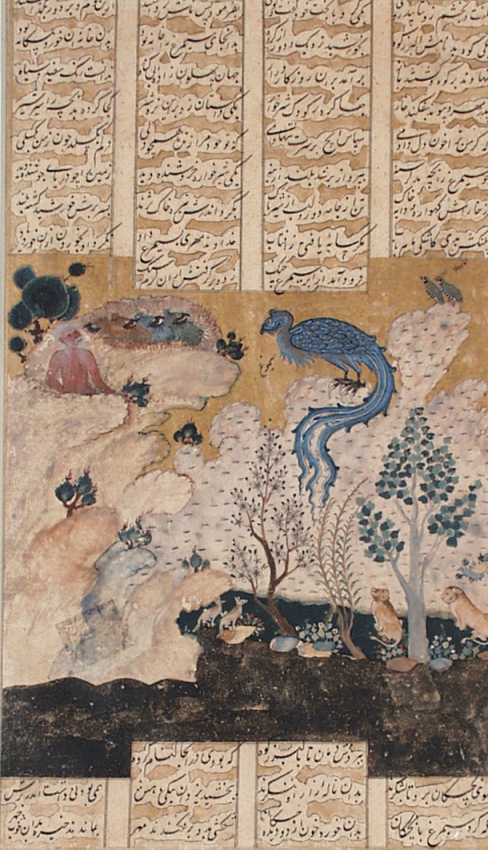
Simurgh at its nest

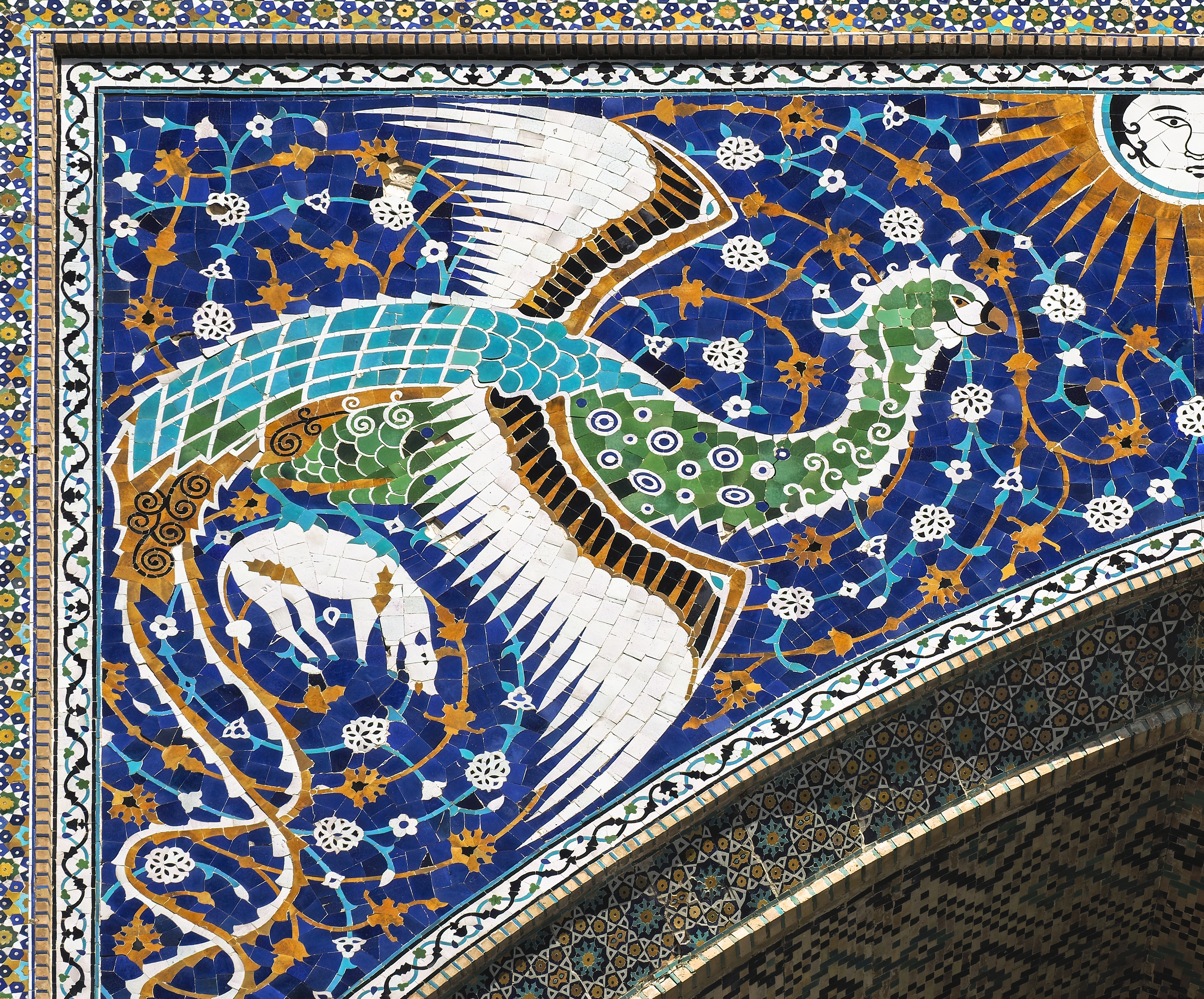
Decoration outside of Nadir Divan-Beghi madrasah, Bukhara

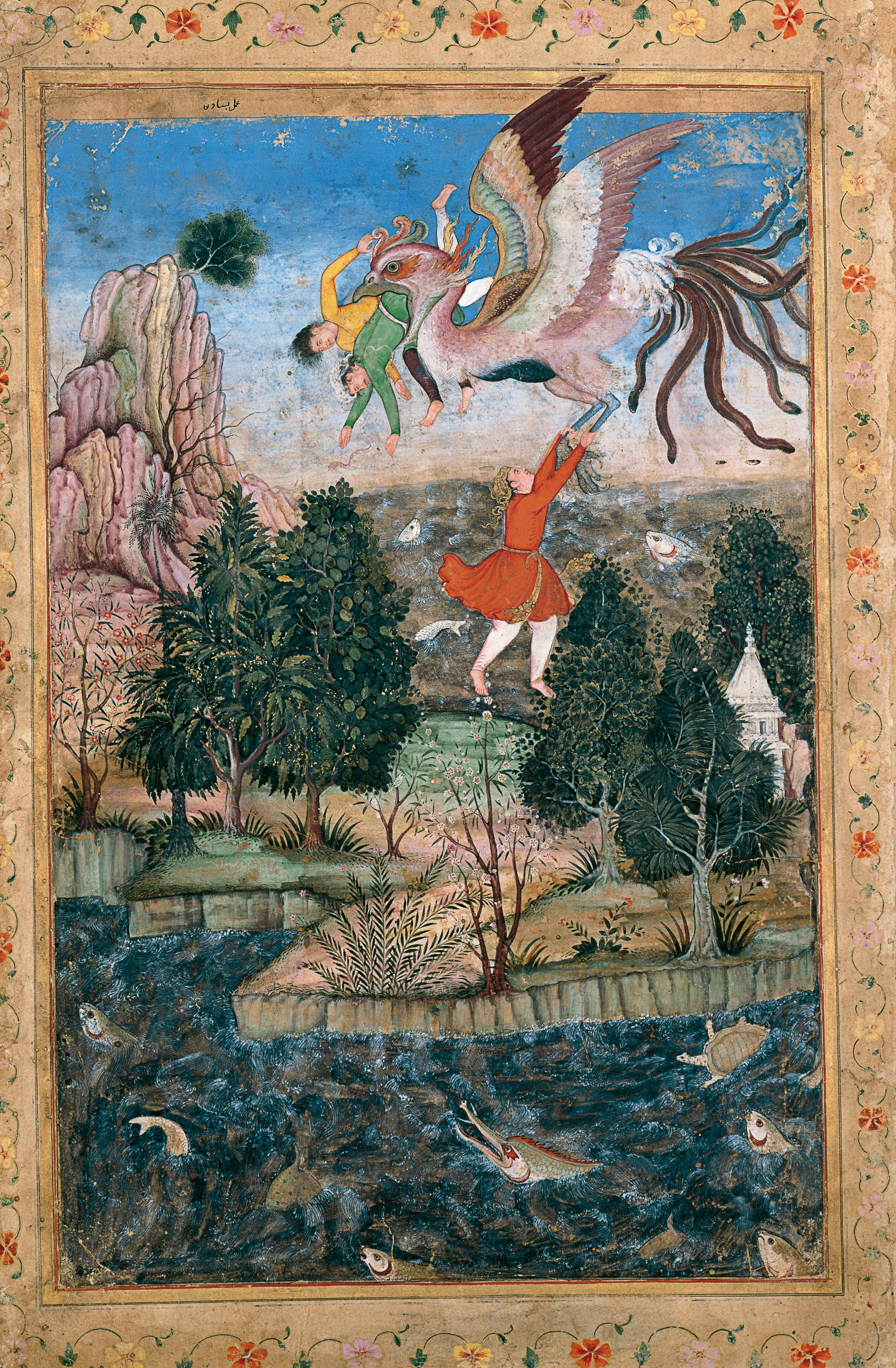
Painting of the Simurgh made in the Mughal Empire

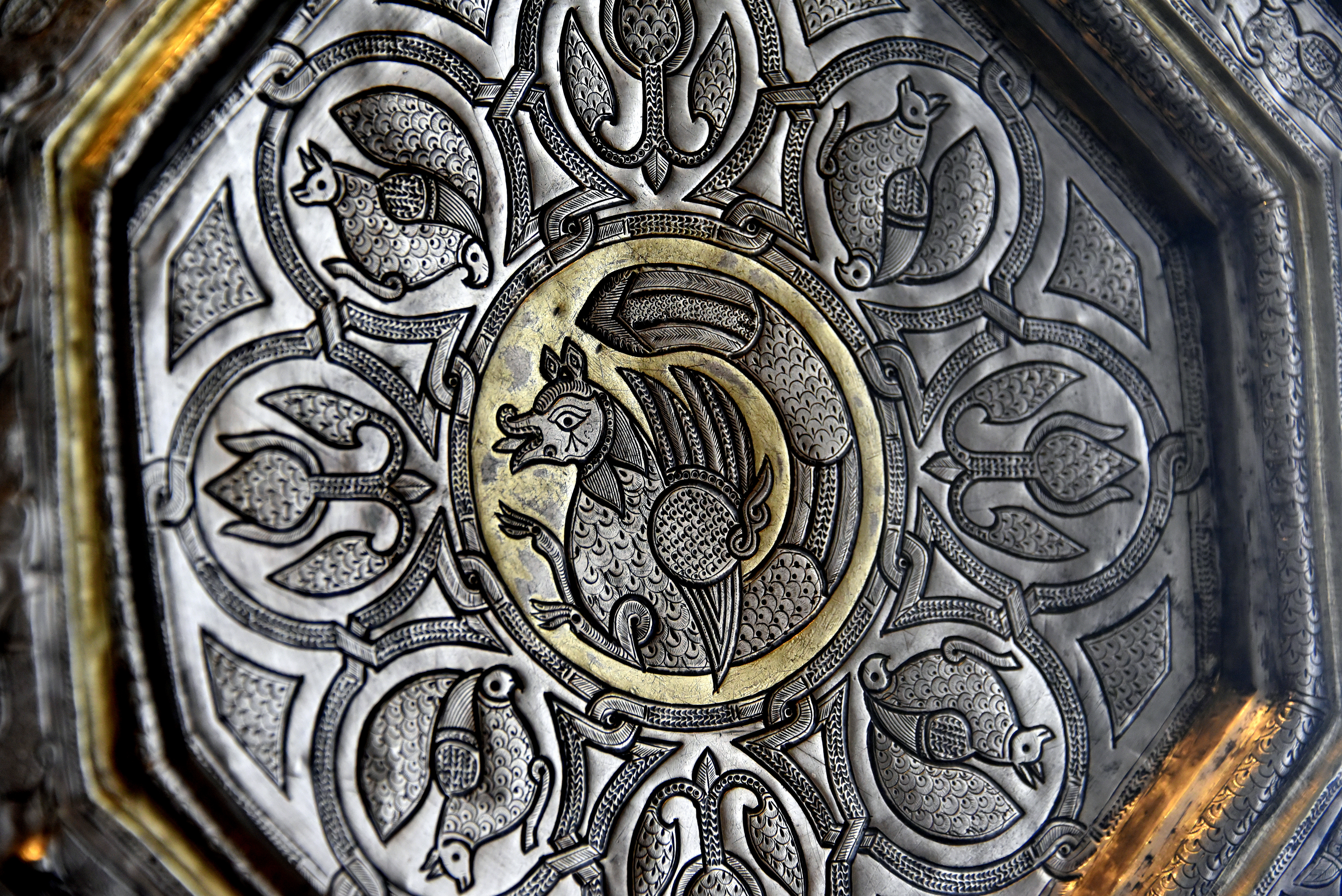
Simurgh platter. From Iran. Samanid dynasty, 9th–10th century CE. Museum für Islamische Kunst, Berlin

== See also ==
- Anqa, Arabian mythological bird identified with the Simurgh
- Anzû (older reading: Zû), Mesopotamian monster
- Chamrosh, Persian mythological bird
- Chimera, Greek mythological hybrid monster
- Fenghuang, mythological bird of East Asia
- Garuda, Indian mythological bird
- Griffin or griffon, Greek lion-bird hybrid
- Huma bird, Iranian mythical bird
- Hybrid creatures in mythology
- Konrul, Turkish mythological hybrid bird
- Lamassu, Assyrian deity, bull/lion-eagle-human hybrid
- Luan, Chinese mythological bird related to the phoenix, whose name is often translated as "simurgh"
- Nue, Japanese legendary creature
- Oksoko, Slavic mythological double-headed eagle
- Pamola, A Legendary bird-spirit in Abenaki Mythology
- Pegasus, winged stallion in Greek mythology
- Pixiu or Pi Yao, Chinese mythical creature
- Roc, Arab and Persian legendary bird, the opposite of Anqa
- Shahbaz (bird), Persian mythological bird
- Simargl, a related being in Slavic mythology
- Sphinx, Greek mythical creature with lion's body and human head
- Turul, Turkic and Hungarian mythological bird of prey and a national symbol of Hungarians
- Ziz, giant griffin-like bird in Jewish mythology
- Zhar Ptica, bird in Russian mythology parallel to the Phoenix
