= Macedonian literature =

Macedonian literature (Macedonian: македонска книжевност) begins with the Ohrid Literary School in the First Bulgarian Empire (nowadays North Macedonia) in 886. These first written works in the dialects of the Old Church Slavonic were religious. The school was established by St. Clement of Ohrid. The Macedonian recension at that time was part of the Old Church Slavonic and it did not represent one regional dialect but a generalized form of early Eastern South Slavic. The standardization of Macedonian in the 20th century provided good ground for further development of the modern Macedonian literature and this period is the richest one in the history of the literature itself.

== History ==
Macedonian was not officially recognized until the establishment of Macedonia as a constituent republic of communist Yugoslavia in 1945. Krste Petkov Misirkov in his Za Makedonckite raboti (1903; On the Macedonian Matters) and in the literary periodical Vardar (established 1905) helped to create the foundations of Macedonian language and literature. These efforts were continued after World War I by Kosta Racin, who wrote mainly poetry in Macedonian and propagated its use through the literary journals of the 1930s. Racin's poems in Beli mugri (1939; White Dawns), which include many elements of oral folk poetry, were prohibited by the government of pre-World War II Yugoslavia. Some writers, such as Kole Nedelkovski, worked and published abroad because of political pressure. In addition in the year 1925 the Greek government issued a schoolbook called the Abecedar in the Lerin dialect in order to educate the Slavic speakers of Greek Macedonia.

== Periods ==
The Macedonian Academy of Sciences and Arts divides Macedonian literature into three large periods, which are subdivided into additional ones. The periods of the Macedonian literature are:

- Old Macedonian literature – 9th to 18th centuries
  - From the introduction of Christianity until the Turkish invasions – 9th to 14th centuries
  - From the Turkish invasions until the beginning of the 18th century
- New Macedonian literature – 1802 to 1944
  - period of national awakening
  - revolutionary period
  - inter-war literary period
- Modern Macedonian literature – 1944 – today

== Modern literature ==
After World War II, under the new Yugoslav SR Macedonia, Blaze Koneski and others were charged with the task of standardizing Macedonian as the official literary language. With this new freedom to write and publish in its own language, SR Macedonia produced many literary figures in the postwar period. The Association of Writers of Macedonia, the country's largest and oldest association of writers, was established on 13.02.1947. Poetry was represented in the work of Aco Šopov, Slavko Janevski, Blaze Koneski, and Gane Todorovski. Janevski was also a distinguished prose writer and the author of the first Macedonian novel, Selo zad sedumte jaseni (1952; “The Village Beyond the Seven Ash Trees”). His most ambitious work was a cycle of eight novels that deals with Macedonian history and includes Tvrdoglavi (1965; “The Stubborn Ones”), a novel articulating the Macedonian people's myths and legends of remembering and interpreting their history. Prewar playwrights, such as Vasil Iljoski, continued to write, and the theatre was invigorated by new dramatists, such as Kole Cašule, Tome Arsovski, and Goran Stefanovski. Cašule also wrote several novels. A main theme of his work is the defeat of idealists and idealism. His play Crnila (1960; “Black Things”) deals with the early 20th-century murder of an IMRO leader by other Organization's activists and with the characters of both executioners and victim.

Among the best-known novelists and writers of prose were Stale Popov (Krpen zivot (1953; “Darned life”)), Gjorgji Abadžiev (Pustina (1961; “Desert”)) and Zivko Cingo, whose collections of stories Paskvelija (1962) and Nova Paskvelija (1965; “New Paskvelija”) are about an imaginary land where clashes and interactions between old traditions and revolutionary consciousness are enacted. His novel Golemata voda (1971; “The Great Water”), set in an orphanage, shows the grandness and sadness of childhood. Other notable writers include Petre M. Andreevski (Pirej (1980; “Pirej”)), Vlada Uroševic (Sonuvacot i prazninata (1979; “The Dreamer and the Emptiness”)), Jovan Pavlovski (Sok od prostata (1991; “Prostate Gland Juice”)), Venko Andonovski (Papokot na svetot (2000; “Navel of the World”)), Aleksandar Prokopiev (Covekot so cetiri casovnici (2003; “The Man With Four Watches”)), and some of the leading playwrights were Jordan Plevnes (Mazedonische zustände (1979; “Mazedonische zustände”)), Sashko Nasev (Chija si (1991; “Who do you Belong to”)), and Dejan Dukovski (Bure barut (1996; “The powder keg”)).

The diversity of themes and narrative styles among 21st-century writers has grown even more, and the list includes writers born in the period 1970s–1990s. Some of the most distinguished in this generation are: Goce Smilevski (Sestrata na Sigmund Frojd (2007; “Freud's Sister”)), Lidija Dimkovska (Rezerven zivot (2012; “A Spare Life”)), Slavcho Koviloski (Sinot na kralot (2011; “The Son of the King”)), Nikola Madzirov (Ostatoci od nekoe drugo vreme (2007; “Remnants of Another Age”)), Stefan Markovski (Anatomija na bumbarot (2020; “The Bumblebee Anatomy”)), Rumena Bužarovska (Mojot maz (2014; “My Husband”)), Petar Andonovski (Teloto vo koe mora da se zivee (2015; “The Body One Must Live In”)), Nenad Joldeski (Sekoj so svoeto ezero (2012; “Each with Their Own Lake”)), and others. The association of the country's writers became a member of the European Writers' Council on 04.06.2023, with Stefan Markovski giving the acceptance interview.

== Notable works ==
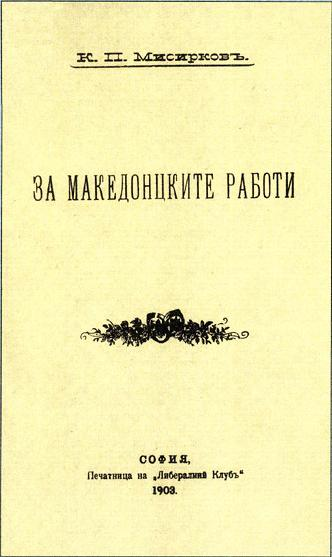
Za Makedonckite raboti (1903)

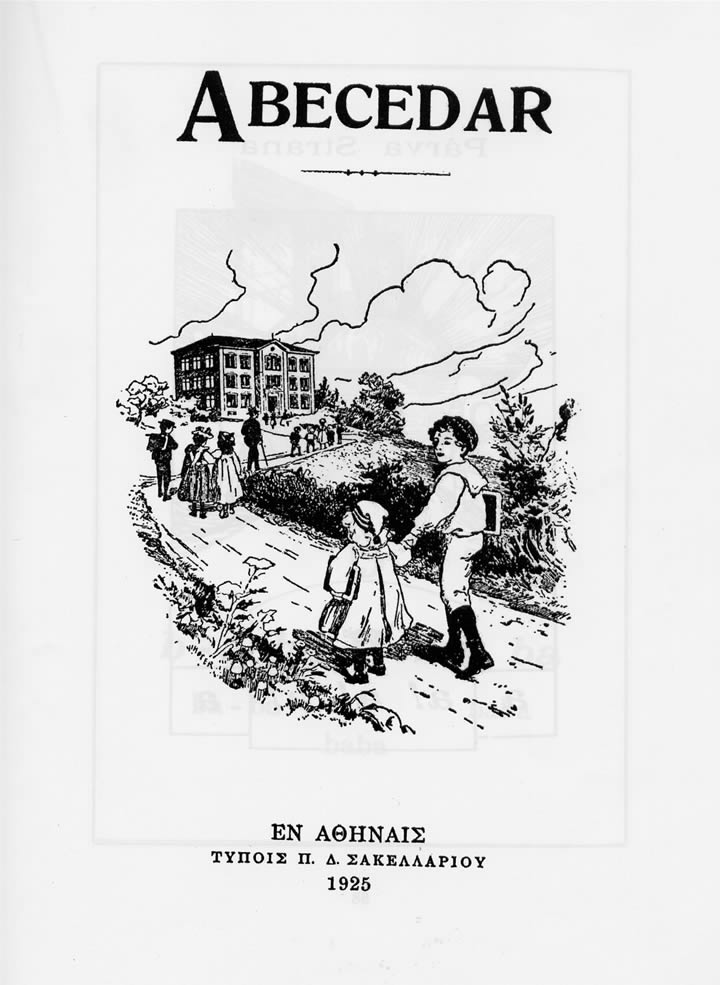
The Abecedar (1925)

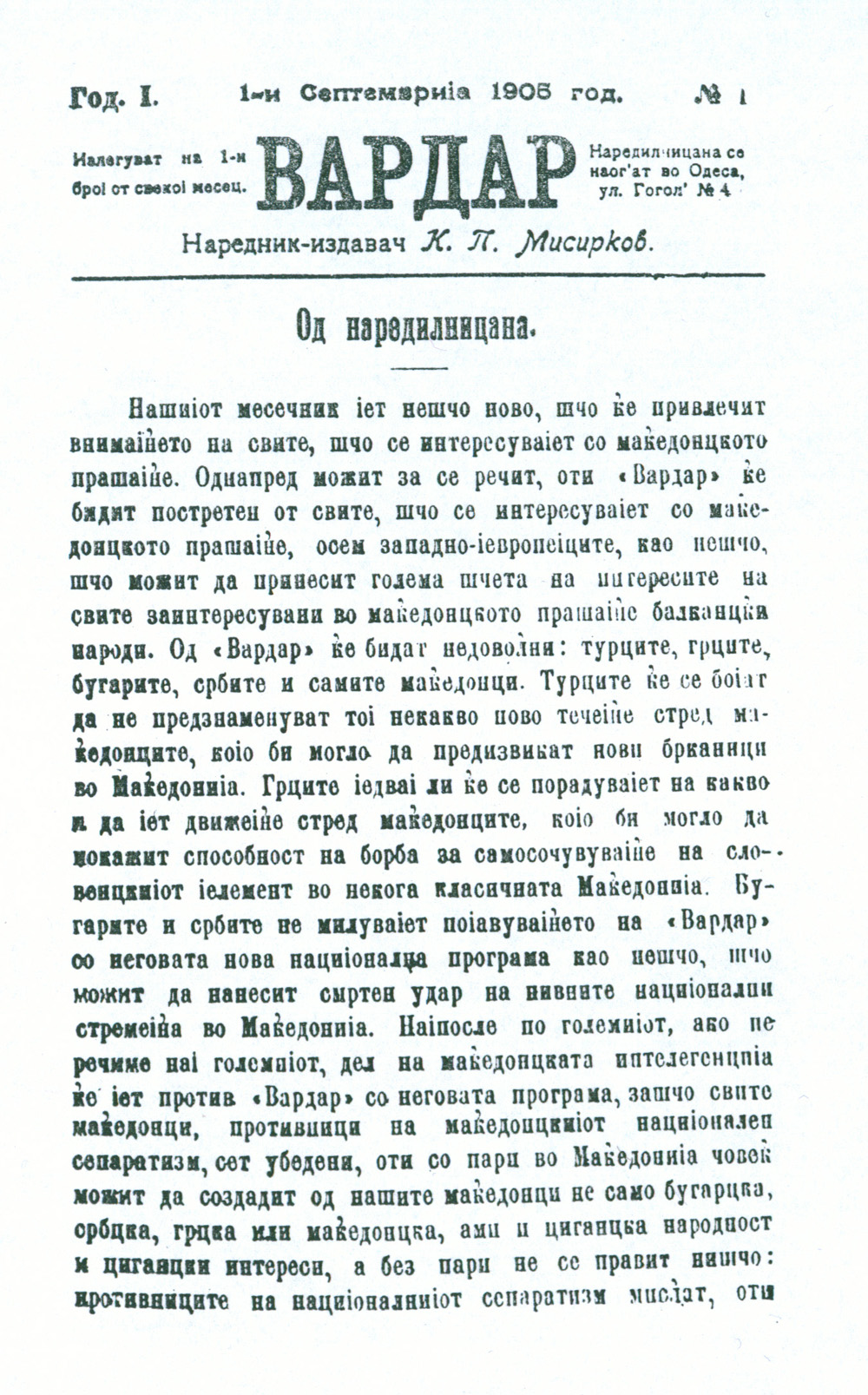
Vardar Magazine (1905)

A Dictionary of Three languages (1875)

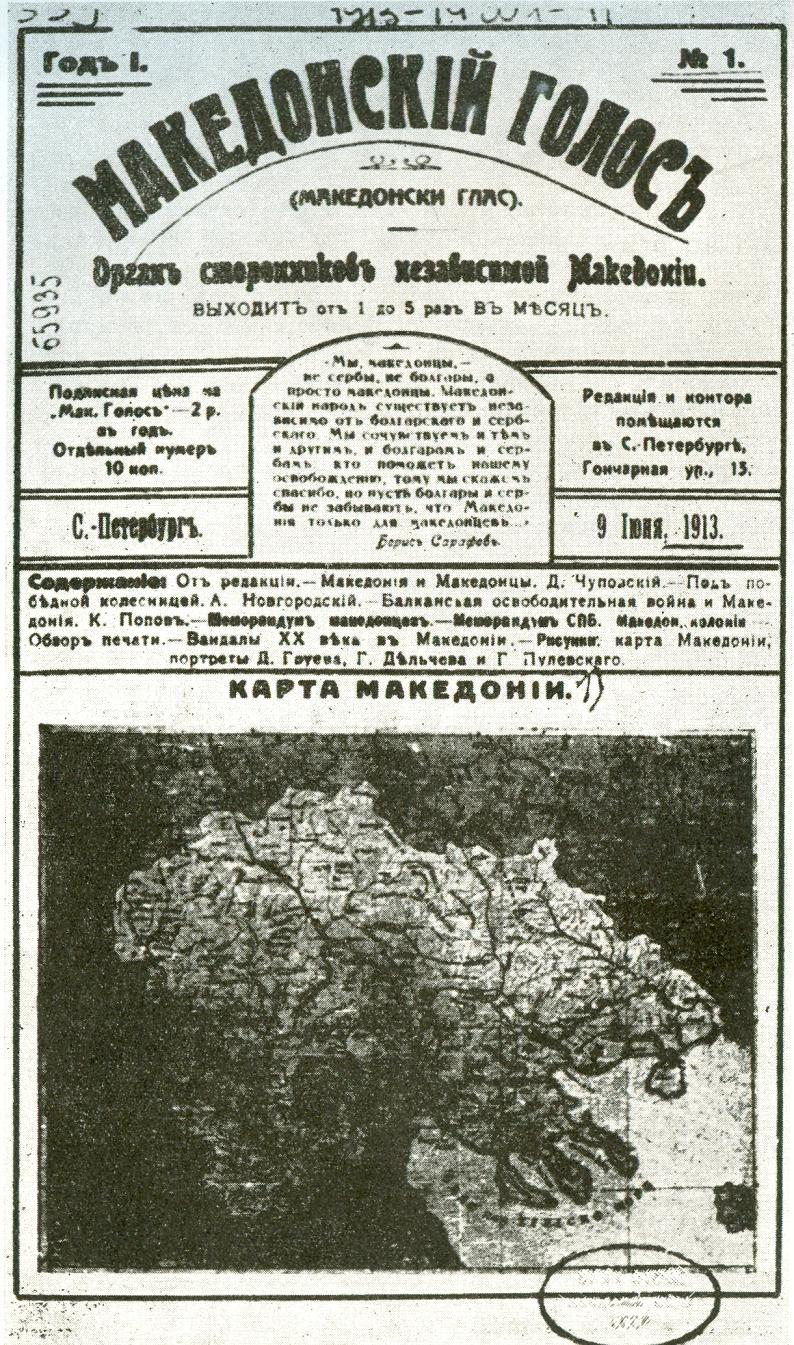
Makedonski Golos (1913)

== See also ==
- Macedonian language
- History of the Macedonian language
- List of Macedonian writers
