= Sovremenost =

First Macedonian literary magazine

Sovremenost is the oldest Macedonian magazine for literature, culture and art. It was created in 1951 as a direct successor of the first Macedonian magazine for art, science and social issues Nov Den. The first issue of the first magazine for art, science and social issues, the monthly magazine Nov Den was published in October 1945. The new publication embraced principles of artistic pluralism, diversity and inclusivity with explicit rejection of imposition of stylistic uniformity.

The editors of Nov Den were: Dimitar Mitrev, Vlado Maleski, Blaže Koneski, Slavko Janevski and Kole Čašule. The magazine for literature, culture and art Sovremenost was created by the editors of Nov Den and is the direct successor of this magazine. The first editor of the publication in period between 1951 and 1953 was Vlado Maleski followed by Dimitar Mitrev from 1954 till 1969.

Sovremenost exerted a great influence in the promotion and affirmation of Macedonian literature both in the country and abroad. A large number of Macedonian authors debuted on the pages of the magazine, who later became bearers of Macedonian prose, poetry and drama (e.g. Stale Popov with the short stories "Mice Kasapče" and "Petre Andov"), but also authors by whom the magazine was recognized (for example, Aco Šopov, Dimitar Mitrev, Blaže Koneski, and others). The publication covered other artistic fields publishing contributions on music, theatre, visual art as well as significant number of translations of important works from other Yugoslav languages.

== Editors and editorial policy ==
The chief editors of Sovremenost were the writers and publicists:

- 1951 – Kiro Hadji Vasilev
- 1951–1952 – Vlado Maleski
- 1952–53 – Slavko Janevski, Dimitar Mitrev and Aco Šopov
- 1954–1957 – Dimitar Mitrev
- 1958 – Alexandar Ezhov
- 1958–1968 – Dimitar Mitrev
- 1969–1982 – Georgi Stalev Popovski
- 1983–2002 – Aleksandar Alexiev
- 2003–2012 – Vasil Tocinovski
- 2013–2017 – Slavčo Koviloski
- 2018 – Stefan Markovski

Macedonian writers and actors were part of the editorial teams of Sovremenost: Kole Čašule, Vasil Iljoski, Gogo Ivanovski, Gane Todorovski, Cvetko Martinovski, Taško Georgievski, Meto Jovanovski, Jovan Boškovski, Miodrag Drugovac, Tome Momirovski, Risto Avramovski, Duško Nanevski, Georgi Stardelov, Simon Drakul, Petar Širilov, Blagoja Anastasovski, Tome Sazdov, Metodi Manev, and others.
