= Hubert-Burda-Preis für junge Lyrik =

Hubert-Burda-Preis für junge Lyrik was a literary prize of Germany from 1999 to 2010, named after Hubert Burda.

== Laureates ==
- 1999 Zoran Bognar, Maja Vidmar and Uroš Zupan
- 2000 Olga Martynova, Lewan Beridse and Natalia Belchenko
- 2001 Krzysztof Koehler, Mariusz Grzebalski, Marzanna Kielar and Jakub Ekier
- 2002 Petr Borkovec and Mirela Ivanova
- 2003 Constantin Virgil Bănescu, Kateřina Rudčenková and István Vörös
- 2004 Lubina Hajduk-Veljkovićowa, Maja Haderlap and Leo Tuor
- 2005 Julia Fiedorczuk, Ana Ristović and Igor Bulatovsky
- 2006 Serhiy Zhadan and Maria Stepanova
- 2007 Nikola Madzirov, Halyna Petrosanyak and Eugeniusz Tkaczyszyn-Dycki
- 2008 Valzhyna Mort, Delimir Rešicki and Tadeusz Dąbrowski
- 2009 Lidija Dimkovska, Iulian Tănase and Ostap Slyvynsky
- 2010 Lucija Stupica
