= Arsovski =

Arsovski is a surname. Notable people with the surname include:

- Tome Arsovski (1928–2007), Macedonian dramatist
- Bodan Arsovski (born 1956), Macedonian bassist
