= List of people from Resen Municipality =

Below is a list of notable people born in Resen Municipality in North Macedonia:

- Lambe Alabakoski, singer
- Meto Jovanovski, writer
- Trayko Kitanchev, revolutionary
- Andrey Lyapchev, former Bulgarian Prime Minister
- George Nanchoff, football striker
- Louis Nanchoff, football striker
- Ahmed Niyazi Bey, member of the Young Turks
- Simeon Radev, diplomat and writer, author of Builders of Modern Bulgaria
- Hristo Tatarchev, leader of the revolutionary movement in Macedonia and Eastern Thrace
- Lui Temelkovski, former Liberal Party of Canada Member of Parliament for the Ontario riding of Oak Ridges—Markham
