= UKCG =

UKCG can stand for:]

- UK Contractors Group, a trade association
- the Association of Writers of Montenegro: in Serbian: Udruženje književnika Crne Gore

== See also ==
- UCKG
- UKGC
