= House of Milan Piroćanac =

Coordinates: 44.8177°N 20.4622°E

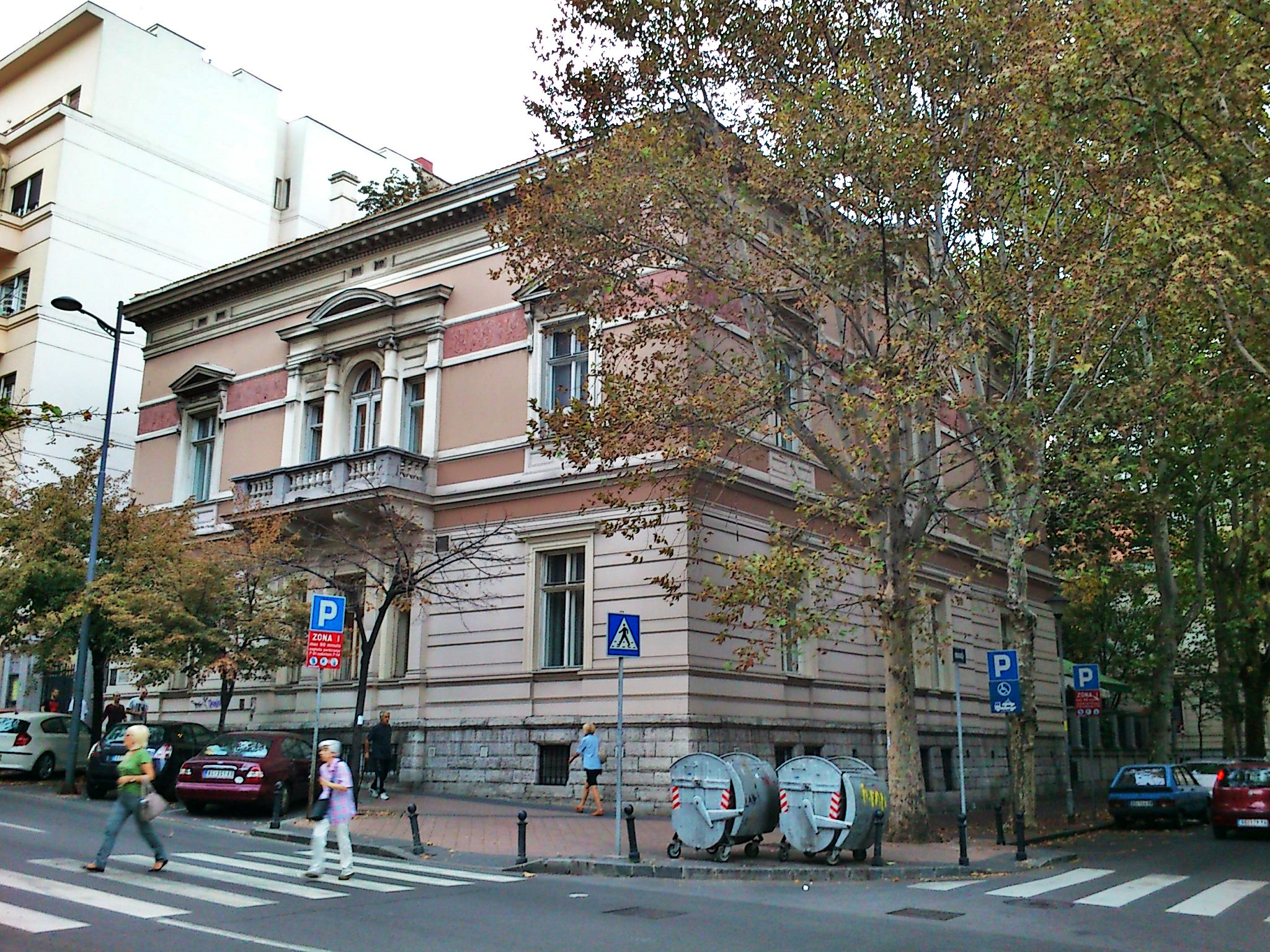
- House of Milan Piroćanac

General information
- Type: Cultural monument
- Location: Stari Grad, Belgrade, Serbia
- Completed: 1884

House of Milan Piroćanac is located in Belgrade, Serbia, at the corner of Francuska and Simina streets, and it has the status of a cultural monument.

== Architecture ==
The house was built around 1884 for Milan Piroćanac, presumably by architect Јоvan Ilkić, as a typical example of the representative urban architecture of the time. For the building of his house, Piroćanac spent the money he got by selling the property for 4,000 ducats, as he told his friend Milan Milićević, and in addition, he borrowed 75,000 francs from Lender Bank.

Representative effect of the house project in accordance with then prevailing academicism with neo-Renaissance elements in the façade, conceived as a free-standing villa, is achieved through the symmetrical composition of the base and rich decorative exterior. In 1934, was carried out by adding the mansard. The special value of the facade which is plastered was achieved by the decorative frieze set over a wide area between the windows on the first floor, developed in graphite which was destroyed during repair.

The overall impression of the grandeur of the interior is complemented by the gypsum plastics of the ceiling and walls, wrought iron balustrades and furniture parts of high levels of craftsmanship. In the house, a significant part of the political and social life of Belgrade and Serbia in the late 19th century took place. The building was then used for diplomatic missions, but since World War II, it is the seat of the Association of Writers of Serbia.

The following people lived in the house:

- From 1884 to 1901. Piroćanac family
- From 1901 to 1914 the Turkish Embassy was located in the house
- From 1919 to 1934 the American Embassy
- From 1934 to 1940 Auto Club of the Kingdom of Yugoslavia
- Association of Writers of Serbia, Association of Writers of Yugoslavia, "Literary Gazette", "Contemporary", Association of Translators and Writers’ Club.

== Gallery ==
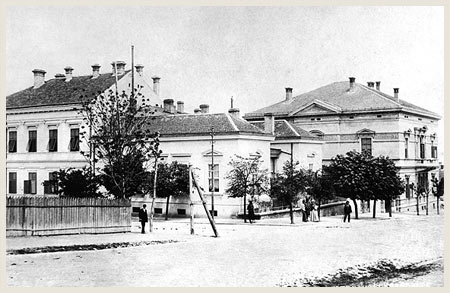

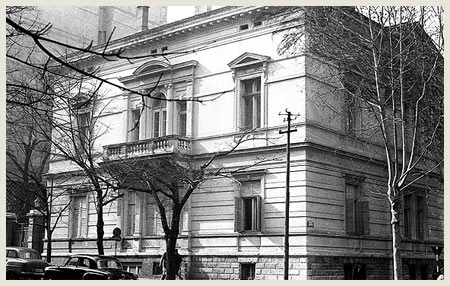

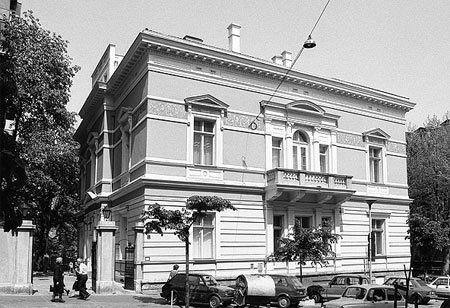

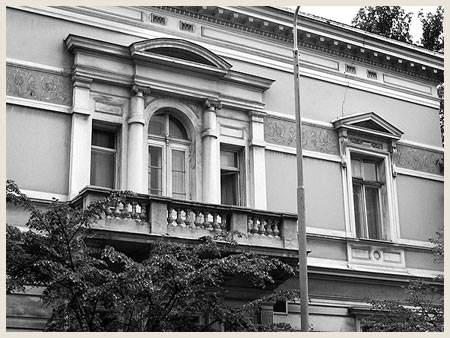

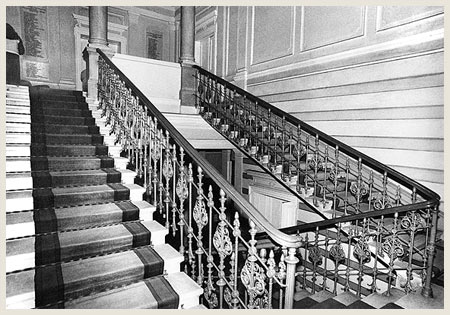

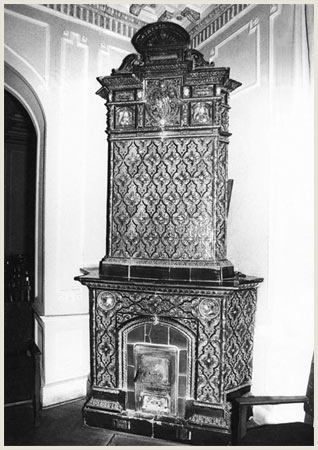

== See also ==
- Dorćol
