= Vasil Iljoski =

Macedonian writer (1902–1995)

- Васил Иљоски
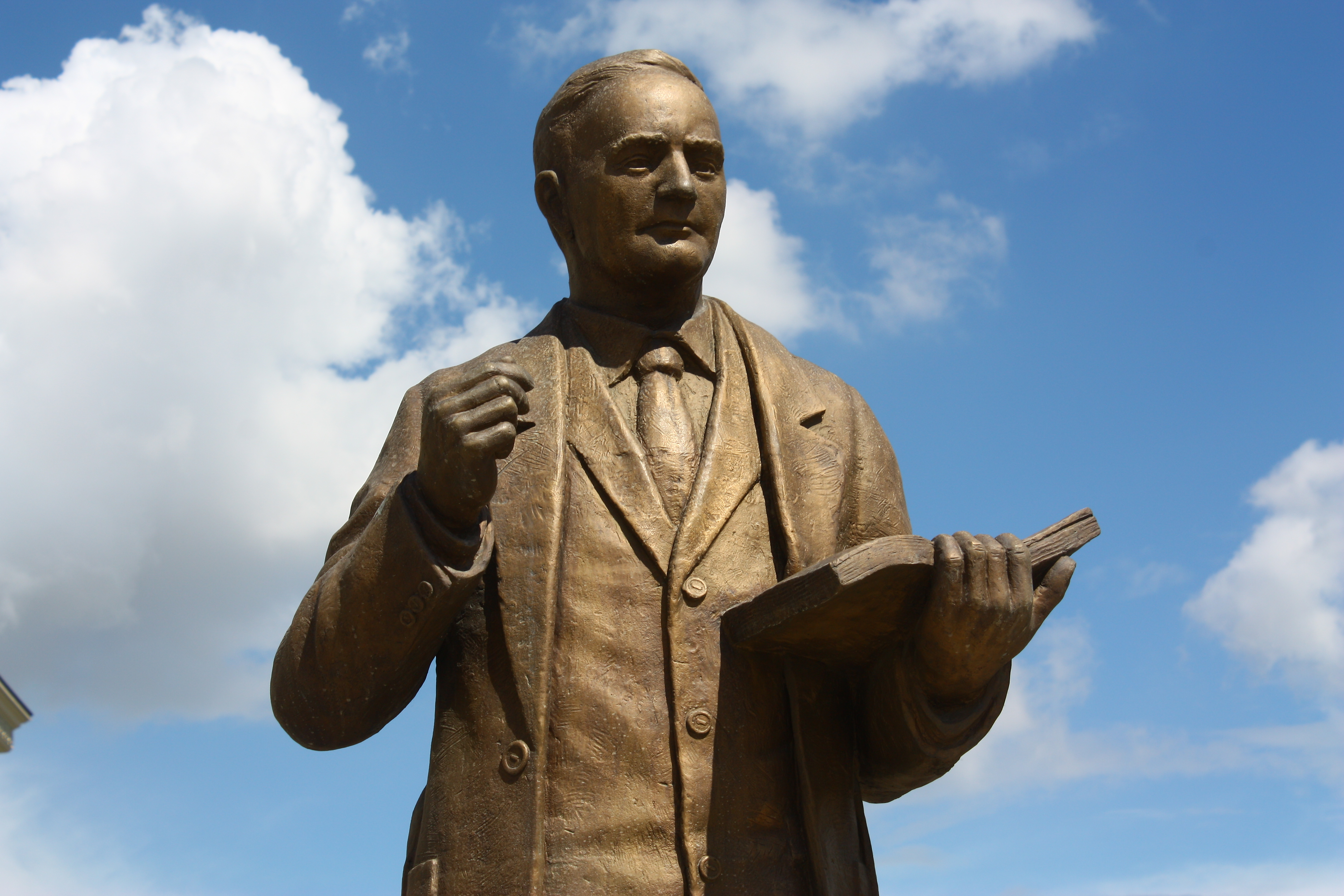
- Statue of Vasil Iljoski on the Bridge of Arts
- Born: Vasil Iljoski; December 20, 1902; Kruševo, Manastir Vilayet, Ottoman Empire (today Republic of North Macedonia)
- Died: November 1, 1995 (aged 92); Skopje, Republic of Macedonia
- Occupations: writer, professor
- Writing career
- Language: Macedonian
- Genre: drama
- Notable works: "Begalka" and "Čorbadži Teodos"

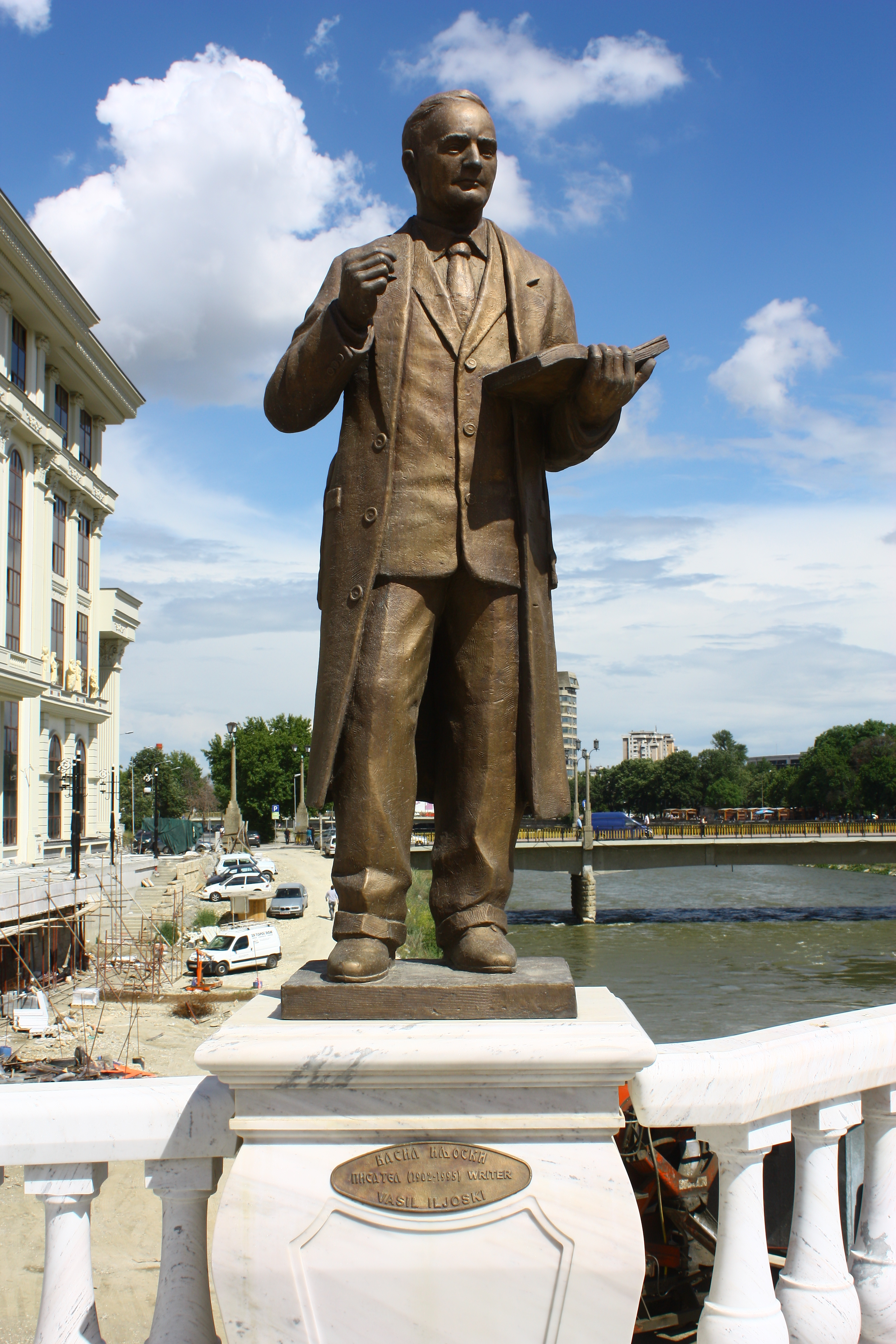
Vasil Iljoski on the Bridge of Arts(1)

Vasil Iljoski (Macedonian: Васил Иљоски; December 20, 1902 – November 1, 1995) was a Macedonian writer, dramatist, professor and an important figure in Macedonian literature, especially in Macedonian drama between the two World Wars.

== Biography ==
Vasil Iljoski was born in Kruševo in 1902. He finished his elementary education in the town of Kumanovo, where he moved in his early childhood. During that period, he helped his father in their family business, but he did not accept it as his future profession. Iljoski finished secondary school in Kumanovo and enrolled at the Faculty of Philosophy in Skopje. At the beginning of his career, he worked as a teacher in the City Gymnasium in Kumanovo. His play Begalka, or known as Lenče Kumanovče, performed in 1928 in the Skopje theater was staged in the Kumanovo dialect, which belongs to the Torlakian dialects. This play was soon banned, because of the then Yugoslav policy of Serbianization and its author was transferred from the local school. Other significant plays written by Iljoski are: Učenička avantura (Student's Adventure, 1939), Čest (Honor), Kuzman Kapidan (1954), Mladi Sinovi (Young Sons) and others. With the end of WWII and the foundation of the Socialist Republic of Macedonia, the Yugoslav authorities recognized a distinct Macedonian language in which standardization he participated. Vasil Iljoski is one of the founders of the Association of the Writers of Macedonia and member at the Macedonian Academy of Sciences and Arts since 1967. He was also part of the editorial team of the literary magazine "Sovremenost". He finished his working career as a regular professor at the Pedagogical Faculty in Skopje.

== Works ==
Vasil Iljoski is the author of many dramas, comedies and essays. Among them are:

- "Begalka" - "Бегалка", published in 1926 also known as "Lenče Kumanovče"
- "Čorbadži Teodos" - "Чорбаџи Теодос", published in 1937
- "Student's adventure", "Ученичка авантура", published in 1939.
- "Office for unemployed", "Биро за безработни"
- "Write, Panče" - "Пиши, Панче", published in 1947.
- "Two against one" - "Два спрема еден", published in 1952.
- "Honor" - "Чест" published in 1953
- "Kuzman Kapidan" - "Кузман Капидан", published in 1954.
- "Father and Son" - "Син и татко", published in 1955.
- "Bloody Stone" - "Окрвавен камен", published in 1968.
- "Wedding" - "Свадба", published in 1976.
- "Death for life" - "Смрт за живот", published in 1988.
- "Young Sons" - "Млади синови"
