= Meto Jovanovski =

Meto Jovanovski may refer to:

- Meto Jovanovski (actor) (1946–2023), Macedonian actor
- Meto Jovanovski (writer) (1928–2016), Macedonian writer
