= Association of Writers of Montenegro =

The Association of Writers of Montenegro (UKCG) (Serbian: Удружење књижевника Црне Горе, Udruženje književnika Crne Gore) is Montenegro's official writing association, and was established on 8 July 1956. Notable past presidents include the first president, Čedo Vuković, and Sreten Asanović. The association awards The Makarije's Letter life achievement award, UKCG Award, and the Award for Book of the Year.

== History ==
The Association of Writers of Montenegro is Montenegro's official writing association. The association was established on 8 July 1956. The association's first president was Čedo Vuković. Before the establishment of the association, there was a Montenegrin section within the Yugoslav Writer's Union. The current president is Novica Đurić, who was elected in 2015, and who took over the function of Ilija Lakušić. The two Vice Presidents are Milica Bakrač and Veselin Rakčević, while the Secretary-appointed is Aleksandar Ćuković. Sreten Asanović was president from 1973 to 1976.

== Mission ==
The UKCG states its main goals as community-building within the Montenegrin writer's community, protecting the professional interests of its members, to improve relationships between writers, publishers and the general public, and to assist members and their families who are in poverty.

== Awards ==
The association awards several awards, including the Makarije's Letter life achievement award, the Marko Miljanov international literary award, the UKCG Award, and the Award for Book of the Year. In 2010 the lifetime achievement award was presented to Metropolitan Amfilohiju. The Marko Miljanov award was presented to Vidak M. Maslovarić and Miroje Vuković in 2023.

== See also ==
- Association of Writers of Yugoslavia
