= Lidija Dimkovska =

Macedonian poet, novelist and translator

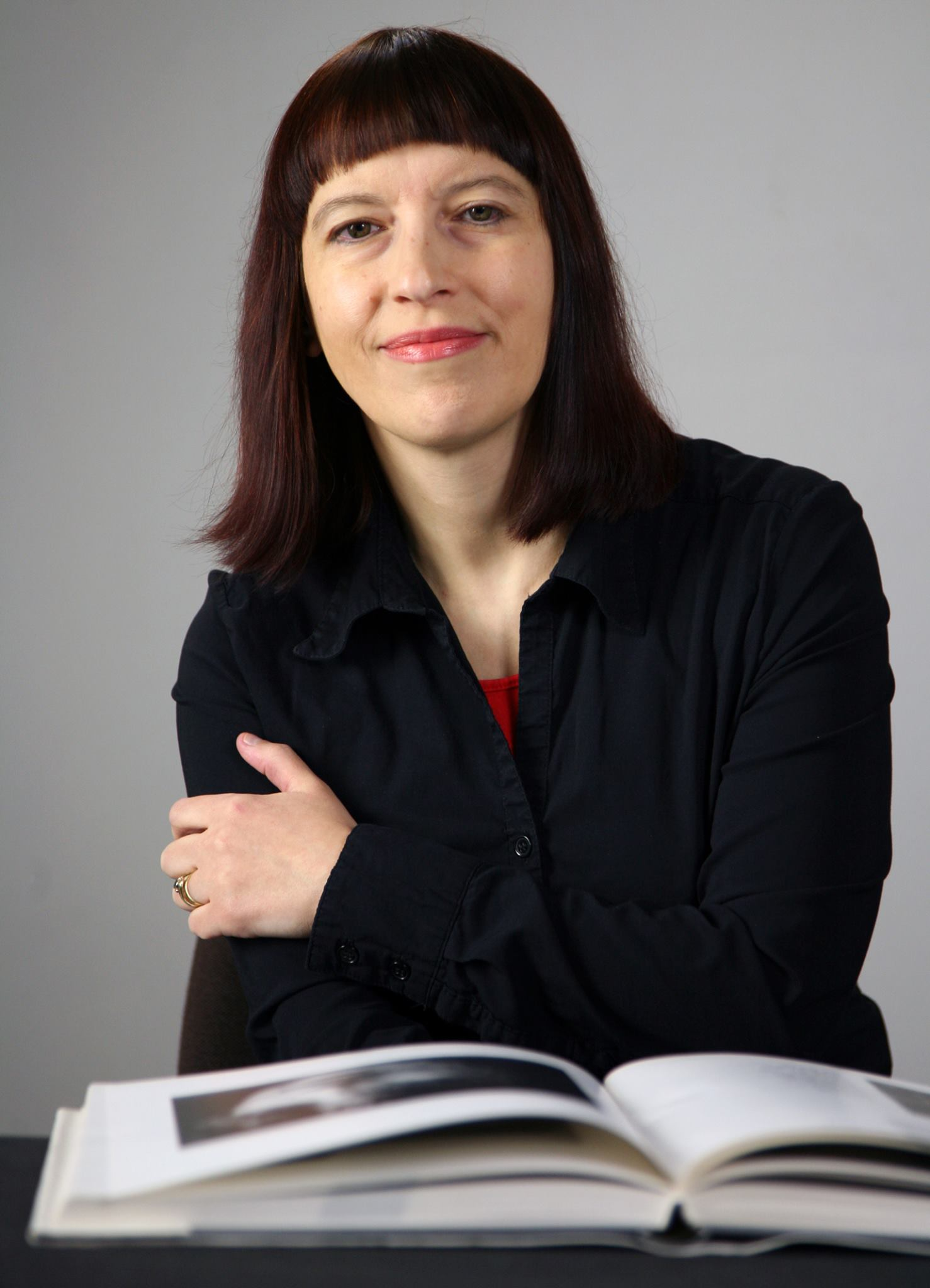
Portrait of Lidija Dimkovska

Lidija Dimkovska (Macedonian: Лидија Димковска), born 1971, is a Macedonian poet, novelist and translator. She was born in Skopje and studied comparative literature at the University of Skopje. She proceeded to obtain a PhD in Romanian literature at the University of Bucharest. She has taught Macedonian language and literature at the University of Bucharest and world literature at the University of Nova Gorica in Slovenia.

Dimkovska was also an editor at Blesok, the online Macedonian literary journal. She now lives in Ljubljana, working as a freelance writer and translator of Romanian and Slovenian literature. She has dual Macedonian/Slovenian citizenship.

== Work ==
In her native Macedonian language Lidija Dimkovska has published seven books of poetry, three novels, one American diary, and one collection of short stories. She has edited an anthology of young Macedonian poetry, an anthology of contemporary Slovenian poetry in Macedonian, and two anthologies of contemporary minority and migrant writing in Slovenia.

Lidija Dimkovska's books have been translated into 15 languages (English, German, Polish, Hungarian, Slovak, Czech, Romanian, Serbian, Slovenian, French, Croatian, Italian, Albanian, Bulgarian and Latvian).

She has taken part in numerous international literary festivals and has been a writer-in-residence in Iowa, London, Berlin, Vienna, Bucharest, Graz, Salzburg, Krems, Tirana, Okinawa, and Split.

Between 2016 and 2019, Lidija Dimkovska served as the president of the jury for the Vilenica International Literary Prize in Slovenia, and between 2013 and 2016 she was a member of the international jury for the Zbigniew Herbert International Literary Award in Warsaw, Poland.

Poems, excerpts from her novels, essays, interviews and reviews about her books have appeared in The Times Literary Supplement, American Poetry Review, World Literature Today, Frankfurter Allgemeine Zeitung, The Rumpus, Tin House, The Paris Review, The Literary Hub, Foreword, The White Review, Asymptote, Publishers Weekly, BBC World Service, Words Without Borders, Columbia Journal, Los Angeles Review, Boston Review and Poetry International, among other publications.

== Poetry ==
Рожби од Исток – 1992 ('Offspring from the East', together with Boris Cavkoski, Studentski Zbor Award for the Best Debut Poetry Book)

- Огнот на буквите – 1994 ('The Fire of the Letters')
- Изгризани нокти – 1998 ('Bitten Nails')
- Нобел против Нобел – 2001 ('Nobel versus Nobel')
- Идеална тежина – 2008 ('Ideal Weight', selected poetry)
- pH неутрална за животот и смртта – 2009 ('pH Neutral for Life and Death')
- Црно на бело – 2016 ('In Black and White')
- Гранична состојба– 2021 ('Boundary Situation', Miladinov Brothers Award for the Best Macedonian Poetry Book)

== Poetry in translation ==
In English:

- Do Not Awaken Them With Hammers (poetry in English translation by Ljubica Arsovska and Peggy Reid, Ugly Duckling Press, NY, USA, 2006)
- pH Neutral History (selected poetry in English translation by Ljubica Arsovska and Peggy Reid, Copper Canyon Press, USA, 2012, shortlisted for the Best Translated Book Award 2013 )
- What Is It Like? (selected poetry in English translation by Ljubica Arsovska, Patricia Marsh and Peggy Reid, Wrecking Ball, Hull, the UK, 2021) One of World Literature Today's 75 Notable Translations of 2022)

In German:

- Anständiges Mädchen ('Decent Girl', selected poems, translated into German by Alexander Sitzmann, Edition Korrespondenzen, Vienna, Austria, 2010, nomination for Brücke Berlin Preis 2012, Germany)
- Schwarz auf Weiss ('In Black and White'), poetry, translated into German by Alexander Sitzmann, Parasitenpresse, Köln, Germany, 2019)

In French:

- Comment c'est et Autres Poèmes ('What is it like? and Other Poems', selected poetry translated into French by Harita Wybrands, Voix Vives et Al Manar, France, 2018)

In Romanian:

- Meta-Spânzurare de Meta-Tei ('Meta- of Meta-Linden', selected poems translated into Romanian by Constantin Abăluță, Ioana Ieronim, Dagmar Maia Anoca and the author, Vinea, Bucharest, 2001, Poesis Poetry Award, Satu Mare, Romania)
- Diferentă ('Difference', selected poems translated in Romanian by Constantin Abăluță, Ioana Ieronim, Dagmar Maia Anoca and the author, Tracus Arte, Bucharest, 2012)

In Slovenian:

- Nobel Proti Nobelu ('Nobel vs. Nobel', translated into Slovenian by Aleš Mustar, Center za slovensko književnost, Ljubljana, 2004)
- pH Neutralna za Življenje in Smrt ('pH Neutral for Life and Death', translated into Slovenian by Aleš Mustar, Cankarjeva založba, Ljubljana, 2012)
- Črno na Belem ('In Black and White', translated into Slovenian by Aleš Mustar, Cankarjeva založba, Ljubljana, 2017)

In Croatian:

- Кako je To?('What is it like?', selected poetry in Croatian translation by Borjana Prošev-Oliver, Sandorf, Zagreb, 2022)

In Polish:

- pH Neutralna Wobec Žycia i Šmierci ('pH Neutral for Life and Death', poetry, translated into Polish by Danuta Cirlic Straszynska, Słowo Obraz Terytoria, Gdansk, Poland, 2015, nomination for the Poet of Freedom Award, Gdansk, Poland)

In Serbian:

- Најближе Најдаљем ('Closest to the Most Distant', selected poetry, translated into Serbian by Duško Novaković, KOV, Vršac, Serbia, Petru Krdu European Prize for Poetry 2016)

In Albanian:

- Tash Dhe Ketu ('Here and Now', selected poetry translated into Albanian by Clirim Qormemeti, Ditet e Naimit, Tetovo, North Macedonia, 2021, Naim Frasheri International Poetry Award )

== Prose ==
Скриена камера ('Hidden Camera') novel, 2004 Резервен живот ('A Spare Life') novel, 2012 Но-Уи ('Non-Oui') novel, 2016 Кога заминав од Карл Либкнехт ('When I left Karl Liebknecht') collection of short stories, 2019

== Prose in translation ==
In English:

A Spare Life, novel, translated into English by Christina E. Kramer, Two Lines Press, San Francisco, the USA, 2016, longlisted for Best Translated Book Award 2017

In German:

Reserveleben ('A Spare Life', novel, translated into German by Alexander Sitzmann, Litterae Slovenicae, Ljubljana, Slovenia/Drava, Graz, Austria, 2021)

In Polish:

Skrita Kamera ('Hidden Camera', novel, translated into Polish by Danuta Cirlic-Straszynska, založba PIW, Warsaw, Poland, 2010)

Non-Oui ('Non-Oui', novel, translated into Polish by Danuta Cirlic Straszynska, Bibliotek Analiz, Warsaw, Poland, 2019)

In Italian:

Vita di Scorta ('A Spare Life', novel, translated into Italian by Mariangela Biancofiore, Atmosphere Libri, Rim, Italia, 2017)

In Romanian:

Viata de Rezerva ('A Spare Life', novel, translated into Romanian by Octavian Blenchea, Casa cartii de stiinta, Cluj, Romania, 2019)

Camera Ascunsa ('Hidden Camera'), novel, translated into Romanian by Octavian Blenchea, Minerva, Bucharest, Romania, 2020)

In Slovenian:

Skrita Kamera ('Hidden Camera', novel, translated into Slovenian by Aleš Mustar, Cankarjeva, Ljubljana, Slovenia, 2006)

Rezervno Življenje ('A Spare Life', novel, translated into Slovenian by Aleš Mustar, Modrijan, Ljubljana. Slovenia, 2014)

Non-Oui ('Non-Oui', novel, translated into Slovenian by Aleš Mustar, Modrijan, Ljubljana, Slovenia, 2019)

In Croatian:

Rezervni Život ('A Spare Life', novel, translated into Croatian by Borislav Pavlovski, Ljevak, Zagreb, Croatia, 2016)

Skrivena Kamera ('Hidden Camera', novel, translated into Croatian by Borjana Prošev Oliver, VBZ, Zagreb, Croatia,2017)

Non-Oui ('Non-Oui', novel, translated into Croatian by Borjana Prošev Oliver, VBZ, Zagreb, Croatia, 2019)

Kad Smo Napuštili Karla Liebknechta ('When we left Karl Liebknecht', collection of short stories translated into Croatian by Borjana Prošev Oliver, Fraktura, Zagreb, Croatia, 2021)

In Bulgarian:

Скрита Камера ('Hidden Camera', novel, translated into Bulgarian by Aleksandra Liven, Balkani, Sofia, Bulgaria, 2010)

Резервен Живот ('A Spare Life', novel, translated into Bulgarian by Božidar Manev, Kolibri, Sofia, Bulgaria, 2014)

Но-Уи ('Non-Oui', novel, translated into Bulgarian by Božidar Manev, Kolibri, Sofia, Bulgaria, 2019)

In Slovak:

Skryta Kamera ('Hidden Camera', novel, translated into Slovak by Vera Prokesova, Kalligram, Bratislava, Slovak Republik, 2007)

In Czech:

Nahradni Život ('A Spare Life', novel, translated into Czech by Katerina Dimovska and Bohuslav Valek, Vetrne Mliny, Brno, Check Republik, 2016)

In Latvian:

Slepta Kamera ('Hidden Camera', novel, translated into Latvian by Ingmara Blode, Mansards, Riga, Latvia, 2018)

In Serbian:

Скривена Камера ('Hidden Camera', novel, translated into Serbian by Uroš Pajić, Agora, Novi Sad, Serbia, 2016)

Резервни Живот ('A Spare Life', novel, translated into Serbian by Milenko and Uroš Pajić, Agora, Novi Sad, Serbia, 2015)

In Albanian:

Kamera e Fshehte ('Hidden Camera', novel, translated into Albanian by Milena Selimi, Tirana Times, Tirana, Albania, 2019)

Jete Rezerve ('A Spare Life', novel, translated into Albanian by Miallaq Apostolofski, Ombra GVG, Tirana, Albania, 2022)

In Hungarian:

Tartalek Elet ('A Spare Life', novel, translated into Hungarian by Anamaria Czinegi Panzova, Napkut Kiado, Budapest, Hungary, 2014)

== Journals ==
Отаде Л. Американски дневник – 2017 (Beyond L. American Journal)

== Anthologies ==
- 20.млади.м@к.поети.00 (20.young.m@k.poets.00, 2000)
- Современа словенечка поезија ('Contemporary Slovenian Poetry', 2013)
- Iz jezika v jezik ('From Language to Language', 2014)
- Biće bolje – Bože ('Things Will Get Better', 2019)

== Awards and nominations ==
- Macedonian Writers' Association Award for the Best Prose Book of the Year for her novel 'Hidden Camera' (2005)
- Hubert-Burda-Preis für junge Lyrik (2009)
- Tudor Arghezi international poetry prize in Romania (2012)
- The Macedonian Writers' Association Award (2013)
- The EU Prize for Literature (2013)
- The Petru Krdu European Poetry Prize (2016)
- Brücke Berlin Preis (2013) (nominated)
- Best Translated Book Award (2013) (nominated)
- Poet of Freedom Award, Gdansk, Poland (nominated) (2016)
- Best Translated Book Award (nominated) 2017 in the USA for her novel 'A Spare Life' (published in English by Two Lines Press, SF, 2016)
- shortlisted for The Macedonian Writers' Association Award for the Best Prose Book of the Year for her novel 'Non-Oui' (2017)
- shortlisted for the Balkanika International Literary Award for her novel 'Grandma Non-Oui' (2017)
- Special Mention by European Cultural Heritage for the cycle of five short stories from her collection 'When I Left Karl Liebknecht' (2018)
- National Endowment for the Arts Translation Fellowship for Christina E. Kramer for the translation of Lidija Dimkovska’s novel 'Non-Oui' (2019)
- shortlisted for a cycle of five short stories from her short stories collection 'When I Left Karl Liebknecht' for the Specimen Prize 2020 (TO SPEAK EUROPE IN DIFFERENT LANGUAGES) in Switzerland (2020)
- shortlisted for The Macedonian Writers' Association Award for the Best Prose Book of the Year for her short stories collection 'When I Left Karl Liebknecht' (2020)
- The Cup of Immortality Award, Slovenia (2020)
- the Macedonian/Albanian Naim Frasheri International Poetry Award“Naim Frasheri”(2020)
- Браќа Миладиновци (Miladinov Brothers Award) of the Struga International Poetry Evenings (2021)
- shortlisted for the Macedonian Ацо Шопов (Aco Šopov) Award for the Best Book of Poetry (2022)
- shortlisted for the MIRA Prize of the Slovenian PEN Centre (2022)
