= Brajčino =

Brajčino Брајчино
- Village
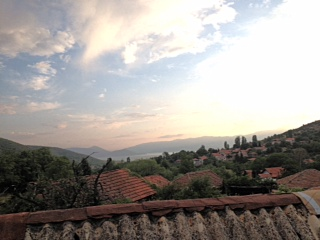
- Brajčino with Lake Prespa in the distance

- Location within North Macedonia
- Coordinates: 40°54′23″N 21°9′31″E
- Country: North Macedonia
- Region: Pelagonia
- Municipality: Resen

Population (2002)
  - Total: 134
- Time zone: UTC+1 (CET)
  - Summer (DST): UTC+2 (CEST)
- Area code: +389
- Car plates: RE

Brajčino (Macedonian: Брајчино, [ˈbrajtʃinɔ]) is a village in the Resen Municipality of North Macedonia, situated 6 kilometres (3.7 mi) from Lake Prespa, on Baba Mountain in Pelister National Park. The village is also located near the border with Greece. Brajčino's nature and old architecture draws both domestic and foreign tourists.

== History ==
Brajčino has two known archaeological sites, both dating from the Middle Ages. One of the sites, called St Athanasius, was a church and contained a graveyard. The other, known as Kula, consists of remains of a fortress.

In 1873, the village, called Raitchino at the time, was recorded as having 34 households and 92 male Macedonian residents. In the early 20th century, the village had 480 Macedonian residents.

During the Ilinden Uprising of 1903, Brajčino was looted and 77 of its houses were burnt down.

== Demographics ==
The village has 134 people as of the 2002 census, of which 133 are Macedonian and one is Serbian. Likewise, 133 residents declared the Macedonian language to be their mother tongue, while one declared Serbian.

Brajčino has suffered a steep population decline since peaking in 1991.

Ethnic group	census 1961		census 1971		census 1981		census 1991		census 1994		census 2002	
Ethnic group	Number	%	Number	%	Number	%	Number	%	Number	%	Number	%
Macedonians	791	99.5	681	98.8	738	97.8	800	98.8	211	99.5	133	99.3
others	4	0.5	8	1.2	17	2.2	10	1.2	1	0.5	1	0.7
Total	795		689		755		810		212		134	

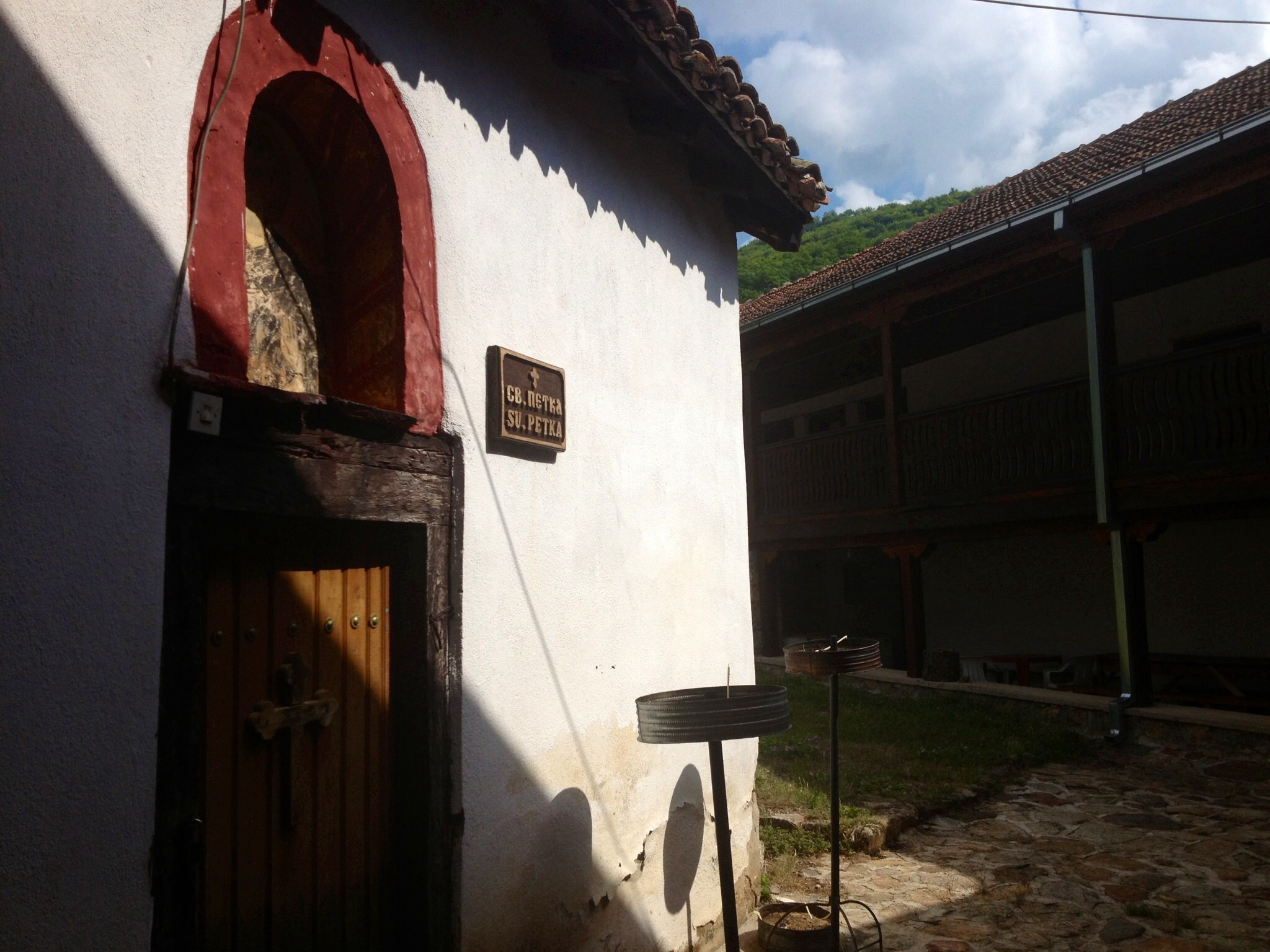
The Monastery of St Petka

=== Religion ===
In the latest census 67 residents, exactly one-half of the total population, declared their religion to be Orthodox Christianity, while the other half declared their religion to be 'other'.

Brajčino has five churches and one monastery. The churches include the Church of St Nicholas, built in 1872, the Church of St Elijah, built in 1919, the Church of the Holy Mother of God, St Archangel Church, and the Church of St Athanasius which was constructed near the archaeological remains of the Middle Aged church of the same name.

The village's monastery is St Petka, dedicated to Parascheva of the Balkans, and was built in two phases, the first in the 16th century and the second in the 18th century.

== Tourism ==
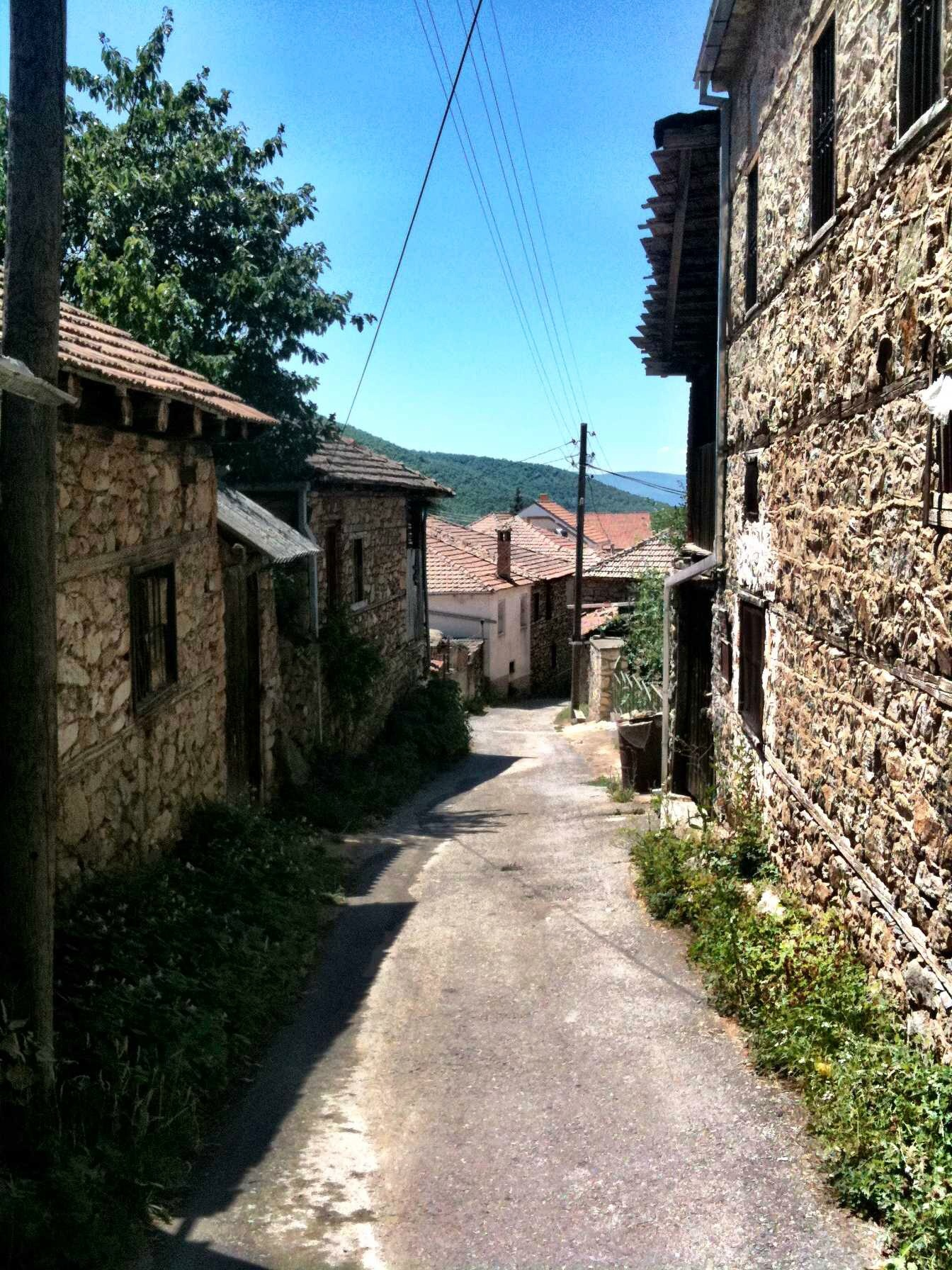
Typical Brajčino architecture

The village has a mountain nature-trail leading from the village to Golemo Ezero atop Baba Mountain. The trail links Prespa Lake with Pelister National Park and provides good views of the mountains.

Brajčino is also home to a centuries' old monastery St. Petka which holds its annual celebration every 7 and 8 August. There are also five other churches inside the village: St. Bogorodica, which is located in a cave high up on a mountain; St. Ilja, the village's first school; St. Atanas, said to be built on the spot of an older monastery destroyed by the Turks; St. Arangel, located high in the mountains; and St. Nikola.

The village is also known for its architecture. Some examples of Brajčino architecture include the Bey's House and Petre Kostov's House.

== People from Brajčino ==
- Meto Jovanovski, writer
- Lui Temelkovski, former Member of Canadian Parliament for the Ontario riding of Oak Ridges—Markham
