= Natalia Belchenko =

Ukrainian poet and translator

- Наталія Юліївна Бельченко
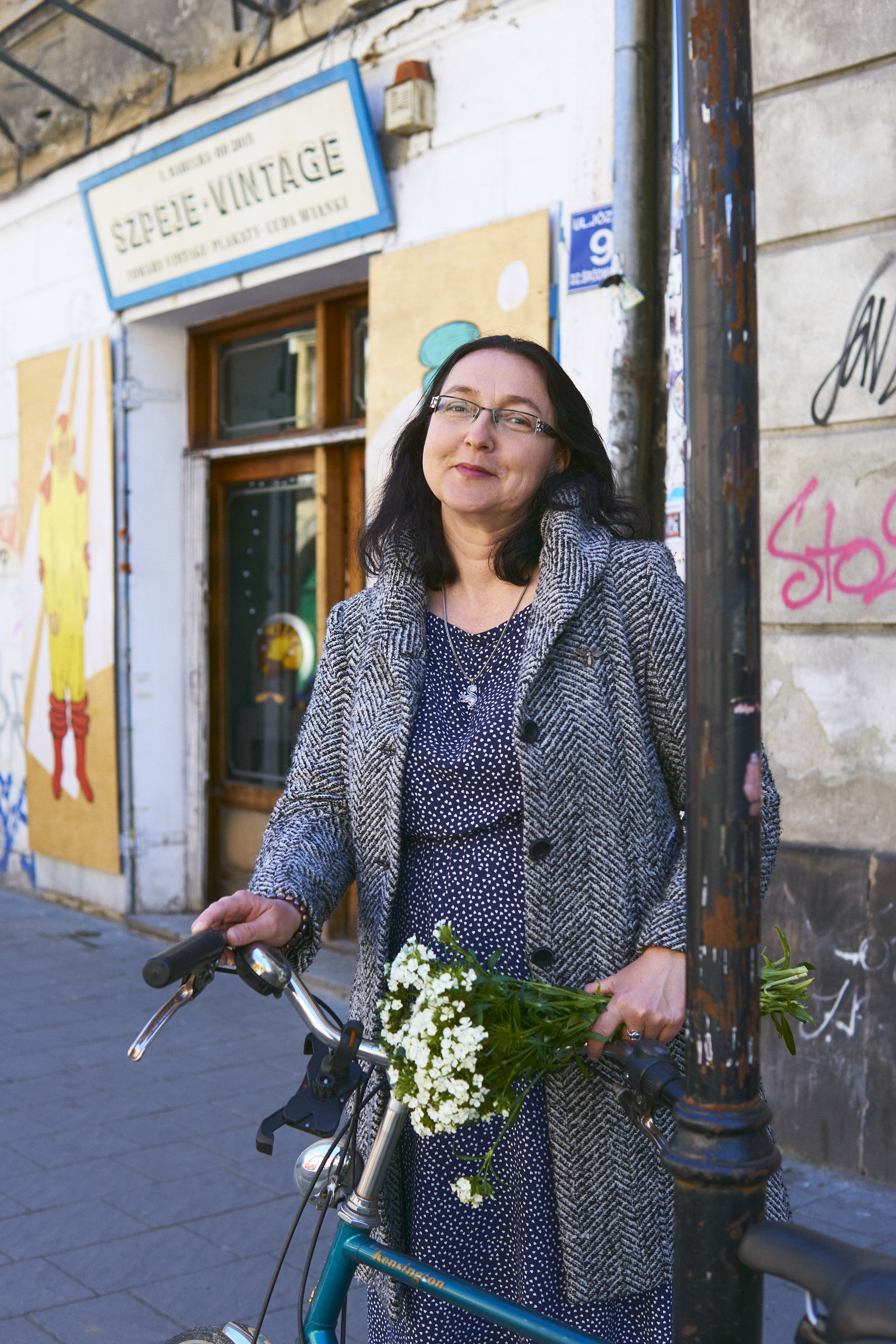
- Pictured 2024
- Born: 7 January 1973 (age 53); Kyiv
- Occupations: poet, translator

Natalia Belchenko, also spelled Beltchenko (born 7 January 1973) is a Ukrainian poet and translator.

== Early life and education ==
Natalia Belchenko was born on 7 January 1973 in Kyiv. She completed studies in Philology at the Taras Shevchenko National University of Kyiv.

== Career ==
Natalia Belchenko debuted in 1997, with a book titled Sleep Warden. She has published nine poetry collections. Belchenko is a laureate of several awards, including the Hubert-Burda-Preis für junge Lyrik (2000) and the National Writer’s Union of Ukraine Mykola Ushakov Prize in Literature (2006). In 2017 she won a scholarship from the Polish Ministry of Culture and National Heritage “Gaude Polonia” program. Her poems have been translated into German, French, English, Bulgarian, Korean, Dutch, Polish, Lithuanian, Latvian and Hebrew.

Apart from writing, Belchenko also works as a literary translator, translating from Ukrainian and Belarusian into Russian and from Polish to Ukrainian. She has translated, among others, works by Vasyl Makhno, Marianna Kiyanovska, Olesya Mamchich, Yuriy Izdryk, Zuzanna Ginczanka, Jarosław Iwaszkiewicz and Bolesław Leśmian. She is a recipient of "Metaphor" Translation Award (2014) and placed third in an International competition for the best Russian, Belarusian and Ukrainian translations of Wisława Szymborska poetry (2015).

Belchenko is a member of PEN Ukraine.

== Publications ==
- Sleep Warden, 1997
- Transit, 1998
- Karman imën Pocket of Names, 2002
- Creature in the Landscape, 2006
- Ответные губы (Reciprocal Lips), 2008
- A Wanderer/Fugitive, 2010
- Zrimorodok, 2013
- Знаки і знади (Signs and temptations), 2018
