= Petr Borkovec =

Czech poet, translator, and journalist

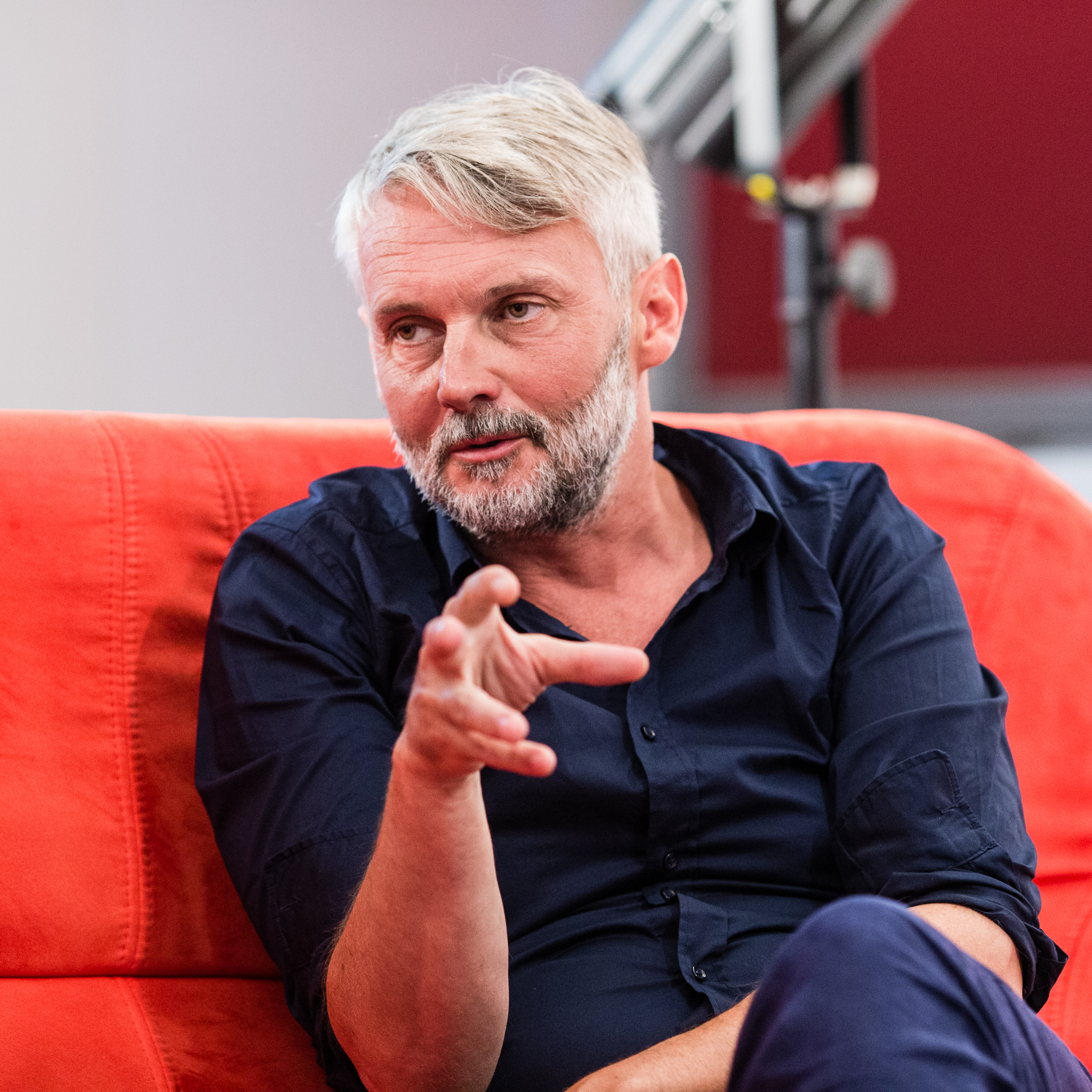
- Borkovec, Authors' Reading Month 2019, Wrocław (Poland)
- Born: April 17, 1970 (age 56)
- Writing career
- Language: Czech

Petr Borkovec (April 17, 1970, Louňovice pod Blaníkem) is a Czech poet, translator and journalist.

== Life and career ==
He studied Czech language and literature at the Philosophical Faculty of the Charles University but did not finish his studies.

His poems have been translated into almost all European languages. His books have been published in Austria and in Italy. Borkovec translates mostly 20th-century Russian poetry.

== Works ==
=== Poetry ===
- Prostírání do tichého, Pražská imaginace, 1990
- Poustevna, věštírna, loutkárna, Mladá fronta, 1991
- Ochoz, Mladá fronta, 1994
- Ze tří knih = Aus drei Büchern, Buchwerkstatt Thanhäuser, 1995 (German translation)
- Mezi oknem, stolem a postelí, Český spisovatel, 1996
- Polní práce, Mladá fronta, 1998
- Feldarbeit: Gedichte, Edition Korrespondenzen, 2001 (German translation)
- A. B. A. F., Opus, 2002
- Needle-book, Paseka, 2003
- Nadelbuch: Gedichte, Edition Korrespondenzen, 2004 (German translation)
- Vnitrozemí, Fra, 2005
- Amselfassade. Berlin-Notate, Friedenauer Presse, 2006 (German translation)
- Berlínský sešit / Zápisky ze Saint-Nazaire, Fra, 2008
- From the Interior: Poems 1995-2005, Seren, 2008 (English translation)
- Jedna věta, Revolver Revue, 2011
- Milostné básně, Fra, 2012
- Liebesgedichte, Edition Korrespondenzen, 2014 (German translation)

=== Anthologies ===
- Krajiny milosti. Antologie české duchovní lyriky XX. století, 1994
- Sborník k pětasedmdesátinám Ivana Slavíka, 1995.

=== Translations ===
- U řek babylónských, Torst, 1996 - anthology of Russian emigrant poetry
- Sophocles: Král Oidipús, premiered at HaDivadlo in 1998, in print by Větrné mlýny in 1999 — translated with Matyáš Havrda
- Jasná luna v prázdných horách, Paseka, 2001 — anthology of classical Korean poetry, with Vladimír Pucek
- Aischylos: Oresteia, premiered a published by the National Theatre June 18, 2002 — translated with Matyáš Havrda
- Vladimir Nabokov: Ut pictura poesis, Triáda, 2002) — translated with Jaroslav Kabíček
- Vladislav Khodasevich: Těžká lyra, Opus, 2004 — poems translated by Petr Borkovec, esseys translated by Miluše Zadražilová
- Yuri Odartschenko: Verše do alba, Fra, 2005
- Yevgeny Rein: Bylo, byli, byla, byl…, Opus, 2005

His translations of poems by authors such as Zinaida Gippius, Georgy Ivanov, Joseph Brodsky were published in magazines.

== Awards ==
- 1995 — Cena Jiřího Ortena (Jiří Orten Award) in 1994 for his book Ochoz
- 2001 — Hubert-Burda-Preis and Norbert-C.-Kaser-Preis for the German translation of his book Polní práce
- 2002 — Prémie Tomáše Hrácha for his translation of Oresteia (with Matyáš Havrda)
- 2004 — Cena Josefa Jungmanna (main creative award) for his translation of a part of Heavy Lyre by Vladislav Khodasevich
