= Gustav Krklec =

Croatian writer and translator

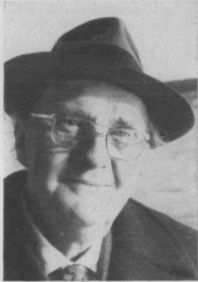
Gustav Krklec in 1969

Gustav Krklec (pronounced [gǔ:staʋ kr̩̂klet͡s]; 23 June 1899 – 30 October 1977) was a Croatian writer and translator.

Krklec was born in 1899 in Udbinja near Karlovac. In 1900, he moved with his family to Maruševec, a village near Varaždin. He studied in Vienna and Zagreb. In his youth, he worked as a journalist. Since 1922 he lived in Belgrade, working as a secretary at the stock exchange, and as an editor of Nolit. In 1945 he returned to Zagreb, where he worked as an editor in several publishing houses and magazines.

In the period 1950–1954 he served as the president of Matica hrvatska.

He is one of the most significant Croatian poets of the first half of 20th century. His verses are marked by simplicity and the suggestibility of expression, by formal and metric artistry, and are characterised by the motifs of life's joy, anxiety and solitude.

His nephew Nikola Mauracher (Krklec), the son of his eldest brother Valentin, lives in Vienna, owner of "Pension Mozart" and is married to the Austrian-Russian conductor and pianist Gal Rasché.

His published poetical collections include:

- Lirika (1919)
- Srebrna cesta (1921)
- Nove pjesme (1923)
- Ljubav ptica (1926)
- Izlet u nebo (1928)
- San pod brezom (1940)
- Darovi za bezimenu (1942)
- Tamnica vremena (1944)

He also wrote literary critics, essays and feuilletons:

- Lica i krajolici (1954)
- Pisma Martina Lipnjaka iz provincije (1956)
- Noćno iverje (1960)

He also wrote a novel Beskućnici (1921). He translated works from German, Russian, Czech and Slovene. He died in Zagreb.

Cultural offices
Preceded by Mihovil Nikolić	President of Matica hrvatska 1950–1954	Succeeded by Jakša Ravlić
Preceded by Ivo Frangeš	President of the Association of Writers of Yugoslavia; 1974-1977	Succeeded by Sreten Asanović
