= Association of Writers of Yugoslavia =

Yugoslavian organization

- Savez književnika Jugoslavije (Serbo-Croatian); Zveza književnikov Jugoslavije (Slovene); Сојуз на писателите на Југославија (Macedonian)
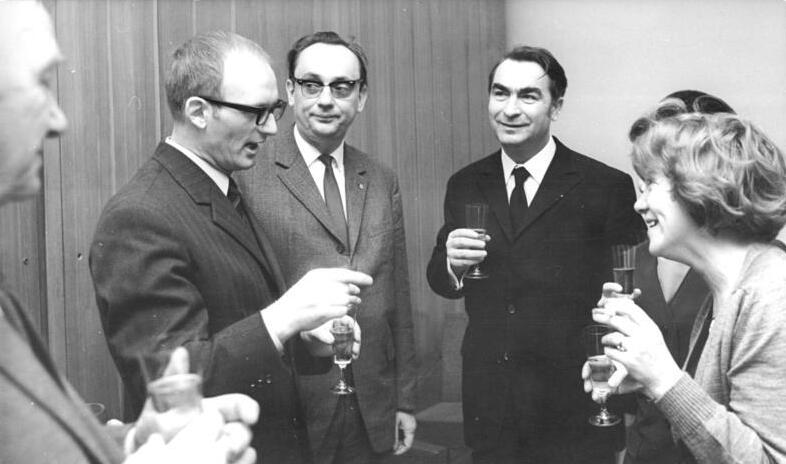
- The First Secretary of the Deutscher Schriftstellerverband Gerhard Henniger and the President of the Association of Writers of Yugoslavia, Aco Šopov signing the cooperation agreement on 12 February 1970 in East Berlin
- Formation: 1946
- Founded at: Belgrade
- Dissolved: 1990
- Type: writers professional organization
- Legal status: umbrella organisation
- Location: SFR Yugoslavia

The Association of Writers of Yugoslavia or the Yugoslav Writer's Union (Serbo-Croatian: Savez književnika Jugoslavije, Slovene: Zveza književnikov Jugoslavije, Macedonian: Сојуз на писателите на Југославија, romanized: Sojuz na pisatelite na Jugoslavija) was an umbrella organisation of 6 of the constituent republics' writers associations in the Socialist Federal Republic of Yugoslavia. The Association coordinated cooperation between its member organizations. From 1965 onwards, the Association was transformed into a coordination body of its members at the time; the Association of Writers of Bosnia and Herzegovina, the Association of Writers of Montenegro, the Croatian Writers' Association, the Association of Writers of Serbia, Association of Writers of Macedonia and the Slovene Writers' Association. Ivo Andrić was unanimously elected as the first president of the Association in 1946.

With progressive decentralisation and confederalisation of Yugoslavia itself, exemplified in the 1974 Yugoslav Constitution, the importance of the federal association became less prominent from 1970s onwards with republican association attaining more central place in literary life of the country.

Following the last Congress in 1985 in Novi Sad association became one of the first federal institutions which experienced paralyzing querals leading to effective and never formally declared dissolution in 1990. The crisis deepened already in 1986 when Serbian republican branch proposed Miodrag Bulatović as the new president of the association's rotating presidency to which Serbian candidate was to be elected at the time. This candidate was rejected by Slovenian, Kosovan, Montenegrin and Croatian branch whose delegates claimed that the candidate was hostile to other Yugoslav nations.

== History ==
Following the 1948 Tito-Stalin split increased plurality developed in Yugoslav literature with Miroslav Krleža's speech at the Third Congress of the Association in Ljubljana in 1952, which epitomised artistic distancing from previously promoted socialist realism.

In 1956, the Association sent Petar Guberina as the Yugoslav observer representative to the Congress of Black Writers and Artists in Paris who attended the second Congress in Rome in 1959 as well.

In 1958, the Association nominated Yugoslav author Ivo Andrić as its first ever candidate for the Nobel Prize in Literature, a prize he would receive in 1961.

In 1966 the Association broke off all formal relations with the Union of Writers of Bulgaria after Bulgarian partners rejected to sign a document in Macedonian language. Relations were not re-established until the end of the existence of the Association as the Yugoslav side insisted that all of the agreements will be signed in Bulgarian and Macedonian language.

== Congresses ==
- 1st Congress, Belgrade, PR Serbia (17–19 November 1946)

The event took place at the Ilija M. Kolarac Endowment building with 40 delegates from Serbia, 40 from Croatia, 25 from Slovenia, 9 from Bosnia and Herzegovina, 6 from Vojvodina, 6 from Macedonia and 3 from Montenegro in attendance as well as guests from embassies of France, Poland, Czechoslovakia, Albania, Bulgaria, Romania and Hungary with writer delegates from those countries as well as from Poland and USSR. Delegates included minority communities representatives for Hungarians, Romanians and Slovaks. Ivo Andrić was elected president and Vladimir Nazor honorary president of the Association.

- 2nd Congress, Zagreb, PR Croatia (26–29 December 1949)

The event took place at the Croatian Music Institute building. The event was used as a platform to represent Yugoslav literary production and literature promotion and inter-Yugoslav exchange efforts since 1946.

- 3rd Congress, Ljubljana, PR Slovenia (1952)
- 4th Congress, Ohrid, PR Macedonia (15–17 September 1955)
- 5th Congress, Belgrade, PR Serbia (25–28 November 1958)
- 6th Congress, Sarajevo, PR Bosnia and Herzegovina (16–18 September 1961)
- 7th Congress, Titograd, PR Montenegro (24–26 September 1964)

The event was marked by four competing proposals for the substantial statutory reform of the association without shared agreement to accept any of them in full. The first proposal by the Serbian republican branch was introduced on 20 May 1964 recommending introduction of permanent executive secretariat and obligatory rotation in leadership among republican branches. Croatian proposal recommended that seat of the association should be rotated every three years instead of permanent location in Belgrade and accepted the idea on the rotation of leadership together with seat rotation. Slovenian proposal recommended that since organisation formally started to function as a coordination it's bodies should consist of delegated members of republican branches instead of elected independent representatives or secretariat. The last proposal was introduced by Dobrica Ćosić with independent group of writers which included Antonije Isaković, Oskar Davičo, Aleksandar Tišma and others recommending introduction of new type of organisation in parallel with territorial principle in which writers would cooperate on the level of Yugoslavia based on their specific interests and affinities. The Congress decided to take all of the proposals for further analysis.

- Extraordinary Congress, Belgrade, SR Serbia (21–22 December 1965)
- 8th Congress, Belgrade, SR Serbia (2-4 October 1975)
- 9th Congress, Novi Sad, SAP Vojvodina, SR Serbia (15–20 April 1985)
- 10th Congress, Vrnjačka Banja, SR Serbia (9–11 January 1990, CANCELLED ahead after Slovenian, Croatian, Kosovo and Macedonian branches refused to attend)

== Presidents ==
- Ivo Andrić (1946–1952)
- Josip Vidmar (1952–1958)
- Miroslav Krleža (1958–1961)
- Blaže Koneski (1961–1964)
- Meša Selimović (1964–1965)
- Matej Bor (1965–1968)
- Aco Šopov (1968–1970)
- Ivo Frangeš (1970–1972)
- Gustav Krklec (1974–1977)
- Sreten Asanović (1979–1981)
- Duško Roksandić (1981–1982)
- Azem Shkreli (1982–1983)
- Kole Čašule (1984–1985)
- Ciril Zlobec (1985–1986)
  - vacant (1986–1988); Serbian candidate Miodrag Bulatović not elected due to opposition from five out of eight republican and provincial associations (those of Slovenia, Croatia, Montenegro, Kosovo and Vojvodina)
- Slobodan Selenić (1988–1990)
- Ottó Tolnai (1990)

== See also ==
- Languages of Yugoslavia
- Bosnian literature
- Croatian literature
- Macedonian literature
- Montenegrin literature
- Serbian literature
- Slovene literature
