= Sreten Asanović =

Montenegrin writer (1931–2016)

Sreten Asanović (Serbian Cyrillic: Сретен Асановић; 22 February 1931 – 3 June 2016) was a Montenegrin author who established the short-story genre in that country. Asanović was born in Donji Kokoti, near Podgorica. He completed teacher-training school, focusing on preschool education.

Asanović published his first story in the magazine Omladinski pokret, in which he had already contributed movie reviews and written a column ("From the Lives of Famous People"). From 1957 to 1960, he was editor-in-chief of the Titograd (Podgorica) magazine Susreti; editor for the Sarajevo magazine Oslobodjenje from 1960 to 1962; first editor-in-chief of the journal Odjek from 1963 to 1965; secretary of the Commission for Culture and Art in Belgrade from 1965 to 1972, and editor-in-chief of the Titograd magazine Stvaranje from 1973 to 1989.

Since the 1960s, he was actively supporting the theory about the existing of the separate Montenegrin language.

== Published works ==
=== Books ===
- Dugi trenuci (Long Moments). Cetinje: Narodna knjiga (1956)
- Ne gledaj u sunce (Don’t Look at the Sun). Cetinje: Obod (1960)
- Igra Vatrom (Playing with Fire). Sarajevo: Svjetlost (1966)
- Lijepa Smrt (Beautiful Death, with a preface by Ratko Bozovic). Titograd: Graficki zavod – Luca (1971)
- Opojno pice (Intoxicating Drink, with a preface by Milo Kralj). Belgrade: Rad (1977)
- Noc na golom brdu (Night on Barren Hill). Zagreb: Mladost (1980)
- O kulturi i stvaralastvu (On Culture and the Act of Creation) (articles). Belgrade: Radnicka stampa (1981)
- Lice kao zemlja (A Face Like Earth, in a collection of stories by Gojko Antic with a preface by Mirjana Strcic). Niksic: Univerzitetska rijec (1988)
- Putnik (Traveller, a novel). Cetinje: Dignitas, 1994.
- Martiri i pelegrini (Martyrs and Pilgrims). Ulcinj: Plima, 2000.
- Selected works (four volumes). Ulcinj: Plima (2003)
- Nomina. Ulcinj: Plima, 2006.
- Zvijezde padaju (The Stars are Falling, with a preface and postscript by Jovan Nikolaidis). Zagreb: NZCH and Plima.
- Kratke price (Short stories). Cetinje Podgorica: OKF and Pobjeda, 2015.

=== Other work ===
Asanović appears in Sablja (Sabre), an anthology of stories edited by Camil Sijaric and published by Luca. He supplied prefaces, postscripts and notes to Cedo Vukovic's Selection of Montenegrin 19th-Century Travelogues. Asanović's radio dramas To je ta zvijezda (That’s the Star) and Samo kisa i vjetar (Only Rain and Wind) have been performed.He has written screenplays for documentaries about Montenegrin culture, the town of Cetinje and the 1979 earthquake in 1979. Asanović was president of the Writers' Association of Montenegro (1973–1976), vice-president of the Writers' Union of Yugoslavia (1976–1979), president of the Writers' Union of Yugoslavia (1979–1981), an editorial-board member of the Lexicographic Institute of Zagreb and an editor in its literature department.

Asanović's work is included in domestic and foreign encyclopedias, biographies and academic literature. Lijepa smrt has been translated into Albanian (Vdekje e hieshme, Pristina, Rilindija 1975), Macedonian (Ubava smrt, Skopje, Misla, 1977), Russian (Raskazi, Moscow, Inostrana literatura 1977), Romanian (Frumoasa moarte, Bucharest, Univers 1978) and Italian (La bella morte, Salerno-Rome, Ripostes 1993). Asanovic's stories have been published in newspapers, magazines and anthologies on more than 20 languages.

== Awards ==
- Trinaestojulska nagrada Skupstine SR Crne Gore (Montenegro's highest national award) for Lijepa Smrt, 1972
- Oslobodjenje Titograda (Liberation of Podgorica Award) for best literary work (Igra vatrom), 1967
- Goranova nagrada (Goran Award) for best Serbo-Croatian book of the year (Noc na Golom Brdu), 1981
- NR Montenegro Education Council Award for the short story "Dzelat" ("The Executor"), 1954
- Writers Association of Montenegro Award for the short-story collection Dugi trenuci (Long Moments), 1957
- Stvaranje (Creation Magazine) Award for "Uspravani konjanik" ("The Sleepy Horseman"), 1959
- Medal of Brotherhood and Unity, 1976

Preceded by Gustav Krklec	President of the Association of Writers of Yugoslavia; 1979–1981	Succeeded by Duško Roksandić
