= Kole Čašule =

Macedonian essayist, dramatist, short story writer

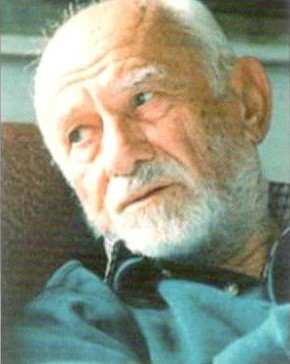
Kole Čašule

Kole Čašule (Cyrillic: Коле Чашуле; March 2, 1921 – September 22, 2009) was a Macedonian and Yugoslav essayist, dramatist, short story writer and ambassador. Čašule was one of the founders of the Macedonian Writers' Association and served as the organization's president.

== Life ==
Čašule was born as Nikola Kepev оn Маrch 2, 1921, in the town of Prilep, Kingdom of Yugoslavia (present-day North Macedonia), to a Bulgarian Exarchist family. He completed his primary education in his hometown and his secondary education in Bitola. Until 1918, his father Ilija Kepev was the director of a Bulgarian high school. His maternal uncle Ilija Čašule adopted him in 1925 and he ended up taking his surname. From 1938 until the beginning of the World War II, he studied medicine at the University of Belgrade. After the invasion of Yugoslavia by the Axis powers during World War II, he returned to Prilep. He was a member of the partisan communist group that started the communist resistance against Bulgarian occupation on October 11, 1941, in Prilep. In 1942, Čašule was arrested and sentenced in Bulgaria to death, as the organizer of an assassination attempt against the former Internal Macedonian Revolutionary Organization activist Mane Machkov. His sentence was commuted to life imprisonment and he was imprisoned in Idrizovo near Skopje. He escaped from prison in 1944. During the 1940s, he was a public prosecutor in the show trials against people of the Macedonian Bulgarian movement and the Macedonian movement, which resulted in killings and repressions. In 1946, Čašule and Lazar Mojsov, as members of the judicial council, sentenced Metodija Andonov-Čento to 11 years in prison.

Čašule worked as the editor of three Macedonian magazines, Nov den, Razgledi and Sovremenost. He also served as the director of Radio Skopje and the Drama Director for the Macedonian National Theatre. Čašule also was a Minister of Culture of the People's Republic of Macedonia, as well as a member of the Writers' Association of Macedonia and Yugoslavia. He wrote novels and was part of the first generation of Macedonian prose writers. Čašule was named an honorary member of the Macedonian Academy of Sciences and Arts. He was the recipient of several major Yugoslav awards, including the Marin Drzić for dramatic work, the July 4 award, the Sterijina nagrada, the October 11 award, the Stale Popov and the Misla, which he was awarded for his entire body of work.

Along with writer Vlado Maleski, he was sent to the United States on a mission to determine the condition of the Macedonian emigration there. Afterwards, Čašule became the general consul in Toronto, Canada. On February 28, 1963, he was appointed as a Yugoslav ambassador to Bolivia and served in that position until 1965. As an ambassador, he focused on strengthening relations between the two countries. He organized Yugoslav president Josip Broz Tito's visit to Bolivia, which took place from September 28 to October 3, 1963, at the invitation of the Bolivian president, Víctor Paz Estenssoro. Apart from Tito, he also hosted various Yugoslav political and economic delegations that visited Bolivia and had meetings with the Bolivian authorities. During his term, a coup d'état took place in November 1964, which overthrew Estenssoro and established a military dictatorship. He secured foreign diplomats in the country and established relations with the new government. On November 17, 1970, Čašule became an ambassador to Peru, serving in the position until 1975. During that period, he established close ties with the country's leadership and contributed to the development of economic ties, especially in the reconstruction of the city of Chimbote following the May 1970 earthquake. During his stay in Peru, he befriended prominent cultural figures of the time, especially Mario Vargas Llosa. On September 26, 1978, Čašule was appointed as an ambassador to Brazil, remaining in that position until 1981. He ensured that good relations between Brazil and Yugoslavia were maintained, while also writing prose intensively. In Brazil, he collected handicrafts from painters, sculptors, and craftsmen to remind him of his stay when he returned home. For his work as ambassador in these three South American countries, he received recognitions. Čašule died in Skopje on September 22, 2009, at the age of 88.

== Notable works ==
- 1948 – An Evening (Edna večer)
- 1950 – The Collective (Zadruga)
- 1957 – Twig in the Wind (Vejka na vetrot)
- 1958 – Furrow (Brazda)
- 1960 – Darkness (Crnila)
- 1962 – The Game (Igra)

Preceded by Azem Shkreli	President of the Association of Writers of Yugoslavia; 1984-1985	Succeeded by Ciril Zlobec
