= Gane Todorovski =

Gane Todorvski
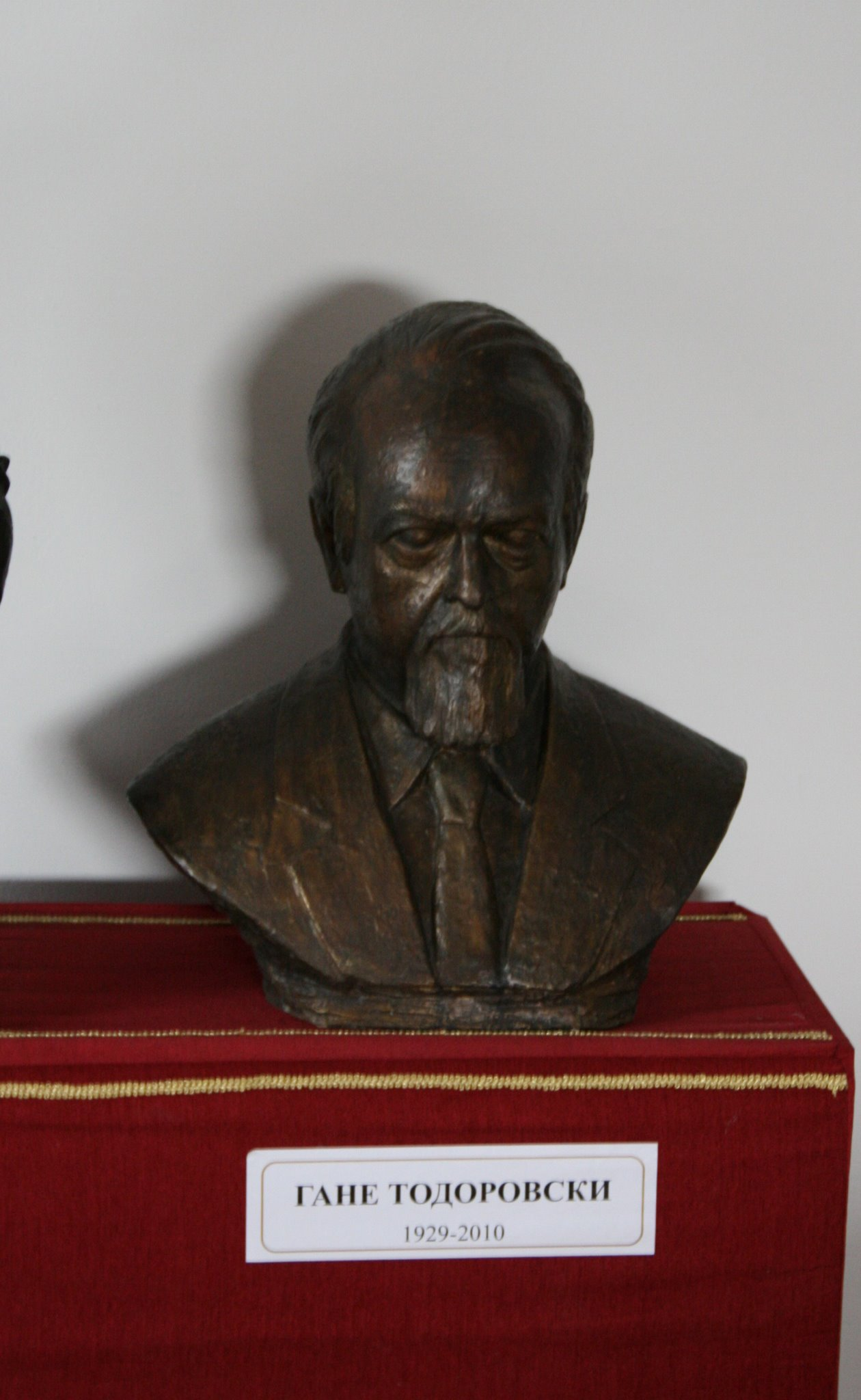
- Born: 11 May 1929; Skopje, Kingdom of Yugoslavia (now North Macedonia)
- Died: 22 May 2010 (aged 81); Skopje, North Macedonia
- Education: graduated philosopher and academic
- Occupations: poet, translator, professor, essayist, literary critic, historian and publicist
- Relatives: Trajko Todorovski (father)

Dragan "Gane" Todorovski (11 May 1929 – 22 May 2010) was a Macedonian poet, translator, essayist, literary critic, and historian, publicist.

== Biography ==
Graduated from the Faculty of Philosophy, University SS. Cyril and Methodius in Skopje, where he gained his PhD with the thesis "Slavs Veda and its mystificators". Worked as a journalist with "Tanjug", "Mlad borec" and "Studentski zbor". He was a long-time professor of Croatian and Macedonian Literature of 19th century at the Faculty of Philology in Skopje, as well as a one-time president of the Macedonian Writers' Association (1969-1971) and (1985–86), President of the Board of the Struga Poetry Evenings Festival, and editor-in-chief of the journal "Mlada literatura".

He started his literary activity immediately after the liberation, in "Nova Makedonija", "Pionerski Vesnik", "Nov den" and others. He mainly deals with poetry and translations, has published several collections of poetry and also deals with criticism and essays. He was the editor of the literary magazines: "Sovremenost", "Idnina", "Kulturen zivot", "Mlada literatura", "Razgledi" and others. He also wrote screenplays and debuted with the documentary "Forgiveness" (1963) as a co-writer.

In 1951 he became a member of the Writers' Association of Macedonia, and on two occasions (1969 - 1971 and 1985 - 1986) he was its president. He was also president of the Council of the Struga Poetry Evenings (1970 - 1971) and editor-in-chief of the magazine "Mlada literatura". He has been a member of MANU since 1997.

In 1989, Todorovski was elected the first president of the Movement for All-Macedonian Action. Later appointed as the first ambassador of the Republic of North Macedonia (then Republic of Macedonia) to the Russian Federation.

== Death ==
The academician Gane Todorovski died 22 May 2010, late Saturday in Skopje at the age of 81, the Macedonian Academy of Sciences and Arts, Macedonian Writers' Association and Faculty of Philology "Blaze Koneski" within SS. Cyril and Methodius University reported Sunday.

A joint commemorative session was held at 10:30h on 26 May (Wednesday) at the Macedonian Academy of Sciences and Arts.

He was buried in the church "Holy Savior" in the Skopje village Kozle on 26 May 2010. The liturgy was officiated by the Archbishop of the Macedonian Orthodox Church, Stefan. His last wish was to be buried in this village and for his song "Covenant" to be read at the funeral. His wish was granted.

== Works ==
- In the mornings (poetry, 1951),
- Disturbing sounds (poetry, 1953),
- Peaceful step (poetry, 1956),
- Rainbow (poetry, 1960),
- Apotheosis of the working day (poetry, 1964),
- Predecessors of Misirkov (studies and comments, 1968),
- Bitter sips of disquiet (poetry, 1970),
- A rather ugly day (poetry, 1974),
- A treatise on those who love the Sun (essays and notes, 1974),
- Slavs Veda (1979),
- Magic Contest (literary notes, 1979),
- The people of Skopje (poetry, 1981),
- Further from enthusiasm, closer to grief (studies, 1983),
- With a word to the word (studies and criticism, 1985),
- An expedition to Helicon (studies, 1987),
- Trouble,
- Treachery,
- Sleeplessness (poetry, 1987),
- Inevitable Curiosities (studies, notes, criticism, 1987),
- The unattainable (poetry, 1995),
- A lonely traveller (poetry in English, 1996).

== Awards ==
- "Koco Racin",
- "11th October",
- "13th November",
- "Miladinov Brothers",
- "Kliment Ohridski",
- "Goce Delcev",
- "Dimitar Mitrev",
- the Award for his entire work by "Misla" and the "Grigor Prlicev",
- "Kiril Pejcinovic",
- "Zlatno pero" Awards for translation.
