= Čedo Vuković =

Montenegrin writer

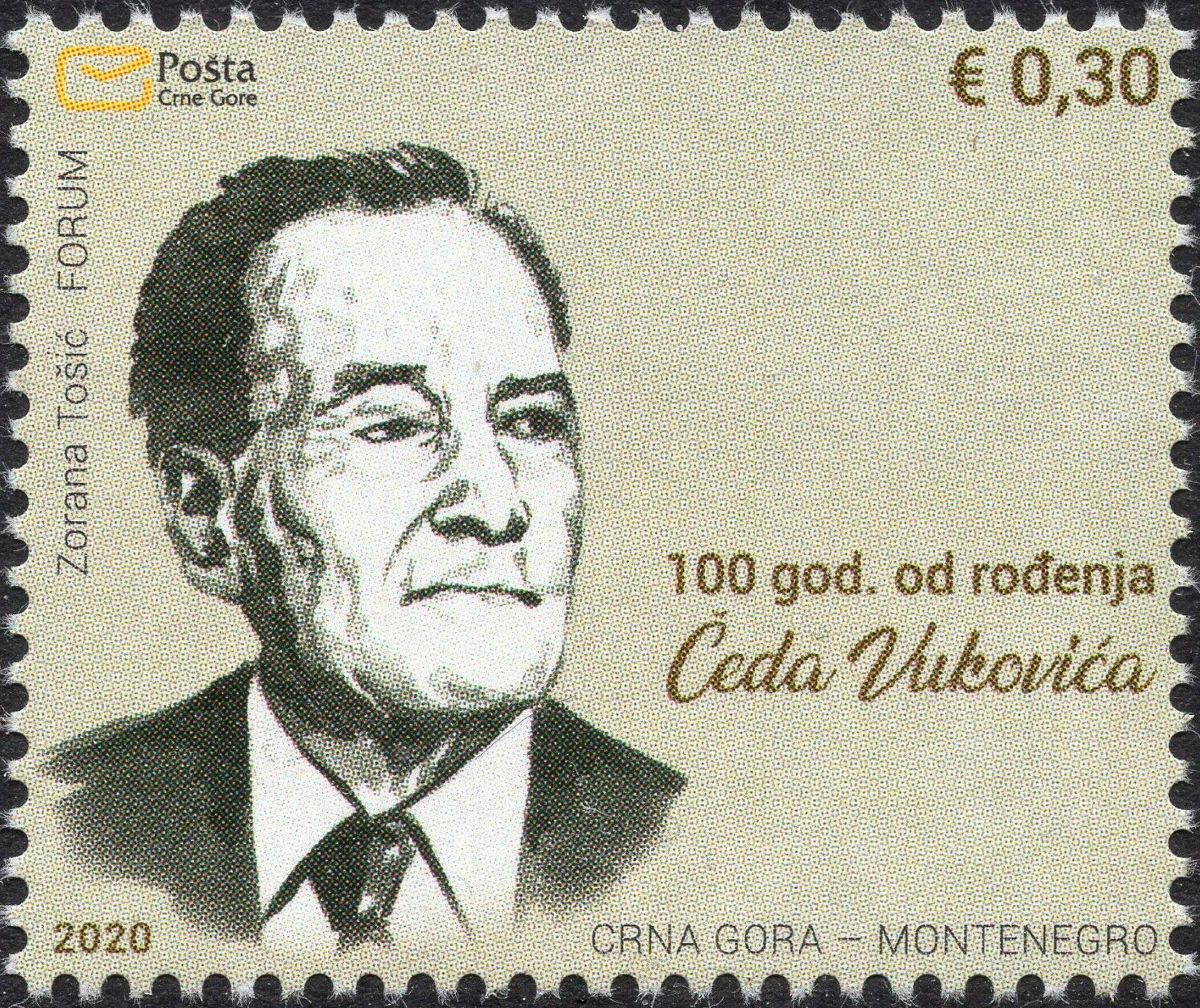
Vuković on a 2020 stamp of Montenegro

Čedo Vuković (Montenegrin Cyrillic: Чедо Вуковић; 28 September 1920 – 7 April 2014) was a Montenegrin writer.

Vuković was born in Đulići, Andrijevica municipality in north-eastern Montenegro. His early novel, "Mrtvo duboko", is a story written about hiding of a Partisan from Chetniks in an isolated Montenegrin village called Mrtvo Duboko (which literary means Deep Dead) during World War II. Among his other works are books for children "Svemoćno oko" (Allmighty Eye), "Letjelica profesora Bistrouma" (Flying Machine of Professor Brightmind) and "Tim Lavlje srce" (Lion-heart Team). He wrote many other novels including "Visine" and "Rustem", dramatic works like "Bijele vrane" and "Harmonija", and short-story collections. He lived in Podgorica and Budva and was a member of Montenegrin Academy of Sciences and Arts. He died in Budva on 7 April 2014 after a long illness.
