= Mirela Ivanova =

Mirela Ivanova (Bulgarian: Мирела Иванова) (born 11 May 1962 in Sofia) is one of the most famous modern Bulgarian poets. Her poems have been translated into many different languages, including German and English.

== Life ==
She studied at a German language school in Sofia and graduated in Bulgarian and Russian Philology at the Plovdiv University.

Mirela Ivanova writes essays, reviews on fiction and theatre performances, deals with literature history, and translates from the German language. She is an author of scenarios for documentary films. In 1994 she translated and published an anthology of modern German poetry, titled The Wandering of Stones. She has also translated German works of Sarah Kirsch, Elke Erb, Gregor Laschen, Ernest Wicher, Durs Grünbein, Uwe Kolbe, as well as Ernst Gombrich's popular work History of Mankind for Young Readers. Ivanova's poems have been translated into various languages.

== Bibliography ==
- Stone Wings
- Whispers
- Lonely Game
- Memory for Details
- Dismantle Toys
- Eclecticism
