= Nikola Madžirov =

Macedonian poet, editor and translator

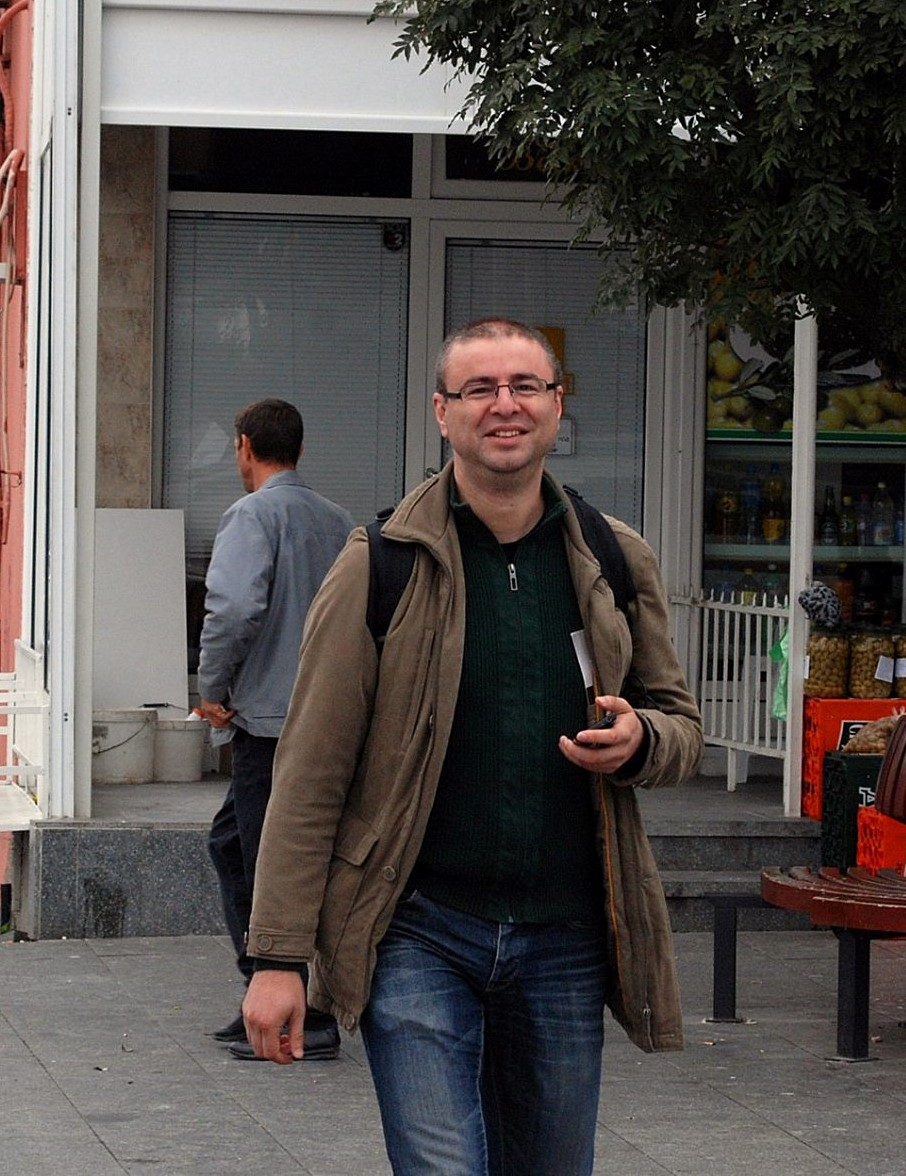
- Photo of Nikola Madzirov
- Born: May 27, 1973 (age 53); Strumica, SFR Yugoslavia (now North Macedonia)
- Citizenship: Macedonian
- Occupations: Author, poet, essayist, translator
- Writing career
- Language: English, Macedonian
- Notable works: Remnants of Another Age, Premesten kamen, A Way of Existing, Asphalt, yet sky
- Notable awards: Miladinov Brothers poetry prize

Nikola Madžirov is a Macedonian poet, editor and translator. He has been a guest at several literary festivals across the globe and has been translated into more than thirty languages. He is a recipient of Hubert Burda European Poetry Award, the Miladinov Brothers poetry prize and has been a writer in residence at the University of Iowa’s International Writing Program and LiteraturRaum in Berlin. His works have appeared in magazines like Words Without Borders, Poetry Foundation, and World Literature Today.

== Life ==
Nikola was born on 27 May 1973 in Strumica, then in SFR Yugoslavia, now in North Macedonia. He has worked as an essayist and editor besides being a poet and is an international coordinator for Lyrikline, Haus für Poesie, Berlin. He won the Studentski Zbor award for best debut in Macedonia and subsequently the DJS award for contribution to international poetry in China.

== Reception ==
Oliver Lake, a jazz composer who has collaborated with Björk and Lou Reed, has created compositions based on Madžirov's poems. His book Remnants of Another Age, with a foreword by poet Carolyn Forché, has been translated into English, and published in German as Versetzter Stein.

== Books ==
- Locked in the City (1999)
- Somewhere Nowhere (1999)
- Relocated Stone (2007)
- Remnants of Another Age (Bloodaxe Books, 2013)

== Awards ==
- Studentski Zbor Award (for Best Debut book)(1999)
- Aco Karamanov Award (1999)
- Hubert Burda European Poetry Award (2007)
- Brothers Miladinov Award (2007)
- Fifteen Martyrs of Tiveriopol Award (2007)
