= Slavcho Koviloski =

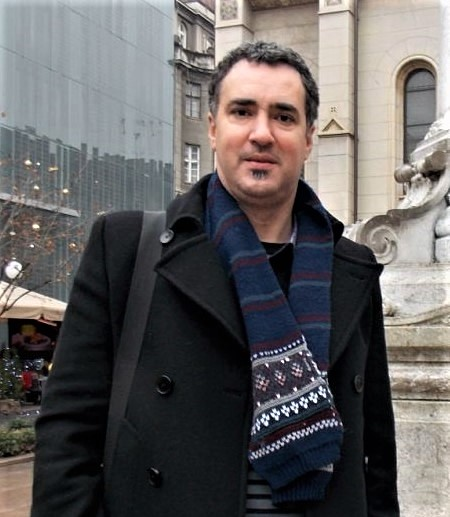
S.Koviloski u Zagrebu, 2018

Slavcho Koviloski also spelled as Slavčo (Macedonian Cyrillic: Славчо Ковилоски) (Skopje, 1978) is a Macedonian literary historian and culturologist.

== Biography ==
He is the author of several monographs on history, culturology and literature. He has won several prestigious awards, including the national award “Goce Delchev”, “3rd November Award” for science and “Grigor Prlichev” for poem. He was the Chief Editor of the oldest Macedonian magazine for literature, culture and art “Sovremenost” and “Stozer” revue published by the Macedonian Writers' Association. Koviloski is the founder of the organization Hip Hop Macedonia.
