= Stefan Markovski =

Macedonian writer

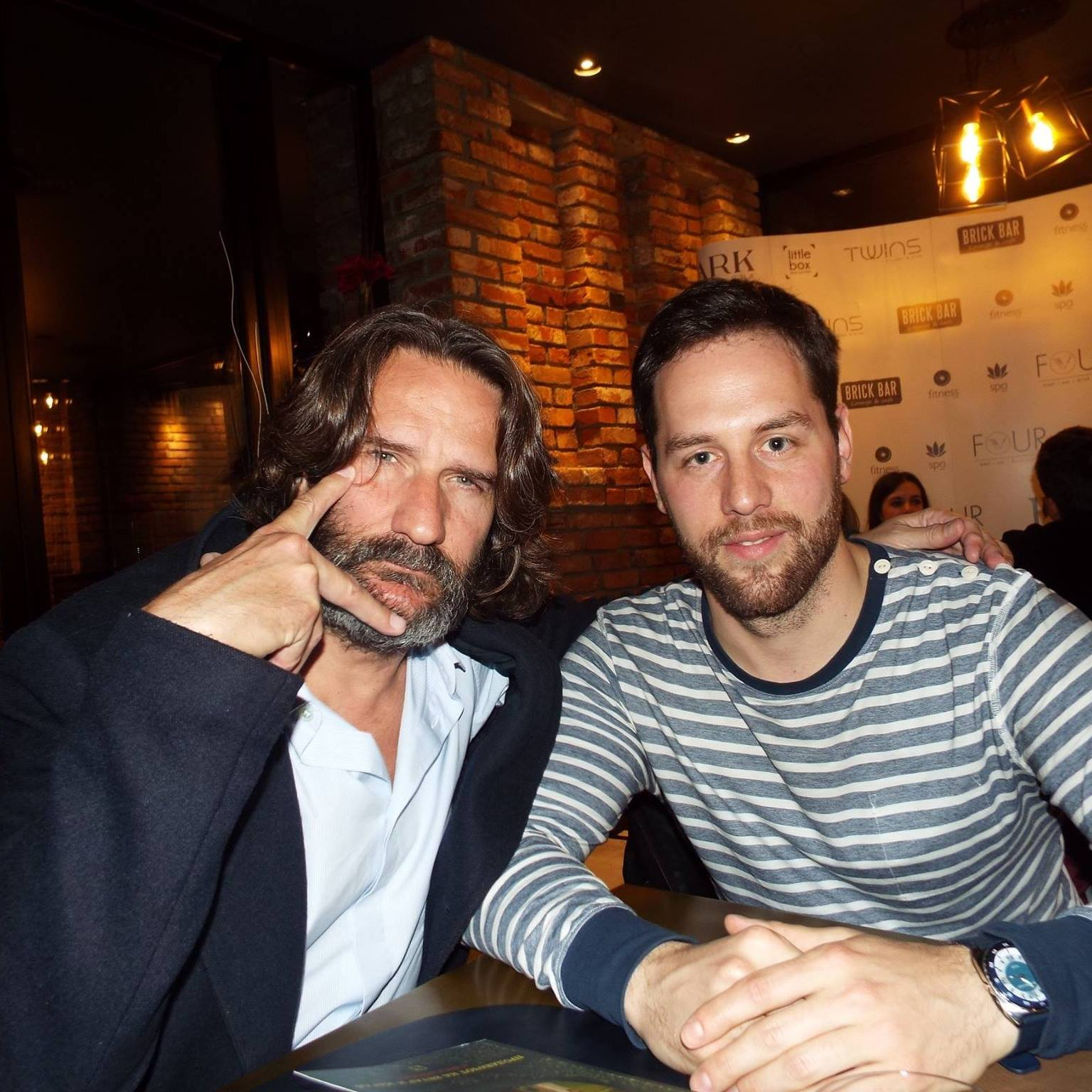
Stefan Markovski (right) with the French writer Frédéric Beigbeder

Stefan Markovski (Macedonian: Стефан Марковски) is a Macedonian writer, screenwriter, poet, philosopher and translator.

== Biography ==
Markovski was born in Gevgelija in 1990, where he finished his primary and secondary education. In 2009 he moved to Skopje, graduating on the Department of Comparative Literature and afterwards on the Institute of Philosophy at the State University in Skopje.

In 2018 he obtained an MA in Screenwriting at the Faculty of Dramatic Arts with the feature film script My Name Is Freedom. He is an editor-in-chief of the oldest Macedonian literary magazine, Sovremenost, and is also an editor of the review of the Association of Writers' of Macedonia "Stožer", as well as the poetry collections Metric caravan. Markovski is a member of the Macedonian Writers' Association, the European poetry platform "Versopolis", the Macedonian center of the International Theatre Institute and other international associations. Parts of Markovski's works have been published foreign languages.

His novels Letters of Heresy: Uncovering the Skies Shining in Red, The Bumblebee Anatomy, the short story collection Faustus Runs the Plebeian Circle, and the poetry collection Promised Land were published into English and made available on major bookselling platforms. His novel The Bumblebee Anatomy, published under the pen name Stemarcus, peaked at the number-one position in 2021 in the Eastern European Literature category. He lives and works in Gevgelija, serving as a director of the public library.

== Works and awards ==
Markovski's writing career begun in 2009 when his first novel One way (Еднонасочно) came out, winning the Petre M. Andreevski award. Throughout his career he's received awards for his contribution to the modern Macedonian literature, such as the "Knizeven krug" and “Macedonian Literary Avant-garde” for the short stories collections Faustus Runs the Plebeian Circle(Фауст го трча плебејскиот круг) and The Wind-and-Fog Seller and Other Stories (Продавачот на ветар и магла и други приказни), the “Beli Mugri” prize for his poetry book “Shy Shine the Universes” (Сиво сјаат вселените), “Krste Chachanski” for the short stories collection “Death Flies in Smirking” (Смртта долетува насмевната), The “7 November Award” of Municipality of Gevgelija, “Knjizevno pero” of the Croatian Writers’ Association (HKD) for book of the year, UNESCO and Makedonika award for Macedonian writers up to 30 years of age etc. In June 2021, Markovski was named International Poet of the Week by the British literary journal The Poet Magazine.

== Bibliography ==
=== Prose ===
==== Novels ====
One way, Fondacija Ramkovski, Skopje, 2009.
Letters of Heresy, Tri, Skopje, 2018.
The Bumblebee Anatomy, Pablisher, 2021.

==== Short stories ====
The wind-and-fog seller and other stories, Biblioteka Goce Delchev, Gevgelija, 2015.
Death flies in smirking, Bran, Struga, 2017.
Faustus runs the plebeian circle, BKK, Bitola, 2020.

=== Poetry ===
Apeiron, Geneks, Kocani, 2010.
Some memories from an eerie past, Geneks, Kocani, 2010.
In Nomine, Makedonska Rec, Skopje, 2016.
Shy Shine the Universes, Dom na kultura Koco Racin, Skopje, 2016.
Going after the White Griffin, Antolog, Skopje, 2018.
Hypergod, Prosvetno delo, Skopje, 2019.
Algorithmea, Polica, Skopje, 2022.
The Light in our Veins, Sovremenost, Skopje, 2024.

=== Theatre plays ===
The Mirror Masters, Sovremenost, Skopje, 2019.

=== Philosophy books ===
Hierarchical Evolution of Consciousness, Akademski pecat, Skopje, 2012.
Meta(de)construction and General Philosophy, Akademski pecat, Skopje, 2012.
Happiness is a Verb, Akademski pecat, Skopje, 2013.
Happiness is a Verb: Second edition, Akademska misla, Skopje, 2023.

=== Literary theory ===
"The Potentials of the Crime-Drama Genre Through the Feature Film Script My name is Freedom" (A Master Thesis), Biblioteka Goce Delchev, Gevgelija, 2019.
