= Meto Jovanovski (writer) =

Macedonian writer

- Born: 18 October 1928; Brajčino, Kingdom of Serbs, Croats and Slovenes. Officially the Kingdom of Yugoslavia (as of 1929), now part of (present-day) North Macedonia
- Died: 23 December 2016 (aged 88)
- Occupation: Author

Meto Jovanovski (Macedonian: Мето Јовановски; 18 October 1928 – 23 December 2016) was a Macedonian writer from the village of Brajčino in the Kingdom of Serbs, Croats, and Slovenes. In 1929 the Kingdom of Yugoslavia, now part of North Macedonia.

== Biography ==
He attended the teacher's college in Skopje and taught school for a few years before moving into the publishing industry. His first short stories were published in 1951, and his first short story collection appeared in 1956.

He worked as an editor of the literary magazines "Sovremenost" and "Horizon".

He is a former head of the Helsinki Committee for Human Rights of the Republic of North Macedonia.

== Bibliography ==
=== Short Stories Collections ===
- „Јадреш“, 1956
- „Мени на мојата месечина“, 1959
- „Првите човекови умирања“, 1971
- „Патот до осамата“, 1978
- „Крстопат кон спокојот“, 1987
- „Љубовта на Грифонот“, 2005.

=== Novels ===
- „Хајка на пеперутки“, 1957
- „Слана во цутот на бадемите“, 1965
- „Земја и тегоба“, 1968
- „Сведоци“, 1970
- „Будалетинки“, 1973
- „Орловата долина“, 1979
- „Крлежи“, 1984 и
- „Балканска книга на умрените или Ослободување преку зборување“, 1992.

=== Books for Children ===
- „Љуман Арамијата“, 1954 и
- „Војвода над војводите“, 1980.

Some of his works have been translated into English, including the novel Budaletinki (Будалетинки, or Simpletons in English) (1973) (published in English as Cousins), and Faceless Men, and Other Macedonian Stories (1992).
