= Aco Šopov =

Macedonian poet

Aco Sopov Aco Šopov Ацо Шопов
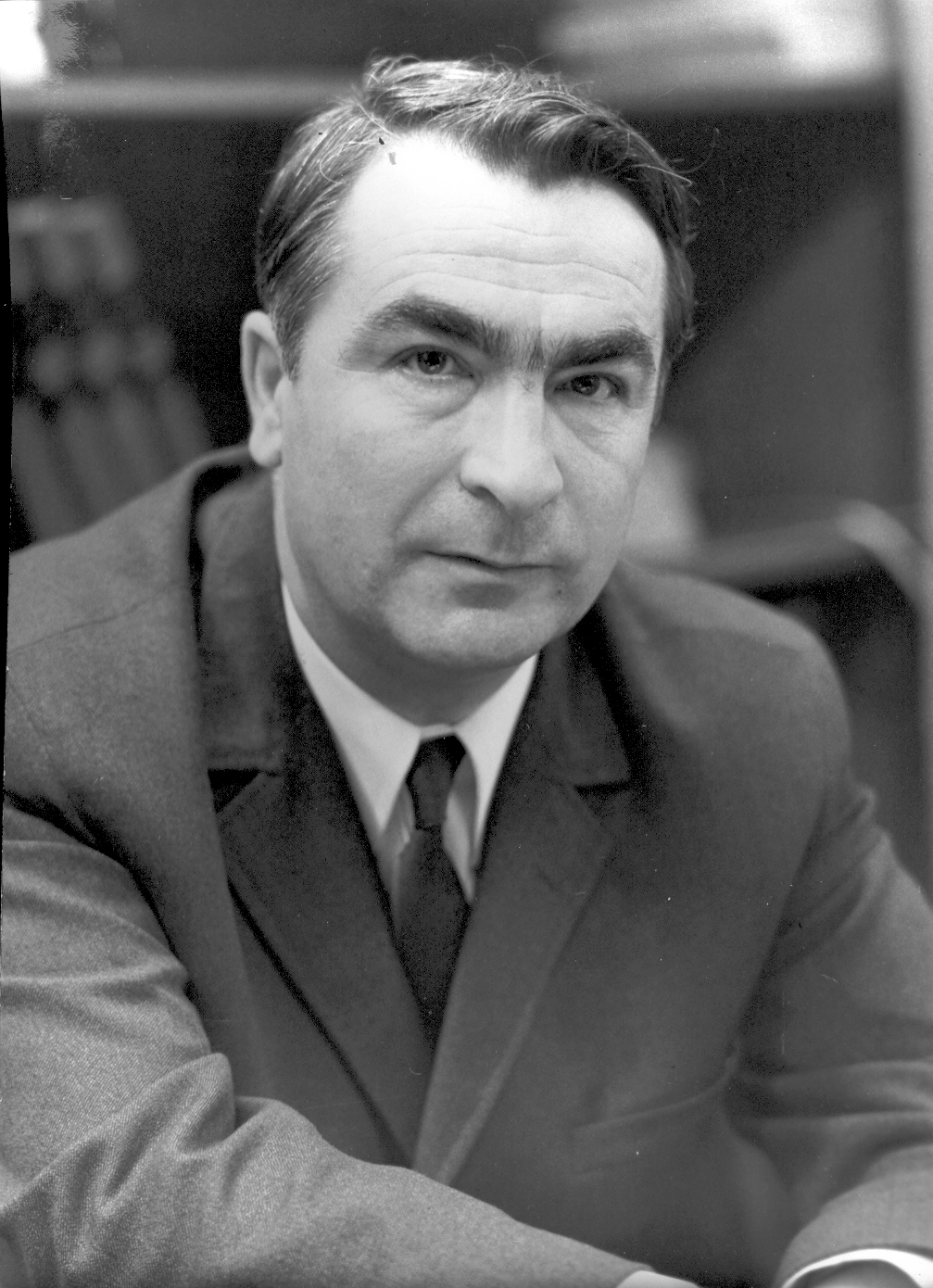
- A portrait of Aco Šopov
- Born: Александар Шопов; December 20, 1923; Štip, Kingdom of Yugoslavia
- Died: April 20, 1982; Skopje, SFR Yugoslavia
- Occupations: poet, translator, editor, diplomat
- Spouse: Svetlana Šopova
- Writing career
- Genre: Southeastern Europe contemporary poetry

Aco Šopov (Macedonian: Ацо Шопов [ˈat͡sɔ ˈʃɔpɔf]; 1923 – 1982) was a Macedonian poet. He was considered one of the most important poets of Yugoslavia. He took part in World War II in Yugoslavia (1941–45) and his poems written at the time were published as Pesni (Poems) in Belgrade and Kumanovo in 1944, and in Štip the following year. Pesni was the first poetry collection published in Macedonian in SR Macedonia after the war.

Šopov was member of the Macedonian Academy of Sciences and Arts (1967) and corresponding member of the Serbian Academy of Sciences and Arts (1968).

He graduated from the philosophy department of the Ss. Cyril and Methodius University of Skopje and the Higher Political School in Belgrade. He was president of the Translators’ Union and the Writers’ Union of the Socialist Republic of Macedonia in the 1950s and 1960s, and of the Writers’ Union of Yugoslavia from 1965 to 1969. From 1970 to 1977 he was a diplomat.

== Biography ==
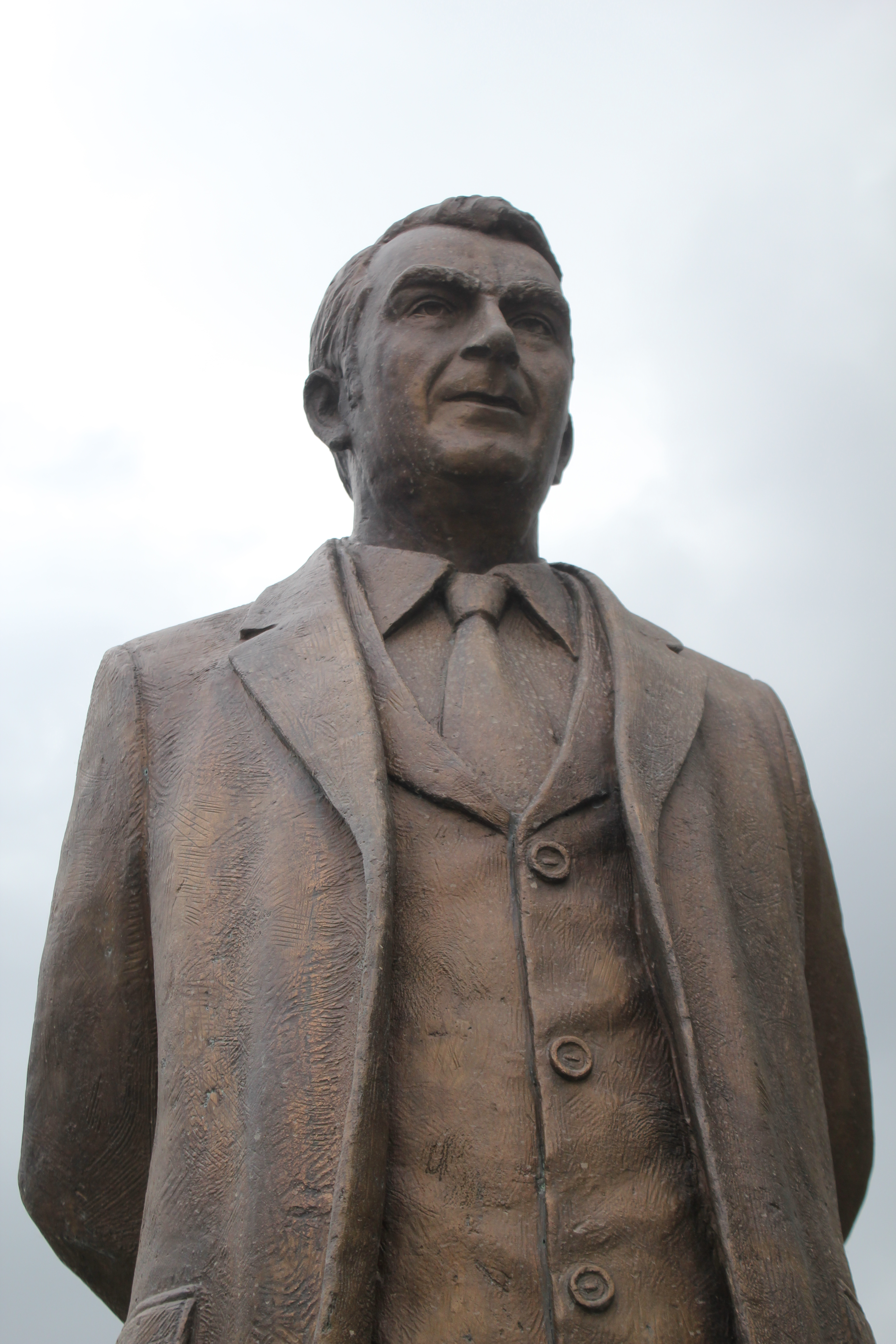
Monument of Aco Šopov on the Art Bridge, Skopje, Republic of Macedonia

His childhood was haunted by the specter of incurable disease, death, sadness, and loneliness - themes that would later permeate his poetry. He referred to his youth as the "Hundred-headed monster." When he was just eleven years old, his mother, whom he had cared for alone, died prematurely of a serious illness. He began writing poetry in a school notebook at the age of fourteen.

In 1943, at the age of 19, Aco Šopov became engaged in the Yugoslav Partisans' resistance to the Nazi occupying forces. He continued writing poetry during this period and found his subject matter in his own experience. He proved to be a highly personal poet even when chronicling events of a social or patriotic nature, as when describing the death of a much-loved woman and fellow partisan, Vera Jocić.

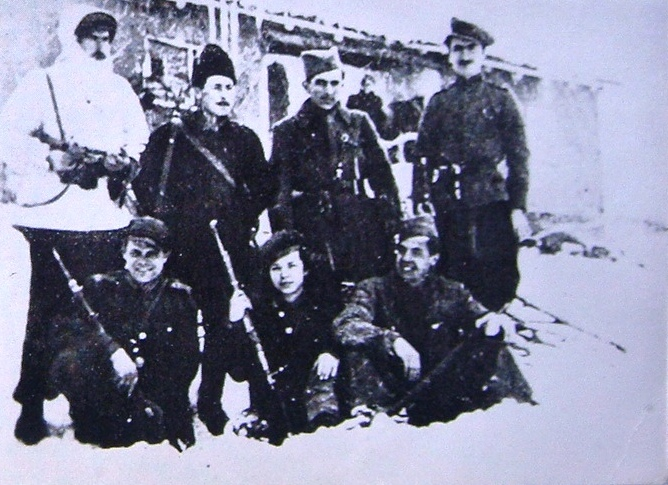
Aco Šopov (standing first from right) alongside Vera Jocić (down row in the middle) and Hristijan Todorovski Karpoš (standing second from right) in December 1943.

With his poetry book Stihovi na makata i radosta (Verses of Suffering and Joy), Šopov moved away from socialist realism. Because of this departure in the early 1950s, Šopov's poetry was initially criticized but came to be recognized several years later.

Speaking with his own voice, Šopov charted his own course in poetry, without being a dissident. "The greatest challenge and the greatest moral responsibility of the poet," he said in an interview, "is to find the right words to the contents and ideas he wants to express in an authentic and inimitable way. If it fails, the poem is pulled out of its socket, the word becomes a lie."

He was an editor of the literary magazine "Sovremenost".

In 1967, Aco Šopov became one of the founding members of the Macedonian Academy of Sciences and Arts, and was awarded with the AVNOJ in 1970. The AVNOJ Prize is the highest recognition in the area of science and art in the frames of the former Yugoslavia.

== Public career ==
In 1971, after many years of journalism and publishing, Aco Šopov was nominated as the Yugoslav Ambassador to Senegal. Šopov's time in Senegal inspired the book Poem for the black women, which won the Miladinov Brothers Prize at the Struga Poetry Evenings in 1976. This international festival, held each year in the South of Macedonia, was founded in 1961 by Šopov himself with a group of Macedonian poets.

In 1975, back from Senegal, Aco Šopov was appointed as President of the Commission for Cultural Relations with Foreign Countries of the Republic of Macedonia. However, just three years later, the disease foreshadowed in his poems forced him to retire from active life. Following a long illness, he died on 20 April 1982 in Skopje.

== Bibliography ==
=== Aco Šopov's Poetry Collections in English ===
- The Word’s Nativity. Edited by Katica Ḱulavkova. Skopje: St. Clement of Ohrid National and University Library, 2011. 196 p.
- The Long Coming of the Fire: Selected Poems. Compiled by Jasmina Šopova. Translated from the Macedonian by Rawley Grau and Christina E. Kramer. Dallas, Texas: Deep Vellum/Phoneme Media, 2023. 254 p. Bilingual edition.

=== Aco Šopov's poems in various anthologies in English ===
- An Anthology of Modern Yugoslav Poetry in English Translations / Janko Lavrin.- London: John Calder, 1962.
- A texte-Book of the Macedonian Language / Krum Tošev and Dragi Stefanija.- Skopje : Matica na iselenicite od Makedonija, 1965.- 185 p.
- Reflexions of pain and Unsubmissiveness : Selection of Macedonian Poetry from the Early Beginnings to Our Day.- Skopje, 1972
- Introduction to Yugoslav Literatur : an Anthology of Fiction and Poetry / ed. by Branko Mikasinovich, Dragan Milivojevich and Vasa D. Mihailovich.- New York: Twayne, 1973.- 647 p.
- Contemporary Yugoslav Poetry / Vasa D. Mihailovich.- Iowa City : University of Iowa Press, 1977.
- Reading the Ashes : an Anthology of the Poetry of Modern Macedonia/ Milne Holton, Graham W. Reid.- Pitsburg : University of Pitsburg Press, 1977.
- Evenings of Macedonian Poetry : Days of Macedonian Culture.- Skopje : Republic Commission for Cultural Relations of the Socialist Republic of Macedonia, 1979.- [68] p.
- White stones and fire trees : an Anthology of Contemporary Slavic Literature / Vasa D. Mihajlovich.- London: Associated University Presses, 1977.
- To Struga with love / Stanley H. Barkan.- Merrick – New York: Cross cultural Communications, 1978.
- Longing for the South : an Anthology of Contemporary Macedonian Poetry / Sitakant Mahapatra, Jozo T. Boškovski.- New Delhi : A. K. Dash, Prachi Prakasan, 1981.
- Macedonian Poetry / transl. N. Kuhner, G. Reid.- Aligarh – India : Editor Baldev Mirza, 1983.

=== Aco Šopov's Poetry Collections in Macedonian (originals) ===
- Pesni (Poems). Okoliski NOMSM. 1994.
- Pruga na mladosta (Railways of Youth)(with Slavko Janevski). Skopje. Main Board of the People’s Youth Force of Macedonia.1946.
- Na Gramos (On Gramos). Skopje: NAPOK. 1950.
- So naši race (With Our Hands). Skopje: State Book Publisher of Macedonia. 1950.
- Stihovi na makata i radosta (Verses of Suffering and Joy). Skopje. Kočo Racin. 1952.
- Slej se so tišinata (Merge with Silence). Skopje: Kočo Racin. 1955.
- Vetrot nosi ubavo vreme (Winds Bring Nice Weather). Skopje: Kočo Racin. 1957.
- Nebidnina (Nonbeing). Skopje: Kočo Racin. 1963.
- Ragjanje na zborot (The Word’s Nativity). Skopje: Misla. 1966.
- Jus-univerzum (Yus-Universum). Skopje: Misla. 1968.
- Gledač vo pepelta (Reading the Ashes). Skopje: Makedonska Kniga. 1970.
- Pesna za crnata žena (Song for the Black Woman). Skopje: Misla. 1976.
- Drvo na ridot (A Tree on a Bare Hill). Skopje. Misla. 1980.

=== Aco Šopov’s Poetry Selections in Macedonian ===
- Pesni (Poems). Skopje: Kočo Racin. 1963.
- Pesni (Poems). Skopje: Makedonska kniga & Detska radost. 1967.
- Izbor (Selection). Edited by Georgi Stardelov. Skopje: Makedonska kniga. 1968.
- Zlaten krug na vremeto (Golden Circle of Time). Skopje: Misla. 1969.
- Odbrani dela (Selected Works). Edited by Slobodan Micković. Skopje: Misla. 1976.
- Okeanot e mal, čovekot e golem (The Ocean is Small, the Man is Vast). Edited by Georgi Stardelov. Skopje: Centar za kultura i informacii. 1977.
- Luzna (Scar). Skopje: Misla (Foreword to Eftim Kletnikov).1981.
- Izbor od poezijata (Poetry Selection) Edited by Rade Siljan. Skopje, Makedonska kniga, 1987.
- Pesni (Poems). Edited by Rade Siljan. Skopje: Združeni izdavači. 1988.
- Nebo na tišinata (Sky of Silence). Edited by Vele Smilevski. Skopje: Kultura. 1990.
- Gledač vo pepelta (Reader of Ashes). Edited by Georgi Stardelov. Skopje: Misla. 1991.
- Dolgo doagjanje na ognot (The Long Arrival of the Fire). Edited by Svetlana Šopova. Skopje: Liber-M.1993.
- Poezija (Poetry) Aco Šopov’s poetry selection. Edited by Katica Kulavkova. Skopje: Makedonska Kniga. 1993.
- Rađanjeto na zborot (The Word’s Nativity). Edited by Katica Kulavkova. Bitola: NID MIKENA, 2008.

=== Aco Šopov’s Poetry Selections in other languages ===
- Zlij se s tišino. Prepev Ivan Minati. Ljubljana : Državna založba Slovenije, 1957. 72 p.
- Örök várakozó. Foditotta: Fehér Ferenc, Novi Sad, Forum, 1964. 78 p.
- Ветер приносить погожие дни. Перевод Александар Романенко. Москва: Прогресс, 1964. 64 p.
- Предвечерје. Избор, превод и препјев Сретен Перовиć. Титоград: Графички завод, 1966. 115 p.
- Ugnus-milestiba: dzeja. Sakartojis Aleksandar Romanenko. Riga: Liesma, 1974. 103 p.
- Песме. Избор и предговор Георги Старделов; превод и препјев Сретен Перовић, Београд: Народна књига, 1974. 277 p.
- Pjesma crne žene. Prevela Elina Elimova, Zagreb, August Cesarec, 1977. 39 p.
- Дуго долаженје огња: изaбране песме. Превод Сретен Перовић, Београд: Рад, 1977. 105 p.
- En chasse de ma voix. Choix et adaptation Djurdja Sinko-Depierris, Jean-Louis Depierris, Paris, Editions Saint-Germains-des-Prés, 1978. 60 p.
- Naşterea cuvéntului. Selectiesi traducere de Ion Deaconesvu; prefatâ si note Traian Nica. Cluj-Napoca: Dacia, 1981, 91 p.
- Lector de cenizas. Presentación selectión i traucción por Aurora Marya Saavedra. Mèhico: Cuadernos Cara a Cara, 1987, 93 p.
- Шопов во светот, Шопов од светот. Избор и предговор Милош Линдро. Скопје: Македонска книга, 1994 (Избор, кн. 2).
- Anthologie Personnelle. Poésie traduite du macédonien par Jasmina Šopova; introduction d’Ante Popovski; adaptation et postface d’Edouard Maunick. Paris: Actes Sud / Editions UNESCO, 1994, 143 p.
- Stigmate. Edité par Jasmina Šopova. Skopje : Matica makedonska, 2001. 253 p. (macédonien et français)
- Senghor-Šopov : Parallèles. Edité par Jasmina Šopova; Introductions: Jasmina Šopova, Hamidou Sall, Risto Lazarov. Illustrations: Hristijan Sanev. Skopje: Sigmapres, 2006. 206 p. (français et macédonien).
- Sol negro. Traducción de Luisa Futoransky. Prólogo y selección por Jasmina Šopova. Buenos Aires : Leviatán, 2011. 98 p.
- Geburt des Wortes = Naissance de la parole. Gedichte übersetzt aus dem Makedonischen von Ina Jun Broda; Traduit du macédonien par Jasmina Šopova et Edouard J.Maunick. Struga: Sruga Poesieabende / Soirées poétiques de Struga, 2010. 92 p.
- Soleil noir = Schwarze Sonne. Préface = Vorwort: Jasmina Šopova. Differdange: Editions PHI, 2012. 121 p.
- Раждание на словото. Подбор, превод, предговор: Роман Кисьов; Русе: Авангард принт, 2013. 110 p.
- Z najstarszego i najczystszego światła słonecznego : wiersze = Од најстара и најчиста сончевина : песни / Aco Szopow [przełożył i wstępem opatrzył Maciej Kawka].- Kraków : Towarzystwo Autorów i Wydawców Prac Naukowych Universitas, 2023.- 248, [3] strony; 21 cm.
- Aco Šopov: a universal poet [selection of Šopov's poetry translated into Arabic by Jamila Mejri], Tunis, 2023..
- Дрво на брегу / Ацо Шопов ; [приредила, уредила и превела са македонског језика Данијела Д. Костадиновић].- Ниш : Друштво књижевника и књижевних преводилаца Ниша, 2024 (Ниш : Наис принт).- 54 стр. : илустр. ; 18 cm.
- Златен круг на времето = Zlati krog časa : izbor pesmi ob stoletnici rojstva Aca Šopova in izbor likovnih del Bogeta Dimovskega ob petdesetletnici umetniškega ustvarjanja / [pesmi] Aco Šopov in [likovna dela] Boge Dimovski ; [avtorji spremnih besedil Namita Subiotto in Milček Komelj ; izbrala in uredila Domen Dimovski in Namita Subiotto ; prevajalci Sonja Cekova Stojanoska ... [et al.] ; fotografije Domen Dimovski].- Ljubljana : Zveza MKD v Republiki Sloveniji, 2024 (Bitola : Grafo prom).- 233 str. : ilustr. ; 22 x 23 cm

=== Translations in Macedonian by Aco Šopov ===
- Eduard Bagricki, Pesna za Apanasa, translated by Šopov and Slavko Janevski. 1951.
- Oton Zupančič, Ciciban. 1951.
- I. A. Krilov, Basani. 1953.
- Gustav Krklec, Telegrafski basni. 1954.
- Jovan Jovanović Zmaj, Pesni. 1954.
- Pierre Corneille, Le Cid. 1958.
- Grigor Vitez, Pesna na čučuligata. 1959.
- William Shakespeare, Hamlet. 1960.
- Miroslav Krleža, Pesni/Izbor. 1963.
- Izet Sarajlić, Poezija. 1965.
- Dragutin Tadijanović, Večer nad gradot. 1966.
- William Shakespeare, Sonnets. 1970.

== Books on Aco Šopov ==
- Aco Šopov (1923–1982): Festschrift presented as a memorial to Aco Šopov : a member of Macedonian Academy of Sciences and Arts.
- Ivanović Radomir: Poetikata na Aco Šopov, prevod od srpskohrvatski rakopis Milan Trajkov, Skopje, Makedonska revija, 1986.
- Ivanović Radomir: Reč o reči : poetika Ace Šopova, Beograd, Novo Delo, 1986.
- Tvoreštvoto na Aco Šopov (simpozium po povod 70-godišninata od rađanjeto na Aco Šopov), Skopje, Filološki fakultet, Institut za makedonska literatura, 1993.
- Kitanov Blaže: Aco Šopov, Život i delo, Skopje, Kultura, 1998.
- Stardelov Georgi, Nebidninata: poezijata i poetskoto iskustvo na Aco Šopov, Skopje, Matica makedonska, 2000.
- Aco Šopov: svečen sobir po povod 20-godišninata od smrtta na Aco Šopov, Skopje, 24.IV 2002 godina.
- Šopova Jasmina: Po-tragite na Aco Šopov, Skopje, Sigmapres, 2003.
- Životot i deloto na Aco Šopov (međunaroden naučen sobir po povod osumdesetgodišninata od rađanjeto na Aco Šopov), Skopje, Makedonska Akademija na naukite i umetnostite, 2005

Preceded by Matej Bor	President of the Association of Writers of Yugoslavia; 1968-1970	Succeeded by Ivo Frangeš
