= Tome Arsovski =

Tome Arsovski (23 September 1928 – 22 April 2007) was a Macedonian dramatist. He was born in Kosovska Mitrovica. He studied Slavistics at the Faculty of Philosophy in Skopje. Many of his works are set during World War II or in post-war Macedonia and explore the hardships facing the people, although some are more light-hearted in subject. His works such as The Paradox of Diogenes (1961), Hoops (1965) and A Step Into Autumn (1969) are described by The Columbia Encyclopedia of Modern Drama as being "characterized by strong social commitment and analysis of social anomalies and their effect on the fate of the individual". His The Paradox of Diogenes is a courtroom drama which "focuses sharply on the relationship between the individual and society".
