= Kole Nedelkovski =

Macedonian poet (1912–1941)

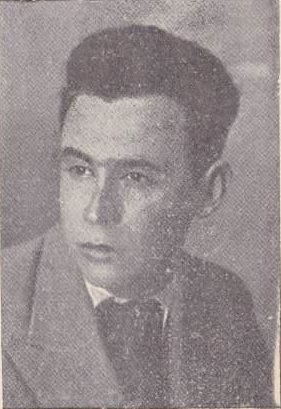
- A portrait of Kole Nedelkovski.
- Born: Nikola Krastev Nedelkov; December 16, 1912; Vojnica, Ottoman Empire
- Died: September 2, 1941 (aged 28); Sofia, Kingdom of Bulgaria
- Occupations: Poet and communist
- Writing career
- Genre: Revolutionary poetry
- Notable works: Mӑskavici and Peš po svetot

Kole Nedelkovski (Bulgarian and Macedonian: Коле Неделковски; December 16, 1912 – September 2, 1941) was a Macedonian poet. He was a member of the Macedonian Literary Circle and he published two poetry books. Nedelkovski is seen as one of the founders of the modern Macedonian literature.

== Biography ==
He was born on December 16, 1912, in Vojnica, near Veles, Ottoman Empire, as Nikola Krảstev Nedelkov. After completing his elementary education in his native village, he went to study at a gymnasium in Veles, but did not complete it due to poverty and started working as a decorator instead. Hunted by the Yugoslav police, he emigrated to Bulgaria in 1933, where he became a member of the Bulgarian Communist Party. He published poetry in the magazine Illustration Ilinden in 1938. In 1939, Nedelkovski joined the Macedonian Literary Circle. He was a friend of the poets Nikola Vaptsarov, Venko Markovski and Koco Racin. He participated in the anti-fascist movement. In 1941, he joined an illegal group of the Bulgarian Communist Party and came under police scrutiny. Nedelkovski died in Sofia on September 2, 1941. There are two versions about his death. One is that he ended his life, running from the police, by jumping from an attic window and the second one is that he was pushed and fell to his death. There is no official report about his death.

== Works and legacy ==
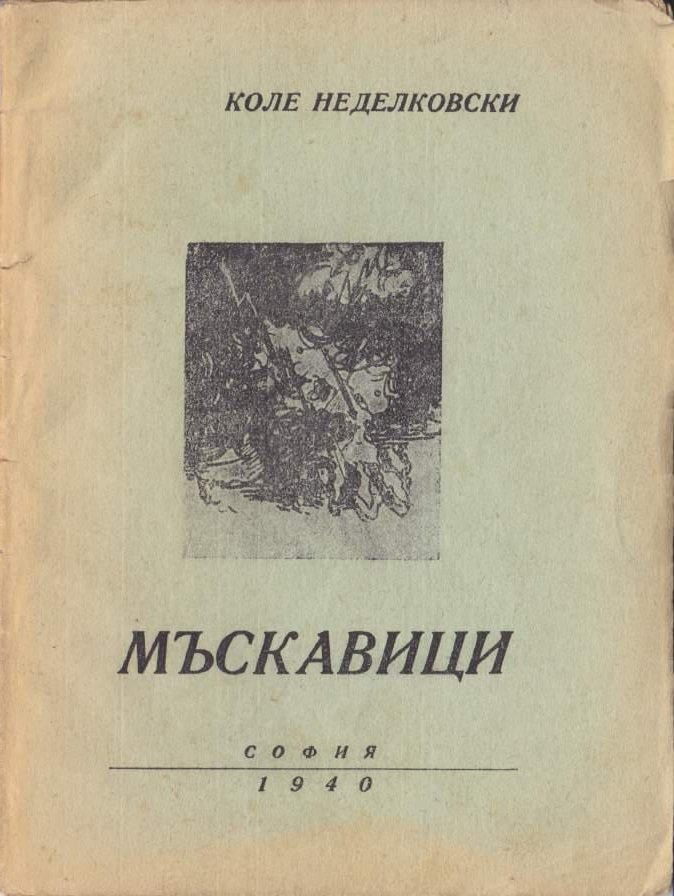
The cover of Lightnings

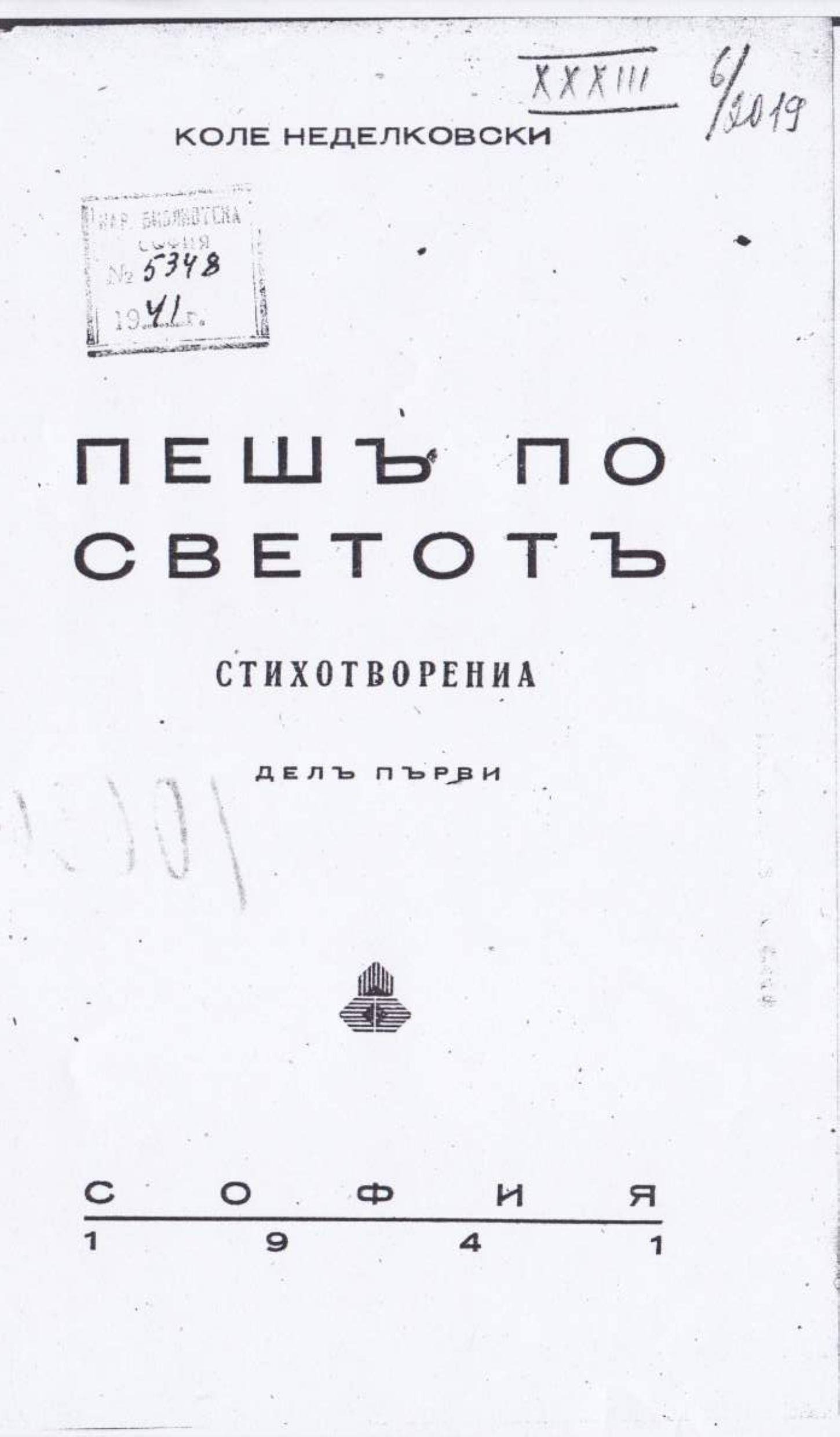
The cover of On Foot Around the World

He authored the poem "A Voice from Macedonia" (Glas od Makedonija). His poetry describes the difficult life of the Macedonian people prior to World War II and glorifies the communist ideas and fight against capitalism. Nedelkovski's poems were published in Sofia in older Bulgarian orthography in the Skopje-Veles dialect.

Nedelkovski published two poetry books:

- "Lightnings" (Молскавици/Molskavici, Мъскавици/Mӑskavici) - published in 1940.
- "On Foot Around the World" (Пеш по светот/Peš po svetot, Пешъ по Светотъ/Pesh po Svetot) - published in August 1941.

He is seen as a founder of modern Macedonian literature. His memorial house in Vojnica in North Macedonia was reported as being in a bad state in 2024.

== See also ==
- List of Macedonian writers
