= Veni =

Veni may refer to:

- Veni Creator Spiritus, a hymn normally sung in Gregorian Chant and is considered the "most famous of hymns"
- Veni Domine, Swedish Christian progressive doom metal band, founded 1987
- Veni Sancte Spiritus (sometimes called the "Golden Sequence"), a sequence prescribed for the Roman Catholic Mass of Pentecost
- Veni, veni, Emmanuel, a Latin hymn for Advent based on the O Antiphons
- Veni, Veni, Emmanuel (1992), a concerto for percussion and orchestra by James MacMillan based on the preceding hymn
- Veni, vidi, vici, a remark reportedly made by Julius Caesar, translated as "I came, I saw, I conquered"
- Veni Vidi Vicious, the title of a garage rock album by Swedish band The Hives
- Veni Markovski Bulgarian Internet pioneer.
