= Vasil Ivanovski =

Bulgarian politician (1906–1991)

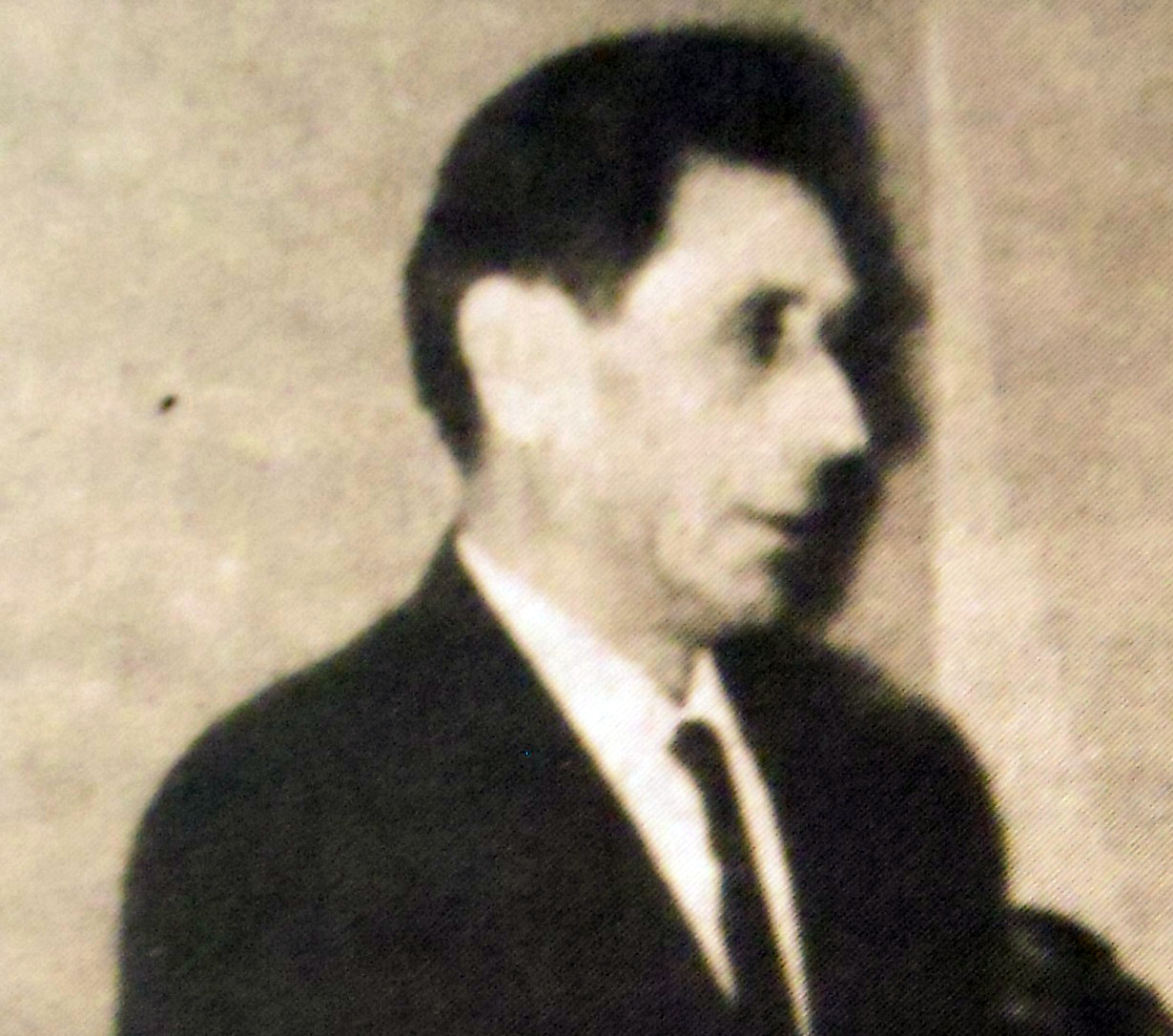
Ivanovski during the late 1940s.

Vasil Atanasov Ivanovski (Bulgarian: Васил Атанасов Ивановски; 18 October 1906, Golovrade – 1991, Sofia) also known by his pseudonym Bistrishki, was a Bulgarian Communist Party activist, publicist, theoretician of the Macedonian nation within the IMRO (United).

== Biography ==
The article Why we Macedonians are a separate nation was published on the Fourth Congress of the Macedonian People's League in Detroit in December 1934.

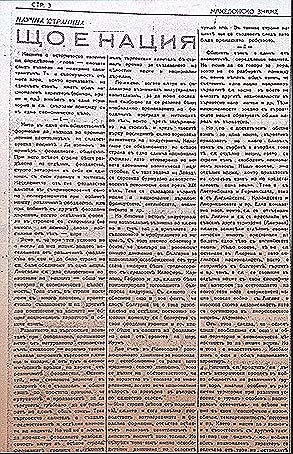
One of the articles written by Vasil Ivanovski in 1934, titled "What is a Nation"?

Ivanovski was born on October 18, 1906, in the former Kastorian village of Golovrade, then in the Ottoman Empire. Together with his family, Ivanovski emigrated to Bulgaria after WWI. He graduated from a high school in Plovdiv. Later Ivanovski was a tobacco worker, trade unionist and left-wing political activist, and since 1923 a member of the Bulgarian Communist Party (BCP). He took part in the September Uprising, that aimed for the "establishment of a government of workers and peasants" in Bulgaria. In 1926 he emigrated to the USSR (Odessa and Tbilisi). In September 1927 he was sent to study at the Communist University of the National Minorities of the West in Moscow, graduating in 1932. In the early 1930s he became close to several Yugoslav communists from Vardar Macedonia, as Malina Popivanova, who influenced him to accept the idea that the Macedonian Slavs were not Macedonian Bulgarians, but a separate nation. Ivanovski returned to Bulgaria in 1933, when he became a member of the IMRO (United). At that time, members of the Comintern sponsored IMRO (United), put for the first time the issue of the recognition of a separate Macedonian nation.

In 1934 Ivanovski wrote an article under the name "Why we Macedonians are a separate nation" in the spirit of Stalin's theory of the nation he argued for the existence of a Macedonian nation and a Macedonian language. There Ivanovski declared many historical figures, including such from the Middle Ages, as ethnic Macedonians. His article caused shock among the Bulgarian public and even among some members of the BCP and the IMRO (united). Per him the Macedonian revivalists considered themselves subjectively as Bulgarians, but objectively, their activity followed an agenda of a creation of a distinct Macedonian nation. Within an extramural discussion in the press with some Bulgarian historians Ivanovski accused them of being “bourgeois". At the political trial in Sofia against IMRO (United) members in 1936, he was sentenced to 5 years in prison, but his sentence was reduced and he was released in 1939. During this period he was member of the Macedonian literary circle in Sofia. In 1941 he went underground and in 1942 he was arrested and sentenced to 15 years in prison. From 1943 he served his sentence in Idrizovo, Skopje region, then in Bulgaria. In prison, Ivanovski created his major work called The Macedonian Question in the Past and Today, which is an attempt to present "the history of the Macedonian people" from antiquity to the present through the prism of Marxist philosophy. With this work, he became the founder of the modern Macedonian historiography.

The Macedonian Question in the Past and Today written during his stay in Idrizovo.

On June 20, 1944, he managed to escape from the Idrizovo prison and joined the Macedonian Partisans. He participated at the First Meeting of ASNOM. When the Nova Makedonija newspaper was founded, Ivanovski was elected its first editor-in-chief. He was also Deputy Minister of Social Welfare in the newly created SR Macedonia. In his 1944 work “On Unifying the Macedonian People”, Ivanovski presented the idea that ASNOM's legislative decisions set the foundations of the first Macedonian State since the medieval state of Tsar Samuil. The ASNOM formed a committee to standardize a literary Macedonian language and Macedonian alphabet, where he participated. In 1945 he opposed the pro-Serbian and anti-Bulgarian policy of Lazar Koliševski. He accuses Kolishevski, who tried to convince his comrades that the convening of ASNOM on August 2, 1944, was wrongly related with the Ilinden Uprising, which was a Bulgarian conspiracy and declared the IMRO revolutionary Gotse Delchev a "Bulgarian irrelevant to Macedonia." In a letter to the leader of the Bulgarian communists Georgi Dimitrov Ivanovski announced the de-Bulgarization by the codification of the new alphabet and the new literary language and expressed his concern at the violent methods used to create the new Macedonian nation.

At the end of 1945 fully disappointed by the Yugoslav communists he returned to Bulgaria and worked in Pirin Macedonia. There Ivanovski became an active participant in the state policy of Macedonianization of the local population. He became head of the agitation and propaganda department at the Central Committee of the Bulgarian Communist Party and chairman of the Central Macedonian Initiative Committee. For a period of some years then the Yugoslav and Bulgarian Communist leaders worked on a project to merge their two countries into a Balkan Communist Federation and to merge Bulgarian and Yugoslav Macedonia to a United Macedonia. After the split between Tito and Stalin in 1948, a gradual change of that policy came in Bulgaria. In 1949 Ivanovski was dismissed from the Central Committee and expelled from the Party and subsequently arrested by the Bulgarian authorities. During the political trial against Traycho Kostov, he was accused of being a spy for Tito. Ivanovski was sentenced to 12 years of imprisonment and loss of civil rights for 15 years. After seven years in prison, in 1956 he was rehabilitated and released. After his release in 1958 at a plenum of the Bulgarian Communist Party the decision was taken that the Macedonian nation and language did not exist. Later Ivanovski lived in isolation in Sofia where he died in 1991.

== Legacy ==
According to the Macedonian historiography, Ivanovski is its founder and a prominent "fighter for the affirmation of the Macedonian national identity", and according to the Bulgarian historiography, he is known "for his wanderings on the Macedonian question". Per the Macedonian historian Ivan Katardžiev, such activists of the IMRO (United) and the Bulgarian Communist Party never managed to break with their pro-Bulgarian aspirations.

== See also ==
- Historiography in North Macedonia
- Macedonian literary circle
