= Macedonian Literary Circle =

Literary society (1938–1941)

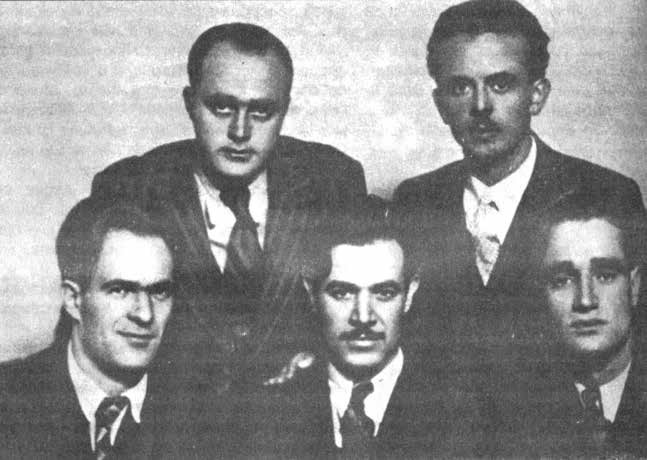
Members of the circle (from left to right): Nikola Vaptsarov, Todor Yanev, Mihail Smatrakalev, Kiril Nikolov and Anton Popov in 1940.

The Macedonian Literary Circle (1938–1941; Bulgarian: Македонски литературен кръжок; Macedonian: Македонски литературен кружок, romanized: Makedonski literaturen kružok) was a literary society created in Sofia, Bulgaria, in 1938 by young and educated members of the Macedonian immigrant community, who were leftists.

== History ==
The circle was established on the encouragement of the Bulgarian Communist Party. It attempted to create a purely Macedonian literature, assembling poets, writers and journalists associated with the Bulgarian Communist Party and formerly with the IMRO (United). These intellectuals argued for a distinct Macedonian nation and development of a Macedonian literary language. Though, their by-laws and statutes were in Bulgarian.

Most active from its members were: Nikola Vaptsarov, Venko Markovski, Kole Nedelkovski, Vasil Ivanovski, Gjorgi Abadžiev, Anton Popov, Mihail Smatrakalev, Dimitar Mitrev and others. The driving force was Vaptsarov, who asserted that their task was to make the world realize that Macedonians are a separate nation and people with their own distinctive features from other South Slavs. Many members were only able to write in Bulgarian. Kole Nedelkovski and Venko Markovski who were by origin from Vardar Macedonia, then in Kingdom of Yugoslavia, wrote in the Macedonian dialects. The members maintained relations with their Vardar Macedonian counterparts and admired the Macedonian poetry of Kočo Racin, as well as the efforts of Krste Misirkov, the ideologist of Macedonian nationalism, whose tasks they took upon themselves. In 1941, the members of the Macedonian Literary Circle published their works in the newspaper Literary Critic, with editor-in-chief Nikola Vaptsarov, and this was the last place of their literary appearances. The circle disbanded itself in the spring of 1941, when most of Macedonia came under Bulgarian occupation, and its attempts to awaken Macedonian identity were abandoned.

== Legacy ==
Some former members became founders of the Association of Writers of Macedonia, the Ss. Cyril and Methodius University of Skopje, and the Macedonian Academy of Sciences and Arts after World War II. However, Venko Markovski, credited with having published the first book in the Macedonian dialect while living in Sofia before the war, and afterwards with having codified the new Macedonian alphabet, switched his national affiliation back to Bulgarian and viewed Macedonian identity as a form of Bulgarian regionalism.

The Macedonian Literary Circle is acclaimed by the Macedonian historiography as the most significant Macedonian cultural-literary and national-political association in the interwar period, and a successor of the Macedonian Scientific and Literary Society.

According to the Bulgarian journal Makedonski Pregled, the reason for the circle's dissolvement in the Spring of 1941, was the euphoria that overwhelmed its participants, seeing in the Bulgarian invasion of Yugoslavia and Greece a form of Bulgarian national unification.

== See also ==
- Resolution of the Comintern on the Macedonian question (1934)
- Young Macedonian Literary Society
