= White Dawns =

Book by Kočo Racin

- The cover of the book "Beli Mugri"
- Author: Kočo Racin
- Original title: Бели мугри
- Language: Macedonian
- Publication date: 1939
- Pages: 31

White Dawns (Macedonian: Бели мугри, romanized: Beli mugri) is a collection of poems by the famous Macedonian poet Kočo Racin (Кочо Рацин), published in 1939 in Samobor, near Zagreb, Kingdom of Yugoslavia (present-day Croatia). It is the third collection of poems published in contemporary Macedonian language, after Venko Markovski's Folk Sorrows (Народни бигори) and The Fire (Огинот), published in 1938.

== Publication and content ==
White Dawns was printed on 25 November at the printing house of Dragutin Schpuler in 4,000 copies. After the established communist practice, the title is printed in red. Since there was a danger in discovering the author's identity, Kosta Solev published the work under the pseudonym "K. Racin" (К. Рацин). According to The Princeton Encyclopedia of Poetry and Poetics, the poetry collection explores the fate of impoverished Macedonians. The poems of the book were prohibited by the Yugoslav government. Per Preply, it is the most translated book from North Macedonia.

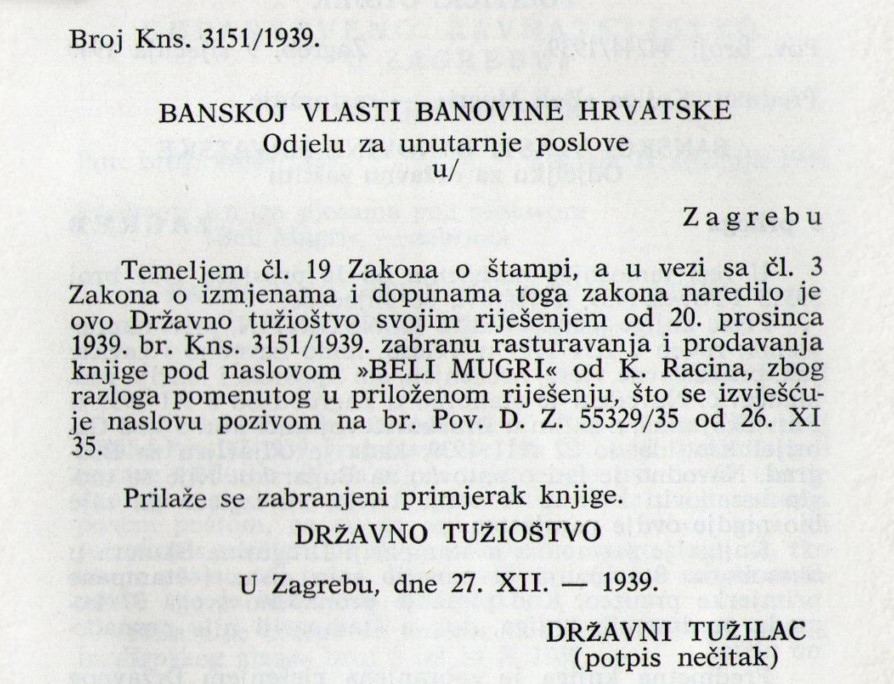
Government documents from the Banovina of Croatia banning the sale and manufacturing of White Dawns on December 27th, 1939.

White Dawns comprises 12 poems in the following order:

- Days (Денови)
- Sorrow (Печал)
- Rural toil (Селска мака)
- The tobacco harvesters (Тутуноберачите)
- Lenka (Ленка)
- Farewell (Проштавање)
- A ballad to the unknown one (Балада за непознатиот)
- Elegies for you (Елегии за тебе)
- The morning above us (Утрото над нас)
- Tatunčo (Татунчо)
- To have a shop in Struga (На Струга дуќан да имам)
- The diggers (Копачите)

== See also ==
- Socialist realism
- Macedonian literature
