= Skopje-Veles dialect =

Dialect of Macedonian

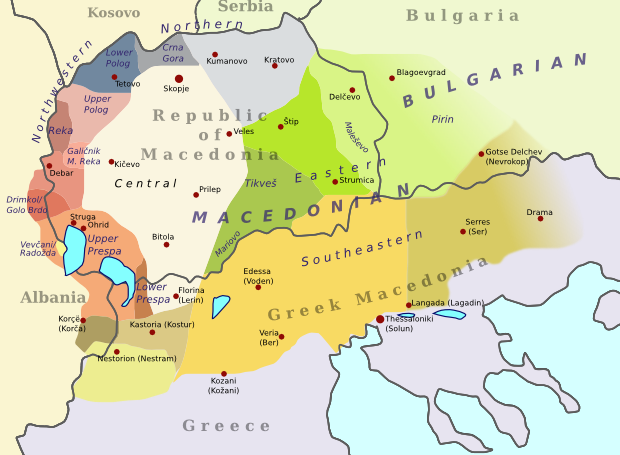
The location of the Skopje-Veles dialect among the others Macedonian dialects

Dialect samples
Tale of the Fate of the Rich Man and his Wife
Excerpt from speech by a man from Bardovci, Skopje region

The Shepherd and the Snake
Excerpt from a tale told by a man from Šiševo, Skopje region

The Skopje-Veles dialect (Macedonian: Скопско-велешки дијалект, Skopsko-veleški dijalekt) is a member of the central subgroup of the Western group of dialects of Macedonian. The dialect is spoken by a larger group of people in the cities Skopje and Veles and in the surrounding villages: Volkovo, Katlanovo, Petrovec and Čaška among others. This dialect is of historical importance for Macedonian because it is considered by many to be a prestige dialect. On August 2, 1945, the Skopje-Veles dialect, together with the other dialects of the central group was officially regulated as a basis of standard Macedonian. Many Macedonian writers and linguists were writing on this dialect and considered it to be standard Macedonian. One of them was Krste Petkov Misirkov and in his book For Macedonian affairs wrote that this dialect should be standard Macedonian. He has been writing on Skopje-Veles dialect and on Prilep-Bitola dialect.

Internal migration to the capital Skopje in the 1950s and 1960s led to the development of a new, urban slang where newly arrived people attempted to incorporate elements of the Skopje-Veles dialect into their own speech, often confusing local elements with those from Serbo-Croatian. Language contact with Serbo-Croatian, then a more prestigious language in SFR Yugoslavia, also reached its height during this period. This variety has been described as a "creolized form of Serbian" (cf. also Surzhyk in Ukraine, Trasianka in Belarus) and is distinct from the 'authentic' Skopje-Veles dialect.

== Phonological characteristics ==
- use of /v/ instead of the archaic /x/: страх (strah) > страв (strav; 'fear');
- emphasis mostly on the antepenultimate syllable in Veles, and less in Skopje;
- use of the hard (palatal) l;
- use of intervocal /v/: човек (čovek; 'man');
- use of the hard sound њ (nj) (in the other dialects of the central group this sound is soft);
- use of the letter ќ and ѓ (in the others dialects of the central group the cluster јќ and јѓ is found): куќа (kuḱa) – кујќа (kujḱa; 'house').

== Morphological characteristics ==
- use of the preposition во (vo) or в (v);
- use of the grammatical construction have + past participle: имам работено (imam raboteno; 'I have worked');
- use of three articles.

== Examples of the Skopje-Veles dialect ==
The poem "A voice from Macedonia" by Kole Nedelkovski is probably one of the most famous texts written in the Skopje-Veles dialect.

О, трајте, трајте, тирани недни!
Доста се тија лаги и злоба –
пакосен глас од устите гадни
над мојот народ у секоја доба.

Та ете веќ векови цели
писка и стенка од волци гости –
за брата вијат кој да го дели
за да му глода сувите коски.

Па нека сега сам да си реши
со своја волја судба и сева,
в животот еднаш сам да се теши,
д'издигне славно свој род без врева.

Та Шар и Пирин дружно да викнат
родната песна в небеса темни
и бурниот Егеј – на век да плиска
тешкиот глас на новите химни.

O, trajte, trajte, tirani nedni!
Dosta se tija lagi i zloba –
pakosten glas od ustite gadni
nad mojot narod u sekoja doba.

Ta ete veḱe vekovi celi
piska i stenka od volci gosti –
za brata vijat koj da go deri,
za da mu gloda suvite koski.

Pa neka sega sam da si reši
so svoja volja, sudba i seva,
v životot ednaš sam da se teši,
d' izdigne slavno svoj rod bez vreva.

Ta Šar i Pirin družno da viknat
rodnata pesna v nebesa temni
i burniot Egej — navek da pliska
teškiot glas na novite himni.

Skopje dialect

И кога о́тишол та́му, прет ку́ќата и́мало една‿ја́бука. И се‿ка́чил на ја́буката. И‿иско́чило ла́мн’ичето и ви́ка: „И, ма́мо, ка́коф сра́шен ју́нак има на ја́буката“. „Ка́ко ги‿ја́де, ќе́рко, ја́буките, а́ли со‿све‿ли́стот, а́ли ѓи‿о́дбира“? „Не‿ѓи‿о́дбира, не́“. „Е, не‿е сра́шен за‿на́с, ви́кни‿го‿ва́му“. Коа‿го‿ви́кнале та́му, и‿о́на ту́рила сла́ма да‿за́пали о́ѓин да‿му‿на́прави ве́чера, и му‿ви́ка: „Наве́дни‿се‿ју́наче“. Он се‿на́веднал и‿о́на го‿га́лтнала. И‿и́сто и‿со‿фто́ријот бра́т та́ка. И ќе́лчо че́кал, че́кал, бра́ќава ѓи‿не́ма. Ќи́нисал да‿и́де и о́н. И‿го‿сре́тнал симиџи́јата и му‿ви́ка: „Ка́де, бре‿ќе́лчо“? „У‿то́ва се́ло и́ма една‿ла́мн’а, ќ‿и́дам да‿ја‿уте́пам...

Veles dialect

Еден та́тко си‿и́мал тро́јца си́нови. Сино́вите ре́кле: „Та́тко, ве́днага са́каме да‿не‿же́ниш“. Он им‿ре́кол: „Зе́мете по‿е́дно ста́пче, фрлете од‿ри́дот, и на‿ко́ја ку́ќа ќе‿ви‿па́дне, от‿ту́ка не́веста ќе‿зе́мете“. Фрли ста́риот, у‿а́рна ку́ќа му‿се‿по́годи; фрли среѓниот, и‿не́му та́ка, а‿на‿ма́лиот мо́ре. Два́јцата бра́ќа би́ле сре́ќни, а‿во́ј на́јмалиов не́среќен. Се́днал на‿кра́ј на‿мо́рето и‿му‿ка́жује на‿го́спода: „Го́споди, што́ ќе‿зе́мам од‿мо́ре, цел све́т да‿ми‿се‿сме́е“. Бра́ќата си‿ги‿зе́доја неве́стите и‿се́а ќе‿о́дат да‿ви́дат шо ќе‿зе́ме ма́лиот. Оти́доа до‿мо́ре и‿ги‿пу́штија чинѓе́лите за‿со‿ни́м не́што да‿изма́кнат. Во мо́рето и́мало една‿ма́јка и‿ќе́рка. Ма́јката си‿ја‿че́шла ќе́рката и му‿ви́ка на‿свато́вите: „Кре́нете‿си‿ги чинѓе́лите, не‿сме‿ста́сани“...

== See also ==
- Macedonian language
- Macedonian dialects
