= Kočo Racin =

Macedonian writer and communist

- Кочо Рацин
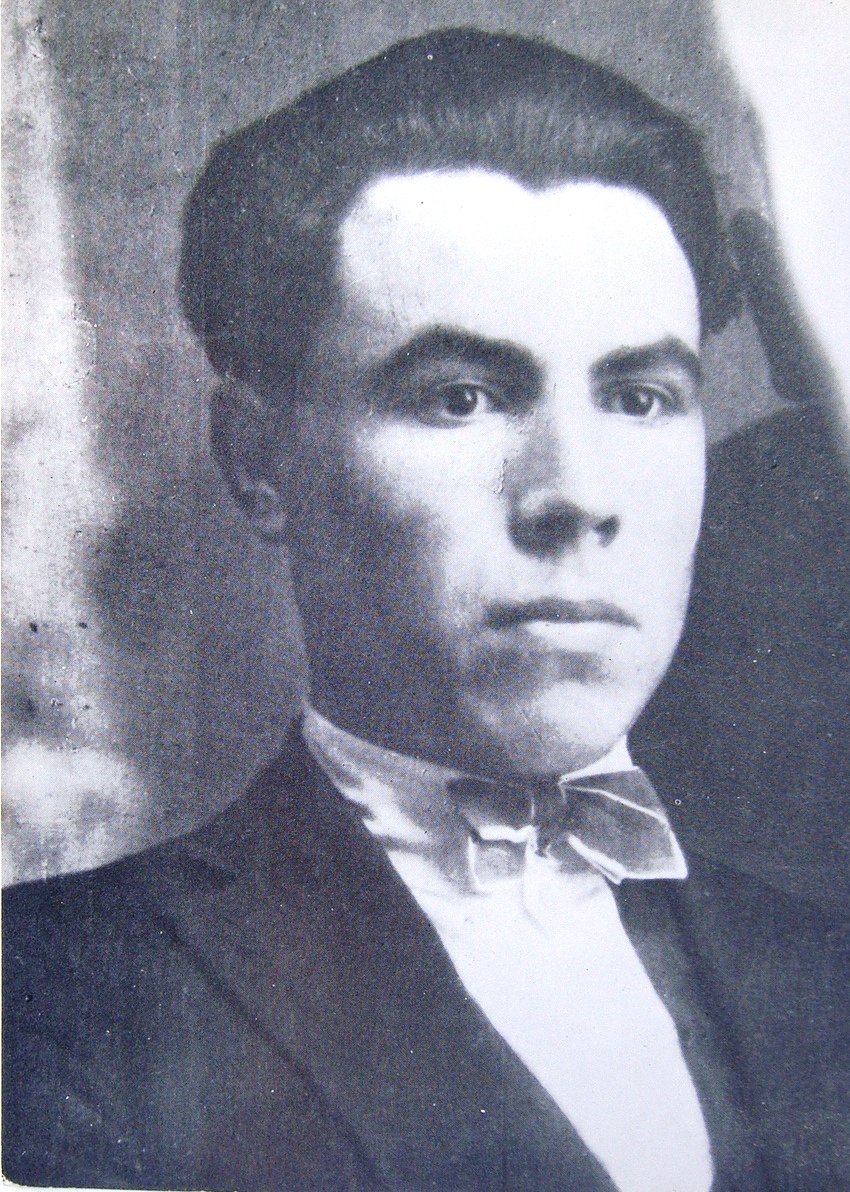
- Born: Kosta Apostolov Solev; 21 December 1908; Veles, Ottoman Empire
- Died: 13 June 1943 (aged 34); Lopušnik, Albanian Kingdom
- Occupation: Writer
- Known for: Foundation of the modern Macedonian literature
- Notable work: White Dawns

Kosta Apostolov Solev (Cyrillic: Коста Апостолов Солев; 22 December 1908 – 13 June 1943), primarily known by his pen name Kočo Racin (Кочо Рацин), was a Macedonian poet, writer and communist who is considered a founder of modern Macedonian literature. He is also regarded as a founder of modern Macedonian poetry. Racin wrote in prose too and created some significant works with themes from history, philosophy, and literary critique. He also wrote in Serbian and Bulgarian.

== Biography ==
=== Early life ===
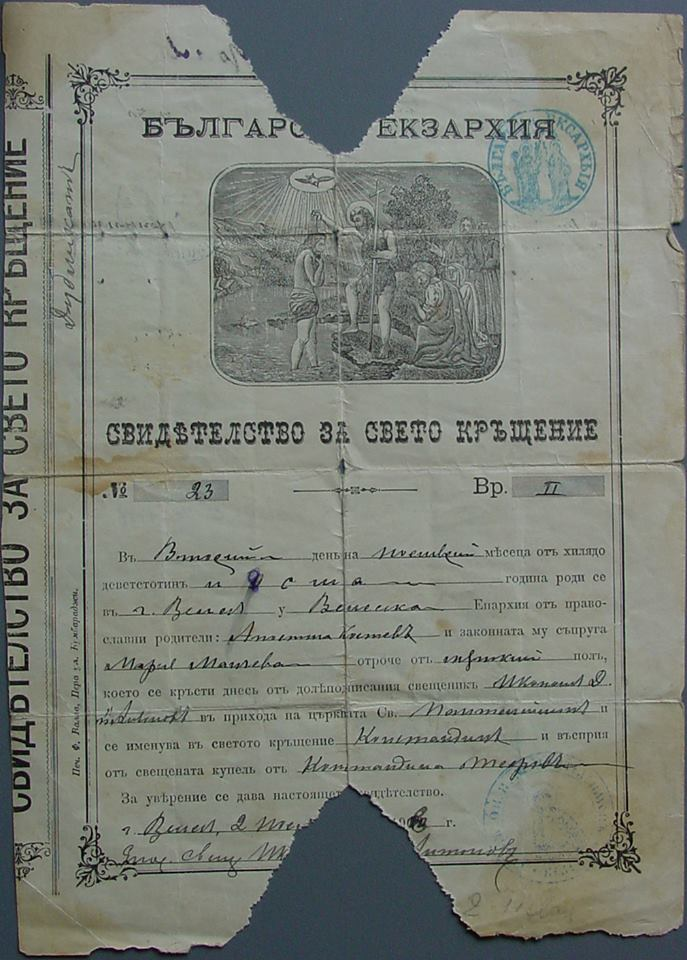
Bulgarian Exarchate birth certificate of Racin.

Kočo (Kosta Solev) Racin was born in 1908 in Veles in then Kosovo vilayet of the Ottoman Empire (present-day North Macedonia) as Konstantin Apostolov Solev into a poor Exarchist family. His father, Apostol was a potter who earned just enough to feed his family, and he could not support Racin financially in his education. Racin finished just one year in the local high school at the age of thirteen and then worked in his father's pottery workshop.

=== Campaigner in the Communist movement ===
In 1924 he took part in KPJ, and in a short time, he positioned himself as one of the most promising young members of the Communist Party of Yugoslavia in Macedonia. In 1926, Racin became a member of the local Committee of KPJ in Veles, and in this period he was writing for the left-wing newspaper Organizovan radnik (Organized worker). In November 1928, he participated in the Fourth Congress of KPJ in Dresden as the only delegate from Macedonia. After returning to Yugoslavia he was arrested, but three months later he was freed because of insufficient evidence. In April 1929 he went into army service in Požarevac.

In 1929, the party organization in Macedonia collapsed. However, in 1932 the process for reuniting the party began, and in the summer of 1933, the Local Committee of KPJ in Macedonia was started, in which Nikola Orovčanec, Živoin Ćurcić and Racin participated. In November of the same year, LM started to issue the monthly newspaper "Iskra" (Spark), whose editor was Racin. Around this time to preserve his identity he would use the pseudonym Konstantin Solevic. Only two editions of the newspaper were produced. In the beginning of January 1934, there was a break-in, and 15 leading Macedonian communists – together with Racin – were arrested. Racin was given 4 years in prison at Sremska Mitrovica, but in December 1935, he was given amnesty under a new law. His time in jail and the association with Moša Pijade, Rodoljub Čolaković and Ognjen Prica instilled in him faith in the importance of writing in his mother tongue (for Racin the Macedonian). Later he participated in the translation of the "Communist manifesto" into Macedonian.

The nickname "Racin" comes from the name of his loved one, Rahilka Firfova-Raca.

=== Ascent and fall: White Dawns and expulsion from the party ===
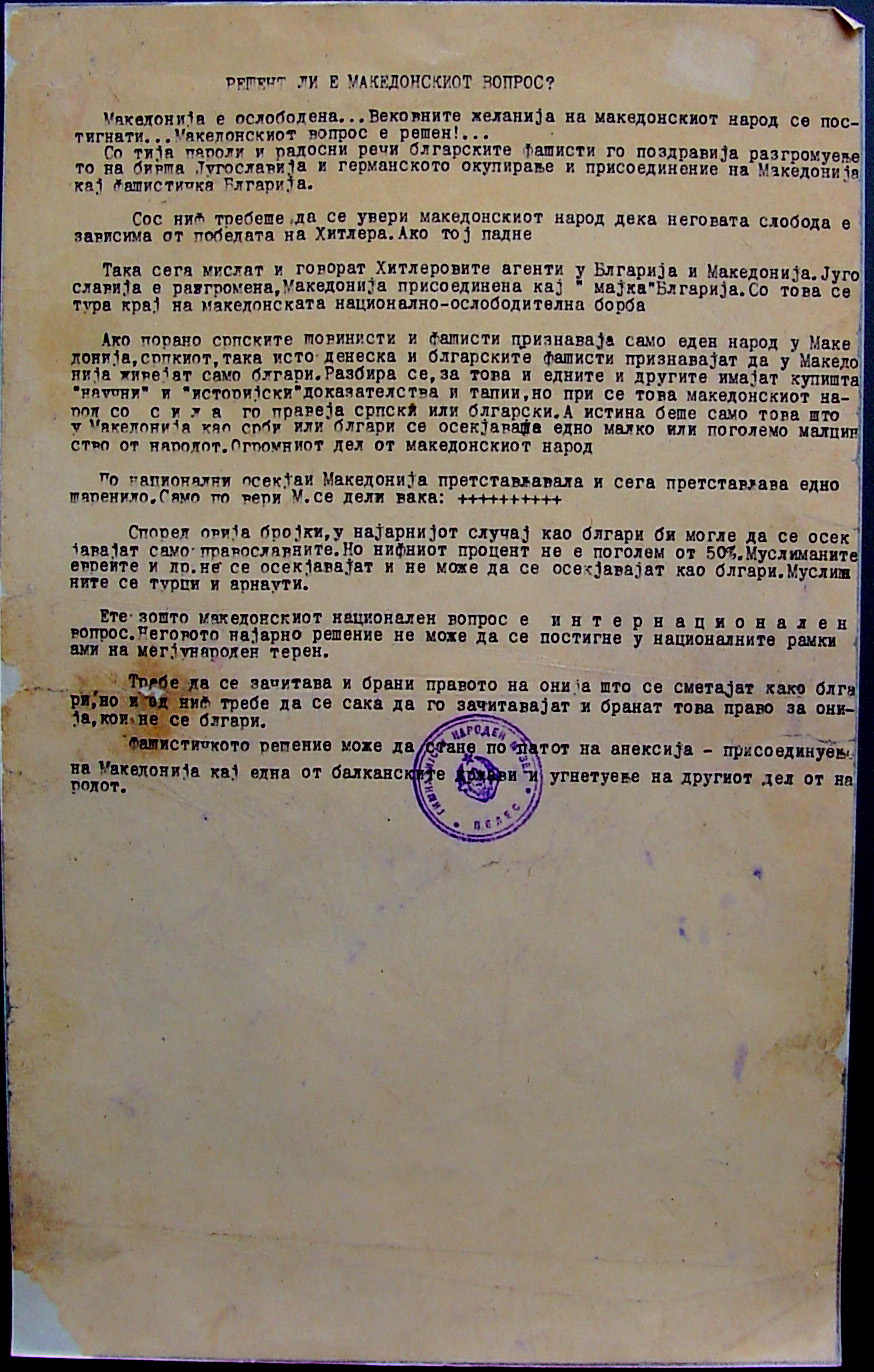
Racin's view on the Macedonian question, in which he states that the Macedonian people were forcefully made into Serbs and Bulgarians, but that the population of Macedonia is diverse. If any ethnic identification is sought, then only the Orthodox Christians would be able to identify as Bulgarians but they are not more than half of the population.

After he came out of jail, Racin started writing poems and songs intensively. In 1939 he published his poem collection, entitled White Dawns (Macedonian: Бели мугри). He also wrote and published some articles and works with themes from history, philosophy and literary critique.

In 1940, allegedly due to his criticism of the KPJ Committee's work in Macedonia or for refusing to take a stand against Miroslav Krleža, Racin was expelled from the party. Its members were encouraged to boycott him. The boycott lasted until 1942 when the relationship between Racin and the party in Macedonia improved. After the capitulation of Yugoslavia, for a period, he worked in Sofia, where he lived with his compatriot Kole Nedelkovski, who shared his thinking. After Nedelkovski's death, Racin returned to Skopje. In Skopje, he was arrested by the Bulgarian police and interned in the village of Kornitsa.

=== Joining the Partisan movement and death ===
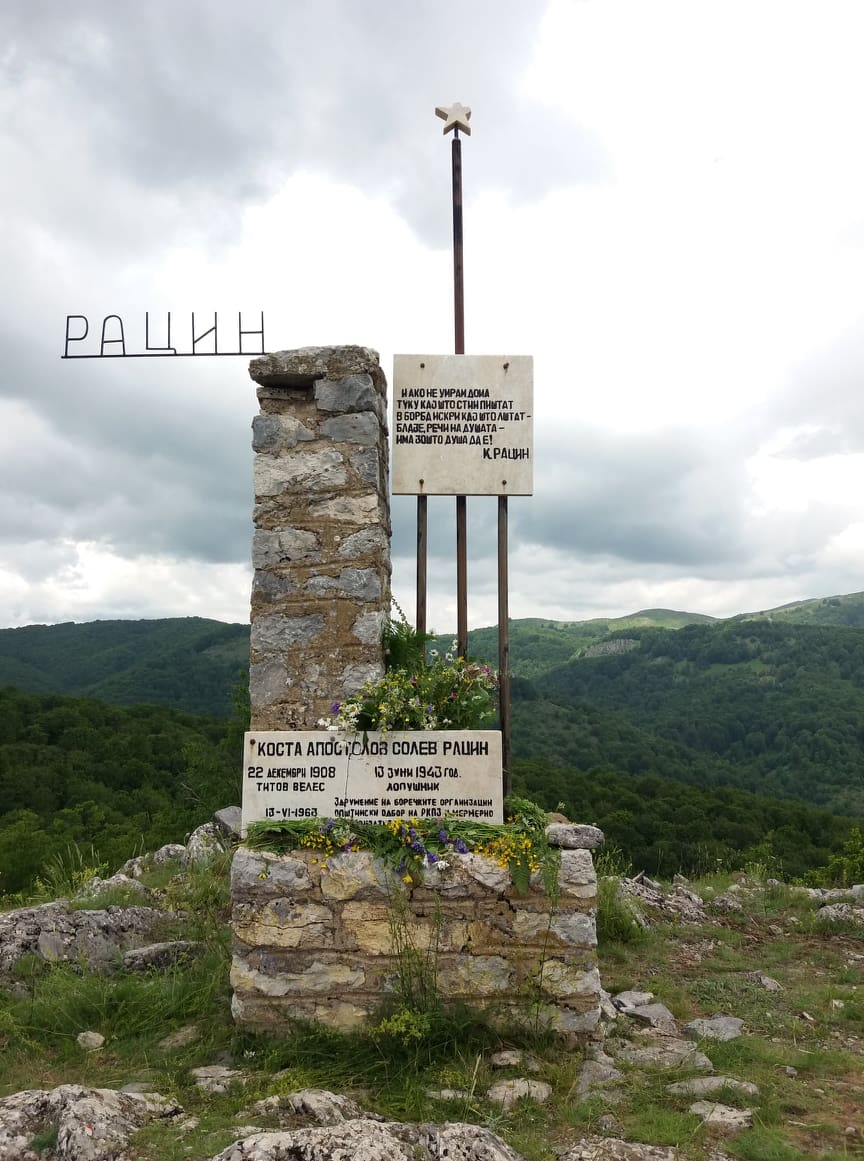
Monument dedicated to Racin on the mountain Lopušnik.

In 1943, Racin succeeded in getting back to Skopje. In the spring, he went to the Partisans, in the Korab detachment. He became an editor of the Partisan newspaper Ilindenski Pat. He also prepared two collections of Macedonian folklore songs.

On the night of 13 June 1943, when he was going back from the Partisan printing house on the mountain Lopušnik, Kičevo, he was mortally shot by the printing-house entrance guard. There are two theories about his death. According to the first, it was an accident: Racin was born with a hearing defect, so he may not have heard the guard's call to stop and identify himself. According to the second version, Racin was murdered. In the opinion of his contemporaries, communist official Strahil Gigov politically isolated Racin and organized his murder.

== Works ==
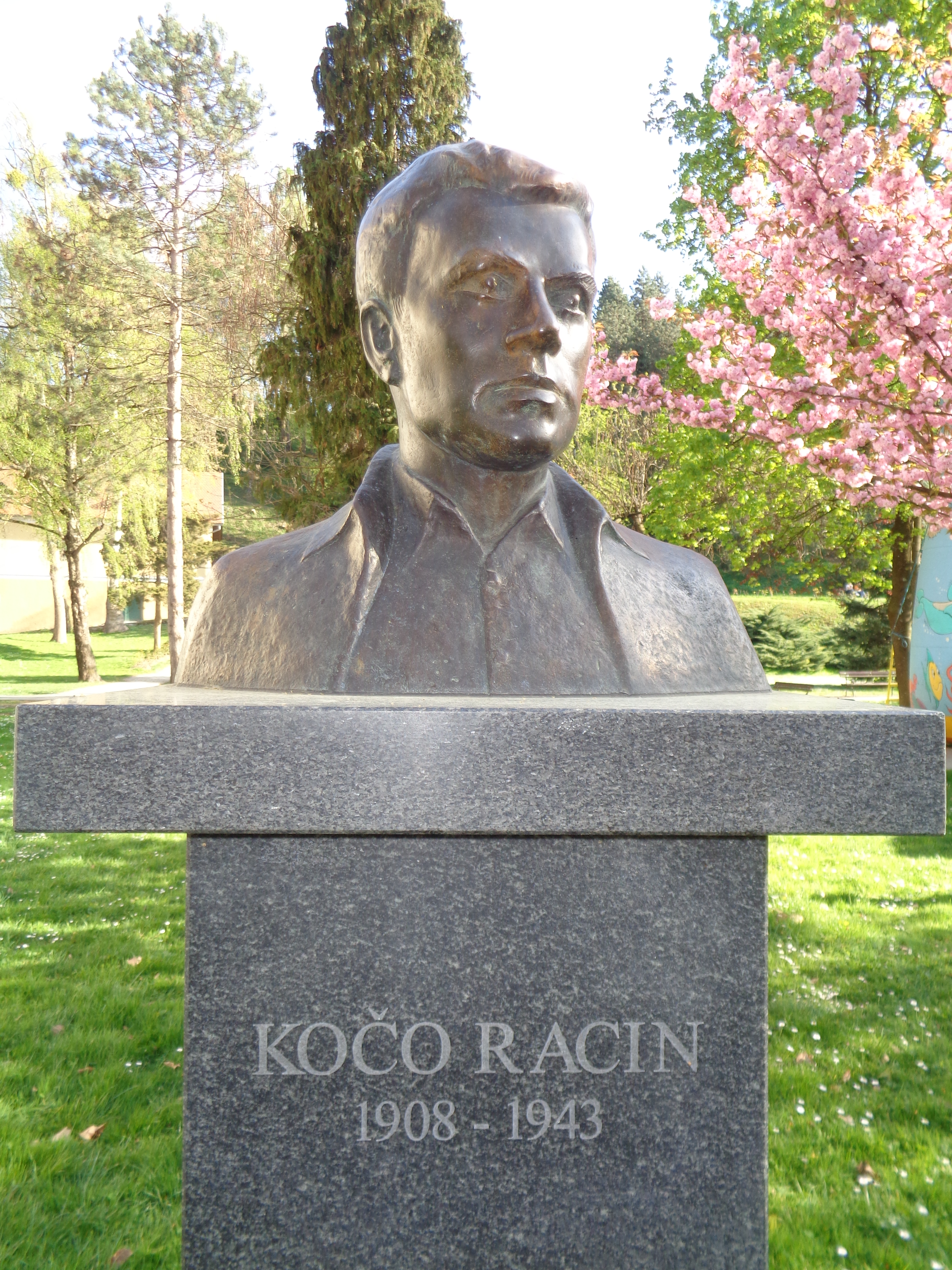
Bust of Racin in Samobor, Croatia.

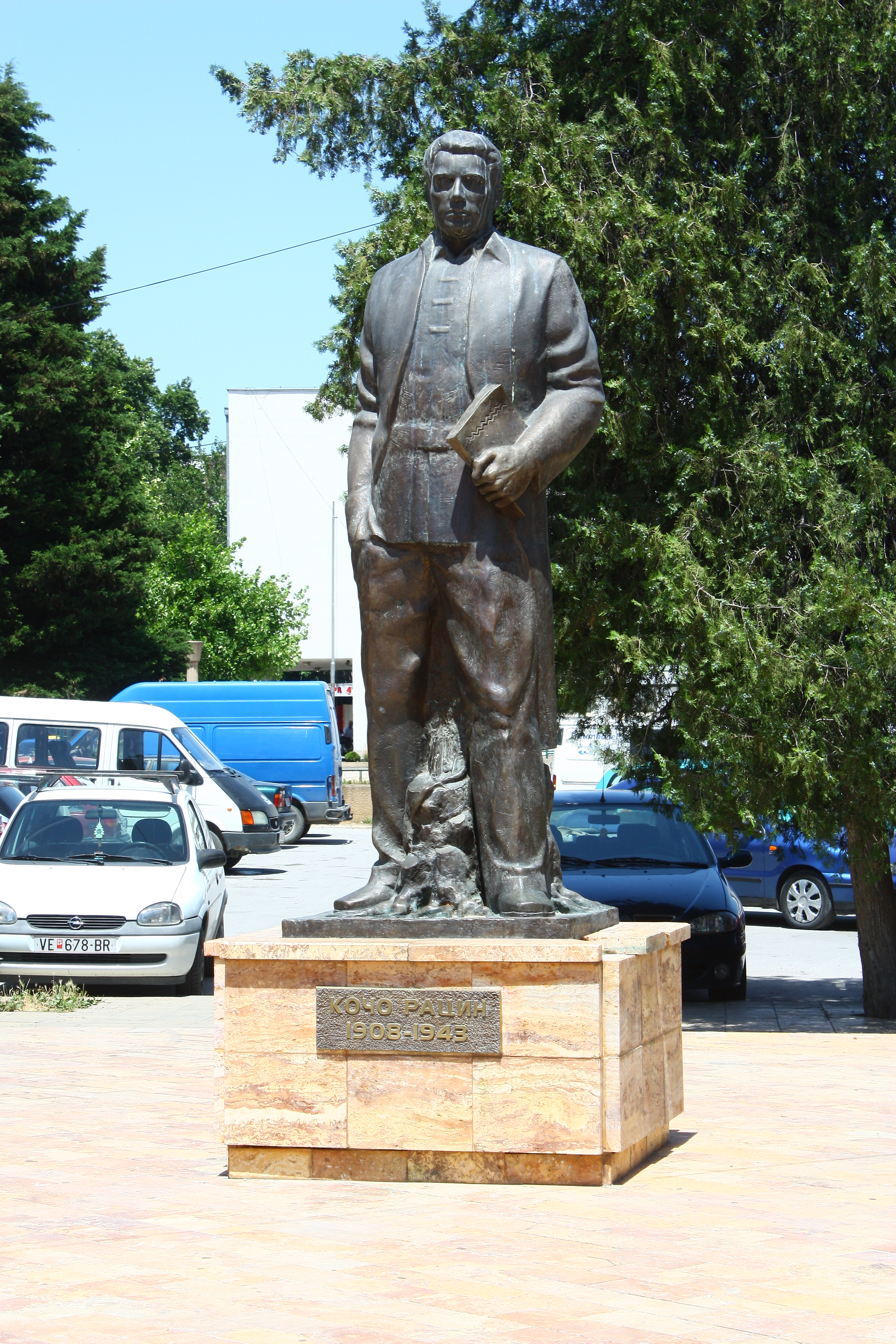
Monument of Kočo Racin in his native Veles.

Starting in 1928, Kočo Racin wrote songs, stories, literary-historical articles, pieces for several magazines, literary critiques, and essays. In his essay "The Development of Our New Literature", he argued that the most correct and plausible way to develop modern literature in Macedonia was to build it from the inexhaustible riches of Macedonian folklore, combined with progressive social views. His most notable work was the small collection White Dawns (Beli mugri), which was published in Samobor in 1939. Racin's interest lay in the plight of field and farm workers and wage earners. American historian Joseph Rothschild described his style as "inspired by traditional folk-lyrics" and his theme as "the hard fate of the poor".

=== Poetry ===
Racin started writing in 1928. From February until July, he dedicated love verses to his loved one, Rahilka Firfova, on 31 cards and in the poem collection entitled Anthology of Pain (Macedonian: Антологија на болката). The 31 cards are kept today in the Archive of North Macedonia. The songs are mainly written in Serbian, except for six songs written in Bulgarian.

The same year, the Zagreb review Kritika published his first poem, "Hungry Sons" (Serbo-Croatian: Синови глади, Sinovi gladi). From May until October 1930, he published four poems in a Sarajevo journal. In 1932 in Skopje, Racin together with Jovan Đorđević and Aleksandar Aksić (students at the Skopje Faculty of Philosophy) published a poem collection in Serbian under the title 1932. This collection includes the poem "Firework" (Ватромет) one of Racin's most powerful poems.

The next published poem was "To a Worker" (Macedonian: До еден работник), which was his first poem in Macedonian. It was published in the Zagreb journal Književnik in 1936. In 1938, the poem "The Death of the Asturian Miner" (Смрт астуриског рудара) was published in honor of Gančo Hadzipanzov, a miner from Veles, who was killed in the Spanish Civil War.

His greatest success came with the publication of the poetry collection White Dawns in 1939. The collection was printed in 4,000 copies and sold all over Yugoslavia and Pirin Macedonia, with great success. The poem collection Macedonian People's Liberation Songs (Македонски народно-ослободителни песни) was published in 1943, but Racin was an editor rather than an author of the collection.

=== Prose ===
Racin's first manuscript was his prose confession Result (Резултат), published in 1928 in the Zagreb review Kritika. In 1932 he participated in the open competition "Literatura" from Zagreb. He was awarded for his story "In the Quarry" (У каменолому), which was later published in Kritika. In 1933, the same review published fragments from his novel Opium (in Macedonian translated as "Poppy", Афион). Racin started writing this novel around 1931, but the manuscript was lost during the break-in and his arrest. Other novels by Racin were: The Tobacco Pickers (Тутуноберачите) (1937), Noon (Пладне) (1937), One Life (Еден живот) (1937), Golden craft (Златен занает) (1939), and the novels Father (Татко) (1939) and Happiness Is Big, which were posthumously published.

=== History ===
Racin was interested in the historical theme of Bogomilism. He wrote three works dedicated to it: Dragovitian bogomils (Драговитските богомили), The Bogomils (Богомилите), and The Country Movement of the Bogomils in the Medieval Period (Селското движење на богомилите во Средниот век). From those three, only The country movement... was published during his lifetime, in 1939 in the review Folklore reader (Народна читанка). The work The Bogomils is written in Macedonian. Racin was the first Macedonian to study the Bogomil movement.

=== Philosophy ===
Racin was especially interested in the theory of Georg Wilhelm Friedrich Hegel. As the result of it, he wrote and published some articles: "Hegel" (Хегел) published in the Zagreb Literatura review and "The meaning of Hegel's philosophy" published in the Belgrade review New culture (Нова култура) in 1939.

His relations with Malina Popivanova also sparked his interest in socialist feminism, which he described as a struggle for fundamental human rights.

=== Literary criticism ===
In the field of literary criticism, Racin wrote the following works and articles: "The development and the meaning of our new literature" (Развитокот и значењето на една нова наша книжевност) (1940), "Anđelko Krstić in front of the court of Ž. Plamenac" (Анѓелко Крстиќ пред судот на Ж. Пламенац) (1939) and "The Realism of A. Krstić" (Реализмот на А. Крстиќ) (posthumously), "The Tired Nonsense about Mona Lisa's smile" (Блазираните глупости за насмевката на Мона Лиза) (1939) and "Art and the Working Class" (posthumously).

== Legacy ==
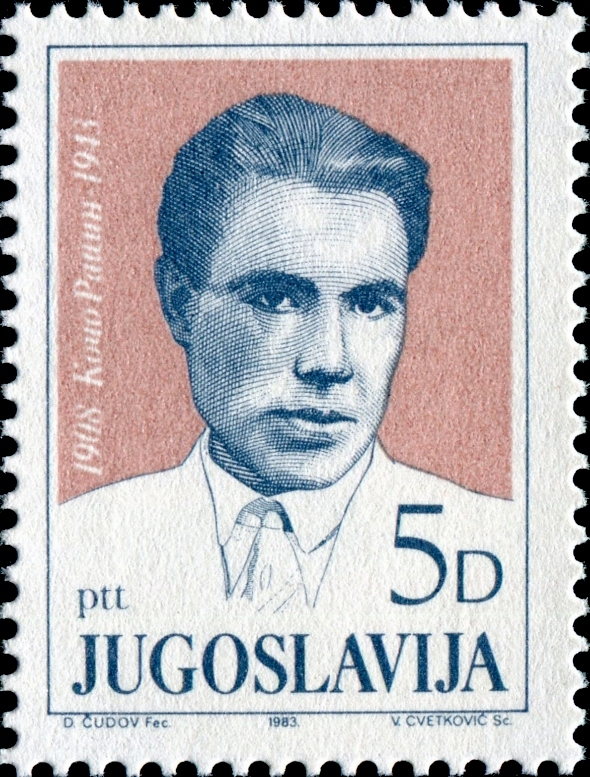
Racin on a 1983 Yugoslavian stamp

In 1952, Trajče Popov recorded the film poem "White Dawns" using the lyrics from his poetry collection. In 1956, his native house in Veles was transformed into a museum. Starting in 1964, an annual poetry festival called "Racin's meetings" was held in Racin's honor in his hometown, Veles. Since 1992 the event has been Balkans-wide. In 2007 (on the day of his death), the movie Elegy for you (Елегија за тебе) dedicated to him was promoted. The authors were Vasil Zafirčev and Dančo Stefkov, with Zafirčev playing the role of Racin.

According to some Bulgarian authors, he had pro-Bulgarian views and was a Bulgarian. Per ethnographer Kosta Tsarnushanov, there are reasonable doubts that Racin was purposefully liquidated, while suspected as an opportunist and pro-Bulgarian oriented communist by the Yugoslav partisans on the orders of Svetozar Vukmanović. Public figures Venko Markovski and his wife Filimena consider him as an author who was part of the Bulgarian literature.

== See also ==
- List of Macedonians (ethnic group)
