= Mile Markovski =

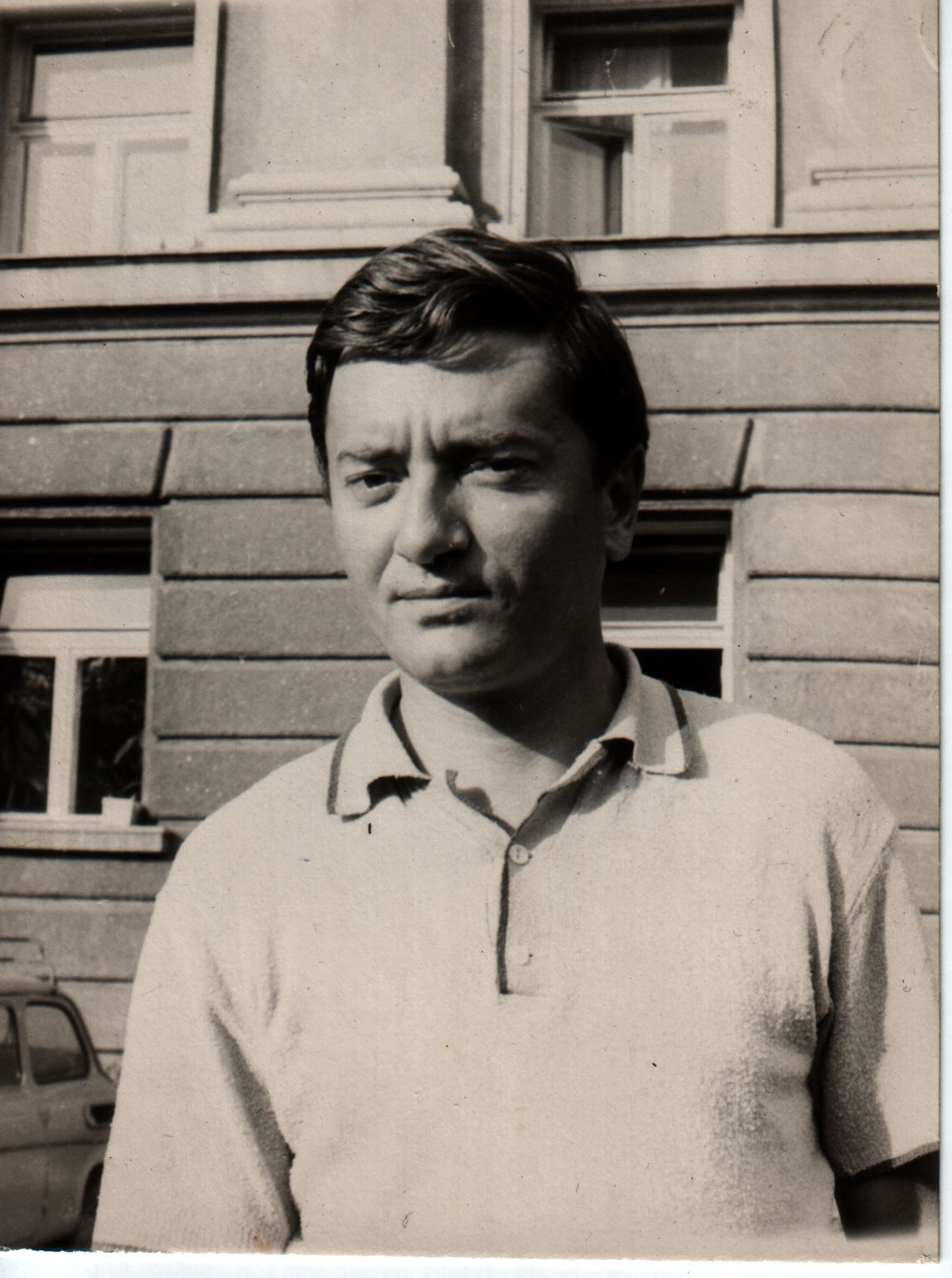
- Born: April 14, 1939; Sofia, Bulgaria
- Died: April 12, 1975 (aged 35); Sofia, Bulgaria
- Occupation: writer
- Writing career
- Genres: children book, satire
- Notable work: Nepresahnali kandila

Mile Markovski (Bulgarian and Macedonian: Миле Марковски; April 14, 1939 – April 12, 1975) was a Bulgarian and Macedonian writer.

== Biography ==
Markovski is born on April 14, 1939, in Sofia, Kingdom of Bulgaria in the family of prominent Macedonian and Bulgarian writer and poet, anti-Nazi partisan and politician Venko Markovski. During the Second World War, Markovski was taken by his parents to the Yugoslav partisans at the age of 5.

After the end of the war, he remained in Skopje, the capital of the newly founded People's Republic of Macedonia, where he graduated Slavic philology at the University of Skopje.

Until 1968 he lived and worked in Skopje, as an editor-in-chief of the "Nas svet" newspaper, published by Detska Radost publishing house. He was also an active chess player, competing in Yugoslavia.

Forced by the Yugoslav secret police UDBA, in 1968 he moved with his family to Bulgaria, where his father, Venko Markovski, was already living in exile.

In Bulgaria he was deputy editor-in-chief of the Septemvriiche newspaper. He was a member of the Union of Bulgarian Writers, where he developed close relationship with writers like Georgi Konstantinov, Atanas Dalchev, Boris Krumov and others. His books include novels for children, satire, legends and sci-fi.

He has been awarded a number of literary awards in Bulgaria, and has been actively engaged in public readings throughout the country. For many years, he was the writer of monthly comics in the Slaveiche magazine.

Mile Markovski died in a car accident on April 12, 1975, in Sofia at the age of 35. He was married and had two children - Internet pioneer Veni Markovski and actor and journalist Igor Markovski. He was survived by his wife, Alexandra.

== Bibliography ==
=== In Macedonian ===
- Nedelia sledobed (Sunday Afternoon)
- Malko za Ramce (A Little About Ramche)

=== In Bulgarian ===
- Grad prikazka (Fairytale City)
- Ramche i slunceto (Ramche and the Sun)
- Pyasachko (Sandy, 1974)
- Prikazki ot osmia den (Stories from the 8th Day)
- Gyba pod chadar (Mushroom Under the Umbrella)
- Vazduh s pensia (Retired Air)
- Nepresahnali kandila (Eternal Candles)
- Zabavnite prikljuchenia na Vesel Mecho (The Fun Adventures of Happy Bear)
- Tvardoglavo vreme (Die Hard Time)
