= Internet Society – Bulgaria =

Internet Society - Bulgaria
- Founded: December 4, 1995; 30 years ago
- Purpose: Internet users' rights, Internet-related laws
- Location: Sofia, Bulgaria
- Key people: Veni Markovski (Chairman of the Board), Dimitar Ganchev (Secretary of the Board)
- Website: www.isoc.bg

Internet Society – Bulgaria is a non-governmental organization (NGO) for public benefit, founded on December 4, 1995, in Sofia by a group of Bulgarian Internet professionals.

== History ==
ISOC-Bulgaria was founded in 1995. It became known worldwide in 1999, when it successfully sued the government of Ivan Kostov against the proposed licensing of the Internet Service Providers in Bulgaria.

In 2001, through ISOC-Bulgaria's influence, Voice over Internet Protocol (VoIP) remained outside of the monopoly of the national telecom, which allowed a great variety of new Internet service providers to start operating in Bulgaria.

== Activities ==
ISOC-Bulgaria has been involved in a number of projects, related to usage and promotion of free and open source software, among them:

- - the Free and Open Source Software Project for South East Europe;
- - towards Open Source Software adoption and dissemination;
- - Free/Libre/Open Source Software: Worldwide impact study.

In 2005 — 2006 ISOC-Bulgaria launched the Bulgarian version of Creative Commons.

ISOC Bulgaria was a key player during the WSIS (2002–2005).

Before that, in 1999 and in 2001 through its influence, Bulgaria became the first country to legally accept full freedom of access to the Internet by changing its Telecommunications Law, which leaves the domain name system and the IP Address allocation outside of the control of the government.

ISOC Bulgaria has been actively involved in the Global Internet Policy Initiative (GIPI), headed by George Sadowsky, and has contributed to formation of governmental IT-policy in a number of countries, not only in Bulgaria.

Since 2002 ISOC Bulgaria has been running, together with Access to Information Program, the Bulgarian edition of the Big Brother Awards, with their latest edition in 2019. The awards are given to institutions, organizations and individuals, who violate citizens' privacy in Bulgaria.

== Members ==
Among hundreds of its members are former Bulgarian presidents Georgi Parvanov and Peter Stoyanov, former prime ministers Sergey Stanishev and Ivan Kostov, many politicians, IT-experts, journalists, and many others.

== Board ==
ISOC-Bulgaria board consists of:

- Veni Markovski - chairman
- Dimitar Ganchev - vice-chairman
- Georgi Kirov - member

== More information ==
ISOC-Bulgaria is an official chapter of the international Internet Society, based in Reston, Virginia and Geneva, Switzerland. More information can be found at ISOC-Bulgaria's web site, and on their blog.
