= Nikola Vaptsarov Naval Academy =

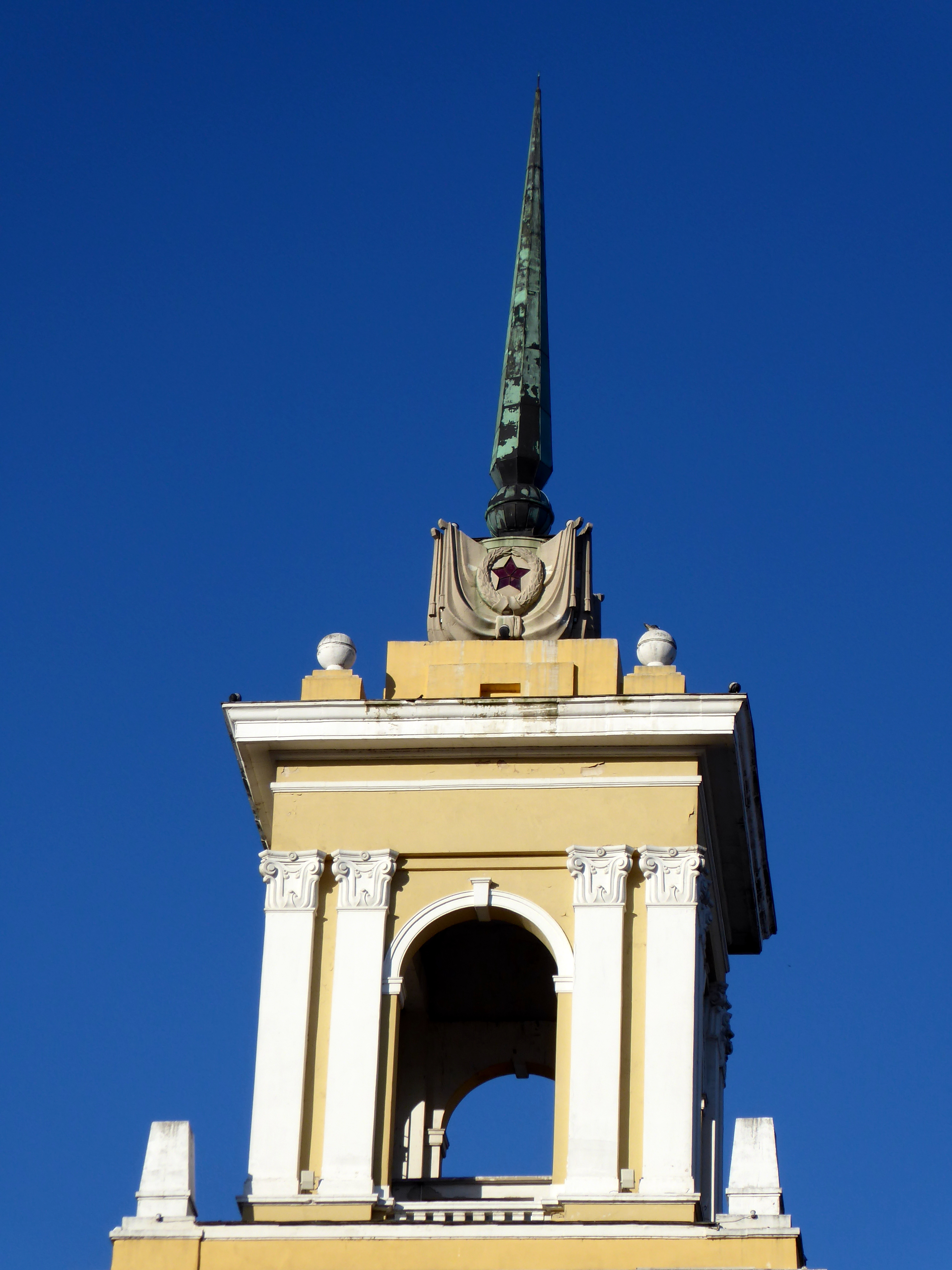
- Motto: Filii maris sumus
- Motto in English: We are children of the sea
- Established: 1881
- Commander (Rector): Flotilla admiral Kalin Kalinov, Professor DSc
- Location: Varna, Bulgaria
- Badge
- Website: www.naval-acad.bg

Nikola Vaptsarov Naval Academy (NVNA) (Bulgarian: Висше Военноморско Училище "Никола Йонков Вапцаров", ВВМУ) is the oldest technical educational institution in the Republic of Bulgaria. Its history, past and present achievements establish the institution as the most prestigious centre for training maritime (merchant marine and Navy) specialists in the country. Its development over the years resembles a navigable river, into which many tributaries flow, as well as the "prototypes" of the present-day faculties, departments, and vocational colleges constituting the Nikola Vaptsarov Naval Academy.

The foundations of maritime education in this country were laid in the city of Ruse pursuant to Circular order No.7/January 16, 1881 of the Ministry of War of the Principality of Bulgaria. The circular order announced the establishment of a Maritime School, as of January 9, 1881.

Lieutenant commander Alexander Egorovich Konkevich, the founder of the institution, was the "Superintendent" of the Fleet and the Maritime Unit (the official name of the Bulgarian Navy in the 19th century).

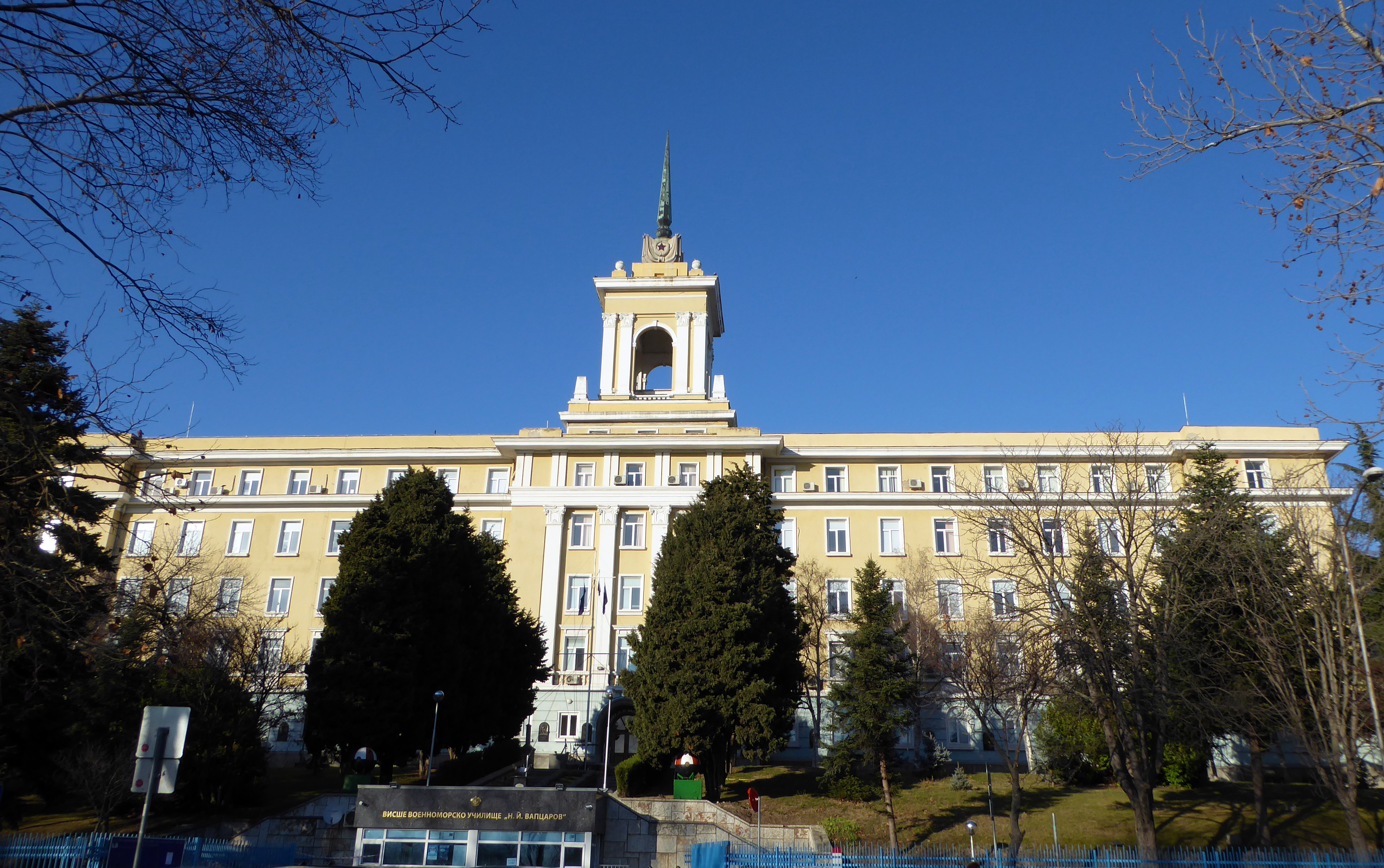
VVMU Varna.

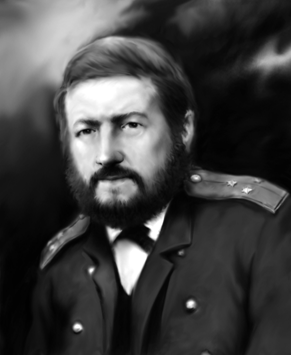
Lieutenant Commander Alexander Konkevich, the first Commander of the Bulgarian Navy and founder of the Maritime School

== Early years (1881–1919) ==
The Maritime School was entrusted with the task to train machinists and stokers for the Navy of the principality. After 1883, official documents refer to the school as "Machine School", "Technical School", "Machine Class", but it did not change its status and continued to successfully train technical specialists for the Fleet and the Navy. In 1885, graduates of the school fought in the Serbo-Bulgarian War and two of them received awards for their gallantry. Under the influence of the reforms of the Minister of Education Georgi Zhivkov, the last decade of the 19th century is characterized by the development of educational institutions in Bulgaria. This process also affected many aspects of the maritime education. As a result, in 1892 the school was reorganized and renamed Petty officer Naval School which trained boatswains, ratings, artillerymen, miners and machinist mates. That same year the first diploma of the naval Alma mater preserved for posterity was awarded.

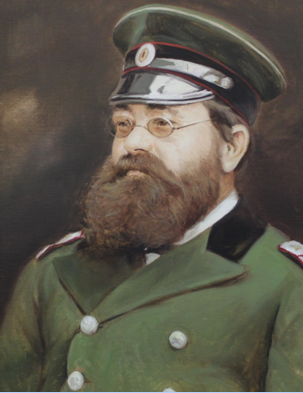
The first Commandant of the Maritime School 2nd Lt. Dip (Eng) Pavel Alexeevich Mashnin (1848, Sevastopol – 1900, Port Arthur).

In 1893, the first Temporary Course in Naval Sciences for training of line officers was organized in the city of Ruse. Insofar as the Maritime School of 1881 was not only the start of the Naval Academy, but also a prototype of the modern Engineering Faculty and most departments in it. The Temporary Officer Course of 1893 was a prototype of the modern Navigation Faculty, as well as departments in it such as Naval Tactics Department, Navigation and Fleet And Ports Operation. In fact, the organization of the "Temporary Course" marks the beginning of the historical development of the educational structures training navigational specialists in this country.

The course trained officers, graduates of the Military School in Sofia, to acquire naval qualifications, as well as Bulgarian graduates of foreign naval schools who for some reason did not manage to graduate abroad. The participants in the Temporary Officer Course passed and exam and were awarded the qualifications of naval officers.

At the turn of the 20th century, the Sub-officer Maritime School made a new step forward. In 1900 it was headed by lieutenant Todor Solarov. It was during his time in office that the institution was moved to the city of Varna and renamed Engineering School to the Fleet. Todor Solarov justified the need for more thorough training of its graduates, as a result of which in 1904, with an act of the National Parliament, it became the first technical secondary school in the country and the duration of training was extended to six years. In 1906 the school issued the first matriculation certificates. In 1910, the first building specially designed and erected for the needs of the Engineering School to His Majesty's Fleet was built in Varna.

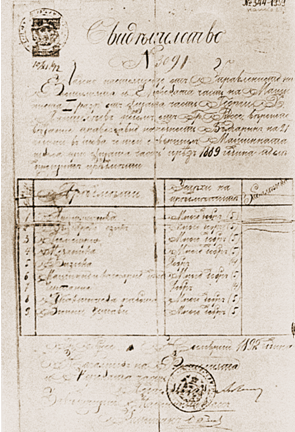
Diploma of graduate Hadzhipanteleev from 1892. The oldest diploma of the Maritime School preserved for posterity.

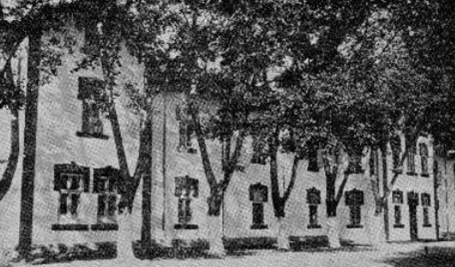
1913–1916 The building of the Engineering School to His Majesty's Fleet.

The unit which remained in Ruse was renamed Miner and Stoker School (Miner school with stoker training) with duration of training of four years, including practical training, with the first two-year of training recognized as compulsory military service for the students. The Miner and Stoker School was temporarily closed down in 1909. In 1912, due to the fleet's increased need of technical specialists, it was reopened under the name Maritime Special Schools, which in turn were subordinate to the newly formed structure in Varna called Training Unit (later renamed Maritime Training Unit). The schools were established in 1912. In 1913 they admitted the first class of 34 cadets. Originally, the Maritime Special Schools consisted of three units: mining and electrical engineering, stoker and steersman. During World War I, the Diver School and Radiotelegraphy School were formed and briefly functioned. The duration of training in the schools was four years. They can be seen as the prototype of the present-day Postgraduate Studies Department and Professional Sergeant College within the Nikola Vaptsarov Naval Academy.

By 1912, the Training Unit included not only the Special Schools, but also the Engineering School to His Majesty's Fleet. In the wars for national unification (1912–1918), graduates of the Training Unit participated in the mine laying and mine sweeping operations, the attack against the Ottoman cruiser Hamidiye, the Assault operations in Balchik, Kavarna and Kaliakra, the Engagement of Balchik on December 13, 1916. They had the honour of mastering the new naval equipment: seaplanes and the first Bulgarian submarine. This was the period when French, and then German language studies were introduced and as a result, some of the graduates of the Engineering School to His Majesty's Fleet were selected to become naval officers and sent for training at the Academia Navale in Livorno (Italy – 1914), and later at the Marineschule Mürwik (Germany – 1916–1918).

Changes occurred in the Engineering School also. In 1917, after a short training course for a select group of graduates of the naval Alma mater, the first officer class graduated. In 1918, the school received the building of the present-day Aquarium in the Sea Garden, where it remained until 1922. After the wars for national unification, the maritime education system underwent another reorganization. The Training Unit was now called the Maritime Training Unit and for the first time it was in charge of all educational structures from which most modern faculties, departments and colleges of the Nikola Vaptsarov Naval Academy originate.

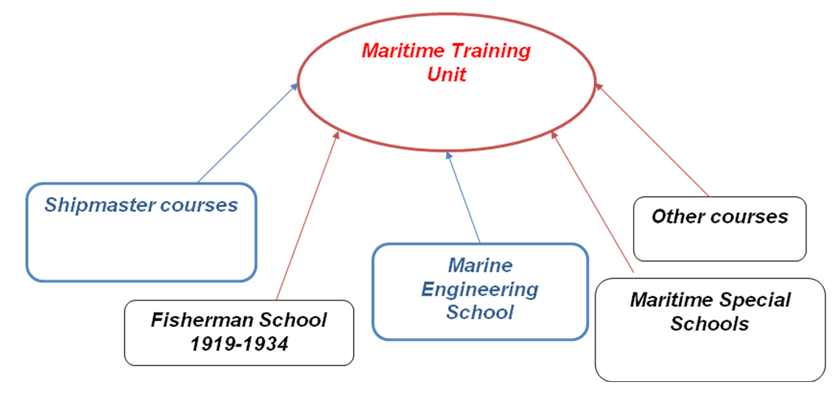
The Maritime Training Unit (1912–1948) and its subordinate structures in the period 1927–1931.

== The establishment of the present name ==
In the period 1919–1920, the officer training course was not only successfully conducted but also the first graduates, pursuant to Decree of the Council of Ministers No. 6/ June 1, 1920, were issued a certificate for completed higher specialized naval education "following the full curriculum of the Maritime Corps in St. Petersburg". Diplomas of higher education were also issued to the participants in the preceding courses. Later the curriculum of this structure was significantly improved. In 1925 and 1928, based on the accumulated experience, two Shipmaster courses were formed, after taking which the trainees, after many years of theoretical and practical training, were issued diplomas for completed higher specialized naval education. Later some of them became prominent members of the Maritime Police Service (the official title under which the Bulgarian Navy existed under the terms of the Treaty of Neuilly-sur-Seine) and "master mariners" at the Bulgarian Commercial Shipping Company (the predecessor of Navigation Maritime Bulgare LTD)

Under the terms of the peace treaty of Neuilly-sur-Seine, in the spring of 1921, His Majesty's navy was disbanded. But a year earlier, the Engineering School was no longer subordinate to the War Ministry and was renamed Marine Engineering School. Practical parts of the training were conducted in the arsenals, on board ships, in electrical engineering classrooms, in telephone exchanges, in radio transmitter rooms, in power plants, in railway depots and workshops, on board the destroyers, in Bozhurishte, in the mines in Pernik and many other places. For a time the school was subordinate to the Ministry of Industry and Labour, and later – to the Ministry of Railways, Communications and Ports. Graduates could continue their studies in all tertiary technical institutions.

Practically, immediately after the end of the First World War, the Steersman School (unit), part of the Maritime Special Schools, was separated and transformed into Fisherman School, which existed until April 1, 1934.

In 1929, the status of the Marine Engineering School was set out in a special law and it was renamed Maritime School. Two years later a Seagoing Department was created, which was tasked with training watch officers for the merchant marine. The officers of the Maritime Police Service were trained partly in the Maritime School in Varna and graduated from the Military School in Sofia. The college in Sofia, which later became a tertiary institution in 1923, issued their diplomas insofar as an officer needs to have college education and under the terms of the Treaty of Neuilly-sur-Seine Bulgaria was allowed to have only one military college.

In 1930, the Maritime Special Schools were reorganized and three new units were created: Electrical Engineering, Mechanical and Motor. Their programs (i.e. curricula) were supplemented and improved. The Engineering School and Miner and Stoker School, later renamed Maritime Special Schools, were the first educational institutions in the country which not only trained hundreds of qualified specialists for the needs of the navy and the emerging Bulgarian industry. They became the backbone of the middle technical level personnel in the country.

In 1934, the Marine Engineering School was moved into the buildings of the already closed Fisherman School on the island of St. Cyril near the town of Sozopol. In 1940, the school returned to Varna in the large imposing building on Stefan Karadzha Street. That same year, its graduates participated in the assault operation in Balchik during the return of Southern Dobruja in the borders of the Kingdom of Bulgaria.

In 1942, with a royal decree, the Maritime School received the status of specialized higher maritime school and the name His Majesty's Naval School. In 1943, a Maritime unit was opened in the Reserve Officer School – Varna, created to His Majesty's Naval School for training of officers of the reserve for the Navy.

In the period 1945–1946, the school was called "Naval People's School to the Maritime Forces", and in 1946–1949 – "People's Naval School". In 1949, the Naval School adopted as its patron Nikola Vaptsarov, a poet, graduate of the school from the Class of 1926 and received the name N. Y. Vaptsarov People's Naval School.

== Present days and activities ==
A special page in the history of the naval Alma mater is the training of foreign cadets, an objective criteria for the increased international prestige of the educational institution. The beginning was in 1953 when some Czech students and Albanian cadets were admitted. By 1994, a total of 141 foreigners from eleven countries on four continents received their college diplomas from N. Y. Vaptsarov Naval Academy.

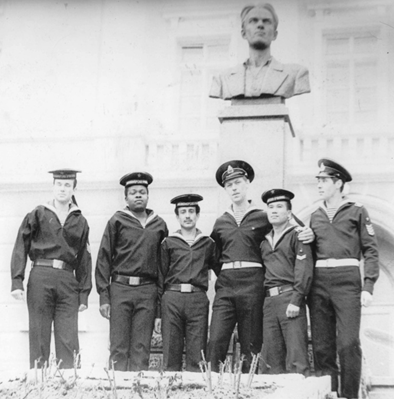
Circa 1986. Foreign cadets in front of the monument of the school's patron.

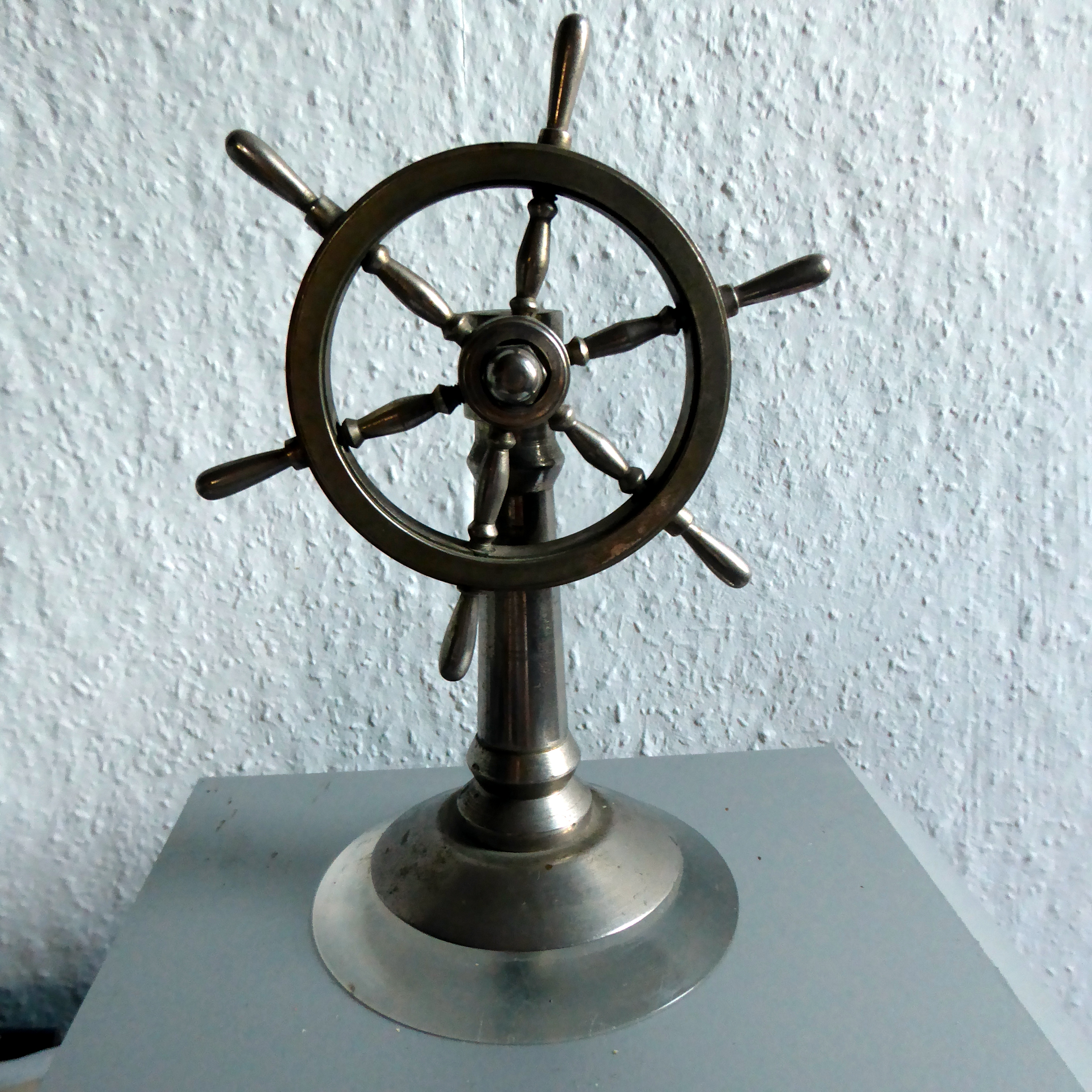
Award for achievements in the framework of the Movement for "Technical and Scientific Creativity of the Navy Youth" (TNTFM, in Bulgarian ТНТФМ), IXth session, 1977, to graduate engineer Atanas Totchkov.

In 1954, the school moved into its present facility on 73, Vasil Drumev Street. With a Decree of the Presidium of the National Assembly of 1956, it received the status of higher engineering maritime school and was renamed N. Y. Vaptsarov People's Higher Naval School. In 1960, it was entered in the registers of the International Maritime Organization (IMO) to UN, which recognized its diplomas before all ship owners in the world.

In 1968, an additional floor was added to the main building on campus. Since 1991, the school's name has been Nikola Vaptsarov Naval Academy. In 2000, the Naval Academy was entered in IMO's White List as an approved provider of maritime education and training, conforming to the STCW 78/95. In 2001, with a decision of the National Agency for Assessment and Accreditation to the Council of Ministers, it received full accreditation as a university, in accordance with the new Law on Higher Education. In 2000, it received an ISO 9002.4 quality certificate for the discipline "Navigation" from the Lloyd's Register, and in 2004 – ISO 9001-2000 for all disciplines. In September 2007, at the request of the Defence Minister and with an order of the Minister for Education and Science of Republic of Bulgaria, the Professional Petty Officer College to the Nikola Vaptsarov Naval Academy in Varna was founded.

Nowadays, the academy continues to train officers for the Bulgarian Navy and the Merchant Marine according to world-acknowledged standards. Bulgarian Naval officers are prepared for their duty at sea and they take part in many exercises in close cooperation with NATO ships. Graduating officers for the merchant fleet find their professional career as captains and ship power-plant engineers in foreign countries such as the US, England, Japan, France, Germany, Norway, Italy, Greece, Israel, Turkey, Philippines, etc. During their years at the academy, sea-going students and cadets engage in rowing, swimming and sailing training as well as boat steering. They also do double duties in different roles during the practice on board the Navy ships and Merchant vessels. At the end of the educational process they practice as third officer. Additionally, there are series of naval exercises and sailing competitions that sea-going students and cadets can take part in.

An important international activity for the Nikola Vaptsarov Naval Academy is its membership in the International Association of Maritime Universities (IAMU) since 2004. The academy takes active role in the development of the organization and supports the development of strategies in maritime education and training (MET). It also serves for two mandates as regional representative for Europe. In addition to that, the academy has hosted some of the committee meetings of IAMU. Students of the academy have attended international student meetings related to popularization of the maritime profession.
