= Traicho Kostov =

Bulgarian politician (1897–1949)

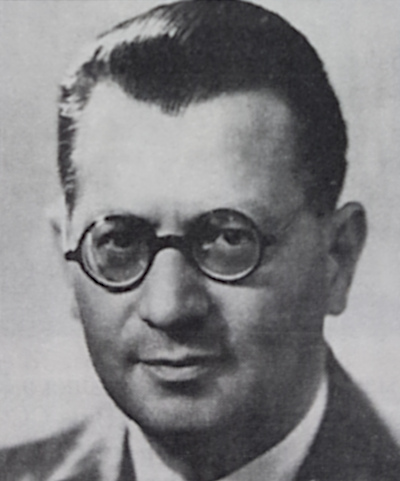
Traicho Kostov

Traycho Kostov Dzhunev (Bulgarian: Трайчо Костов Джунев; 17 June 1897 – 16 December 1949) was a Bulgarian politician. He was a leading figure of the Bulgarian Communist Party.

Kostov, as the President of the Council of Ministers and Secretary of the Central Committee of the Bulgarian Communist Party, was sentenced to death by the Bulgarian Supreme Court. He was tried together with ten others in Sofia, from 7 December until 14 December 1949. Two days later, he was executed.

== Dismissal, trial and execution ==
On 31 March 1949 Kostov was dismissed from his post of acting President of the Council of Ministers and President of the Economic-Financial Committee of the Council of Ministers. Fifteen days later he was appointed Director of the Bulgarian National Library in Sofia. At a plenum of the Central Committee held on 11 and 12 June 1949, Vasil Kolarov delivered an indictment of Kostov's anti-Party activity.

Kostov was accused of tolerating and spreading anti-Soviet sentiment in the Party because of his nationalistic deviation, of using anti-Party methods in the Party and Government leadership and trying to kindle a factional struggle in the Party, of attempting to cause mistrust in the Communist Party and the Party leader, Georgi Dimitrov. Kostov was dismissed from the Central Committee, expelled from the Party and deprived of his seat in the National Assembly. He was arrested on 20 June 1949.

In December 1949, together with Traicho Kostov, 10 other prominent Communists were tried. Kostov was sentenced to death on the grounds that he had organized the headquarters of an underground organization aiming to overthrow the government by violence, had committed actions aiming at the worsening of the friendly relations between Bulgaria and the Soviet Union and the other people's democracies, had placed himself under the orders of the British, American and Yugoslav intelligence services for espionage, that while fulfilling state duties and instructions before foreign governments he had deliberately performed his services and carried out his instructions to the detriment of the state and he had committed acts aiming at the disorganization of the national economy and the supply system of the country and that he had close political connections with Tito, who had broken with Stalin. Kostov repudiated his written confession and the trial proceeded in his absence.

A further indictment was Kostov's outspoken criticism of the USSR's economic practices in Eastern Europe. At the time, the USSR was buying Bulgarian tobacco at an incredibly low price and then flooding the world market with it - at prices which undercut Bulgaria (G. and N. Swain, 2003). Another example of this type is Polish coal. The other 10 accused prominent Communists, among them ministers and high Party officials, received life imprisonment, 15 or 12 years sentences.

Kostov's trial was followed in 1950 and 1951 by several other trials against his adherents. During the preparation of these staged trials most inhuman types of interrogation methods were used and more than 30 prominent Communists were sentenced to long term imprisonment.

== Reassessment ==
The start of open de-Stalinization in the Soviet Union led to a reassessment of the Kostovite trials. On 11 April 1956, at a Sofia City Communist Party meeting it was stated that: a harmful consequence of the personality cult had been the infringement of the laws, as a result of which innocent people were unjustly accused and sentenced.

The accusations contained in the indictment and in other materials presented at the Traicho Kostov trial and at other trials that followed, in which those sentenced were unjustly accused of espionage, sabotage and criminal relations with Yugoslav state organisations and leaders, were dismissed as being fabricated and not true. All those detained because of these trials had been set free. A commission of the Central Committee had been entrusted with checking the materials on the trials, so that all innocently accused would be rehabilitated.

A decision of the Central Committee, published on 19 September 1956, approved the statements and the conclusions of the commission which had reviewed the Kostov trial and the trials connected with it. It also legally rehabilitated and restored party membership to all those convicted in the trials. Kostov himself was posthumously rehabilitated and readmitted to the party. The legal annulment of the sentences had been made by the Bulgarian Supreme Court on 6 November 1956. This decision of the Court was not made public in the Bulgarian press.

== List of defendants ==
- Traicho Kostov Djunev (1897), President of the Council of Ministers, General Secretary of the Central Committee of the Bulgarian Communist Party (executed)
- Ivan Stefanov Hadzhimateev (1899), Minister of Finance (life imprisonment)
- Nikola Pavlov Kolev (1906), Deputy Minister of Construction (life imprisonment)
- Nikola Nachev Petkov (1905), Assistant President of the State Committee for Economic and Financial Affairs (life imprisonment)
- Boris Andonov Hristov (1912), commercial representative in the USSR (15 years)
- Tsonyu Stefanov Tsonchev (1898), Governor of the Bulgarian National Bank (15 years)
- Ivan Slavov Gevrenov (1884), Director of the United Rubber Industry (life imprisonment)
- Ivan Georgiev Tutev (1902), Director of the Department of Foreign Trade (life imprisonment)
- Blagoi Ivanov Hadzhipanzov (1911), counselor of the Yugoslav Embassy (15 years)
- Vasil Atanassov Ivanovski (1906), instructor at the Department of Agitation and Propaganda (12 years)
- Iliya Ivanov Bayaltsaliev (1911), political leader at the United Construction Industry (10 years)

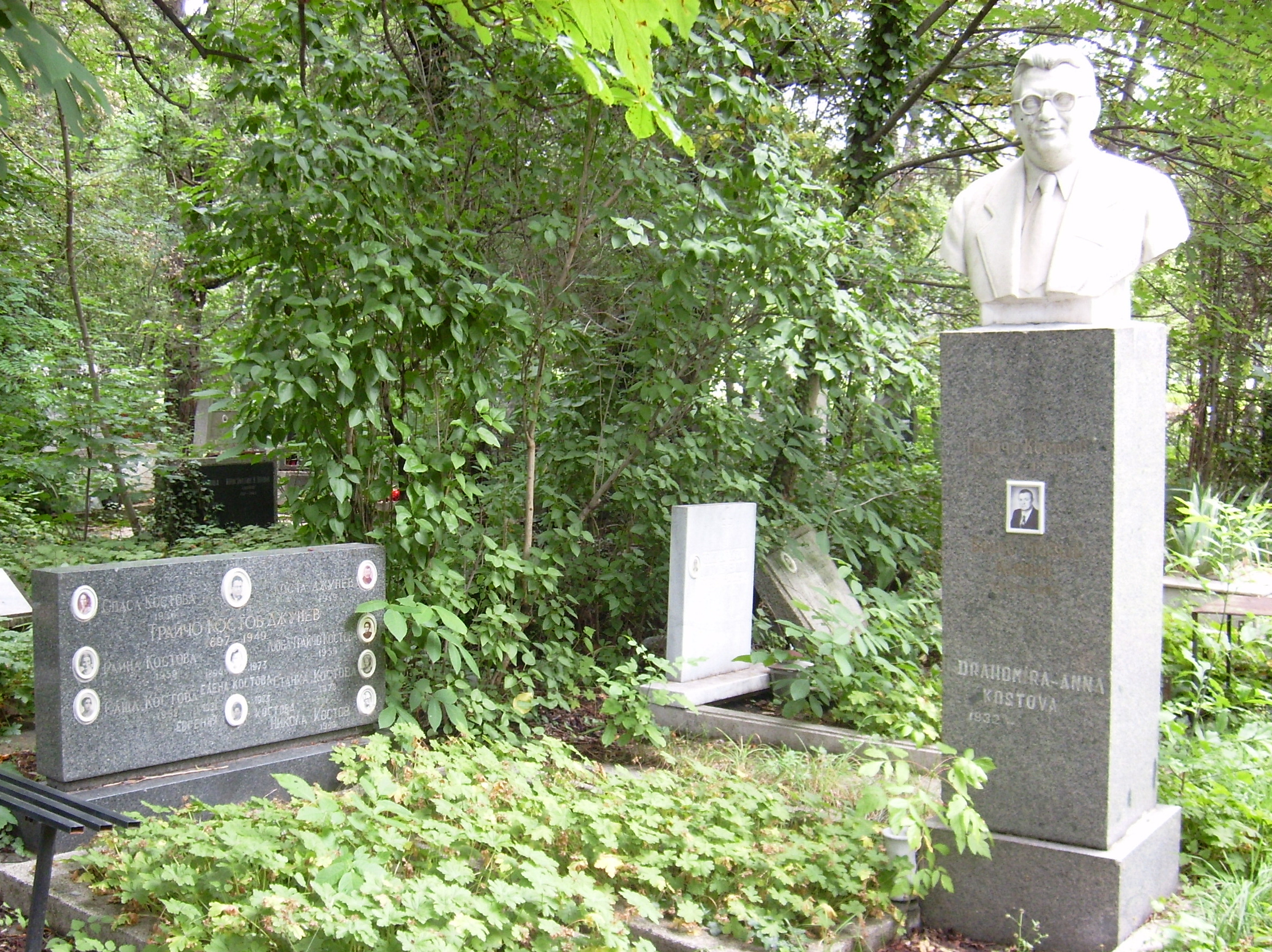
Traycho Kostov's Grave in Sofia Central Cemetery

== References in popular culture ==
The trial of Kostov is mentioned in passing in chapter 3 of In the First Circle by Aleksandr Solzhenitsyn, as a "crude judicial farce" followed by a "sham recantation, allegedly written by Kostov," which Lev Rubin is ashamed to mention to his German fellow-prisoners on Christmas Eve when they ask him for information on recent events in the news.

== See also ==
- Slánský trial
- László Rajk
- Lucrețiu Pătrășcanu
