= Nikola Vaptsarov =

Bulgarian poet and communist (1909–1942)

- Никола Вапцаров
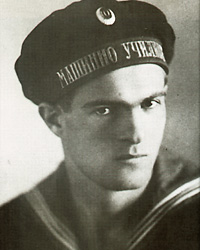
- Vaptsarov during his time in the Varna Naval Machinery School
- Born: 7 December 1909; Bansko, Ottoman Empire
- Died: 23 July 1942 (aged 32); Sofia, Bulgaria
- Citizenship: Bulgarian
- Occupations: poet, activist of the communist resistance
- Writing career
- Notable work: Motor Songs

Nikola Yonkov Vaptsarov (Bulgarian: Никола Йонков Вапцаров; Macedonian: Никола Јонков Вапцаров, romanized: Nikola Jonkov Vapcarov; 7 December 1909 – 23 July 1942) was a Bulgarian poet and Communist Party activist. He worked most of his life as a machinist, and wrote in his spare time. He published the poetry book, Motor Songs.

In the latter part of his life, as a Macedonian nationalist, he was the driving force of the Macedonian Literary Circle until World War II, when it was disbanded and its attempts to awaken Macedonian identity were abandoned. Vaptsarov joined the resistance movement and, because of his subversive activities in favor of the Soviet Union and against the Bulgarian government and the German troops in Bulgaria, he was arrested, then tried, sentenced and executed the same day.

== Life ==
Vaptsarov was born in Bansko (then in the Ottoman Empire, today in southwestern Bulgaria), in 1909 into a mixed Bulgarian Exarchist-Protestant family. His father was a participant in the anti-Ottoman struggles and member of the Internal Macedonian Revolutionary Organization (IMRO); his mother was educated at the American College of Samokov and worked as a teacher.

Vaptsarov was trained as a machine engineer at the Naval Machinery School, which was later named after him, in Varna. His first service was on the Drazki torpedo boat. In this period, he embraced Marxism and spread the communist ideology during the 1930s. In April and May 1932, Vaptsarov visited Istanbul, Famagusta, Alexandria, Beirut, Port Said, and Haifa as a crew member of the Burgas vessel. In 1934, he joined the Bulgarian Communist Party.

Later, Vaptsarov went to work in a factory in the village of Kocherinovo, at first as a stoker and eventually as a mechanic. He was elected chairman of the association protecting worker rights in the factory. During this time, Vaptsarov was devoted to his talent and spent his free time writing and organizing amateur theater pieces. He was fired after a technical failure in 1936. This forced him to move to Sofia, where he worked for the state railway service and the municipal incinerating furnace. He continued writing, and a number of newspapers published his poems. He won a poetry contest with his poem titled "Romantika".

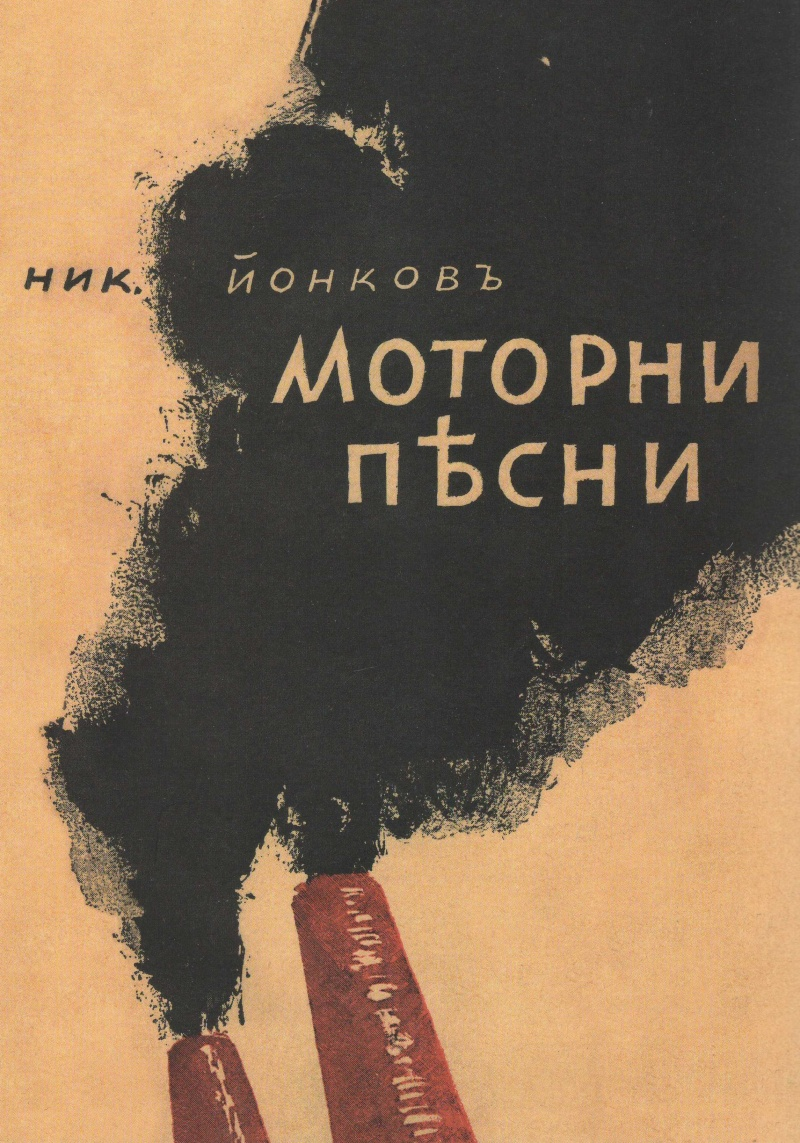
The cover of Motor Songs.

In the late 1930s, Vaptsarov co-founded and directed the procommunist Macedonian Literary Circle, which promoted the idea of a Macedonian nation and language. According to him their aim was to analyse linguistic idioms, folklore, customs in order to stimulate Macedonian literature and to nurture revolutionary romanticism related to the IMRO as part of an artistic realism. Vaptsarov asserted that they needed to affirm the Macedonians as a distinct people in front of the world. He continued, however, writing only in standard Bulgarian. His only published poetry collection is Motor Songs (Motorni pesni, 1940). According to Canadian-Macedonian historian Andrew Rossos, the cycle "Songs for the Fatherland" in the collection attests to his Macedonian national consciousness.

At the end of 1940, he participated in the so-called "Sobolev action," gathering signatures for a pact of friendship between Bulgaria and the Soviet Union. As a result of this illegal action, he was arrested and interned in the village of Godech.

In September 1940, he enthusiastically welcomed the news of the return of Southern Dobrudja to Bulgaria, while in the Spring of 1941, after the invasion of Macedonia by Bulgarian troops, he declared himself as a Bulgarian in police investigation papers. The Macedonian Literary Circle disbanded itself in the spring of 1941, and its attempts to awaken Macedonian identity were abandoned.

After the German invasion of the Soviet Union in the Summer of 1941, Vaptsarov got involved with the Central Military Committee of the Bulgarian Communist Party. He contacted the Soviet agent Tsvyatko Radoinov, who had illegally entered the country at the head of several groups of communist saboteurs. Vaptsarov's task was to organize the supply of guns and documents for the Bulgarian resistance. According to the leader of the Internal Macedonian Revolutionary Organization Ivan Mihaylov, at that time Vaptsarov was also his trusted man.

He was arrested in March 1942. On 23 July 1942, he was sentenced to death and shot the same evening along with eleven other men.

== Legacy ==
Post-war Bulgarian communist authorities revered him as an activist and revolutionary poet, presenting his poetry collection as an example of proletarian literature. His work was also widely published in Soviet-bloc countries. In 1949, the Bulgarian Naval Academy was renamed Nikola Vaptsarov Naval Academy. In 1952, museums dedicated to Vaptsarov were opened in Bansko and Sofia. In 1953, he received posthumously the International Peace Award. His Selected Poems was published in London in the 1950s, by Lawrence & Wishart, translated into English with a foreword by British poet Peter Tempest. Vaptsarov Peak in eastern Livingston Island, Antarctica, is named after the famous Bulgarian poet. Vaptsarov's childhood home in Bansko and residence in Sofia are both museums. In Bulgaria, a prosecution office, journalists and social activists proposed a repeal of his death sentence.

In 1954, Macedonian students at the Pedagogical Institute in Dupnitsa and Sofia protested against the classification of Vaptsarov as Bulgarian and accused Bulgarian leaders of Macedonian origin of abandoning their heritage. Similar demands arose among students and teachers in Sandanski, which led to a state investigation and expelling of a teacher, and a Communist Party campaign for indoctrination on the Macedonian Question.

In August 1977, the People's Republic of Bulgaria sent a diplomatic note to the Socialist Federal Republic of Yugoslavia, protesting against the exploitation of his image in the Yugoslav media when a documentary about the "Macedonian revolutionary and poet" was broadcast on the first channel of Belgrade television. BCP's leadership condemned such cases as "crude attempts by the Yugoslav side to appropriate the work and image of the Bulgarian poet and revolutionary Nikola Yonkov Vaptsarov and to distort the historical truth…" The newspaper of the Union of Bulgarian Writers, Literary Front, was called upon to reject the "Yugoslav forgeries" with an article. In 1977, the Secretariat of the Central Committee of the Bulgarian Communist Party began organizing the "Vaptsarov Literary Days", which were to be held every two years in Bansko. On the anniversary, the Union of Writers introduced the "Vaptsarov Prize". The organizers of the Struga Poetry Festival in the Socialist Republic of Macedonia announced the celebration of the "Macedonian poet" in the official program for 1979. In response, the Union of Bulgarian Writers issued a declaration against the "Macedonization" of the "Bulgarian poet", which led to the refusal of Czechoslovak, Polish, Cuban, East German and Soviet poets to participate in the festival. The poet's brother, Boris Vaptsarov, a member of BCP's leadership, forbade Yugoslav Macedonians from celebrating the anniversary. The Bulgarian Academy of Sciences excessively published papers dedicated to the poet's work, as well as documents and memoirs relating to him. An international scientific seminar on Vaptsarov was also held in Sofia, while literary festivals were organized in Blagoevgrad and other cities. In SR Macedonia, translations in Macedonian of his poetry were published, and he was claimed as an ethnic Macedonian. The Union of Bulgarian Writers condemned the Macedonian authorities and asserted his Bulgarian ethnicity.

His 1938 speech where he asserted that the Macedonians were a distinct people was hidden after 1956 from the public. It did not resurface in Bulgaria until 1995 but in a transcript. Left-wing activists continued to hide the original until 2002. It was only when they handed over parts of the Communist archive to the State Historical Archive that it became clear that the transcript from 1995 has been partially manipulated. In the manipulated version, the text included a claim that Macedonians have Bulgarian identity and would reject unification with FNR Yugoslavia, a state which did not exist or was even planned in 1938.

Vaptsarov is revered in North Macedonia. On 30 October 2022, an office of a cultural club of ethnic Macedonians in Bulgaria was officially opened under the name "Nikola Vapcarov" in Blagoevgrad. On 4 February 2023, the club was subjected to vandalism. On 7 February 2023, members of the club submitted an application to register as an association with the same name, but the registration was denied by the authorities. In August 2023 the club was closed after the Appellation Court in Sofia officially rejected the appeal.

According to slavist Jolanta Sujecka: "(...) Vapcarov/Vaptsarov is part of Bulgarian literature, and not just because of the Bulgarian language of his poems. The Bulgarian dimension of his identity as well as the Macedonian and universal – international dimensions are part of his multi-layer consciousness."
