= Veni Markovski =

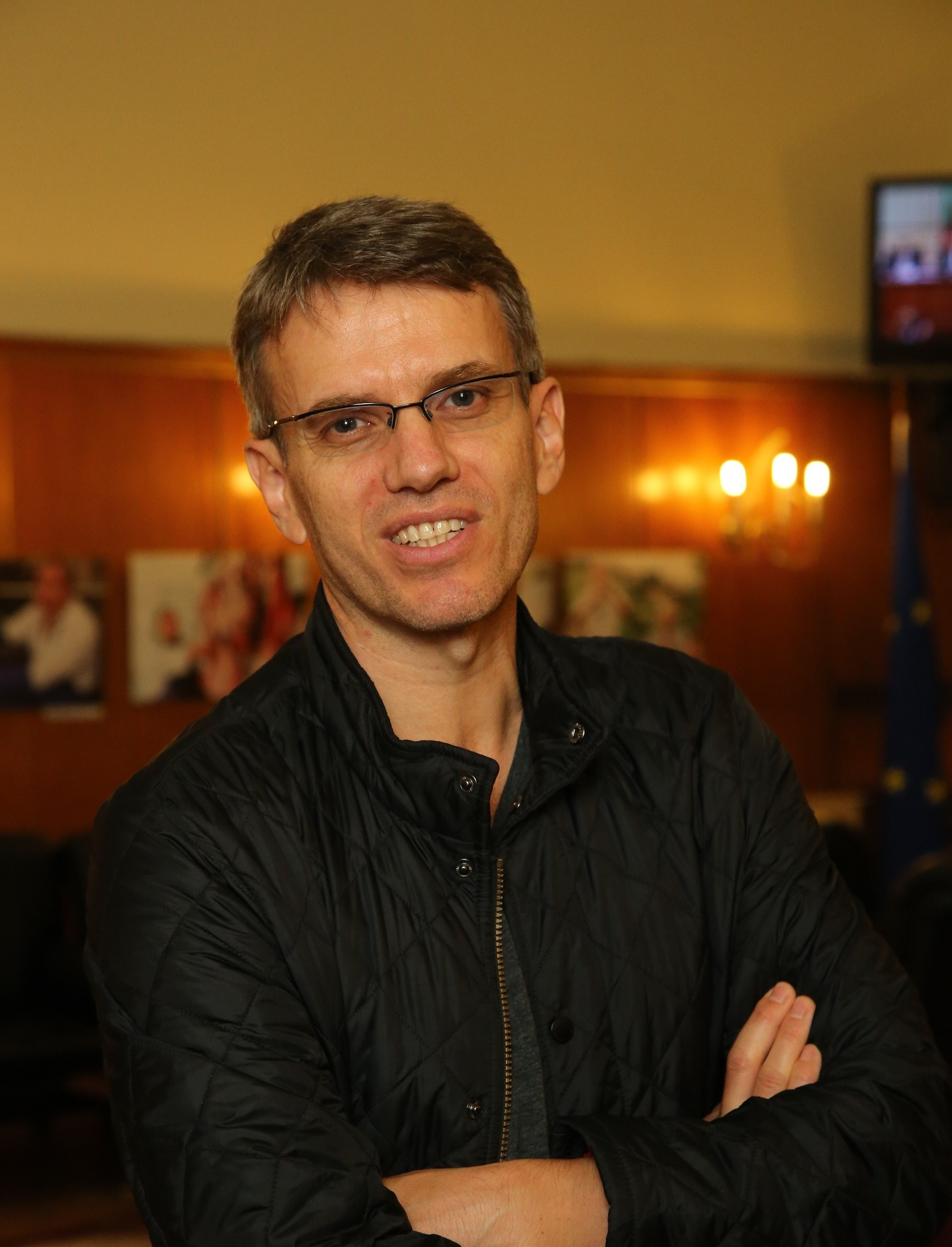
- September 25, 2015, Sofia, Bulgaria
- Born: 3 April 1968 (age 58); Skopje, SFRY (present-day North Macedonia)
- Occupations: Internet, President of ISOC-Bulgaria
- Parent: Mile Markovski

Veni Milanov Markovski is ICANN's Vice-President for UN engagement, based in New York. Originally a Bulgarian Internet entrepreneur, who co-founded BOL.BG, the first commercial Bulgarian Internet service provider in the capital Sofia, he went on to become a regional advocate for Free and Open-Source Software, before becoming global Internet governance expert and author.

== Internet in Bulgaria ==
Markovski first came into contact with the Internet in September 1990, by becoming one of the first system operators of a Bulletin Board System, part of FidoNet in Sofia, Bulgaria. In 1993 he co-founded, and was CEO until 2002, of bol.bg, the first Internet service provider in Sofia, and second overall in the country, after the Moscow-based private network GlasNet. In 1995 Markovski co-founded the Internet Society of Bulgaria – a non-profit think tank, promoting Internet usage and digital rights in Bulgaria, chartered by the global Internet Society. In 2000, he was the chair of the ICANN Membership Implementation Task Force for Eastern Europe. From March 2002 to January 2012, Markovski was chairman of the IT advisory committee to the Bulgarian President Georgi Parvanov. In 2009, in this role, Markovski spoke at the International Conference on Cyber Security (ICCS) in NYC, saying "In many countries cyber crime is not a crime." From 2006 until 2009, Markovski was senior adviser on international projects to the chairman of Bulgarian State Agency for IT and Communications to the Council of Ministers. Markovski was a member of the Bulgarian delegation to the World Summit on Information Society (WSIS) in 2003 and 2005.

== Free and Open-Source Software ==
Markovski became an advocate of Free and Open-Source Software (FOSS), and in December 2003 is quoted in the New York Times about how he had successfully lobbied the UNDP to support its use. In 2004 the Internet Society of Bulgaria, under Markovski's leadership supported Bulgarian MPs filing monopoly complaints against Microsoft, particularly for its use in e-government, and collaborated with the UNDP to launch a program to promote the use of FOSS in municipal e-government initiatives across Southeastern Europe.

== Global Internet Policy ==
As head of the Internet Society of Bulgaria, in 2002 Markovski began regularly participating in ITU-related events. He was also elected to the Board of Trustees of the Internet Society, a position he held until 2007. During this time the board oversaw the Internet Society's acquisition of the .org top level domain, and the launch of the Public Interest Registry.

At the same time, from June 2003 – December 2006, Markovski was also elected to the board of the Internet Corporation for Assigned Names and Numbers (ICANN), and also served on board of the CPSR from 2003–2005. In 2004 he was among the signatories of the Berlin Declaration on Collectively Managed Online Rights at the Wizards of OS conference.

In 2007, Markovski was hired by ICANN as regional manager for Russia, Eastern Europe, and the CIS. During this period he facilitated the launch of the .рф ccTLD, the first Cyrillic implementation of the Internationalizing Domain Names in Applications (IDNA) system. In 2012, he was promoted to VP, Stakeholder Engagement for the same region.

In 2014, Markovski was promoted to ICANN's VP, Global Stakeholder Engagement, working out of the United Nations in New York City, responsible for relations with the UN, UN agencies, and the permanent missions to the UN. He participated in the negotiations of the WSIS+10 Review in 2015, and in December that year addressed the UN General Assembly.

== Media and recognition ==
Markovski has been covered by international and national media for his work on internet governance and disinformation policy. In 2012 he was quoted by Reuters in reporting on United Nations telecommunications treaty negotiations. In 2018 the European Commission appointed him to its High-Level Expert Group on Fake News and Online Disinformation; Bulgarian National Television reported on the appointment. In 2022 TheMayor.eu published an interview discussing misinformation and responsible journalism.

== Education ==
Markovski graduated from Sofia University «St. Kliment Ohridski» with a Master of Law degree from its Law Faculty (1997).

== Publications ==
- Markovski, Veni (2018). Caught in the Net. Sofia University Press. ISBN 978-954-07-4488-9.
