= Vojnica =

Vojnica Vojnica
- Village
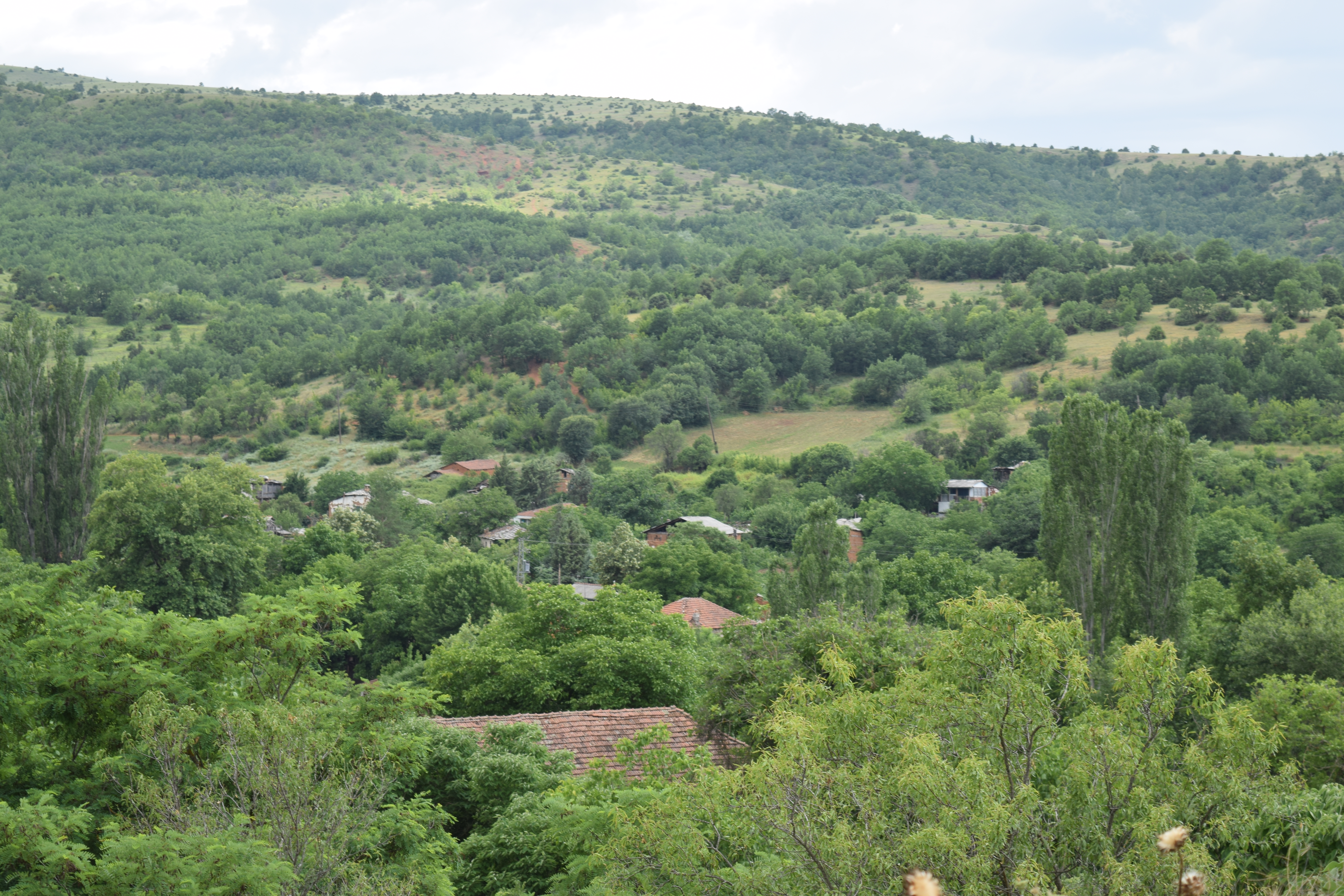

- Location within North Macedonia
- Coordinates: 41°37′N 21°42′E
- Country: North Macedonia
- Region: Vardar
- Municipality: Čaška

Population (2021)
  - Total: 11
- Time zone: UTC+1 (CET)
  - Summer (DST): UTC+2 (CEST)
- Car plates: VE
- Website: .

Vojnica (Macedonian: Vojnica) is a village in the municipality of Čaška, North Macedonia.

== Name ==
The village is known as Vojnicë in Albanian.

== Demographics ==
According to the 2021 census, the village had a total of 11 inhabitants. Ethnic groups in the village include:

- Macedonians 4
- Albanians 1
- Persons for whom data are taken from admin. sources 5
- Others 1

Year	Macedonian	Albanian	Turks	Romani	Aromanians	Serbs	Bosniaks	Others	Total
2002	32	...	...	...	...	...	...	...	32
2021	4	1	...	...	...	...	...	6	11
