= Malina Popivanova =

Macedonian communist (1902–1954)

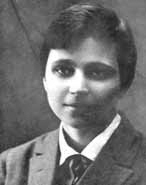
Malina Popivanova while she was in school

Malina Popivanova (April 7, 1902, Kočani, Ottoman Empire – July 19, 1954, Tyumen, USSR) was a prominent Macedonian communist.

== Personal life ==
Popivanova joined the revolutionary movement when she was very young and still in school. In 1919, she was arrested by the Bulgarian police during demonstrations in Sofia. Her parents and brothers, Ivan and Ceko Popivanov, were also arrested for participating in the same demonstration.

She was accepted into the League of Communists of Yugoslavia in 1920, in the city of Belgrade. She remained there until 1921 and pursued studies in the field of pharmacology. She moved to the city of Skopje from 1921 to 1924, and was an active member of the Cultural and Artistic Association, also known as "Abrasevic".

In the autumn of 1924, she moved to the USSR for schooling under the order of the League of Communists of Yugoslavia, and became the first Macedonian to graduate from Ia. M. Sverdlov Communist University in 1928.

== Career ==
In order to deal with the factional fighting in the Yugoslav Communist Party, the Comintern in the spring of 1928 sent more reliable cadres to Yugoslavia, including Popivanova. She first got a job working in Zagreb, then in Dalmatia, which was the center of the left faction in the League of Communists of Yugoslavia.

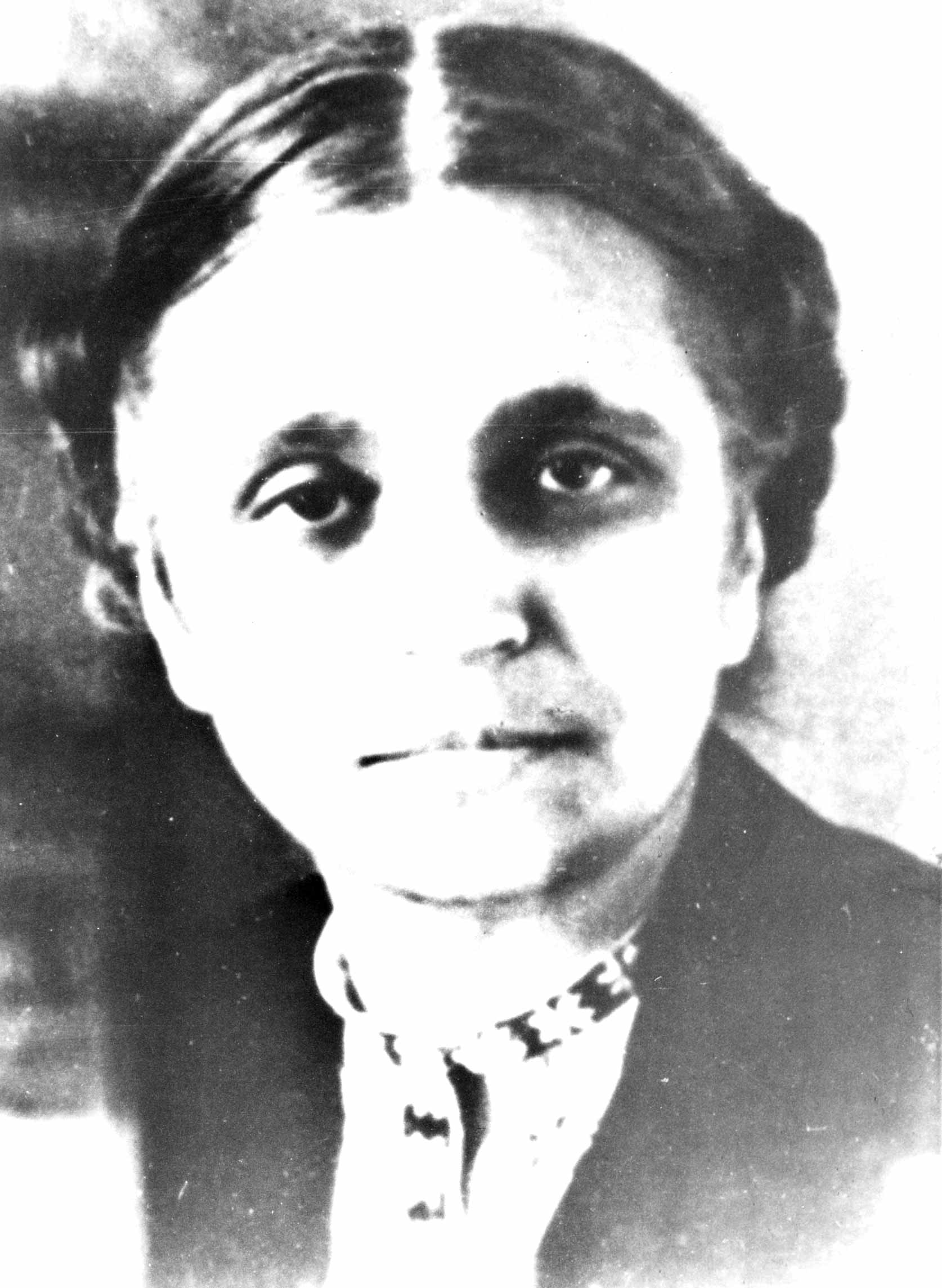
Malina Popivanova in 1940

In November 1928 Popivanova was a delegate to the Fourth Congress of the League of Communists of Yugoslavia in Dresden, along with Koco Racin At the Congress she was elected as a member of the Central Committee of the League of Communists of Yugoslavia, making her the first Macedonian with such a high position. After the Congress she returned to Zagreb, but due to illness in 1929 emigrated to the USSR where she lived and continued to operate under the name Elena Nikolaevna Galkina. In autumn 1929 she became a lecturer at the Communist University for National Minorities of the West (CONMW). At the end of 1929 she participated in dealing with opponents of the line of the Comintern in the Yugoslav CONMW sector. She taught at CONMW until December 1932, when she was sent to do organizational work, first in Moscow, and in October 1933 in the Omsk area. From there, in 1935 she was sent to Chervishevo in the Tyumenskaya area.

In 1937, at the height of Stalin's purges she was excluded from the Communist Party of the Soviet Union, and then arrested. In 1939 she was cleared and settled in Tyumen Oblast. There she worked as a teacher of history at the School of Pedagogy. She was later readmitted to the party. She died in 1954.

A November 28, 1963, decision of the Military Collegium of the Supreme Court of the USSR, she along with her father Stefan was politically rehabilitated and registered as Macedonian. This information was taken from a questionnaire that she filled out in 1932 when seeking papers from the Soviet Union, where in the "nationality" section she wrote - Macedonian.

Malina Popivanova Primary School in Kočani is named after her.
