= Venko Markovski =

Writer, partisan, and politician

- Венко Марковски
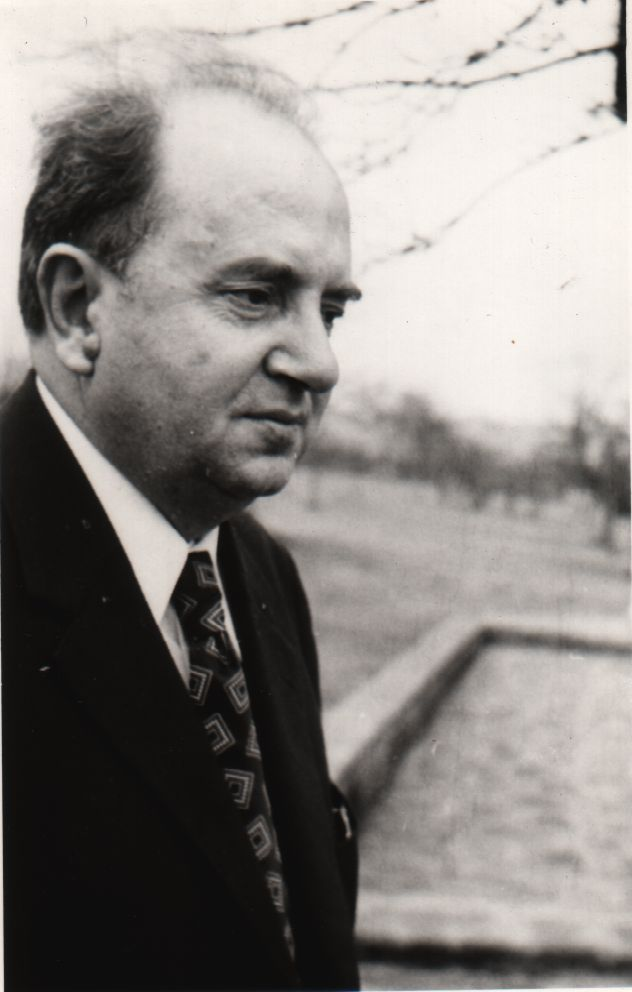
- Born: Veniyamin Milanov Toshev; March 5, 1915; Skopje, Kingdom of Serbia
- Died: January 7, 1988 (aged 72); Sofia, People's Republic of Bulgaria
- Citizenship: Yugoslav, Bulgarian
- Education: Sofia University
- Occupations: writer, poet, politician
- Writing career
- Language: Bulgarian, Macedonian
- Genres: poetry and history
- Notable works: People's Bitterness; The Fire; Blood is Thicker than Water; Goli Otok: The Island of Death

Venko Markovski (Bulgarian and Macedonian: Венко Марковски), born Veniyamin Milanov Toshev (Bulgarian: Вениямин Миланов Тошев, romanized: Veniyamin Milanov Toshev; Macedonian: Вениамин Миланов Тошев, romanized: Veniamin Milanov Tošev; March 5, 1915 – January 7, 1988), was a Bulgarian and Macedonian writer, poet, partisan and Communist politician. He participated in the Macedonian Literary Circle. Markovski contributed to the creation of a Macedonian literary language and alphabet. After the Tito–Stalin split in 1948, he sided with the Cominform, resulting in his imprisonment. After moving to Bulgaria, he became active in the Bulgarian political scene and changed his national views.

== Biography ==
Venko Markovski was born on March 5, 1915, in Skopje, Kingdom of Serbia, (present-day North Macedonia). Markovski completed his primary and secondary education in Skopje, later studying Slavic philology in Sofia University. Markovski was a member of the Macedonian Literary Group for the creation of a Macedonian literary language, founded in Skopje in 1931. In 1934, as a student of a Serbian gymnasium, he was arrested due to anti-state activity. In 1937, he moved to Sofia. He signed his first poems in the same year with the name Venko Markovski. In 1938, he published the first contemporary book written in unstandardized Macedonian language, Narodni bigori (People's Bitterness). He published another poetry collection named "Oginot" (The Fire). From 1938, he participated in the Macedonian Literary Circle in Sofia, embracing its Macedonism. He was a member of the group until 1941.

He became a member of the Bulgarian Communist Party (BCP) in 1941. During World War II, he participated in the anti-Axis movement in Bulgaria from 1941. In 1941 he was sent as a Communist activist to the concentration camp in Enikyoi by the Bulgarian police. Due to tuberculosis, with the intervention of Todor Pavlov, he was transferred to a sanatorium. Kuzman Josifovski Pitu and Petre Bogdanov Kočko rescued him from the sanatorium, transferring him together with his family to Vardar Macedonia in 1943, where he joined the Yugoslav partisan movement. He wrote many popular partisan march songs for the major battles in Yugoslavia. Markovski also became a member of the General Staff of the Macedonian Partisans. In 1944, he became a member of the Initiative Board for the Convocation of Anti-fascist Assembly for the National Liberation of Macedonia (ASNOM) and a delegate to the First Session of ASNOM.

In the period between 1944 and 1945, Markovski was present for three commissions for the codification of the Macedonian alphabet, was organized by ASNOM. During the sessions, he and Milka Balvanlieva-Đorđević suggested that everyone in Macedonia should be allowed to write the way they want, which is contrary to idea of codification. A conflict emerged between him and Blaže Koneski, with the latter advocating for the full adoption of the Serbian Cyrillic alphabet. The letter yer (ъ) divided Markovski and Koneski, as the former supported it, while the latter opposed it. In his memoirs, Markovski later depicted this conflict as a national one and that he was trying to save the alphabet from total Serbification. However, the stenographic transcripts of the debates show that this opposition was not nationally based, since he, as a future pro-Bulgarian and Bulgarian nationalist, familiarized the other members of the commission with the legacy of Krste Misirkov. The first commission's proposals were not accepted by ASNOM. In April 1945, the agitprop section of the Central Committee of the Communist Party of Yugoslavia (CPY) invited him, Koneski and Veselinka Malinska to Belgrade. According to the memoirs of Milovan Djilas, Koneski's proposals were accepted. Markovski regarded the alphabet as "too Serbified". On May 3, 1945, a new commission submitted an alphabet proposal that was accepted on the same day. This proposal was signed by ten people, including him and Koneski. Along with four other members of the commission, he had favored accepting yer but it was not accepted for the new alphabet.

He was a deputy of the assemblies of Socialist Federal Republic of Yugoslavia and Socialist Republic of Macedonia. In 1946, without a statutory procedure, Markovski was expelled from CPY allegedly because he revealed party secrets to a Bulgarian delegation. Per historian Ivo Banac, he remained principally loyal to BCP. In the same year, Markovski also published the play "The Native Floor", which was banned from being performed after its first performance. The critic Dimitar Mitrev accused Markovski of belittling the struggle of the Serbian people and their contribution to the World War II. According to a Cominformist source, the play addressed the "crimes of the Great Bulgarian as well as the Great Serbian fascists against the Macedonian people and was proscribed only because it did not fail to cite the crimes of the Serbian fascists."

After the Tito–Stalin split in 1948, Markovski openly supported the Cominform and was subsequently held at the internment camp in Idrizovo following Yugoslavia's expulsion from the Cominform. In 1950, he was imprisoned as a "traitor to the Macedonian people" and an "enemy of the state." The Yugoslav secret police UDBA also imprisoned members of his immediate family, and more than 20 close and distant relatives. He and his family were released in 1951. After his release, he remained loyal to the Soviet vision of socialism. Markovski viewed Nikita Khrushchev's acts to improve ties with Yugoslavia negatively. In January 1956, Markovski was once again imprisoned, this time serving a five-year hard labor sentence at the notorious labor camp on the island of Goli Otok in the Adriatic Sea under the name "Veniamin Milanov Toshev" for publishing—what the authorities considered—an anti-Titoist poem "Contemporary Paradoxes" in Serbo-Croatian and for his leanings towards the Soviet Union (see Informbiro).

After serving his full term, he was released in 1961 and allowed to return to Skopje, where he lived under virtual house arrest. In 1966, he was permitted to leave Yugoslavia. He moved to Bulgaria. Markovski soon became prominent on the Bulgarian political scene and began publishing in Bulgarian. Many of his poems there were political and Bulgarian nationalist. Markovski continued to criticize Josip Broz Tito's regime in his writings and to assert the Bulgarian character of Macedonia. As a result, the Yugoslav authorities continued to regard him as an enemy that must be eliminated and even attempted unsuccessfully several times to have his anti-Yugoslav political and literary activities banned by the Bulgarian authorities. The Yugoslav press called him a subversive émigré Cominformist. Markovski suspected UDBA of orchestrating his son Mile's death in 1975, who died in a car crash in Sofia. Fearing for his safety, the Bulgarian authorities placed Markovski under their protection. Markovski became a member of the Bulgarian National Assembly. He was also a member of the Bulgarian Writers' Union and the Bulgarian Academy of Sciences (1979). Markovski was awarded the highest communist Bulgarian order, Hero of Bulgaria, in March 1985. Prior to his death, Markovski stated that the ethnic Macedonians and the Macedonian language are a creation of the Communist International and denied their existence. Markovski died on January 7, 1988, in Sofia at the age of 72.

== Works and views ==
Markovski had published works in both Bulgarian and Macedonian. He wrote several poetry collections, including Partizani (Partisans) and Robii (Imprisonments), in which he glorified communism, partisan struggle, and Tito. After moving to Bulgaria, he supported the Bulgarian historiography's stance on the Macedonian Question. In the early 1970s, he advovated for the reintroduction of the yat and the big yus in the Bulgarian alphabet. In his 1981 book Blood is Thicker than Water, he apologized for his participation in SR Macedonia and declared Bulgarian identity. Bulgarian communist leader Todor Zhivkov convinced him to write the book after the publication of the History of the Macedonian People by the Institute of National History in Skopje. Markovski accused Macedonian historians of making forgeries. He denounced the Macedonian national identity as a Serbian and Yugoslav forgery.

In his 1984 book Goli Otok: The Island of Death in English, he described his experience in Goli Otok and the treatment of prisoners there. He also argued that Macedonian identity was a Bulgarian regionalism. In his outlook, he ended up being anti-Titoist, anti-Serb, and pro-Stalin. Markovski also wrote polemical anti-Yugoslav texts.

His poetry in Macedonian was criticized by the Bulgarian anti-communist dissident of the first years after the Second World War, Trifon Kunev, with an article in his newspaper column "Small and small like little camels", entitled "The small poems of a small poet", where his poems are described as anti-Bulgarian and created for political propaganda purposes, and his appointment to the state writers' union by the communist functionary Todor Pavlov was condemned.

Markovski wrote poems glorifying historical figures of the Macedonian and Bulgarian past "who safeguarded Bulgar [sic] nationhood." One of his poems, on the Gemidzii, was about Pavel Shatev, while another poem glorified the Ilinden uprising as a movement of the people of Lower Bulgaria.

== Legacy ==
His wife was Filimena and he had two children, among them the writer Mile Markovski (1939–1975) and piano teacher Sultana. His two grandsons are the Internet pioneer Veni Markovski and journalist Igor Markovski.

By the late 1990s, writers and journalists aligned with VMRO-DPMNE denounced Koneski as a "Serbian agent" and glorified Markovski. Throughout his life, Markovski was a proponent of close Macedonian-Bulgarian cultural and political ties. After North Macedonia's independence, he was rehabilitated in 2006 and historians in public forums have stated that he had made a major contribution to the Macedonian national cause, despite his pro-Bulgarian views.

== Bibliography ==
=== In Macedonian ===
- Народни бигори (People's Bitterness, 1938)
- Огинот (The Fire, 1938)
- Илинден (Ilinden, 1940)
- Луња (Blizzard, 1940)
- Чудна е Македонија (Macedonia is strange, 1940)
- Робии (Prisons, 1942)
- Елегии (Elegies)
- Гоце (Goce)
- Гламји
- Климе (Klime, 1945)
- Над пламнати бездни (Over flaming abyses)
- Сказна за резбарот (Tale about the woodcarver)
- Голи Оток (Goli Otok, 2009)

=== In Bulgarian ===
- Орлицата (The Eagless, 1941)
- Истината е жестока (Truth is Cruel, 1968)
- Леганда за Гоце (A legend about Gotse, 1968), a play
- Кръвта вода не става (Blood is Thicker than Water, 1981)
- Предания заветни (Saga of Testaments, 1978, also published in Russian)
- Писмо до другарката (Letter to My Love, 1979)
- Съдбовни мъченици (Fateful Martyrs, 1981), sonnet crown
- Бунтовни вощеници (Rebellious Candles, 1983), sonnet crown
- Вековни върволици (Ancient processions, 1984), sonnet crown

=== in English ===
- Goli Otok: The Island of Death (1984)
