= List of writers by name: D =

The following is a List of writers by name whose last names begin with D:

Abbreviations: ch = children's; d = drama, screenwriting; f = fiction; nf = non-fiction; p = poetry, song lyrics

== Da ==
- Hamid Dabashi (born 1951, Iran/US, nf)
- David Dabydeen (born 1955, Guyana/England, f/p/nf)
- Simon Dach (1605–1659, Germany, p)
- Luísa Dacosta (1927–2015, Portugal, f)
- Charlotte Dacre (1771 or 1772–1825, England, f)
- Sigfús Daðason (1928–1996, Iceland, p/nf)
- Aneta Dadeshkeliani (1872–1922, Russian E/USSR, p)
- Nino Dadeshkeliani (1890–1931, Russian E/France, nf)
- Debbie Dadey (born 1959, US, ch)
- Bernard Binlin Dadié (1916–2019, Ivory Coast, f/d/p)
- Catrin Dafydd (born c. 1982, Wales, f/d)
- Edward Dafydd (died 1690, Wales, p)
- Fflur Dafydd (born 1978, Wales, f/p)
- Philip Dafydd (c. 1732 – c. 1814, Wales, nf/p)
- Vilborg Dagbjartsdóttir (1930–2021, p)
- Stig Dagerman (1923–1954, Sweden, f/d/p)
- Alfonso Gumucio Dagron (Bolivia, p/nf)
- Marianna Debes Dahl (born 1947, Faroe Is, f/nf/ch)
- Roald Dahl (1916–1990, Wales/England, ch)
- Tessa Dahl (born 1957, England, f/ch)
- Tor Edvin Dahl (born 1943, Norway, f/ch/nf)
- Gro Dahle (born 1962, Norway, p/ch)
- Felix Dahn (1834–1912, Germany, nf/p)
- Dai Houying (戴厚英, 1938–1996, China, f)
- Dai Sijie (戴思杰, born 1954, China/France, f)
- Dai Wangshu (戴望舒, 1905–1950, China, p/nf)
- Dai Zhen (戴震, 1724–1727, China, nf)
- Janet Dailey (1944–2013, US, f)
- Claudia Dain (1956–2021, US, f)
- Johan Daisne (1912–1978, Belgium, p/f/d)
- Jean Daive (born 1941, France, p/f)
- Ivan Đaja (1884–1957, France/Yugoslavia, nf)
- William Dakins (died 1607, England, nf)
- John Dalberg-Acton, 1st Baron Acton (1832–1902, England, nf)
- Andrew Dalby (born 1947, England, nf)
- Celia Dale (1912–2011, England, f/nf)
- Marguerite Dale (1883–1963, Australia, d)
- Penny Dale (born 1954, England, ch)
- Ruth Jean Dale (1939–2022, US, f), pseudonym Lee Duran
- Thomas Dale (1797–1870, p/nf)
- Brian Daley (1947–1996, US, f/d)
- Victor Daley (1858–1905, Ireland/Australia, p)
- Alice Dalgliesh (1893–1979, Trinidad & Tobago/US, ch)
- Olof von Dalin (1708–1763, Sweden, p/nf)
- Jose Dalisay, Jr. (born 1954, Philippines, f/p/d)
- Robert Charles Dallas (1754–1824, Jamaica/England, nf)
- John Dalmas (1926–2017, US, f)
- Jurij Dalmatin (c. 1547–1589, Habsburg E, nf)
- György Dalos (born 1943, Hungary/Germany, f/nf)
- Dalpatram (1820–1898, Mughal Empire/India, p)
- Blanche d'Alpuget (born 1944, Australia, f/nf)
- Annie Dalton (born 1948, England, ch)
- Roque Dalton (1935–1975, El Salvador, p/nf/f)
- Kathleen Dalziel (1881–1969, S Africa/Australia, p)
- Léon Damas (1912–1978, France, nf/p)
- Antonio Damasio (born 1944, Portugal/US, nf)
- Hanna Damasio (living, Portugal/US, nf)
- Anne Seymour Damer (1748–1828, England, f)
- Peter Damian (c. 1007–1072/1073, Italy, nf)
- Ratomir Damjanović (born 1945, Yugoslavia/Serbia, f/nf)
- Nana Awere Damoah (born 1975, Ghana, nf/f)
- Sapardi Djoko Damono (1940–2020, Indonesia, p)
- William Dampier (1651–1715, England, nf)
- Kazuo Dan (檀一雄, 1912–1976, Japan, f/p)
- Oniroku Dan (団鬼六, 1931–2011, Japan, f)
- William Danby (1752–1833, England, nf)
- Antoine Danchet (1671–1748, France, d/p)
- Clemence Dane (1888–1965, England, f/d), pseudonym of Winifred Ashton
- Simin Daneshvar (1921–2012, Iran, f/nf)
- Tsitsi Dangarembga (born 1959, S Rhodesia/Zimbabwe, f/d)
- Achmat Dangor (1948–2020, S Africa, f/p/nf)
- Anna Dániel (1908–2003, Austria-Hungary/Hungary, f/ch/nf)
- Frank Daniel (1926–1996, Czechoslovakia/US, d)
- George Daniel (1789–1864, England, p/d/nf)
- Robert Mackenzie Daniel (1813–1847, Scotland/Jersey, f/nf)
- Samuel Daniel (1562–1619, England, p/d/nf)
- William Barker Daniel (1754–1833, England, nf)
- David Scott Daniell (1906–1965, England, f/nf/ch)
- David Daniels (1933–2008, US, p)
- Jeffrey Daniels (living, US, p)
- Sarah Daniels (born 1966, England, d)
- Peter Danielson (fl. late 1990s, US, ch), pseudonym of multiple authors
- Tage Danielsson (1928–1985, Sweden, nf/p)
- Erich von Däniken (1935–2026, Switzerland, nf)
- Danilo II, Serbian Archbishop (fl. 14th c., Serbia, nf)
- Danilo's anonymous pupil (fl. 14th c., Serbia, nf)
- Jack Dann (born 1945, US, f/nf/p)
- Gabriele D'Annunzio (1863–1938, Italy, p/d/f/nf)
- Milovan Danojlić (1937–2022, Yugoslavia/Serbia, f/p)
- J. B. Danquah (1895–1965, Gold Coast/Ghana, nf/d)
- Mabel Dove Danquah (1905–1984, Gold Coast/Ghana, nf/f/p)
- Meri Nana-Ama Danquah (born 1967, Ghana/US, nf)
- Júlio Dantas (1876–1962, Portugal, p/nf/d)
- Dante Alighieri (c. 1265–1321, Italy, p/nf)
- Edwidge Danticat (born 1969, Haiti/US, f)
- Charles Dantzig (born 1961, France, nf/p)
- Rudi van Dantzig (1933–2012, Netherlands, nf)
- Alicia D'Anvers (1668–1725, England, p)
- Paula Danziger (1944–2004, US, ch)
- Bernadette Sanou Dao (born 1952, French Sudan/Burkina Faso, p/f/ch)
- Ahmad Daoud (born 1942, Syria, nf)
- Kamel Daoud (born 1970, Algeria, nf/f)
- Mohammed Daoud (1901–1984, Morocco, nf)
- Zakya Daoud (born 1937, France, nf)
- John Nelson Darby (1800–1882, England, nf)
- Emma Darcy (married couple, 1936–1995 and 1940–2020, Australia, f)
- Hugh Antoine d'Arcy (1843–1925, France/US, p/d)
- Olivier Dard (born 1963, France, f/nf)
- Abi Daré (living, Nigeria/England, f)
- Bill Dare (living, England, d)
- Brahim Dargouthi (born 1955, Tunisia, f)
- Rubén Darío (1867–1916, Nicaragua, p/nf)
- Eleanor Dark (1901–1985, Australia, f)
- Jason Dark (born 1945, Germany, f), pseudonym of Helmut Rellergerd
- Amma Darko (born 1956, Gold Coast/Ghana, f)
- Lawrence Darmani (living, Ghana, f/p)
- Iris Rainer Dart (born 1944, US, f/d)
- F. J. Harvey Darton (1878–1936, England, nf)
- Keki N. Daruwalla (born 1937, India, p/f)
- József Darvas (1912–1973, Hungary, nf)
- Ali Ashraf Darvishian (1941–2017, Iran, f/nf)
- Bernard Darwin (1876–1961, England, nf)
- Charles Darwin (1809–1882, England, nf)
- Charles Galton Darwin (1887–1962, England, nf)
- Emma Darwin (born 1964, England, f)
- Erasmus Darwin (1731–1802, England, nf/p)
- Florence Henrietta Darwin (1864–1920, England, d)
- Mahmoud Darwish (1941–2008, Palestine/US, p)
- Elizabeth Daryush (1887–1977, England, p)
- Guru Amar Das (1479–1574, Delhi Sultanate/Mughal E, nf)
- Guru Ram Das (1534–1581, Mughal E, p)
- Gyandil Das (1821–1883, Nepal, p)
- Jibanananda Das (1899–1954, India, p/nf/f)
- Manoj Das (1934–2021, India, nf)
- George Webbe Dasent (1817–1896, England, nf)
- Rana Dasgupta (born 1971, England, f/nf)
- James Dashner (born 1972, US, ch)
- Petter Dass (c. 1647–1707, Norway, p)
- Dietmar Dath (born 1970, Germany, p/d/f/nf)
- Alphonse Daudet (1840–1897, France, f)
- Philippe Daudy (1925–1994, France/England, f/nf)
- Mikalojus Daukša (1527–1613, Grand Duchy of Lithuania, nf)
- René Daumal (1908–1944, France, f/nf/p)
- Jean Daurat (1508–1588, France, p/nf)
- Max Dauthendey (1867–1918, Germany/Dutch East Indies, nf)
- William Davenant (1606–1668, England, p/d)
- Guy Davenport (1927–2005, US, nf)
- Robert Davenport (fl. 1623–1639, England, d)
- Selina Davenport (1777–1859, England, f)
- Oskar Davičo (1909–1989, Austrian E/Yugoslavia, f/p)
- Filip David (born 1940, Yugoslavia/Serbia, f/nf/d)
- David Davidar (born 1958, India, f/nf)
- Henriette Davidis (1801–1876, Germany, nf)
- Doru Davidovici (1945–1989, Romania, f/nf)
- Caroline Rhys Davids (1857–1942, England, nf)
- Alan Davidson (born 1943, England, ch)
- Alan Davidson (1924–2003, N Ireland/England, nf)
- Avram Davidson (1923–1993, US, f)
- Donald Davidson (1893–1968, US, p/nf)
- Hilda Ellis Davidson (1914–2006, England, nf)
- John Davidson (1857–1909, Scotland/England, p/d/f)
- Lionel Davidson (1922–2009, England, f)
- Lucretia Maria Davidson (1808–1825, US, p)
- MaryJanice Davidson (born 1969, US, f/nf/ch)
- Donald Davie (1922–1995, England, p/nf)
- Alan Davies (born 1951, US, p/nf)
- Aneirin Talfan Davies (1909–1980, Wales, p/nf)
- Caitlin Davies (born 1964, England, f/nf)
- Catherine Glyn Davies (1926–2007, Wales/England, nf)
- Deborah Kay Davies (living, Wales, p/f/nf)
- Edward Tegla Davies (1880–1967, Wales, nf/ch/f)
- Emily Davies (1830–1921, England, nf)
- Gareth Alban Davies (1926–2009, Wales/England, p/nf)
- Grahame Davies (born 1967, Wales, p/nf)
- Hugh Sykes Davies (1909–1984, England, p/f)
- Hunter Davies (born 1936, Scotland/England, nf/f)
- James Kitchener Davies (1902–1952, Wales, p/d)
- John Davies (c. 1565–1618, England, p)
- John Davies (c. 1567–1644, Wales, nf)
- John Davies (1569–1626, England, p/nf)
- John Cadvan Davies (1846–1923, Wales, p/nf)
- John Humphreys Davies (1871–1926, Wales, nf)
- Lewis Davies (1863–1951, Wales/England, nf)
- Linda Davies (living, USSR/England, f)
- Margaret Davies (c. 1700–1778 or 1785, Wales, p)
- Mary Davies (1846–1882, Wales, p)
- Michael Davies (1936–2004, England, nf)
- Paul B. Davies (living, England, d)
- Pennar Davies (1911–1996, Wales, p/f/nf)
- Peter Ho Davies (born 1966, England/US, f)
- Rhys Davies (1901–1978, Wales/England, f)
- Richard Davies (c. 1505–1581, Wales, nf)
- Richard Davies (1833–1937, Wales, p), pseudonym Mynyddog
- Robertson Davies (1913–1995, Canada, f/d/nf)
- Stephen Davies (born 1976, England, ch)
- T. Glynne Davies (1926–1988, Wales, p/f/nf)
- W. H. Davies (1871–1940, Wales/England, p)
- William Davies (born 1976, England, nf)
- Amparo Dávila (1928–2020, Mexico, f/p)
- Alexandru Davila (1862–1929, Romania, d/nf)
- Virgilio Dávila (1869–1943, Puerto Rico, p)
- Dan Davin (1913–1990, N Zealand, f/nf)
- Adelle Davis (1904–1974, US, nf)
- Beatrice Deloitte Davis (1909–1992, Australia, nf)
- Carol Anne Davis (born 1961, Scotland, f/ch)
- Dorothy Salisbury Davis (1916–2014, US, f)
- Jack Davis (1917–2000, Australia, d/p)
- John Davis (c. 1550–1605, England, nf)
- Jon Davis (born 1952, US, p/d)
- Lavinia R. Davis (1909–1961, US, ch/f), pseudonym Wendell Farmer
- Lindsey Davis (born 1949, England, f)
- Lydia Davis (born 1947, US, f/nf)
- Norma Davis (1905–1945, Australia, p)
- Rennie Davis (1940–2021, US, nf)
- Richard Harding Davis (1864–1916, US, f/nf/d)
- Terry Davis (born 1947, US, f)
- Thomas Davis (1804–1887, England nf/p)
- William Stearns Davis (1877–1930, US, nf/f)
- Ann Davison (1914–1992, England, nf)
- Edward Davison (1898–1970, Scotland, p/nf)
- Peter Davison (1928–2004, US, p/nf)
- Sigrún Davíðsdóttir (born 1955, Iceland/England, nf/f)
- Vilborg Davíðsdóttir (born 1965, Iceland, f/nf)
- Humphry Davy (1778–1829, England, nf)
- Denis Davydov (1784–1839, Russian E, p)
- Elizabeth Dawbarn (died 1839, England, nf)
- Bruce Dawe (1930–2020, Australia, p)
- Kwame Dawes (born 1962, Ghana, p/nf)
- Richard Dawkins (born 1941, Kenya/England, nf)
- Coningsby Dawson (1883–1959, England/Canada, f)
- Christopher Dawson (1889–1970, Wales/England, nf)
- Geralyn Dawson (living, US, f), also as Emily March
- Janet Dawson (born 1949, Australia, nf)
- Jennifer Dawson (1929–2000, England, f)
- Jill Dawson (born 1962, England, p/f)
- William James Dawson (1854–1928, England, nf)
- Dorothy Day (1897–1980, US, nf)
- Douglas Day (1932–2004, US, f/nf)
- James Wentworth Day (1899–1983, England, nf)
- Jeffery Day (1896–1918, England, p)
- John Day (1574 – c. 1638, England, d)
- Martin Day (born 1968, England, d/f)
- Sarah Day (born 1958, England/Australia, p)
- Thomas Day (1948–1989, England, nf)
- Cecil Day-Lewis (1904–1972, Ireland/England, p/f)
- Tamasin Day-Lewis (born 1953, England, nf)
- Dayaram (1777–1853, India, p)
- Gábor Dayka (1769–1796, Hungary, p)
- Osamu Dazai (太宰治, 1909–1948, Japan, f)
- Massimo d'Azeglio (1798–1866, Italy, f)

== Dc–Di ==
- Jean D'Costa (born 1937, Jamaica, ch)
- Valarie D'Elia (c. 1960–2024, US, nf)
- Shobhaa De (born 1948, India, f/nf)
- Lauro De Bosis (1901–1931, Italy, p/nf)
- Thomas De Koninck (1934–2026, Canada, nf)
- Suzanne de Nervèze (17th-century, France, f)
- William Frederick Deacon (1799–1845, England, f/nf)
- James Deahl (born 1945, Canada, p)
- Roger Deakin (1943–2006, England, nf)
- William Deakin (1913–2005, England, nf)
- Kit Dealtry (1872–1954, Australia/England, f), pseudonym of Kathleen Clarice Groom
- Dulcie Deamer (1890–1972, N Zealand/Australia, f/d/p)
- Louise Dean (living, England, f)
- Martin R. Dean (born 1955, Switzerland, f/nf)
- Pamela Dean (born 1953, US, f)
- Joel Deane (born 1969, Australia, f/nf
- Nick Dear (born 1955, England, d)
- Geoffrey Dearmer (1893–1996, England, p)
- Mabel Dearmer (1872–1915, England, f/d/ch)
- Percy Dearmer (1867–1936, England, p/nf)
- Terry Deary (born 1946, England, ch)
- Jeffery Deaver (born 1950, US, f)
- Thangam Debbonaire (born 1966, England, nf)
- Djamila Debèche (1926–2010, Algeria/France, f/nf)
- Aleš Debeljak (1961–2016, Yugoslavia/Slovenia, nf/p)
- Milan Dedinac (1902–1966, Serbia/Yugoslavia, p)
- John Dee (1527–1608 or 1609, England, nf)
- Denise Deegan (born 1952, England, f/d)
- Selim Al Deen (1949–2008, E Pakistan/Bangladesh, nf/p/f)
- Sophie Deen (born 1984, England, ch)
- Warwick Deeping (1877–1950, England, f)
- Kenneth S. Deffeyes (1931–2017, US, nf)
- Daniel Defoe (1660–1731, England, f/nf)
- Régine Deforges (1935–2014, France, f/nf)
- Madeline DeFrees (1919–2015, US, p/nf)
- Franz Josef Degenhardt (1931–2011, Germany, p/f)
- Lise Deharme (1898–1980, France, f)
- Richard Dehmel (1863–1920, Germany, p/nf/d)
- Paul Dehn (1912–1976, England, d)
- Jacek Dehnel (born 1980, Poland, p/d/nf)
- Michael Dei-Anang (1909–1977, Gold Coast/Ghana, f/d)
- Len Deighton (born 1929, England, f/nf)
- Draga Dejanović (1840–1871, Austrian E/Serbia, p/nf)
- Meindert DeJong (1906–1991, Netherlands/US, ch)
- Aagje Deken (1741–1804, Netherlands, p/nf/f)
- Thomas Dekker (1572–1641, England, d/nf)
- Milan Dekleva (born 1946, Yugoslavia/Slovenia, p/f)
- E. M. Delafield (1890–1943, England, f/nf/d)
- Edward J. Delaney (born 1957, US, f)
- Michael De-la-Noy (1934–2002, England, nf)
- Mary Delany (1700–1788, England, nf)
- Samuel R. Delany (born 1942, US, f/nf)
- Lucie Delarue-Mardrus (1874–1945, France, p/f/nf)
- Barbu Ștefănescu Delavrancea (1858–1918, Romania, nf/p/f)
- Sven Delblanc (1931–1992, Canada/Sweden, f/nf)
- R. F. Delderfield (1912–1972, England, f/d)
- Grazia Deledda (1871–1936, Italy, f)
- Philippe Delerm (born 1950, France, nf)
- Yanette Delétang-Tardif (1902–1976, France, p/f)
- Gilles Deleuze (1925–1995, France, nf)
- Santiago Martínez Delgado (1906–1954, Colombia, nf)
- Sahar Delijani (born 1983, Iran/US, f)
- Jacques Delille (1738–1813, France, p)
- Don DeLillo (born 1936, US, f/d/nf)
- Barbara Delinsky (born 1945, US, f)
- Esther Delisle (born 1954, Canada, nf)
- Ethel M. Dell (1881–1939, England, f), pseudonym of Ethel May Dell Savage
- Thomas Deloney (c. 1543–1600, England, f/p)
- Vine Deloria Jr. (1933–2005, US, nf)
- Lester del Rey (1915–1993, US, f/nf)
- Demetrius I of Georgia (c. 1093–1156, Georgia, p)
- Derenik Demirchian (1877–1956, Russian E/USSR, f/p/d)
- Democritus (c. 460 – c. 370 BCE, Greece, nf)
- Demosthenes (384–322 BCE, Greece, nf)
- Robert DeMott (born 1943, US, nf)
- Charlotte Louisa Hawkins Dempster (1835–1913, Scotland, f/nf)
- Roland T. Dempster (1910–1965, Liberia, f/nf/p)
- Elizabeth Denby (1894–1965, England, nf)
- Joolz Denby (born 1955, England, p/f)
- Zsófia Dénes (1885–1987, Hungary, f/nf)
- Marco Denevi (1922–1998, Argentina, f/nf)
- John Denham (c. 1614–1669, Ireland/England, p)
- Michael Denis (1729–1800, Germany/Austria, p/nf)
- Nelson Antonio Denis (born 1955, US, nf))
- Troy Denning (born 1958, US, f)
- C. J. Dennis (1876–1938, Australia, p/ch)
- Felix Dennis (1947–2014, England, p)
- George Dennis (1814–1898, England, nf)
- John Dennis (1658–1734, England, nf/d)
- Nigel Dennis (1912–1989, England, nf/d)
- Nicole Dennis-Benn (born 1982, Jamaica/US, f)
- Lester Dent (1904–1959, US, f), also as Kenneth Robeson
- Tory Dent (1958–2005, US, p/nf)
- Laurence Deonna (1937–2023, Switzerland, nf)
- René Depestre (born 1926, Haiti/Cuba, p/nf)
- Anna dePeyster (1944–2026, Scotland/Australia, f)
- David Dephy (born 1968, Georgia/US, p/f/nf)
- John Derbyshire (born 1945, England/US, nf)
- Tristan Derème (1889–1941, France, p/nf), pseudonym of Philippe Huc
- Jovan Deretić (1934–2002, Yugoslavia/Serbia, nf)
- Jovan I. Deretić (1939–2021, Yugoslavia/Serbia, nf)
- Robert Jones Derfel (1824–1905, Wales/England, p/nf)
- Enid Derham (1882–1941, Australia, p)
- Regina Derieva (1949–2013, Russia/Sweden, p/nf)
- August Derleth (1909–1971, US, f/p/nf)
- Thomas Dermody (1775–1802, Ireland/England, p)
- Maria Dermoût (1888–1962, Dutch East Indies/Netherlands, f)
- Paul Déroulède (1846–1914, France, p/d)
- Christopher Derrick (1921–2007, England, nf)
- Michael Derrick (1915–1961, England, nf)
- Samuel Derrick (1724–1769, Ireland/England, nf/d)
- Toi Derricotte (born 1941, US, p/nf)
- Jacques Derrida (1930–2004, Algeria/France, nf)
- Teki Dervishi (1943–2011, Yugoslavia/Kosovo, p/f/d)
- Lavinia Derwent (1909–1989, Scotland, nf/ch), pseudonym of Elizabeth Dodd
- Portia Dery (living, Ghana, ch/f/p)
- Tibor Déry (1894–1977, Hungary, f/nf, p)
- Anita Desai (born 1937, India, f)
- Kiran Desai (born 1971, India/US, f)
- Maryline Desbiolles (born 1959, France, f)
- Marceline Desbordes-Valmore (1786–1859, France, p/f)
- Émile Deschamps (1791–1871, France, p)
- Eustache Deschamps (1346–1406 or 1407, France, p)
- Anne Desclos (1907–1998, France, f/nf), pseudonym Pauline Réage
- Dhanashree Deshpande-Ganatra (born 1970, India, p)
- Purushottam Laxman Deshpande (1919–2000, India, f/d)
- Pip Desmond (living, N Zealand, nf)
- Vladan Desnica (1905–1967, Austria-Hungary/Yugoslavia, p/f)
- Robert Desnos (1900–1945, France, p), Holocaust victim
- Philippe Desportes (1546–1606, France, p)
- Sarah Dessen (born 1970, US, f)
- Georges Dessommes (1855–1929, US, p)
- Jean-Pierre Desthuilliers (1939–2013, France, p/nf)
- Bruno Destrée (1867–1919, Belgium, p/nf)
- Jessica Dettmann (living, Australia, f/d)
- Léon Deubel (1879–1913, France, p)
- João de Deus (1830–1896, Portugal, p)
- Babette Deutsch (1895–1982, US, p/nf/f)
- James Devaney (1890–1976, Australia, p/nf)
- Jean Devanny (1894–1962, N Zealand/Australia, f/nf)
- Catherine Deveny (born 1968, Australia, nf)
- Jude Deveraux (born 1947, US, f)
- Mary Deverell (1731–1805, England, nf)
- Ananda Devi (born 1957, Mauritius, f)
- Mahasweta Devi (1926–2016, India, f/nf)
- Laxmi Prasad Devkota (1909–1959, Nepal, p/d/f)
- Josie Dew (born 1966, England, nf)
- George E. Dewar (1891–1969, N Zealand, nf/p)
- Eileen Dewhurst (born 1929, England, f)
- William Dewsbury (c. 1621–1688, England, nf)
- Colin Dexter (1930–2017, England, f)
- Lodewijk van Deyssel (1864–1952, Netherlands, f/p/nf), pseudonym of Karel Joan Lodewijk Alberdingk Thijm
- Charles Dezobry (1798–1871, France, nf/f)
- Humayun Kabir Dhali (living, Bangladesh, f/nf/ch)
- Nirpal Singh Dhaliwal (born 1974, England, f/nf)
- Ranj Dhaliwal (born 1976/1977, Canada, f)
- Ghalib Shiraz Dhalla (born 1978, Kenya/US, f/d)
- Imtiaz Dharker (born 1954, Pakistan/England, p)
- Rolfes Robert Reginald Dhlomo (1906–1971, S Africa, nf/f)
- Dhurjati (c. 15th – 16th cc., India, p)
- Di An (笛安, born 1983, China, f)
- Henriette Diabaté (born 1935, Ivory Coast, nf)
- Massa Makan Diabaté (1938–1988, Mali, f/nf)
- Moussa Diagana (1946–2018, Mauritania, d)
- Souéloum Diagho (living, Mali, p)
- Lamine Diakhate (1928–1987, Senegal, p/nf)
- Aïda Mady Diallo (living, France/Mali, f)
- Koumanthio Zeinab Diallo (born 1956, Guinea, p/f/d)
- Nafissatou Niang Diallo (1941–1982, Senegal, nf/f)
- Jacqueline Diamond (born 1949, US, f)
- Jared Diamond (born 1937, US, nf)
- William Diaper (1685–1717, England, nf)
- Alpha Mandé Diarra (born 1954, Mali, nf)
- Oumou Armand Diarra (born 1967, Yugoslavia/US, nf)
- Gonçalves Dias (1823–1864, Brazil, p/d/nf)
- Junot Díaz (born 1968, Dominican Rep./US, nf)
- Mohammed Dib (1920–2003, Algeria, f/p/ch)
- Ebou Dibba (1943–2000, Gambia, f)
- Charles Dibdin (pre-1745–1814, England, d/f)
- Thomas Frognall Dibdin (1776–1847, England, nf)
- Thomas John Dibdin (1771–1841, England, d/p)
- Jude Dibia (born 1975, Nigeria, f)
- Kate DiCamillo (born 1964, US, ch)
- Jennifer K Dick (born 1970, US, p/nf)
- Philip K. Dick (1928–1982, US, f)
- Charles Dickens (1812–1870, England, f/nf)
- Monica Dickens (1915–1992, England, f/nf)
- John Dickenson (c. 1570–1636, England, f)
- James Dickey (1923–1997, US, p/f)
- Emily Dickinson (1830–1886, US, p)
- John Dickinson (born 1962, England, f/ch)
- Goldsworthy Lowes Dickinson (1862–1932, England, nf)
- Patric Dickinson (1914–1994, England, p/d)
- Peter Dickinson (1927–2015, N Rhodesia/England)
- Matthew Dickman (born 1975, US, p)
- Michael Dickman (born 1975, US, p)
- David Dickson (c. 1583–1663, Scotland, nf)
- Gordon R. Dickson (1923–2001, Canada/US, f)
- Walter Dickson (1916–1990, US/Sweden, f/nf)
- Denis Diderot (1713–1784, France, nf)
- Joan Didion (1934–2021, US, nf)
- Ernst Didring (1868–1931, Sweden, f)
- Lorenz Diefenbach (1806–1883, Germany, nf)
- José de Diego (1866–1918, Puerto Rico, p/nf)
- Alice Diehl (1844–1912, England, f/nf)
- Miep Diekmann (1925–2017, Netherlands, ch)
- Mame Younousse Dieng (1939–2016, Senegal, f/p)
- Alfredo Pareja Diezcanseco (1908–1953, Ecuador, f/nf)
- Joseph Diescho (born 1955, SW Africa/Namibia, f/nf)
- Dietmar von Aist (c. 1115 – c. 1171, Austria, p)
- Aminata Sophie Dièye (1973–2016, Senegal, nf/f/d)
- Anne Digby (born 1943, England, ch)
- Kenelm Digby (1603–1665, England, nf)
- Leonard Digges (1588–1635, England, nf/p)
- Arsen Diklić (1922–1995, Yugoslavia/Serbia, p/f)
- Elmer Diktonius (1896–1961, Finland, p)
- Dilman Dila (born 1977, Uganda, f/d)
- Gordana Đilas (born 1958, Yugoslavia/Serbia, p/nf)
- Charles Wentworth Dilke (1789–1864, England, nf)
- Wentworth Dilke (1810–1869, England/Russian E, nf)
- Annie Dillard (born 1945, US, f/nf)
- Francis Dillingham (died 1625, England, nf)
- Wentworth Dillon (1637–1685, England, p)
- Amy Dillwyn (1845–1935, Wales, f)
- Thomas DiLorenzo (born 1954, US, nf)
- Lyuben Dilov (1927–2008, Bulgaria, f)
- Lyuben Dilov Jr. (born 1964, Bulgaria, nf)
- Damon DiMarco (born 1971, US, nf)
- Jelena Dimitrijević (1862–1945, Serbia/Yugoslavia, f/p/nf)
- Vojin Dimitrijević (1932–2012, Italy/Serbia, nf)
- Dimitar Dimitrov (born 1937, Greece/N Macedonia, nf/ch)
- Ilko Dimitrov (born 1955, Bulgaria, p/ch/nf)
- Ljubica Ivošević Dimitrov (1884–1933, Serbia/Soviet Union, p)
- Blaga Dimitrova (1922–2003, Bulgaria, p)
- Kristin Dimitrova (born 1963, Bulgaria, p/f)
- Lidija Dimkovska (born 1971, Yugoslavia/N Macedonia, p/f)
- Dimitar Dimov (1909–1966, Bulgaria, d/f)
- Leonid Dimov (1926–1987, Romania, p)
- Milica Mićić Dimovska (1947–2013, Yugoslavia/Serbia, f)
- Petre Dimovski (born 1946, Yugoslavia/N Macedonia, f)
- Dinarchus (c. 361 – c. 291 BCE, Greece, nf)
- Isak Dinesen (1885–1962, Denmark, f), pseudonym of Karen Blixen
- Ding Ling (丁玲, 1904–1986, China, f/nf)
- Franz von Dingelstedt (1814–1881, Germany/Austria, p/d)
- Júlio Dinis (1839–1871, Portugal, p/d/f), born Joaquim Guilherme Gomes Coelho
- Ramdhari Singh Dinkar (1908–1974, India, p/nf)
- Dinon (fl. c. 360–340 BCE, Greece, nf)
- Artur Dinter (1876–1948, Germany, f)
- Diodorus Siculus (fl. 1st c. BCE, Greece, nf)
- Diogenes Laërtius (fl. 3rd c. CE, Greece, nf)
- Fatou Diome (born 1968, Senegal/France, f)
- E. J. Dionne (born 1952, US, nf)
- B. R. Dionysius (born 1969, Australia, p)
- Alioune Diop (1910–1980, Senegal, nf)
- Birago Diop (1906–1989, Senegal, p/f)
- Boubacar Boris Diop (born 1946, Senegal, f/nf/d)
- Cheikh Anta Diop (1923–1986, Senegal, nf)
- David Diop (1927–1960, French W Africa, p)
- Babacar Sedikh Diouf (born 1928, Senegal, nf)
- Nafissatou Dia Diouf (born 1973, Senegal, p/nf)
- Sylviane Diouf (living, France/US, nf)
- Farida Diouri (1953–2004, Morocco, f)
- Mbella Sonne Dipoko (1936–2009, Cameroon, f/p)
- Bill (William) Direen (born 1957, N Zealand, nf/d/p)
- Waris Dirie (born 1965, Somalia, nf)
- Paul Dirmeikis (born 1954, US/France, p/f)
- Adriaan van Dis (born 1946, Netherlands, f/d/nf)
- Vladislav Petković Dis (1880–1917, Serbia, p)
- Thomas M. Disch (1940–2008, US, f/p)
- Jenny Diski (1947–2016, England, nf)
- John Disney (1677–1729/1730, England, nf)
- John Disney (1746–1816, England, nf)
- John Disney (1779–1857, England, nf)
- Benjamin Disraeli (1804–1881, England, f/nf)
- Isaac D'Israeli (1766–1848, England, nf)
- Tony DiTerlizzi (born 1969, US, ch)
- Tove Ditlevsen (1917–1976, Denmark, p/f/nf/ch)
- Edith Ditmas (1896–1986, England, nf)
- Hugo Dittberner (born 1944, Germany, p/f/nf)
- Humphry Ditton (1675–1715, England, nf)
- Chitra Banerjee Divakaruni (born 1956, India/US, f/p)
- Tulsi Diwasa (born 1941, Nepal, p/nf), pseudonym of Tulsi Prasad Joshi
- Gregory Dix (1901–1952, England, nf)
- Ella Hepworth Dixon (1857–1932, England, f/nf/d)
- Franklin W. Dixon (fl. 1920s on, Canada, f/ch), pseudonym of several writers
- Henry Hall Dixon (1822–1870, England, nf)
- Sarah Dixon (1671–1765, England, p)
- Stephen Dixon (1936–2019, US, f)
- William Hepworth Dixon (1821–1979, England, nf/f)
- Zija Dizdarević (1916–1942, Austria-Hungary/Yugoslavia, f/nf)

== Dj–Dz ==
- Tahar Djaout (1954–1993, Algeria, nf/p/f)
- Assia Djebar (1936–2015, Algeria/France, f/nf/d)
- Amu Djoleto (born 1929, Gold Coast/Ghana, f/p/ch)
- Chris d'Lacey (born 1954, England, ch)
- Ratko Dmitrović (born 1958, Yugoslavia/Serbia, nf)
- Franciszek Ksawery Dmochowski (1762–1818, Poland, f/p/nf)
- Sydney Thompson Dobell (1824–1874, England, p/nf)
- Alfred Döblin (1878–1957, Germany, f/nf)
- Sava Dobroplodni (1820–1894, Bulgaria, nf)
- Pavol Dobšinský (1828–1885, Austria-Hungary/Hungary, nf)
- Henry Austin Dobson (1840–1921, England, p/nf)
- Rosemary Dobson (1920–2012, Australia, p)
- Susannah Dobson (c. 1742–1795, England, nf)
- Charles Dobzynski (1929–2014, Poland/France, p/nf)
- Guram Dochanashvili (1939–2021, USSR/Georgia, nf/f)
- Cory Doctorow (born 1971, Canada/England, f/nf)
- E. L. Doctorow (1931–2015, US, f)
- C. H. Dodd (1884–1973, Wales/England, nf)
- Catherine Isabella Dodd (1860–1932, England, f/nf)
- Christina Dodd (living, US, f)
- Lynley Dodd (born 1941, N Zealand, ch)
- William Dodd (1729–1777, England, p/f/nf)
- John Doddridge (1555–1628, England, nf)
- Philip Doddridge (1702–1751, England, nf/p)
- Heimito von Doderer (1896–1966, Germany, p/f)
- Mary Mapes Dodge (1831–1905, US, ch)
- George Dodington (1691–1762, England, nf)
- Mary Diana Dods (1790–1830, Scotland, nf)
- Robert Dodsley (1703–1764, England, p/d/nf)
- Christina Dodwell (born 1951, England, nf)
- Anthony Doerr (born 1973, US, f)
- Harriet Doerr (1910–2002, US, f/nf)
- Neel Doff (1858–1942, Netherlands/Belgium, f)
- Richard Dogbeh (1932–2003, Benin, f/nf/p)
- Gojko Đogo (born 1940, Yugoslavia/Serbia, p)
- Ann Doherty (c. 1786 – c. 1831/1832, England, f/d)
- Berlie Doherty (born 1943, England, f/p/d)
- Paul C. Doherty (born 1946, England, f/nf)
- Ștefan Augustin Doinaș (1922–2002, Romania, p), pseudonym of Ștefan Popa
- Digby Mackworth Dolben (1848–1867, England, p)
- Joe Dolce (born 1947, US/Australia, p/nf)
- Dorcas Dole (fl. later 17th c., England, nf)
- Tadeusz Dołęga-Mostowicz (1898–1939, Russian E/Poland, n
- Domentijan (c. 1210 – post-1264, Serbia, nf)
- Alfred Domett (1911–1987, England/N Zealand, p)
- Hilde Domin (1909–2006, Germany, p/nf), pseudonym of Hilde Palm
- Hans Dominik (1872–1945, Germany, f/nf)
- Angus Donald (born 1965, China/England, f)
- Robyn Donald (born 1942, N Zealand, f)
- Julia Donaldson (born 1948, England, ch/d)
- Anton Donchev (1930–2022, Bulgaria, f)
- Kristijonas Donelaitis (1714–1780, East Prussia, p)
- Dong Qichang (董其昌, 1555–1636, China, nf)
- Dong Xi (東西, born 1966, China, f/d)
- Dong Zhongshu (董仲舒, 179–104 BCE, China, nf)
- Emmanuel Dongala (born 1941, R of Congo, f/nf)
- Marion Dönhoff (1909–2002, Germany, nf)
- John Donne (1572–1631, England, p)
- Desmond Donnelly (1920–1974, England, nf)
- José Donoso (1924–1996, Chile, f/p)
- Eleanor Doorly (1880–1950, Jamaica/England, ch)
- Johnny van Doorn (1944–1991, Netherlands, p/nf)
- Bora Đorđević (born 1952, Yugoslavia/Serbia, p)
- Časlav Đorđević (born 1942, Yugoslavia/Serbia, nf/p)
- Jovan Đorđević (1826–1900, Austrian E/Serbia, nf)
- Mirko Đorđević (1938–2014, Yugoslavia/Serbia, nf)
- Mara Đorđević-Malagurski (1894–1971, Austria-Hungary/Yugoslavia, nf)
- Elisabeth Dored (1908–1972, Norway, f/nf)
- Ariel Dorfman (born 1942, Argentina/US, f/d/nf)
- Hélène Dorion (born 1958, Canada, p/f)
- Renate Dorrestein (1954–2018, Netherlands, f/nf)
- Doris Dörrie (born 1955, Germany, nf)
- Anna Hanson Dorsey (1815–1896, US, f)
- Roger Dorsinville (1911–1992, Haiti, f/p/nf)
- Tankred Dorst (1925–2017, Germany, d/f)
- John Dos Passos (1896–1970, US, f)
- Jovan Došenović (1781–1813, Serbia, nf/p)
- Dosoftei (1624–1693, Moldavia, nf/p)
- Fyodor Dostoevsky (1821–1881, Russia, f/nf)
- Christian Dotremont (1922–1979, Belgium, p)
- Ali Douagi (1909–1949, Tunisia, f/d/nf)
- Thomas Doubleday (1790–1870, England, nf)
- Francis Douce (1757–1834, England, nf)
- Sarah Doudney (1841–1926, England, f/p)
- Lucy Dougan (born 1966, Australia, p)
- Charles Montagu Doughty (1843–1926, England, p/nf)
- Louise Doughty (born 1963, England, f/nf/d)
- Lord Alfred Douglas (1870–1945, England, p/nf)
- Amanda Minnie Douglas (1831–1916, US, ch)
- Carole Nelson Douglas (1944–2021, US, f)
- Keith Douglas (1920–1944, England/France, p/nf)
- Kirk Douglas (1916–2020, US, f/nf)
- Mary Douglas (1921–2007, Italy/England, nf)
- Mona Douglas (1898–1987, England/Isle of Man, p/f/nf)
- Norman Douglas (1868–1953, Austria/Italy, f/nf)
- O. Douglas (1877–1948, Scotland, f)
- Róbert Ingi Douglas (born 1973, Iceland, d)
- Frederick Douglass (1817–1895, US, nf)
- Sara Douglass (1957–2011, Australia, f), pseudonym of Sara Warneke
- Lady Margaret Douglas-Home (1906–1996, England, nf)
- Autran Dourado (1926–2012, Brazil, f)
- Gustavo Dourado (born 1960, Brazil, p/nf)
- John Freeman Milward Dovaston (1782–1854, England, p/nf)
- Gabriel Dover (1937–2018, England, nf)
- Ceridwen Dovey (born 1980, S Africa/Australia, f)
- Unity Dow (born 1959, Botswana, f)
- Maureen Dowd (born 1952, US, nf)
- Siobhan Dowd (1960–2007, England, f/ch)
- Mary Frances Dowdall (1876–1939, England, f/nf)
- Mahmoud Dowlatabadi (born 1940, Iran, nf)
- Basil Dowling (1910–2000, N Zealand, p)
- Finuala Dowling (born 1962, S Africa, p/f)
- Andrew Downes (c. 1549–1628, England, nf)
- Jenny Downham (born 1964, England, f)
- James V. Downton (born 1938, US, nf)
- Ernest Dowson (1867–1900, England, p/f)
- Apostolos Doxiadis (born 1953, Australia/Greece, f/d)
- Adrian Conan Doyle (1910–1970, England, f)
- Arthur Conan Doyle (1859–1930, England, f)
- Debra Doyle (1952–2020, US, f/ch)
- Francis Hastings Doyle (1910–1988, England, p)
- Richard Doyle (1948–2017, England, f)
- Roddy Doyle (born 1958, Ireland, f/ch/d)
- Gardner Dozois (1947–2018, US, f)
- Margaret Drabble (born 1939, England, f/nf)
- Phil Drabble (1914–2007, England, nf)
- Albert Drach (1902–1995, Austria, f/d)
- Labud Dragić (born 1954, Yugoslavia/Serbia, f)
- Predrag Dragić (1945–2012, Yugoslavia/Serbia, nf/d)
- Rajna Dragićević (living, Yugoslavia/Serbia, nf)
- Crescent Dragonwagon (born 1952, US, f/nf/p), born Ellen Zolotow
- Terje Dragseth (born 1955, Norway, p/f)
- Tonke Dragt (born 1930, Dutch E Indies/Netherlands, ch)
- Osvaldo Dragún (1929–1999, Argentina, d)
- Rade Drainac (1899–1943, Serbia/Yugoslavia, p)
- David Drake (born 1945, US, f)
- Judith Drake (fl. 1670s – 1723, England, nf)
- Nathan Drake (1766–1836, England, nf)
- Nick Drake (born 1961, England, p)
- Shannon Drake (born 1953, US, f), pseudonym of Heather Graham Pozzessere
- Henrietta Drake-Brockman (1901–1968, Australia, f/nf/d)
- Augusta Theodosia Drane (1823–1894, England, nf)
- Michael Dransfield (1947–1973, Australia, p)
- Ruth Draper (1884–1956, US, d)
- Slavka Drašković (living, Yugoslavia/Serbia, nf)
- Vuk Drašković (born 1946, Yugoslavia/Serbia, nf)
- Michael Drayton (1563–1631, England, p)
- Mladen Dražetin (1951–2015, Yugoslavia/Serbia, nf/p)
- Zebulon Dread (living, S Africa, nf), pseudonym of Elliot Josephs
- Theodore Dreiser (1871–1945, US, f/nf)
- John Drinkwater (1882–1937, England, d/p)
- Ursula Dronke (1920–2012, England, p/nf)
- Bart FM Droog (born 1966, Netherlands, p/nf)
- Imme Dros (born 1936, Netherlands, ch)
- Annette von Droste-Hülshoff (1797–1848, Germany, p/f)
- Wiglaf Droste (1961–2019, Germany, p/f/nf)
- Minou Drouet (born 1947, France, p/f/nf)
- Gustave Drouineau (1798–1878, France, f/p/d)
- Neil Druckmann (born 1978, Israel/US, f)
- Joan Druett (born 1939, N Zealand, nf/f)
- Vasil Drumev (c. 1841–1901, Bulgaria, nf), entitled Kliment of Tarnovo)
- Flick Drummond (born 1962, England, nf)
- Henry Drummond (1786–1860, England, nf)
- June Drummond (1923–2011, S Africa, f)
- William Hamilton Drummond (1778–1865, Ireland, p/nf)
- Maurice Druon (1918–2009, France, f/nf)
- Anna Harriett Drury (1824–1912, England, f/p/ch)
- Ann Druyan (born 1949, US, nf)
- John Dryden (1631–1700, England, p/nf)
- Marin Držić (1508–1567, Ragusa/Venice, d/nf)
- Dinesh D'Souza (born 1961, India/US, nf)
- Du Fu (杜甫, 712–770, China, p)
- Du Guangting (杜光庭, 850–933, China, nf/f)
- Du Huan (杜環, fl. 8th c., China, nf)
- Du Mu (杜牧, 803–852, China, p)
- Du You (杜佑, 735–812, China, nf)
- Duan Chengshi (段成式, died 863 CE, China, p/ch)
- Duan Shuqing (端淑卿, c. 1510 – c. 1600, China, p)
- Diane Duane (born 1952, US/Ireland, f/ch)
- Fausto Duarte (1903–1953, Cape Verde I/Guinea-Bissau, f/nf)
- Duanmu Hongliang (端木蕻良, 1912–1996, China, f)
- Caroline Dubois (born 1960, France, p)
- Edward Dubois (1774–1850, England, nf)
- Ursula Dubosarsky (born 1961, Australia, ch/f)
- Bernard Dubourg (1945–1992, France, p/nf)
- Isidore Lucien Ducasse (1846–1970, Uruguay/France, p)
- Réjean Ducharme (1941–2017, Canada, f/d)
- Jovan Dučić (1871–1943, Ottoman E/US, p/nf)
- Stephen Duck (c. 1705–1756, England, p)
- Marilyn Duckworth (born 1935, N Zealand, f/p)
- Agnes Mary Frances Duclaux (1857–1944, England, p/f/nf)
- Henry Dudeney (1857–1930, England, nf)
- Tessa Duder (born 1940, N Zealand, ch/f/d)
- Ernest Dudley (1908–2006, England, d/f/nf), pseudonym of Vivian Ernest Coltman-Allen
- Slatan Dudow (1903–1963, Bulgaria/Germany, d)
- Guadalupe Dueñas (1910–2002, Mexico, f/nf)
- Alan Duff (born 1950, N Zealand, f/nf)
- Charles Duff (1894–1966, N Ireland/England, nf)
- Lucie, Lady Duff-Gordon (1821–1869, nf), pseudonym Lucie Gordon
- Lord Dufferin (1826–1902, England, nf)
- Maureen Duffy (1933–2026, England, p/d/f/nf)
- Stella Duffy (born 1963, England, f)
- Michael Dugan (1947–2006, Australia, p/ch)
- Florence Dugdale (1879–1937, England, ch/b)
- William Dugdale (1605–1686, England, nf)
- Alfred Duggan (1903–1964, England, f/nf)
- Eileen Duggan (1894–1972, N Zealand, p/nf)
- Laurie Duggan (born 1949, Australia, p/nf)
- Maurice Duggan (1922–1974, N Zealand, f)
- Georges Duhamel (1884–1966, France, nf/p)
- Ian Duhig (born 1954, England, p)
- Kate Duignan (born 1974, N Zealand, f/nf)
- K. Sello Duiker (1974–2005, S Africa, f/d)
- Momčilo Đujić (1907–1999, Serbia/US, nf)
- Dragomir Dujmov (born 1963, Hungary/Serbia, p/f)
- León Dujovne (1898–1984, Argentina, nf)
- Antera Duke (died post-1788, Calabar
- Jas H. Duke (1939–1992, Australia, p/f)
- Richard Duke (1658–1711, England, p)
- Ashley Dukes (1885–1959, England, d/nf)
- Cuthbert Dukes (1890–1977, England, nf)
- Alexandre Dumas, père (father, 1802–1870, France, f)
- Alexandre Dumas, fils (son, 1824–1895, France, f/d)
- Nodar Dumbadze (1928–1984, USSR, f/nf)
- Tug Dumbly (living, Australia, p), pseudonym of Geoff Forrester
- Petru Dumitriu (1924–2002, Romania/France, f)
- Michael Dummett (1925–2011, England, nf)
- Komla Dumor (1972–2014, Ghana, nf)
- Jozef Dunajovec (1933–2007, Czechoslovakia/Slovakia, nf)
- Sarah Dunant (born 1950, England, f/nf)
- Dunash ha-Levi ben Labrat (920/925 – post-985, Spain, p/nf)
- Joyce Dunbar (born 1944, England, ch)
- Paul Laurence Dunbar (1872–1906, US, p/f)
- William Dunbar (1450 or 1460 – pre-1530, Scotland, p)
- Lois Duncan (1934–2016, US, f/nf/p)
- Sandy Frances Duncan (born 1942, Canada, f)
- Susan Duncan (1951–2024, Australia, nf)
- John Duncombe (1729–1786, England, p/nf)
- William Duncombe (1690–1769, England, d/nf)
- Conradine Birgitte Dunker (1780–1866, Norway, nf)
- Roderic Dunkerley (1884–1966, England, nf)
- William Arthur Dunkerley (1852–1941, England, f/nf/p)
- Susan Dunlap (born 1943, US, f)
- Helen Dunmore (1952–2017, England, p/f/ch)
- Antony Dunn (born 1973, England, p/d)
- Carola Dunn (born 1946, England/US, f)
- Max Dunn (1895–1963, Australia, p)
- Nell Dunn (born 1936, England, d/f)
- Peter Dunn (born 1977, US, nf)
- Peter Dunn (living, Australia, nf)
- Tom Newton Dunn (born 1973, England, nf)
- Dominick Dunne (1925–2009, US, nf)
- Eric Dunning (1936–2019, England, nf)
- Lord Dunsany (1878–1957, England/Ireland, f/p/d)
- John Dunton (1659–1733, England, nf)
- Gerina Dunwich (born 1959, US, nf/p)
- Cameron Duodu (born 1937, Gold Coast/England, f/nf)
- Jacques Dupin (1927–2012, France, p/nf)
- James Duport (1606–1679, England, nf)
- John Duport (died 1617, England, nf)
- Jeanne DuPrau (born 1944, US, f)
- Jean-Pierre Duprey (1930–1959, France, p)
- Mary Durack (1913–1994, Australia, f/ch/p)
- Lee Duran (1939–2022, US, f), pseudonym of Ruth Jean Dale
- Mortimer Durand (1850–1924, India/England, nf)
- Marguerite Duras (1914–1996, French Indochina/France, f/d/nf)
- Francis Durbridge (1912–1998, England, d/f)
- Bohdana Durda (born 1940, Ukraine, p)
- C. V. Durell (1882–1968, England/S Africa, nf)
- Thomas D'Urfey (1653–1723, England, d/p/nf)
- Raymond Durgnat (1932–2002, England, nf)
- David Anthony Durham (born 1969, US, f)
- Edith Durham (1863–1944, England, nf)
- Antonije Đurić (1929–2020, Yugoslavia/Serbia, nf)
- Ivan Đurić (1947–1997, Yugoslavia/France, nf)
- Duris of Samos (c. 350 – post-281, BCE, Greece, nf)
- José António Duro (1875–1899, Portugal, p)
- Jelena Đurović (born 1973, Yugoslavia/Serbia, f/nf)
- Ljiljana Habjanović Đurović (born 1953, Yugoslavia/Serbia, f)
- Gerald Durrell (1925–1995, Greece/Jersey, nf)
- Lawrence Durrell (1912–1990, Greece/Jersey, f/nf)
- Friedrich Dürrenmatt (1921–1990, Switzerland, f/d/nf)
- Dorothy Dury (1613–1664, Ireland/England, nf)
- G. H. Dury (1916–1996, England, nf)
- Michael Madhusudan Dutt (1824–1873, India, p/d/nf)
- R. Palme Dutt (1896–1974, England, nf)
- Toru Dutt (1856–1877, India, p/f)
- Geoffrey Dutton (1922–1998, Australia, f/p/ch)
- Olav Duun (1876–1939, Norway, f)
- Karen Duve (born 1961, Germany, f/nf)
- Mona Van Duyn (1921–2004, US, p)
- John C. Dvorak (born 1952, US, nf)
- Ashvin Dwarka (born 1977, Mauritius, f)
- Stuart Dybek (born 1942, US, f/p)
- Christopher Dyer (born 1944, England, nf)
- Edward Dyer (1543–1607, England, p)
- Geoff Dyer (born 1958, England/US, f/nf)
- George Dyer (1755–1841, England, p)
- John Dyer (1699–1757, Wales/England, p)
- Wayne Dyer (1940–2015, US, nf)
- Stanisław Dygat (1914–1978, Poland, f)
- Bob Dylan (born 1941, US, p)
- Clifford Dyment (1914–1971, England, p/nf)
- Astrid Sverresdotter Dypvik (born 1977, Norway, nf)
- Edward Dyson (1865–1931, Australia, p/d/f)
- Freeman Dyson (1923–2020, England/US,
- Petar Džadžić (1929–1996, Yugoslavia/Serbia, nf)
- Christine Dzidrums (born 1971, US, ch)
