= Daoud =

Daoud may refer to:

== Given name ==
- David in Islam
- Daoud ibn al-Adid (died 1207/08), 25th Imam of Hafizi Ismailism
- Daoud Amoun (1867–1922), Lebanese Maronite Christian politician
- Daoud Ahmed Faisal (1891–1980), American Sunni Muslim missionary
- Daoud Bokhary (born 1920), Hong Kong businessman of Pakistani origin
- Daoud Bousbiba (born 1995), Dutch footballer
- Daoud Yaya Brahim (1962–2024), Chadian military leader and politician
- Daoud Corm (1852–1930), Lebanese painter
- Daoud Hanania (born 1934), Jordanian heart surgeon
- Daoud Hari, Sudanese tribesman
- Daoud El-Issa (1903–1983), Palestinian journalist
- Daoud Kuttab (born 1955), Palestinian journalist
- Daoud Lamei (born 1962), Egyptian Coptic Orthodox priest
- Daoud Musa (born 1982), Qatari basketball player
- Daoud Mustafa Khalid (1917–2008), Sudanese physician and neurologist
- Daoud Naji (born 1973), Afghan politician
- Daoud Abdel Sayed (1946–2025), Egyptian director and screenwriter
- Daoud Soumain (died 2008), Chadian army officer
- Daoud Aoulad-Syad (born 1953), Moroccan photographer
- Daoud Wais (born 1986), Djiboutian footballer
- Daoud Anum Yemoh (born 1954), Ghanaian journalist

== Middle name ==
- Mohammad Daoud Khan

== Surname ==
- Abakar Abdelkerim Daoud (born 1968), Chadian military officer
- Abu Daoud (1937–2010), Palestinian militant, teacher and lawyer
- Ahmad Daoud (born 1942), Syrian researcher, writer and historian
- Alex Daoud (1943–2025), American attorney, politician and author of Lebanese descent
- Ali Mohamed Daoud (born 1950), Djiboutian politician
- Askia Daoud (died 1582), ruler of the Songhai Empire from 1549 to 1582
- David Daoud (born 1970), Lebanese-born French painter
- Hassan Daoud (born 1950), Lebanese writer and journalist
- Hichem Daoud (born 1992), Algerian handball player
- Ignatius Moses I Daoud (1930–2012), Cardinal Patriarch Emeritus of Antioch
- Kamel Daoud (born 1970), Algerian writer and journalist
- Mohammad Daoud (disambiguation), several people
- Mohammed Daoud (1901–1984), Moroccan writer and historian
- Qassim Daoud (born 1949), Iraqi scientist and politician
- Rageh Daoud (born 1954), Egyptian composer
- Suheir Abu Oksa Daoud, Palestinian writer, poet and academic
- Zohra Daoud (born 1954), American TV celebrity, radio show host and journalist of Afghan descent

== See also ==
- Daud (disambiguation)
- Dawood (disambiguation)
- Dawud (disambiguation)
- David (disambiguation)
- Dawoud, Arabic name
