= Davood =

Davood is the Persian language spelling of the name Daud or Dawood, corresponding to David. Notable people with the name include:

- Davood Ghadami (born 1982), English actor
- Davood Mir-Bagheri (born 1958), Iranian film director
- Davood Moradian, Afghan politician
- Davood Parsa-Pajouh (1941–2015), Iranian scholar
- Davood Azad (born 1963), Iranian singer
- Davood Younesi (born 1990), Iranian singer and musician

== See also ==
- Daud (disambiguation)
- Dawood (disambiguation)
- Dawud (disambiguation)
- David (disambiguation)
- Dawoud, Arabic name
