= Dawoud =

Dawoud (Arabic: دَاوُد dāwūd) is an Arabic male given name and surname which is a written variant of the male given name Daud. It is also the Arabic name equivalent to David.

It may refer to:

== As a given name ==
- Dawoud Bey (born 1953), American photographer and educator
- Dawoud al-Marhoon, Saudi Arabian who as a teenager participated in the Saudi Arabian protests during the 2011 Arab Spring
- Dawoud Rajiha (1947–2012), Syrian minister of defense from (2011–2012)
- Dawoud Sulaiman (born 1990), Emirati professional footballer

== As a surname ==
- Diaa al-Din Dawoud (1926–2011), Egyptian politician and activist
- Khaled Dawoud, Egyptian journalist and politician
- Youssef Dawoud, (1938–2012), Egyptian actor

== See also ==
- Daoud (disambiguation)
- Daud (disambiguation)
- Dawood (disambiguation)
- Dawud (disambiguation)
- Davood
- David (name)
