= Moradian =

Moradian is a surname. Notable people with the surname include:

- Davood Moradian, Afghan politician
- Ehsan Moradian (born 1994), Iranian footballer
- Ralph Moradian (1906–1997), American lawyer, judge and editor
- Soudabeh Moradian (born 1972), Iranian filmmaker
