= Pierrot's Troupe =

Theatre group in New Delhi, India

Pierrot's Troupe is a theatre group based in New Delhi, India, which was formed in 1989. The group performs original plays in Hindi, Urdu and English. Pierrot's troupe has performed more than 2000 plays touring throughout India, and has staged its dramas in the US, Dubai and UK.

Pierrot's Troupe is led by playwright and director M. Sayeed Alam, who has written and directed all of their plays, and also acts in most of them. He has been described as "a pioneer of unconventional and fresh theatre in India". Alam has a PhD in International Politics from Aligarh Muslim University. He is the author of a book, and has published 17 research papers.

Their plays are critically acclaimed as well as popularly well received. Some of their most popular plays include Ghalib in New Delhi (Hindi comedy), Mohan se Mahatma (Hindi), Cut Cut Cut (Hindi comedy), Big B (English comedy), Maulana Azad (Urdu monologue), K. L. Saigal (Hindi musical), Ghalib (Urdu musical), Massage (Hindi comedy), 1947 (Urdu), Chacha Chakkan in Action (Hindi and Urdu), Letters of Ghalib (Urdu), Lal quile ki aakhri mushaera (Urdu), and Sons of Babur.

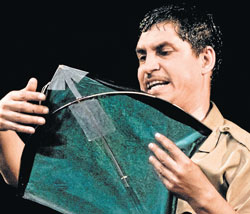
Dr. M Sayeed Alam

Their productions have included Indian theatre, cinema and television actors including Tom Alter, Rakesh Bedi, Saleem Shah, Simple Kaul, Uday Chandra, Chander Khanna, Hareesh Chhabra, Vibhav Srivastava at IMDb Vishnu Sharma,
