= Georges Dessommes =

American writer

Georges Dessommes (New Orleans, 1855-Burbank, California, 1929) was an American French language writer.

He was Édouard Dessommes' youngest brother and he moved to Paris with his family in 1860, escaping from American Civil War. In 1870, he came back to New Orleans and his poems were first published in Comptes-Rendus de l'Athénée Louisianais or Carillon. He was a main editor in Charles Bleton's publication Le Petit Journal.

== Novels ==
- Tante Cydette , 1888.
