= Dawud =

Dawud may refer to:

- David in Islam
- Dawud (name)
- Dawud of Kanem, half-brother of the 14th-century Kanem emperor Idris I of Kanem
- An-Nasir Dawud, Kurdish ruler
- Askia Dawud, ruler of the Songhai Empire
- Mohammad Al-Dawud, Jordanian football player

== See also ==
- Daoud (disambiguation)
- Daud (disambiguation)
- Dawood (disambiguation)
- David (disambiguation)
- Davood, Persian name
- Dawoud, Arabic name
