= Dawoodi =

Dawoodi may refer to:

- Dawoodi Bohra, a denomination of the Ismā’īlī branch of Shia Islam
- Dawoodi language, an Indo-Aryan language spoken by the Domaa community in Gilgit-Baltistan, Pakistan

== See also ==
- Dawood
