= Louisiana literature =

The literature of Louisiana, United States, includes fiction, poetry, and nonfiction. Representative authors include Kate Chopin, Alcée Fortier, Ernest Gaines, Walker Percy, Anne Rice and John Kennedy Toole.

== History ==
A printing press began operating in New Orleans in 1764.

The French-language newspapers Courrier de la Louisiane (1807-1860) and L’Abeille de la Nouvelle-Orléans (1827-1923) published "literary material."

The francophone Athénée Louisianais formed in 1876. Lafcadio Hearn's La Cuisine Creole, a cookbook, was published in New Orleans in 1885.

In the late 19th century Kate Chopin (1851–1904), Grace King (1852–1932), and Alice Dunbar Nelson (1875–1935) wrote about Louisiana Creole people.

In 1935 Robert Penn Warren launched The Southern Review, based in Baton Rouge.

== Louisiana Literary Award ==
The Louisiana Library Association has made an annual award to Louisiana Literature since 1949.

== Louisiana Writer Award ==
The Louisiana Writer Award is given annually by the Louisiana Center for the Book at the State Library of Louisiana "to recognize the extraordinary contributions to the state's literary heritage exemplified by the artist's body of work."

== See also ==
- Category:Writers from Louisiana
- List of newspapers in Louisiana
- Category:Louisiana in fiction
- Category:Libraries in Louisiana
- Southern United States literature
- American literary regionalism

== Bibliography ==
=== published in 19th-20th c. ===
- L'Album littéraire: journal des jeunes gens, amateurs de littérature [Literary Album] (in French), New Orleans, OCLC 288024259 1843-
- Charles Testut [in French] (1850). Portraits litteraires de la Nouvelle-Orleans (in French).
- Thomas M'Caleb, ed. (1894), The Louisiana Book: Selections from the Literature of the State, New Orleans: R.F. Straughan, OCLC 759282
- May W. Mount (1896). Some Notables of New Orleans; Biographical and Descriptive Sketches of the Artists of New Orleans, and their Work.
- Alexander Nicolas De Menil (1904). Literature of the Louisiana Territory.
- Alcée Fortier (1904). "English literature of Louisiana". History of Louisiana. Goupil & Co. pp. 261–263. (+ French literature, p.259+)
- "Louisiana's Contribution to the Literature of the United States". The South in the Building of the Nation. Vol. 7. Richmond, VA: Southern Historical Publication Society. 1909. pp. 314–326. hdl:2027/yale.39002004114386.
- Lucian Lamar Knight, ed. (1913). "Fifty Reading Courses: Louisiana". Library of Southern Literature. Vol. 16. Atlanta: Martin and Hoyt Company. p. 195. hdl:2027/uc1.31175034925258 – via HathiTrust.
- Elsie Dershem (1921). "Louisiana". Outline of American State Literature. Lawrence, Kansas: World Company – via Internet Archive.
- Ruby Van Allen Caulfield (1929). French Literature of Louisiana. New York: Columbia University. OCLC 4174484.
- Edward Larocque Tinker (1933). Les écrits de langue française en Louisiane au XIXe siècle (in French). reprint 1975
- Federal Writers' Project (1941). "Literature". Louisiana: a Guide to the State. American Guide Series. NY: Hastings House. pp. 178–189. hdl:2027/uc1.$b727648. ISBN 9780403021697.
- G. Thomas Tanselle (1971). Guide to the Study of United States Imprints. Harvard University Press. ISBN 978-0-674-36761-6. (Includes information about Louisiana literature)
- Mignon Morse (1988). Northwest Louisiana Authors.
- Dorothy H. Brown (1992). Louisiana Women Writers.

=== published in 21st c. ===
- Barbara C. Ewell (2001). "Literature of Louisiana". In Joseph M. Flora; Lucinda Hardwick MacKethan (eds.). Companion to Southern Literature: Themes, Genres, Places, People, Movements, and Motifs. Louisiana State University Press. pp. 455-461. ISBN 978-0-8071-2692-9.
- Joan Wylie Hall (2002). "Louisiana Writers of the Postbellum South". In Carolyn Perry; Mary Louise Weaks (eds.). History of Southern Women's Literature. Louisiana State University Press. pp. 201+. ISBN 978-0-8071-2753-7.
- Suzanne Disheroon-Green (2003). "Regional Identities in Louisiana and the Bayou Country". In Charles L. Crow (ed.). Companion to the Regional Literatures of America. Blackwell. ISBN 978-0-470-99907-3.
- Louisiana Literature and Literary Figures. edited by Mathé Allain. Lafayette: Center for Louisiana Studies, 2004
- M. Lynn Weiss, ed. (2004). Creole Echoes: The Francophone Poetry of Nineteenth-century Louisiana. Norman R. Shapiro, translator. University of Illinois Press. ISBN 978-0-252-07149-2. (Anthology)
- Kris Lackey (2006). "New Orleans". In Tom Quirk; Gary Scharnhorst (eds.). American History Through Literature 1870-1920. Detroit: Charles Scribner's Sons. ISBN 9780684314938.
- Catharine Savage Brosman (2013). Louisiana Creole Literature: A Historical Study. University Press of Mississippi. ISBN 978-1-61703-910-2.
- Susan Larson (2013). Booklover's Guide to New Orleans (2nd ed.). Louisiana State University Press. ISBN 978-0-8071-5309-3.
- Rien Fertel (2014). Imagining the Creole City: The Rise of Literary Culture in Nineteenth-Century New Orleans. Louisiana State University Press. ISBN 978-0-8071-5824-1.
