= Grace King =

American novelist, biographer, historian

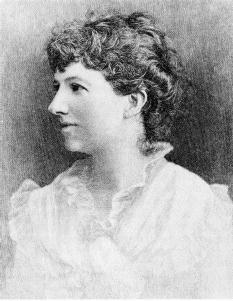
Grace King, 1887

Grace Elizabeth King (November 29, 1851 – January 14, 1932) was an American author of Louisiana stories, history, and biography, and a leader in historical and literary activities.

King began her literary career as a response to George Washington Cable's negative portrayal of Louisiana Creoles. King desired to create a sympathetic portrayal of Louisianians and Southerners based on her observations and experiences. King viewed herself as a type of representative for the region, although she herself was not in fact a Creole. King also became a representative for Southern women. In her literary works, King focuses primarily on women and women's issues in Reconstruction and its aftermath. King also emphasizes how race and class affected the lives of women. Some of King's most popular stories portray white women from aristocratic families experiencing poverty and black women struggling to find their place in society. These stories show King's concern for the changing status of all women in the South following the Civil War.

However, literary scholars debate over the significance of King's depiction of African-Americans. Feminist critics of the 1980s and 1990s valued King's emphasis on the experience of Southern women. Some feminist critics believed King's portrayal of black women gave them sexual independence. However, some feminist scholars believe King displayed white supremacism in her fiction. Other literary scholars disagree and believe that King created strong black female characters with moral agency.

== Early life ==
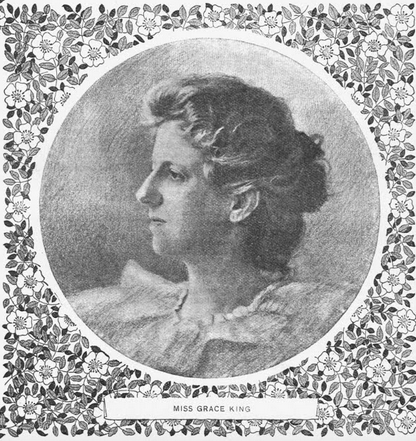
Grace King

Grace Elizabeth King was born on November 29, 1851, in New Orleans, Louisiana, to William Woodson King and Sarah Ann Miller King. King was the third of seven children. King's family had an aristocratic background. Her father was a prominent lawyer, slave owner, and part owner of a sugar plantation, L'Embarrass Plantation in south central Louisiana. King and her family were Scotch-Irish, but they socialized and identified with the aristocratic Creoles despite lacking Creole heritage.

After Union troops invaded and occupied New Orleans in the Civil War, the King family sought refuge at L'Embarrass Plantation. King and her family remained at the plantation for the remainder of the war. While living at L'Embarrass Plantation, the King children studied under their parents and maternal grandmother. After the war, King returned to New Orleans with her family. King also returned to school. Despite being Presbyterian, King attended French-speaking Catholic convent schools in New Orleans. The King family lost most of their wealth and property in the Civil War. In the following years, the Kings struggled financially and subsequently suffered from humiliation. Many of the characters in King's fiction face similar situations.

During her twenties, King focused primarily on her social and intellectual activities. After King finished her formal schooling, she continued to educate herself by reading books on a variety of topics. Although King had a few courtships and attempted to meet proper suitors, she never married or viewed marriage as a goal. In 1884, King met Julia Ward Howe and joined her literary club, the Pan Gnostics. Each week the members met to discuss literary subjects and hear an original paper by a member. King's paper, "Heroines of Novels", became her first published piece. It was published in the New Orleans Times-Democrat on May 31, 1885. The article compared the various depictions of women in German, French, British, and American literature.

== Literary career ==
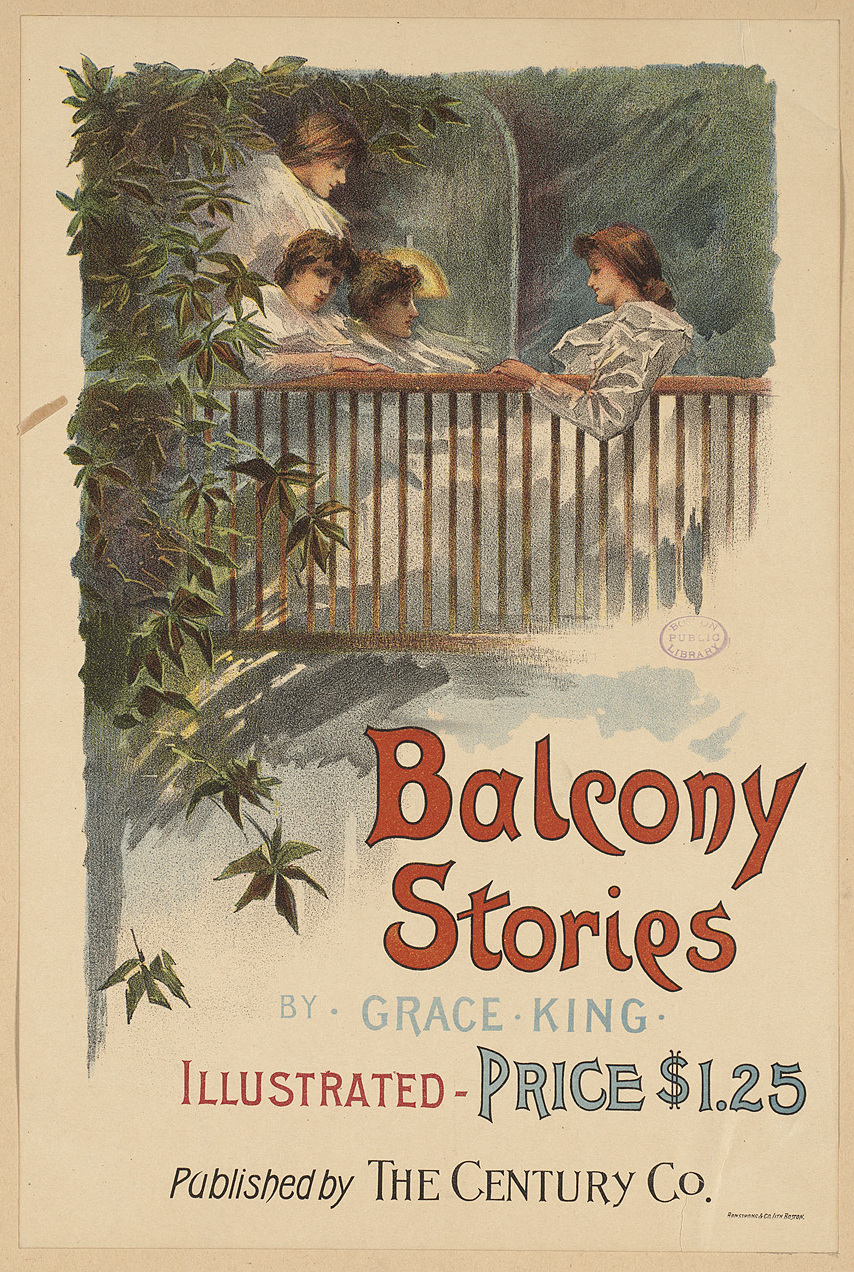
Book poster ad for Balcony Stories by Grace King

While attending the 1885 Cotton Centennial Exposition, King met the northern editor Richard Watson Gilder. The pair discussed why Creoles hated the literature of George Washington Cable, and Gilder asked King why Louisianians such as herself never tried to write their interpretation of Louisiana. The following morning King wrote her first published short story, "Monsieur Motte." With the help of King's friend and unofficial literary agent, Charles Dudley Warner, "Monsieur Motte" was published anonymously in the New Princeton Review in 1886. "Monsieur Motte" describes the relationship between Marie Modeste, an orphaned girl about to graduate from boarding school in New Orleans and her hairdresser, Marcélite. When the uncle paying for Marie's education never arrives to take Marie home, Marcélite reveals that she used to be a slave for Marie's mother and feels loyal toward Marie. In order to care for Marie, Marcélite secretly created the mythical Monsieur Motte and paid for Marie's education. King would only acknowledge her authorship of the story after its success. With the encouragement of Warner, King wrote three succeeding parts and published them alongside the original story as the novel, Monsieur Motte in 1888. The novel shows Marie and Marcélite dealing with the aftermath of Marcélite's deception. The novel also follows Marie as she enters society at a ball and meets Charles Montyon. Marie and Charles marry, with Marcélite giving Marie away.

One reason King began writing and publishing was her desire to be financially independent from her brothers. After the publication of "Monsieur Motte," King began writing short stories for Harper's Magazine. Many of these stories later appeared in her collections, Tales of a Time and Place. King also wrote and published the novellas "Earthlings" and "The Chevalier Alain de Triton" for literary magazines. In 1893, the Century Company published another collection of King's short stories, Balcony Stories. Balcony Stories represents a shift in King's fictional writing. Her stories become much shorter, including less descriptions and simpler plots. However, the stories still contained King's signature traits. The stories were told from the point of view of women who experienced the loss of social status, money, and family members due to the Civil War and Reconstruction.

In the 1890s, King began writing histories, focusing on colonial Louisiana. King's histories were heavily influenced by her friend, Charles Gayarré, a Louisiana historian and intellectual. Gayarré also was a close friend of King's father. King dedicated her book, New Orleans: The Place and the People (1895) to Gayarré. Scholars debate over the significance of King's histories. Some scholars find King's histories to be inconsequential due to King's focus on men. Some scholars believe King's histories are important because she was the first southern women to write history of importance. However, other scholars argue that King's interpretation of historical facts creates a feminized social history. King's interest in and knowledge of history led to her serving as either the secretary, vice-president, and president of the Louisiana Historical Society for over thirty years.

On a trip to New York in 1899, King met George Brett, the president of Macmillan Publishing Company. Brett asked King to write a novel about Reconstruction in the style of Thomas Nelson Page's romantic work. King rejected the notion that anything romantic occurred during Reconstruction, but she did write a novel, The Pleasant Ways of St. Medard, based on the experience of the King family in Reconstruction. King spent years writing the book, losing most of her artistic energy in the process. The book was rejected multiple times by the Macmillan Company and other publishers. In 1916, Alfred Harcourt of Henry Holt and Company agreed to publish the novel, but it never received wide distribution or publicity. However, many critics view the novel as King's masterpiece. It tells the story of two families, white and black, in St. Medard, Louisiana. The novel follows the families through the social, economic, and psychological effects of the Civil War, including the crisis of masculinity experienced by southern patriarchs and freedmen. King also described the new roles women played after military defeat.

Throughout her literary career, King became friends and corresponded with many of the most notable writers and literary critics of her day. One of King's most famous friends was Samuel Clemens. King felt comfortable with Clemens because of his southern upbringing, and Clemens enjoyed exchanging stories about the Mississippi River with King. Through her travels, King became part of an American-French-British network composed of women. She exchanged letters with Anne Clough, Madame Blanc, Sarah Orne Jewett, and Ruth McEnery Stuart. King also enjoyed friendships with Hamilton Wright Mabie, editor of Outlook and Henry Mills Alden, editor of Harper's Magazine. King frequently entertained writers, editors, and professors at her home, too.

While King was considered a minor author, she received much recognition for her literary talents and knowledge of history. In June 1915, Tulane University awarded King with an honorary degree of doctor of letters. In 1918, King received the gold palms of Officier de l'Instruction Publique from France.

== Death and legacy ==
In the last fifteen years of her life, King frequently experienced bouts of ill health. By 1928, she had difficulty holding a pen and writing. On January 4, 1932, King suffered a stroke, and she remained bedridden for the rest of her life. Her sisters, Nan and Nina cared for her until she died on the morning of January 14, 1932.

She is buried in Metairie Cemetery in New Orleans.

King finished her autobiography, Memories of a Southern Woman of Letters shortly before her death. Macmillan Publishing Company published King's autobiography a few months later. In her autobiography, King offered little information about her private self. Instead, King maintained her public persona by presenting herself as a respectable southern lady.

Grace King High School on Grace King Place in Metairie, Louisiana, was named in her honor and held her name for decades. On April 5, 2023, the Jefferson Parish School Board, under heavy opposition from current students and alumni, voted to close Grace King and move Haynes Advanced Academy from its Old Metairie campus to Grace King's campus. Haynes Academy officially opened in its new location at the beginning of the 2023–2024 school year.

The Residential Life Administration building at Louisiana State University is also named after her.

== Selected bibliography ==
- Monsieur Motte (1888) (Text from University of North Carolina)
- Tales of a Time and Place (1892)
- Balcony Stories (1893) (Text from University of North Carolina)
- New Orleans: The Place and the People (1895)
- Stories from Louisiana History (1905)
- The Pleasant Ways of St. Médard (1916)
- Creole Families of New Orleans (1921)
- La Dame de Sainte Hermine (1924)
- Memories of a Southern Woman of Letters (1932)

== See also ==
- Literature of Louisiana
