= Daud Rahbar =

Pakistani scholar

Daud Rahbar (1926 – 5 October 2013) was a Pakistani scholar of comparative religions, Arabic, Persian, Urdu literature and Indian classical music. Rahbar is regarded as an accomplished essayist, poet, composer, short story writer, translator, philosopher,contributor to inter-civilization dialogue, musicologist, drummer, singer and guitarist.He translated his own Urdu works to English, such as The Cup of Jamshid: A Collection of Ghazal Poetry and then translated the Urdu letters of Mirzā Asadu'lldh Khān Ghālib.

After a teaching career in England, Canada, Turkey and the United States, he retired as Professor Emeritus of Comparative religions from Boston University in 1991.

== Early life ==
Daud Rahbar grew up in Model Town, Lahore, Pakistan between 1929 and 1949. The town was the first cooperative society in the Indian subcontinent, a suburb based on the design of a Hindu architect, Divan Khem Chand. The town was autonomous from Lahore City's jurisdiction, and sectioned into blocks. Each block was populated by either Muslims, Sikhs or Hindus (where the Hindus constitute the largest community). He remarked that his close association with Hindus "made the love of Hindu communities a natural condition of [his] soul." His childhood was spent writing poetry (he took the pen name 'Rahbar' at the age of eight), gardening and walking with his father while discussing Arabic and Persian literature.

== Family ==
Rahbar's father, Dr. Muhammad Iqbal (1894–1948), was named after Sir Muhammad Iqbal. He graduated with an M.A in Arabic and was the recipient of a State scholarship from the University of Cambridge.He studied under Arabist professors Edward G. Browne, R.A. Nicholson and Anthony Ashley Bevan. After receiving his PhD, Iqbal was appointed Professor of Persian language at the University of the Punjab in 1922 and remained for 26 years. He was later appointed President of Oriental College, Lahore.

Rahbar had five siblings. Rahbar married Sabiha Ahmed on 9 April 1950. The couple had two daughters. Sabiha's father Aga Ghiassudin Ahmed, was a lawyer and botanist and President of Agricultural College in Lyallpur (now University of Agriculture, Faisalabad). Sabiha was a poet as well, although she never received recognition.

== Education ==
Rahbar graduated from the Government College, Lahore with an M.A in Arabic in 1947.He received the McLeod Research Scholarship and was employed to teach Arabic literature at Oriental College, Lahore, where his father was President. In 1949, Rahbar went to Cambridge University and completed his PhD dissertationentitled Studies in the Ethical Doctrine of the Qur'an under the supervision of Reuben Levy. After a short time in Lahore, Rahbar accepted the position of Senior Teaching Fellow at McGill University, Canada, in 1954, at the invitation of Wilfred Cantwell Smith. In 1956 he was appointed to the chair of Urdu and Pakistan studies at Ankara University, Turkey, where he stayed until 1959. In 1959, he began lecturing in Islamic studies as well as enrolling in Christian theology seminars at the Hartford Seminary Foundation, Connecticut, USA.

In 1962, he was appointed Visiting Professor of Urdu and Pakistan studies at Hartford Seminary Foundation and was awarded tenure from 1962 to 1966. In 1964, he took a two-year leave to teach at University of Wisconsin–Madison, where he began a study of Indian and Western classical music, concentrating on achieving mastery of Indian classical vocal genres. In that same period, he began writing English poetry with the encouragement of David McCord and Louis Untermeyer.

In 1967, Rahbar joined the faculty of Boston University where he taught until his retirement in 1991: initially at the School of Theology and from 1975 onwards at the Department of Religion in the College of Liberal Arts.

== Lahore International Islamic Colloquium ==
On 2 January 1958, he presented a paper to the International Islamic Colloquium in Lahore, the second of its kind that brought scholars of Islamic subjects together from across the world. Rahbar's paper, entitled The Challenge of Muslim Ideas and Social Values to Muslim Society produced criticism from conference attendees, to the point that he was not allowed to return to the platform to explain his points.Rahbar maintains that it was "an innocent and mild statement" that he did not perceive to be "radically unorthodox." The opposing members of the conference asked the paper to be withdrawn later that day, but eventually agreed that an amended edition should be written. In the October 1958 issue of The Muslim World, the paper was published with an introductory note outlining the objections of the council and the amendments made thereafter. In his introductory note, Rahbar explained that much of the controversy was due to the inherent brevity of the statements. Therefore, he hoped that the expanded treatment would clarify those objections raised at the colloquium.

== Contributor to inter-civilisational and interfaith dialogue ==
Rahbar was raised as Muslim but converted to Christianity as a professor at Ankara University. He records in his memoir that he was baptised as a Christian by a Protestant United States Air Force Chaplain, Meredith Smith, in Ankara, on 6 July 1959. Rahbar noted that his conversion was not a result of the 1958 Colloquium, but was more closely related to the memories of Partition of India and the then environment in Turkey. He stated that the "categorical mercy" of the New Testament and the "Christian world seemed to...offer a spiritual home" from his growing pessimism. A couple of months later, Rahbar wrote A letter to Christian and Muslim Friends as a confession of faith.

This confession, however, was not fully accepted by some Muslim intellectuals. Khaled Ahmed, a Pakistani political and cultural analyst, stated that Rahbar's supposed conversion to Christianity was nothing more than a "myth created in Lahore" by those who did not fully understand "what he really stood for." He maintained that Rahbar's "entire career has been a defence of Islam" and that "anyone who has read his Kalchar Kay Ruhani Anasir (Spiritual Elements of Culture)" will no longer need to question his faith, but rather realise that "he is tolerant of all faiths because he had known the essence of them all."

In the published version of his dissertation, God of Justice: A Study in the Ethical Doctrine of the Qur'an published by E. J. Brill in 1960, Rahbar advanced the position that God's mercy is always subordinate to justice, so mercy is only available to believers.

== Contributions to poetry and classical music theory and composition ==
Throughout his academic career, Rahbar continued to make significant contributions to Urdu literature and music. He performed in concerts and poetry readings both in the United States and Pakistan. His love was for classical South Asian music, particularly the Agra School. His flair for poetic expression is infused throughout his autobiography, Memories and Meanings."Music has been my solace for the last forty years," he wrote. "Without it I perhaps could not have been a friend to myself and to others. Music and poetry have made life easier for me everywhere and at every stage of my adult life.". His published works in the field of Urdu literature include:

- Salaam o Payaam. Lahore: Sang-e-Meel Publications, 1996 – Letters to his friends and associates. Subsequent volumes were published in 2004 and 2009.
- Kalcar ke Ruhani Anasir. Lahore: Sang-e-Meel Publications, 1998 – Culture and Religion.
- Pragandah Taba' Log. Lahore: Sang-e-Meel Publications, 2000 – Short stories.
- Kulliyaat. Karachi: Pakistan Printers, 2001 – Complete poetical works of Daud Rahbar.
- Taslimaat. Lahore: Sang-e-Meel Publications, 2004 – Essays on Muslim culture in South Asia.
- "Gandhi and the Hindi-Urdu Question." In Indian Critiques of Gandhi. Edited by Harold Coward, p. 217–238. Albany: SUNY Press, 2003.

== Death ==
Daud Rahbar died at a nursing home in Deerfield Beach, Florida, United States, on 5 October 2013.

== Sources ==
- Rahbar, Daud (1985). Memories and Meanings. D. Rahbar.
