= Mohammad Daud =

Mohammad Daud is the name of:

- Mohammed Daoud Khan (1909–1978), overthrew the last King of Afghanistan
- Mohammed Daud Daud (1969–2011), Afghan soldier and politician
- Mohammad Daud Sultanzoy (1952–2015), Afghan politician
- Mohammad Daud Miraki (born 1967), Afghan writer and politician
- Mohammad bin Daud (born 1943), Brunei nobleman and politician
- Mohammed Daud Daud (born 1969), Afghan police chief

== See also ==
- Mohammad Daoud (disambiguation)
