= Jovan Deretić =

Serbian historian and university professor

- Born: January 22, 1934; Orovac, Kingdom of Yugoslavia
- Died: June 16, 2002 (aged 68); Belgrade, Serbia, FR Yugoslavia
- Years active: 1969–2002

Jovan Deretić (Serbian Cyrillic: Јован Деретић, [jǒʋan derětit͡ɕ]; 22 January 1934 – 16 June 2002) was a Serbian historian and author of Serbian literary history. His work Istorija Srpske književnosti (1983) is the standard work in Serbian literary history. He is sometimes confused with pseudohistorian Jovan I. Deretić.

Deretić was born in the village of Orahovac near Trebinje on 22 January 1934. He completed gymnasium high school in Trebinje and Vrbas and graduated from the Faculty of Philosophy, University of Belgrade in 1958. He completed his doctoral degree in Belgrade as well in 1965 with a thesis under the title "Composition of the Gorski Vijenac".

== Selected works ==
- Jovan Deretić (1969). Kompozicija Gorskog vijenca. Zavod za izdavanje udžbenika Socijalističke Republike Srbije. ISBN 9788676590827.
- Jovan Deretić (1978). Ogledi iz narodnog pesništva. Slovo ljubve.
- Jovan Deretić (1981). Srpski roman: 1800-1950. Nolit.
- Jovan Deretic (1983). Romantizam: studija i hrestomatija. Veselin Maslesa.
- Jovan Deretić (1987). Kratka istorija srpske književnosti. Beogradski izdavačko-grafički zavod. ISBN 9788613000600.
- Jovan Deretić (1989). Poetika prosvećivanja: književnost i nauka u delu Dositeja Obradovića. Književne novine. ISBN 9788639101732.
- Jovan Deretić (1996). Put srpske književnosti: identitet, granice, težnje. Srpska književna zadruga. ISBN 9788637906193.
- Jovan Deretić (1997). Poetika srpske književnosti. "Филип Вишњић. ISBN 9788673631875.
