= Saint Mark Coptic Orthodox Church (Heliopolis) =

Coptic Orthodox church in Cairo, Egypt

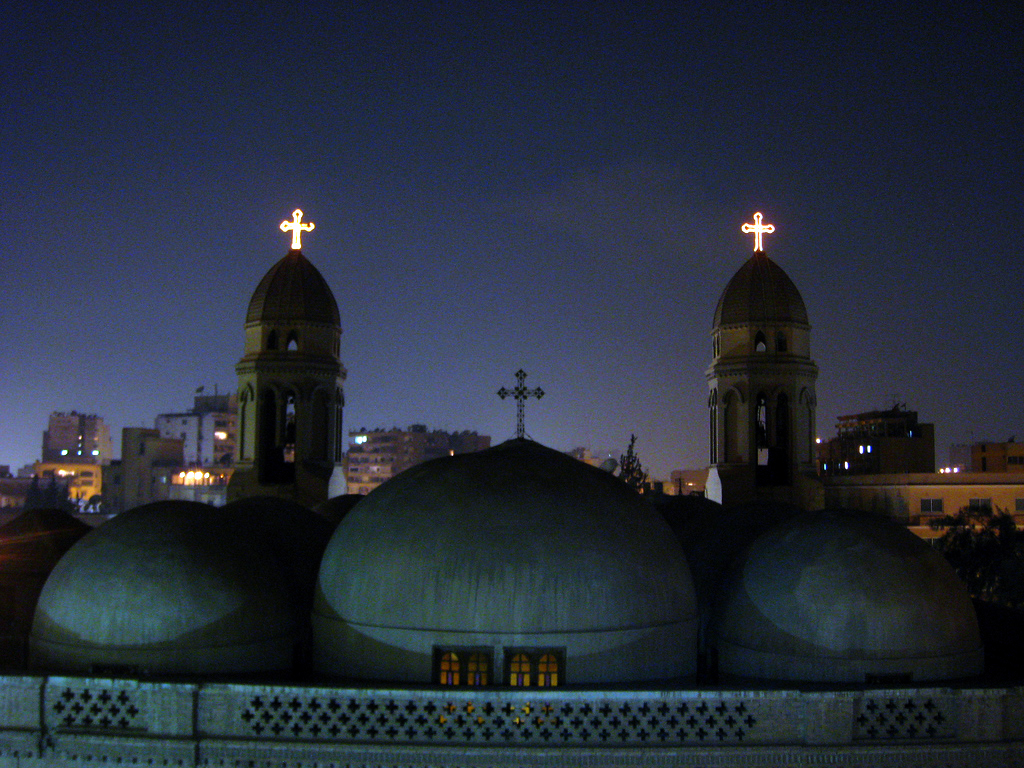
- The domes of Saint Mark's Church, standing over the horizon
- Saint Mark Coptic Orthodox Church
- 30°05′33″N 31°19′47″E
- Location: Cleopatra Street, Heliopolis, Cairo, Egypt
- Country: Egypt
- Denomination: Coptic Orthodox Church

History
- Status: Cathedral
- Founder: Pope Cyril V of Alexandria
- Dedication: Saint Mark
- Consecrated: 1930

Architecture
- Architectural type: Church
- Style: Coptic

Administration
- Division: The Coptic Orthodox Patriarchate

Clergy
- Bishop: Pope Tawadros II
- Priest(s): Fr Daoud Lamei and Fr Boules George

St. Mark's Coptic Orthodox Church is the first Coptic parish built in the district of Heliopolis in Cairo, Egypt. Located on Cleopatra Street near the Cleopatra Hospital, it serves as one of several Coptic Orthodox churches in Heliopolis.

== History ==
=== Establishment ===
The idea of establishing a church in Heliopolis began in 1917. A committee was formed, and the cornerstone was laid on Friday, 16 June 1922, under the papacy of Pope Cyril V. Prayers were held in a temporary location starting in January 1925 until construction was completed in 1930. The late Fr. Ibrahim Luke served as the first priest until his death in 1950. Today, nineteen priests serve Saint Mark's Church.

=== Expansion ===
Adjacent land was purchased in 1948 to build the church hall and chapel. It was opened by Pope Cyril VI on 5 June 1964, and the new altar was consecrated, bearing the name of Saint Menas.

== Notable clergy ==
Father Daoud Lamei has served at Saint Mark's Church since he was sixteen years old. He is a producer of videos and books on Coptic Orthodox teachings, and his sermons are presented on Coptic television channels and online platforms including YouTube.

== Papal visits ==
Several Coptic popes have visited Saint Mark's Church:

- Pope Joseph II: laid the cornerstone of the church hall
- Pope Cyril VI: visited in 1960 for prayer and in 1964 for the opening of the church hall
- Pope Shenouda III: visited in 1973 and 1981 for preaching, and in 2000 to commemorate the 50th anniversary of Fr. Ibrahim Luke's death

== See also ==
- Christian Egypt
- List of Coptic Orthodox churches in Egypt
