= Daud =

- Pronunciation: Arabic: [daː.wuːd] Persian: [dɒː.vuːd]
- Gender: Male
- Language: Arabic

Origin
- Origin: Hebrew
- Meaning: David

Other names
- Alternative spelling: Dawud, Dawood, Daoud, Davud, Davut
- Variant forms: Davud (Persian), Davut (Turkish)
- Related names: David

Daud (Arabic: داوود) is a male Arabic given name and surname corresponding to David. The Persian form is Davud or Davoud. Other variant spellings in the Latin alphabet include Da'ud, Daut, Daoud, Dawud, Dawood, Davood, Daood and Davut. The meaning of Daud is "Dear", "Beloved" or Cherished one. The name "Daud" is one of those that is used by all the Abrahamic Religions (Islam, Christianity, Judaism).

== People with this given name ==
- David in Islam (c. 1043 BC - 937 BC?), referred to variously as Daud, Dawud, Dawood, etc.; the king David of Israel in Islam, considered to be a Prophet and Messenger of Allah.
- Daud Abdullah (born 1955), Grenadian-British researcher and scholar
- Daud Khan Achakzai, Pakistani politician
- Daud Ali (born 1964), American historian
- Dawda Bah (born 1983), Gambian association footballer
- Daud Beureu'eh (1899–1987), Acehnese military leader
- Daud Bolad (died 1992), Sudanese politician and rebel leader
- Daouda Compaoré (born 1973), Burkinabé association football player
- Daúd Gazale (born 1984), Chilean former footballer
- Daud Haider (1952–2025), Bangladeshi poet
- Daoud Hanania (born 1934), Jordanian heart surgeon and politician
- Daud Abdulle Hirsi (1925–1965), Somali military leader
- Daud Ibrahim (1947–2010), Malaysian cyclist
- Dawood Ibrahim (born 1955), Indian organised crime leader
- Daouda Jabi (born 1981), Guinean association footballer
- Dawda Jawara (born 1924), Gambian statesman, prime minister and later president
- Daud Junbish, Afghan journalist
- Daud Kamal (1935–1987), Pakistani English literature professor
- Dauda Kamara, Sierra Leonean politician
- Dawud of Kanem, 14th-century Kanem leader
- Daud Khan Karrani (died 1576), Bengali military leader
- David XI of Kartli (died c. 1579), King of Kartli
- Mohammed Daoud Khan (1909–1978), Afghan statesman, prime minister and later president
- Daud Khan (cricketer) (1912–1979), Pakistani cricket player and umpire
- Daud Ali Khan (died 1883), Nawab of Masulipatam in India
- Daud Abdihakim Omar, Somali politician and government minister
- Daud Mohamed Omar, Somali politician and government minister
- Daud Khan Panni (died 1715), Mughul commander and later Nawab of the Carnatic region of south India
- Daud Bandagi Kirmani, 16th-century Indian saint
- Daud Mirza (1969–2014), Pakistani-Norwegian actor
- Dawud M. Mu'Min (1953–1997), American convicted murderer
- Daud Rahbar (1926–2013), Pakistani-American writer, musicologist, and scholar
- Dawood Olad Al-Seyed (born 1953), Moroccan film director
- Daoud Soumain (died 2008), Chadian military leader
- Daoud Mustafa Khalid (1917–2008), Sudanese neurologist.
- Dawud Salahuddin (born 1950), American Muslim terrorist
- Daud Khan Undiladze, 17th century Iranian military commander and politician
- Daouda Malam Wanké (c. 1950–2004), Nigerien military and political leader
- Dawud Wharnsby (born 1972), Canadian singer-songwriter

== People with this surname ==
- J. B. Dauda (born 1942), Sierra Leonean politician and government minister
- Darni M Daud (born 1961), Indonesian university administrator
- Kamilou Daouda (born 1987), Nigerien footballer
- Muhammed Dawood (disambiguation), several people
- N. J. Dawood (1927–2014), Iraqi translator
- Parviz Davoodi (born 1952), Iranian politician
- Roselan Daud (born 1961), Bruneian politician
- Siraj Mehfuz Daud (1931–2010), Indian judge
- Sulaiman Daud (1933–2010), Malaysian politician and government minister
- Zulekha Daud, Indian hospital administrator
