= Dawood =

Dawood may refer to:

- David in Islam
- Daud, a male given name and surname
- Dawood Group, a Pakistani holding company
- Dawood Public School, an educational institution in Karachi, Pakistan
- The Dawood Foundation, a Pakistani nonprofit family foundation
- Dawood University of Engineering & Technology, a public university in Karachi
- Shezad Dawood (born 1974), British visual artist, of Pakistani and Indian heritage

== See also ==
- Daoud (disambiguation)
- Daud (disambiguation)
- Dawud (disambiguation)
- Dagwood (disambiguation)
- David (disambiguation)
- Davood, Persian name
- Dawoud, Arabic name
