= Daud (disambiguation) =

Daud is the Arabic name of David, notably David in Islam. It can also be spelled Dawood or Dawud.

Daud may also refer to:

- Daud (film), a 1997 Indian action film by Ram Gopal Varma, starring Sanjay Dutt and Urmila Matondkar
- Daud, Nepal
- Daud, a character from the Dishonored franchise
- Hakim Daud (died 1662/63), a physician in Safavid Iran and Mughal India

== See also ==
- Daoud (disambiguation)
- Dawood (disambiguation)
- Dawud (disambiguation)
- David (disambiguation)
- Dawoud, Arabic name
