= Donji Orahovac, Trebinje =

Donji Orovac
- Village
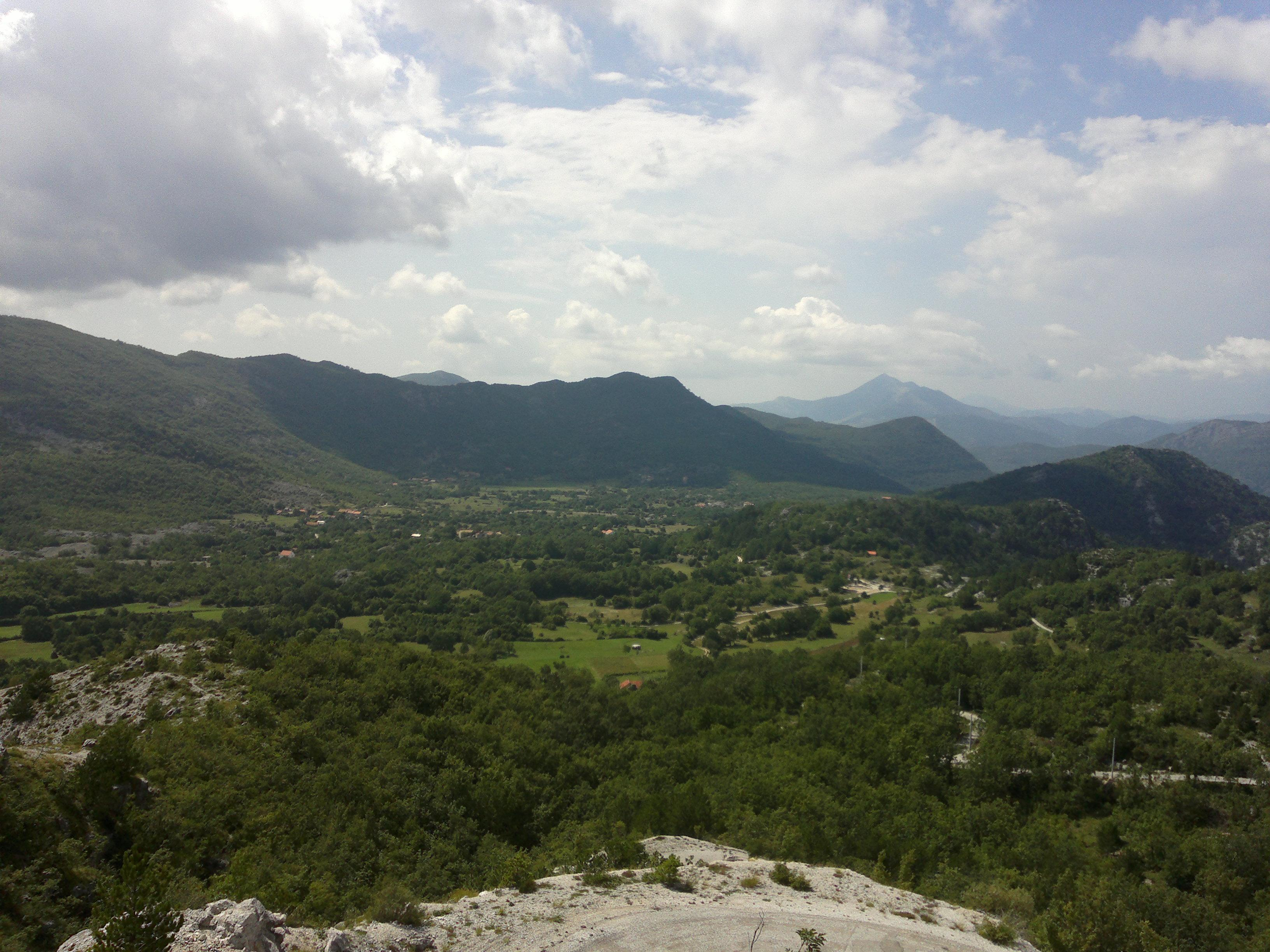

- Location within Bosnia and Herzegovina
- Coordinates: 42°40′47″N 18°29′00″E
- Country: Bosnia and Herzegovina
- Entity: Republika Srpska
- Municipality: Trebinje

Area
  - Total: 1.4 sq mi (3.5 km^{2})
- Elevation: 2,100 ft (640 m)
- Time zone: UTC+1 (CET)
  - Summer (DST): UTC+2 (CEST)
- Postal code: 89208
- Area code: +387 59

Donji Orovac (Serbian Cyrillic: Доњи Оровац) is a village in the municipality of Trebinje, Republika Srpska, Bosnia and Herzegovina.

== Notable people ==
- Jovan Deretić, Serbian historian and author of Serbian literary history
- Jovan I. Deretić, Serbian publicist, writer and pseudohistorian
