= Zulekha Daud =

India businesswoman

Dr. Zulekha Daud
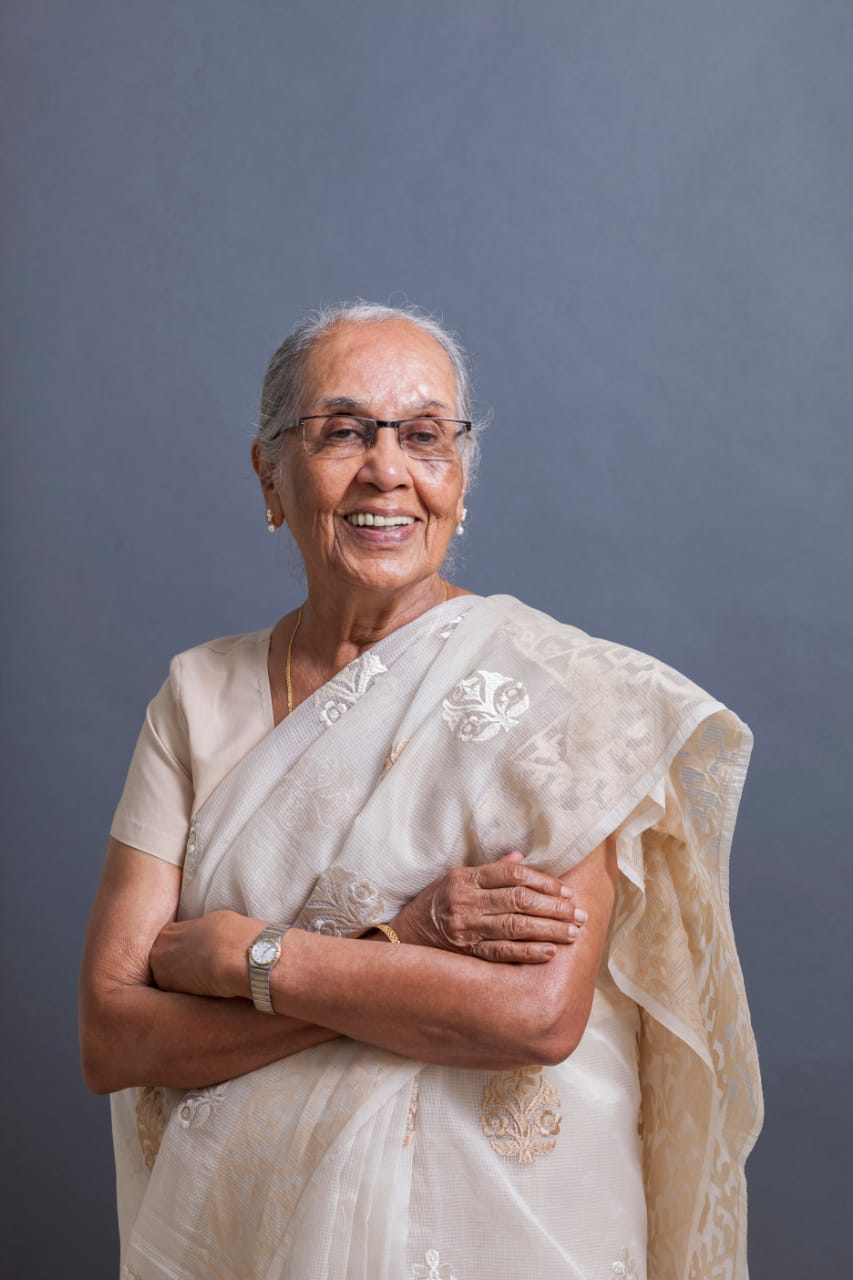
- Born: Nagpur, India
- Education: MBBS
- Occupations: Founder, Chairperson of Zulekha Healthcare Group including Zulekha Hospital United Arab Emirates Alexis Multispeciality Hospital, India, Zulekha Colleges, India.
- Years active: 1964- present
- Known for: Efforts in the field of healthcare
- Relatives: Husband - Dr. Iqbal Daud
- Medical career
- Profession: Doctor
- Field: Healthcare
- Website: zulekhahospitals.com

Zulekha Daud is an Indian physician who chairs the Zulekha Healthcare Group, which runs health care facilities in India and the UAE.

== Life and career ==
Zulekha Daud was born into the family of a construction worker. She graduated with a Bachelor of Medicine, Bachelor of Surgery degree from the Government Medical College in Nagpur, India. She specialised in gynaecology.

Daud moved to the UAE in 1964, becoming the first female Indian doctor to practice there. She first worked at the American Kuwait Mission Hospital, while her husband Dr. Iqbal Daud was an ophthalmologist in Ras Al Khaimah. Before the federation was formed in 1971, facilities in the UAE were basic, some areas lacked electricity and supplies; The equipment Zulekha had to use were rudimentary. She has attended to more than 10,000 deliveries across her career and it is her work in this field that earned her the moniker ‘Mama Zulekha’.

The first Zulekha Hospital was set up in Sharjah, in 1992. It began as a 30-bed facility and the Zulekha Group has now expanded to include another hospital in Dubai along with 3 medical centers and a chain of pharmacies. Today, the Zulekha Group is one of the largest private healthcare networks in the Emirates. Between the two hospitals and three medical centers, the Zulekha Group treats about 550,000 people annually.

In 2016, Daud established a 200-bed multispeciality hospital in her hometown, Nagpur, known as Alexis Multispeciality Hospital. The hospital is an offering and initiative of Daud to help serve the entire Central India community.

In 2004, Daud set up Zed – a vocational and training center and a charitable trust in Nagpur. Her other efforts in India include the ‘Clean Drinking Water’ cause engineered in and around Nagpur. She has also begun adopting non-functional educational institutes around the area.

In 2010, Daud put together a financing deal of $24 million with the IFC, a member of the World Bank Group to offer hospital care in India and the UAE. According to the plan presented, $21 million would be put toward a strong hospital in Nagpur, India and $3 million would go toward an energy-efficiency project in the Zulekha group's Sharjah facility.

== Awards and recognition ==
- 2012: International Women's Day excellence award on the 11th International Women's Day Excellence Awards in Dubai.
- 2012: Recognised as one of the top gynaecologists in the UAE and honoured by Sheikh Dr. Majid Bin Saeed Al Nuaimi, Chairman of the Ruler's Court (Ajman) at the National Conference on Women's Health at Gulf Medical University (GMU) Campus.
- 2012: Lifetime Achievement – Healthcare Award.
- 2013: Zulekha Daud placed 20th in the Economic Times' 2013 list of Most powerful Indian in the Gulf.
- 2013: Placed in Forbes Middle East top 100 Indian leaders in the UAE.
- 2015: Listed as one of the 20 most influential global Indian women.
- 2015: Outstanding Contribution of an Individual to the Middle East Healthcare Industry Award.
- Ranked 33 in arabianbusiness.com’s list of 50 richest Indians in the GCC.
- 2015: Dubai Quality Award at the 21st Business Excellence Awards Ceremony. This was recognised by the Sheikh Mohammed Bin Rashid Al Maktoum, Vice President and Prime Minister of the UAE and Ruler of Dubai.
- Sheikh Abdullah bin Zayed Al Nahyan, Minister of Foreign Affairs and International Cooperation recognized and honored Daud, Founder and Chairperson of Zulekha Healthcare Group in New Delhi and presented her with a letter of thanks and appreciation of her five decades of valuable contributions to the healthcare sector in the UAE and her tireless efforts to boost welfare levels for UAE citizens and residents.
- Daud was honoured with the Lifetime Achievement Award at the Republic TV Gulf Indian Leadership Summit and Awards 2018 for her humanitarian work. The award was presented by Shri Rajyavardhan Rathore, Indian Minister of State for Youth Affair & Sports and Minister of State for Information & Broadcasting and Mr. Arnab Goswami, Editor in Chief, Republic TV.

== Pravasi Bharatiya Samman ==
Year	Country of residence	Recognized by	Given by	Field of Merit
2019	UAE	President of India	Ramnath Kovind	Medical Science & Business
