= Suzanne de Nervèze =

17th century French writer

Suzanne de Nervèze was a French writer of the 17th century, considered part of the French literary style and movement known as préciosité, sometimes known under the pseudonyms of Némésis and Nérésie.

== Biography ==
The date of birth of Suzanne de Nervèze is unknown. She was probably born around 1600 judging from her date of death, in 1666. No information is given about her parents. She probably had a brother called Antoine de Nervèze who was also a writer, but it also likely that he was her uncle. In the same family, there is Guillaume-Bernard de Nervèze, the elder brother of Antoine. If they are related, they both come from the Languedoc, in the South of France. Suzanne lived in Paris, but her address is unknown. The only thing she tells about herself poverty despite the pensions paid to her by the cardinal. Moreover, she insists on the fact that she was not a cultured woman, and that's why she moved away from the Court.

Suzanne wrote many letters during her life, mostly during the Fronde of 1648–1653, because she was the Cardinal Mazarin's favorite. She wasn't really known during her activity, some writers wrote about her but in a mocking way and today only few studies mention her.

== Writings ==
Suzanne wrote thirty works on different subjects. Her first work is a novel entitled La Nouvelle Armide, was published in 1644, and is the only fictional work she produced during her active years, (1636 at 1662). Most of her works concern the Fronde, with an important aspect of the Christian religion, and she asks peace in many letters because the civil war is to hard for the parisians . One of her works concerns the states of women and the feminines qualities Apologie en faveur des femmes, published in 1642.

Her writings are quite short, generally between ten and fifty pages. She dedicates them to influential people, like Anne d'Autriche, Princess Palatine, the Duke of Orléans, or Louis XIV. Suzanne then served the monarchy, a fact gleaned from her letters, in which she expresses excessive flattery towards to her recipients. Her contemporaries reproached her for this habit, Hubert Carrier addresses this in his work Les Muses guerrières. Les Mazarinades et la vie littéraire au milieu du XVII^{e} siècle : courants, genres, culture populaire et savante à l'époque de la Fronde.

== Works ==
- Nervèze, Suzanne de, Apologie en faveur des femmes (Paris, 1642, Jean Paslé)
- Nervèze, Suzanne de, Lettre d'une bourgeoise de la Paroisse Saint-Eustache (Paris, 1649, Guillaume Sassier)
- Nervèze, Suzanne de, La Monarchie Affligée avec ses consolations politiques et chrétiennes. A Monseigneur le prince de Conty (Paris, 1649)
- Nervèze, Suzanne de, Discours présenté à la reyne régente pour la paix (Paris, 1649)
- Nervèze, Suzanne de, Le Te Deum des Dames de la Cour et de la ville, en actions de grâces de la paix et l'heureuse arrivée de Leurs Majestés dans leur bonne ville de Paris (Paris, 1649)
- Nervèze, Suzanne de, Le Rieur de la Cour (Paris, 1659)
- Nervèze, Suzanne de, La Nouvelle Armide (Paris)
- Nervèze, Suzanne de, Le panégyrique royal, présenté à Leurs Majestés à Compiègne, le 14 juillet 1649 (Paris, 1649)
- Nervèze, Suzanne de, Le resonement chrestien sur les vertus cardinales. Dédié à Monseigneur le cardinal Mazarin. Par Madamoiselle de Nerveze (Paris, 1644)
- Nervèze, Suzanne de, Au Roy, sur l'auguste sacre & couronnement de Sa Majesté (Paris, 1654)
