= Davood Younesi =

Davood Younesi داوود یونسی
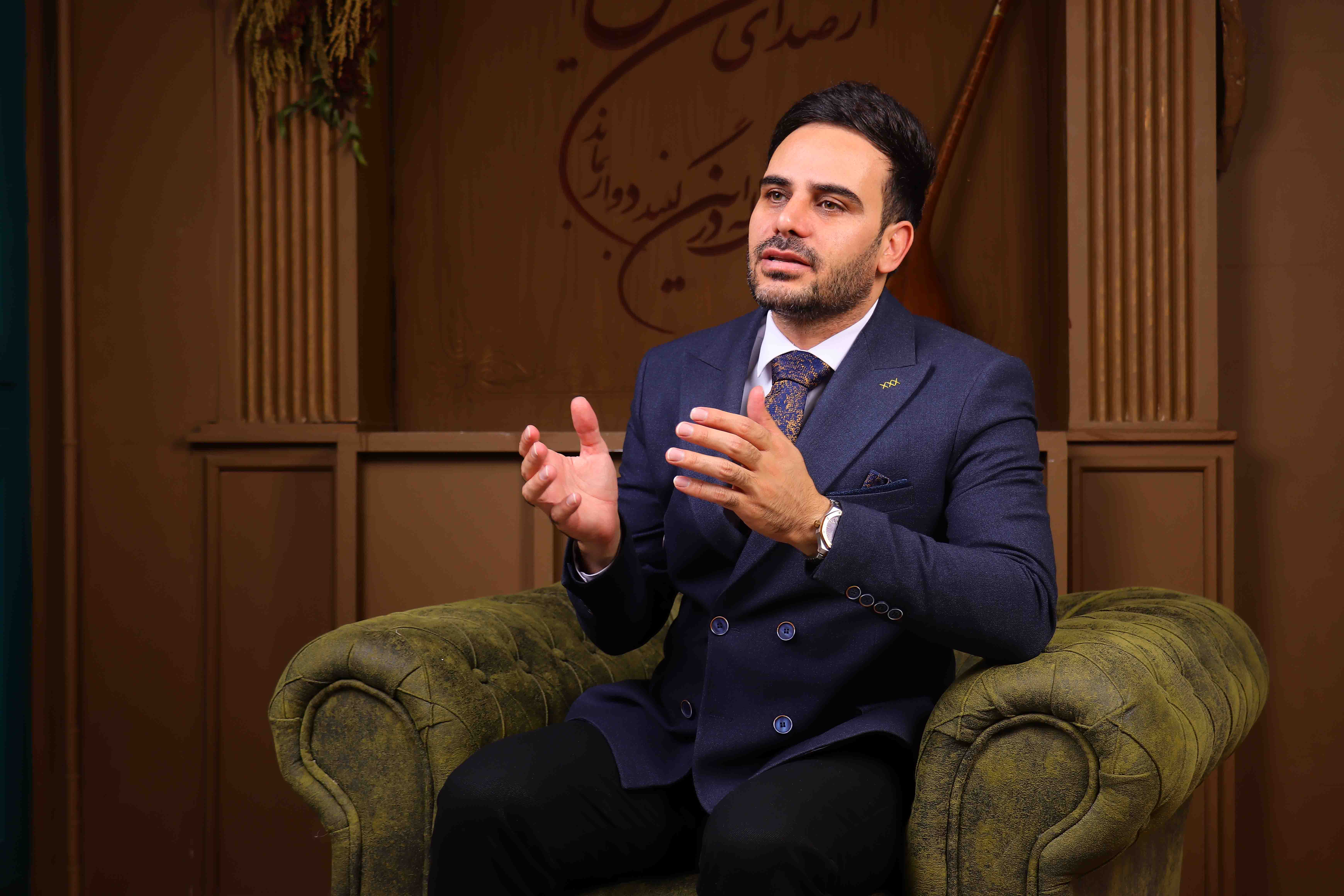
- Davood Younesi in July 2024

Background information
- Born: 11 November 1990 (age 35); Quchan, Razavi Khorasan province, Iran
- Genres: Iranian Pop; Folk-pop; Music of Khorasan region
- Occupations: Singer; Songwriter; Composer; poet; Dutar maker
- Instruments: Singing; Dutar; keyboard
- Years active: 2014–present
- Website: https://davoodyounesi.com/

Davood Younesi (Persian: داوود یونسی; born 11 November 1990) is an Iranian singer, songwriter, musician, and music researcher from the Khorasan region. He is known for traditional Khorasan music and contemporary folk pop, making him a prominent figure in the Iranian music scene. His Kurmanji piece "Refsh Chawe Le Delbere" gained significant international attention, even being featured in the Turkish newspaper Ufuk.

== Early life and musical influences ==
Younesi was born in Quchan, Iran.
