= Daud Abdihakim Omar =

State Minister of National Security of Somalia
- Incumbent
- Assumed office 17 January 2014
- Prime Minister: Abdiweli Sheikh Ahmed

Daud Abdihakim Omar is a Somali politician. He is the State Minister of National Security of Somalia, having been appointed to the position on 17 January 2014 by Prime Minister Abdiweli Sheikh Ahmed.
