= Athénée Louisianais =

American francophone literary society

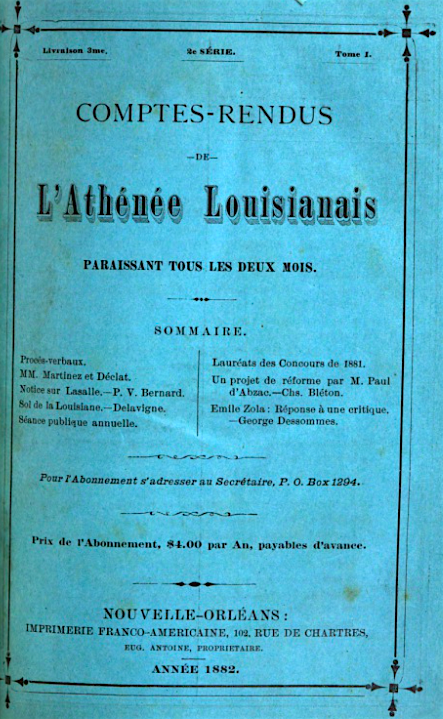
1882 issue of Comptes-Rendus de l'Athénée Louisianais

The Athénée Louisianais was a francophone literary society founded in New Orleans, Louisiana, in 1876. Its mission was to promote the French language and literature in Louisiana during a period of increasing anglicization following the American Civil War. The society became a focal point for intellectual and cultural life among Louisiana's Creole elite and played a significant role in preserving Louisiana French and Francophone literature in the region.

== History ==
The Athénée Louisianais was established in 1876 by prominent figures including P. G. T. Beauregard, Oliver Carrière, Paul Fourchy, J. G. Hava, Auguste Jas, Sabin Martin, Alfred Mercier, Armand Mercier, Léona Queyrouze, and Charles Turpin. Its creation reflected a broader movement among Louisiana Creoles to maintain French cultural identity during the Reconstruction era. By 1913, its headquarters were in the Hibernia Bank Building on Gravier Street.

== Activities ==
The society held regular meetings featuring lectures, debates, and readings of literary works. It organized public lectures by notable French intellectuals such as Eugène Brieux, Hugues Le Roux, Henri de Régnier, and Firmin Roz, which helped connect Louisiana's French-speaking community to contemporary European thought.

In 1878, the Athénée Louisianais launched an annual literary contest to encourage original writing in French. Winning essays were published in its official journal, Comptes-Rendus de l'Athénée Louisianais, which appeared from 1876 to 1921 and included essays, poems, and transcriptions of lectures.

== Publications ==
Comptes-Rendus de l'Athénée Louisianais served as a major outlet for French-language writing in Louisiana. It published scholarly articles, creative works, and linguistic studies, including Alfred Mercier’s influential essay on Louisiana Creole language.

== Cultural influence ==
The Athénée Louisianais was part of a broader effort to sustain French cultural traditions in Louisiana. It collaborated with organizations such as the Alliance française and, by 1929, was affiliated with the Fédération de l'Alliance française. Its activities contributed to the preservation of French Louisiana identity and influenced writers associated with the Creole literature movement.

== Archival collections ==
Records of the Athénée Louisianais, including meeting minutes, correspondence, and unpublished manuscripts, are held by:

- Tulane University – Louisiana Research Collection
- The Historic New Orleans Collection – Athénée Louisianais records

== See also ==
- Francophone literature
- Literature of Louisiana
- Louisiana French
- French Louisiana
- Creole literature

== Bibliography ==
- Alcée Fortier (1904). "French literature of Louisiana". History of Louisiana. Goupil & Co. pp. 259+.
- Alcée Fortier (1914). "Athénée Louisianais". Louisiana: Comprising Sketches of Parishes, Towns, Events, Institutions, and Persons. Century Historical Association.
- Ruby Van Allen Caulfield (1929). French Literature of Louisiana. Columbia University.
- Rien Fertel (2014). Imagining the Creole City: The Rise of Literary Culture in Nineteenth-Century New Orleans. Louisiana State University Press. pp. 49–70. ISBN 978-0-8071-5824-1.
