= David Daoud =

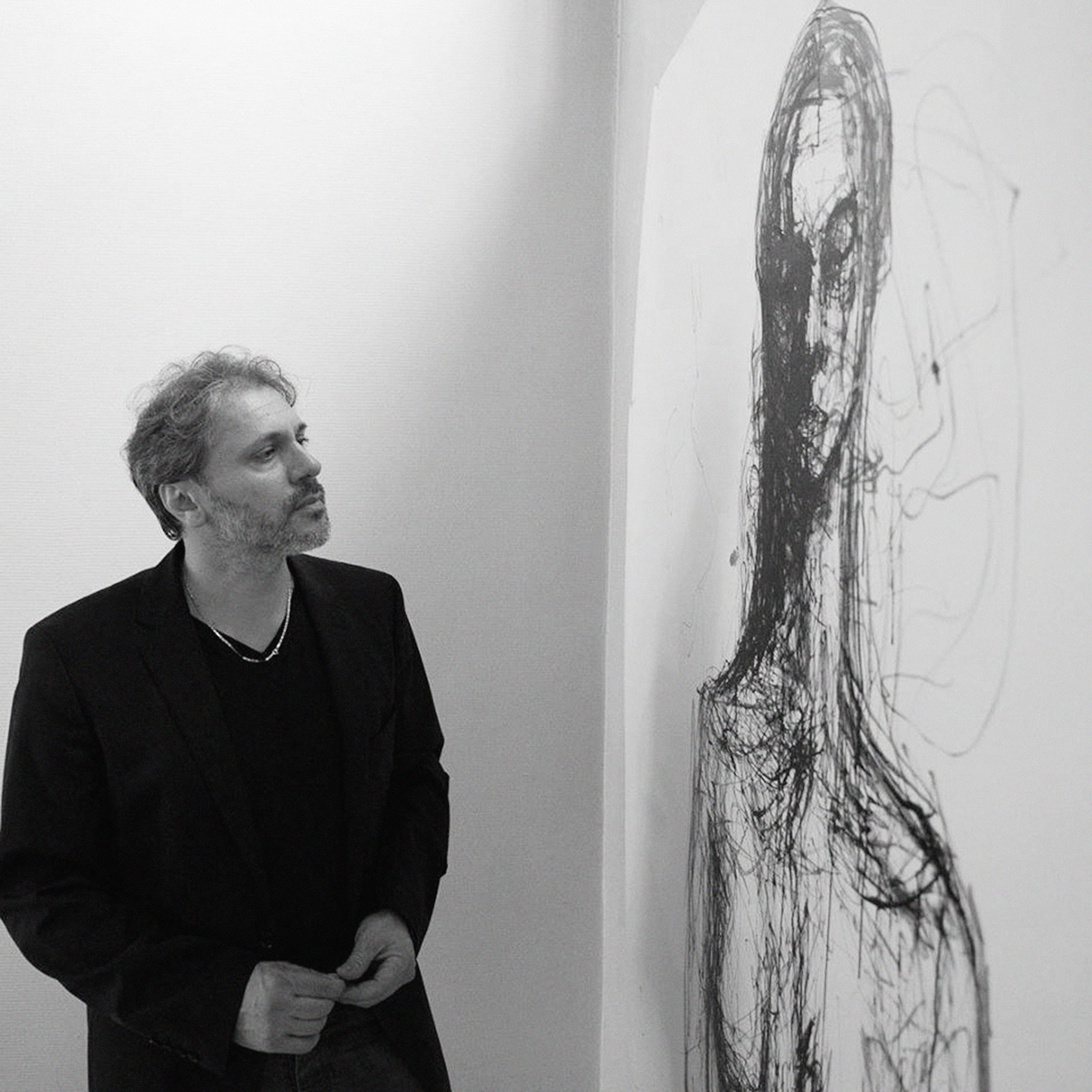
- Born: 4 January 1970 (age 56); Beirut, Lebanon
- Website: https://www.daviddaoud.com

David Daoud is a Lebanese-born French painter. He lives and works in Paris and Beirut.

== Biography ==
David Daoud was born on 4 January 1970 in Beirut, Lebanon. Daoud and his family left Lebanon because of the Lebanese Civil War and moved to France in 1983. He attended the Beaux-Arts de Paris and after that enrolled at the École nationale supérieure des arts décoratifs and studied with Charles Auffret. In 2011, Daoud received the Frédéric de Carfort prize from the Fondation de France. He illustrated the cover of the album Levantine Symphony by Ibrahim Maalouf.

== Exhibitions ==
=== Solo ===
- 2024: David Daoud - Les jardins de l'âme, Galerie Murmure, Colmar, Fr
- 2022: David Daoud - Peindre au soleil noir de la mélancolie, Galerie Cheriff Tabet, Beirut
- 2022: David Daoud - Rêve d'absolu, Galerie de l'Europe, Paris, Fr
- 2021: David Daoud - Invitation au voyage, Galerie Murmure, Colmar, Fr
- 2020: Institut du Monde Arabe, Paris, Fr
- 2020: GALLERY DANIELLE BOURDETTE Gorzkowski, Honfleur, Germany
- 2020: David Daoud - Horizon lointain, Liège, Belgium
- 2019: David Daoud - De l'art pariétal à la création contemporaine, Museum of Lebanese Prehistory, Beirut
- 2019: Jacques Prévert Theatre and Cinema, Mers-les-Bains, Fr
- 2018: David Daoud : Les Paysages éphémères - Les Empreintes, œuvres graphiques - Les Dialogues, Galerie Danielle Bourdette-Gorzkowski, Honfleur, Germany
- 2018: David Daoud - Visions poétiques, 3rd arrondissement of Paris, Paris, Fr
- 2018: Solo Atelier, Saint-Leu-la-Forêt, Fr
- 2016: Le voyage de Daoud, Exode Gallery, Beirut

=== Group ===
- 2023: Les peintres de l'atelier, Maison de l'Etang, Louveciennes, Fr
