= Mohammad Daoud =

Mohammad Daoud may refer to:

- Mohammed Daoud Khan (1909–1978), first president of Afghanistan, from 1973, until his assassination in 1978
- Mohammad Daoud (governor), former governor of Helmand Province, Afghanistan
- Mohammad Al-Abbasi (Mohammad Daoud, 1914–1972), Jordanian military figure and prime minister
- Mohammed Daoud, Moroccan writer and historian
- Abu Daoud (c. 1936–2010), one of the leaders the Black September movement
- Mohammad Daoud, minister of Culture (Lebanon), 2019–2020

== See also ==
- Mohammad Daud (disambiguation)
