= Édouard Dessommes =

American French language writer

Édouard Dessommes (New Orleans, November 17, 1845 – Mandeville, 1908) was an American French language writer.

Born in New Orleans, he went to a French school in Paris when he was 14 years old, following the custom of Louisiana Creoles, and in order to escape from American Civil War. He studied medicine and later started to publish his books. He was a professor at the Tulane University, but disappointed because of his literacy failure, he chose to live as a hermit in Mandeville.

== Works ==
- Femme et Statue, 1869
- Jacques Morel, 1870
- Comptes Rendus, 1891
