= Daoud Lamei =

Egyptian Coptic Orthodox priest

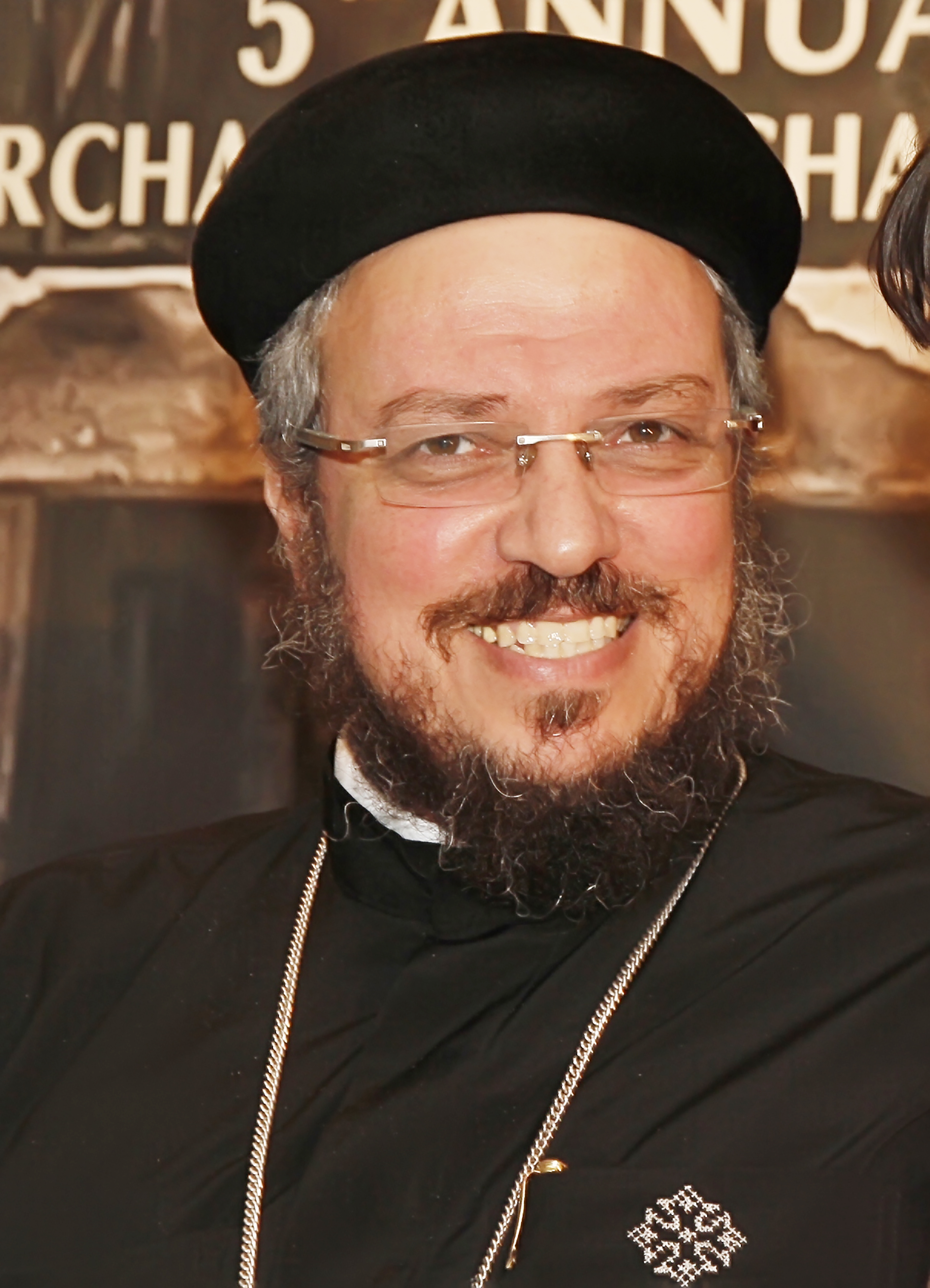
Fr Daoud Lamei

Father Daoud Lamei, also spelt Dawood Lamey or Lamie (Arabic: داود لمعى), born 1962, is a Coptic Orthodox priest and the current leader of the parish of Saint Mark Church in Heliopolis, Cairo, Egypt.

== Early life ==
His name before ordination was Deacon Doctor Basem Lamei Ashamallah. was born in Cairo on 11 March 1962. His mother and father also held positions in the church. Before his ordination, Daoud, together with his brother and sister, served in Saint Mark's Coptic Orthodox Church in Heliopolis. He completed his Sunday School Preparatory studies in 1978. He then started serving in the church's Sunday Schools firstly by teaching children, first of primary school age, then preparatory school age and finally of secondary school age.

Subsequently, he was appointed as Deputy Superintendent of the Pre-Servants Preparation course while at the same time serving in the Saint Stephen's Medical Church Group, which was founded by students in the Faculty of Medicine, and supervised by Bishop Moussa. He played music as a recreation.

== Education and Work ==
He graduated from the Faculty of Medicine in 1985, then served in the Graduate Physicians’ Meeting. He received his Dermatology Master's degree in 1990, and worked as a dermatologist for 13 years. Then joined the army as a Reserve Officer in 1987 where he remained for two and a half years.

Daoud Lamei also served refugees in Egypt, and Shortly before his ordination, he started serving in the ministry of the slums (around 1985).

== Marriage and Ordination ==
He married Tasoni Shereen. A few years later, he was chosen to be ordained as a priest in the United States of America. Pope Shenouda approved his ordination and appointed him to serve in America, but Fr Daoud and his wife preferred to remain in Egypt.On Monday 8 June 1998, Father Daoud was ordained by Pope Shenouda III in the Church of Saint Abba Shenouda the Archimandrite in Saint Pishoi's Monastery, Wady El Natroun, Egypt. And on Tuesday 11 May 2010, Father Daoud was promoted to the rank of Hegumen also by Pope Shenouda III.

== Service ==
Father Daoud serves in Saint Mark's Coptic Orthodox Church in Cleopatra, Heliopolis, Egypt in a variety of ministries. He has published numerous works, some of which have been translated into English and French. As well as send many voluntary mission to help those in need in different countries, many of them were in Africa, such as Kenya and South Africa.

Father Daoud presents various programmes on Coptic Channels such as CTV, Aghapy, ME Sat, CYC, Logos TV.

== Books ==
Fr Daoud Lamei has written many books, such as: Arabic Books 1-The Cries of A Priest 2-Meditations On Nehemiah 3-Why The Pain 4-Studying the Bible 5-Meditations On Life Of Joseph 6-Meditations On Micah 7-Can You Believe?! 8-Service Is The Solution 9-Development In Service 10-Religious & But 11-Jacob In The Hands Of Potter 12-Meditations Of Adam’s Life 13-How ? 14-The Holy Eucharist 15-Why? 16-Orthodox Do Not Cheat On It 17-The Life Of David The Prophet 18-Limitation Of Obedience & Sub
