= Muhammed Dawood =

Muhammed Dawood may refer to:

- Muhammed Dawood, alias for Guantanamo detainee David Hicks
- Mohammed Dawood (Bagram detainee), one of the detainees whose amalgamated habeas corpus petition is known as Ghulam Mohammed v. Don Rumsfeld
- Mohammed Dawood Yaseen (born 2000), Iraqi footballer
