= Dawood Olad Al-Seyed =

Moroccan film director, screenwriter, and photographer

- Born: April 14, 1953 (age 72); Morocco, Marrakesh
- Occupations: Moroccan film director, screenwriter, photographer

Dawood Olad Al-Seyed (Arabic: داوود اولاد السيد; born April 14, 1953, in Marrakesh), is a Moroccan film director, screenwriter, and photographer.
