= Letters of Ghalib =

Ghalib in Nastaliq

The Letters of Ghalib (Khutoot-e-Ghalib) is the compilation of Mirza Ghalib's letters. One of the greatest Urdu-Persian poets of all time, Ghalib was also a passionate and serious writer of letters. The distinguishing quality of Ghalib's epistolary practice was the energy and intimacy of conversational language that he could deploy with great finesse even in the written text of the letter. The letters have served as crucial windows into the history of Delhi's destruction by the British forces in vengeance for the 1857 mutiny, besides giving insights into Ghalib's own poetic practice.

His letters were very informal, sometimes he just wrote the name of the person and commenced the letter.

Ghalib was a chronicler of a turbulent period. One by one, Ghalib saw the bazaars – Khas Bazaar, Urdu Bazaar, Kharam-ka Bazaar, disappear, whole mohallas (localities) and katras (lanes) vanish. The havelis (mansions) of his friends were razed. Ghalib wrote that Delhi had become a desert. Water was scarce. Delhi was now “a military camp”. It was the end of the ashraf social section, captured in the shahrashob trope of his letters. He wrote in his famous lament:

ہے موجزن اک قلزم خوں کاش یہی ہو

آتا ہے ابھی دیکھیے کیا کیا مرے آگے

"An ocean of blood churns around me-
Alas! Were these all!
The future will show
What more remains for me to see."
