= Ahmad Daoud =

Syrian writer in the 20th century

- Born: 1942; Tell Huwairi, Latakia, Syria
- Occupations: Researcher; Writer; Historian
- Years active: 1963–

Ahmad Daoud (Arabic: أحمد داوود; born 1942) is a Syrian researcher, writer and historian.

== Life ==
Daoud was born in the village of Tell Huwairi in the Jableh region of Latakia Governorate in 1942. He obtained a master's degree in literature, then a PhD in Film Scenario, and a PhD in Ancient Syrian History. He worked in teaching and journalism, and as a cultural advisor in the Syrian Foreign Ministry. He became a member of the Research and Studies Association, a member of the Arab Writers Union, and an honorary member of the Moroccan Historians Association. Daoud worked as head of the Historical Department and head of the Media Department at the Center for Strategic Research and Studies at the University of Damascus. Ahmed Daoud is one of the founders of the Coalition of Thinkers Against Forgery.
