= Davood Moradian =

Afghan politician

محمد داوود مرادیان Dr. Davood Moradian

Personal details
- Born: Herat, Afghanistan
- Education: University of London; University of St. Andrews

Dr. Davood Moradian is an Afghan politician. He served as Chief of Presidential Programs for President Hamid Karzai's office, and Senior Policy Adviser to the Minister of Foreign Affairs in the Afghan capital Kabul. He also worked as Head of the Strategic Studies Center under the Foreign Ministry. He is currently the General Director of Afghan Institute for Strategic Studies (AISS).

Moradian was born in Herat Province, in western Afghanistan. He comes from a Tajik an ethnic background. He completed his undergraduate studies at the University of London, in the fields of international relations and international law. He obtained his Ph.D. degree from University of St. Andrews in Scotland, where he also taught international relations. His thesis focused on a comparative study of the conception of punishment in the traditions of ancient Greece, Islam and international criminal justice. He is fluent in Persian and English, and also knows some Pashto.
