= Jovan I. Deretić =

Serbian publicist and writer (1939–2021)

Jovan Ilić Deretić
- Јован Илић Деретић
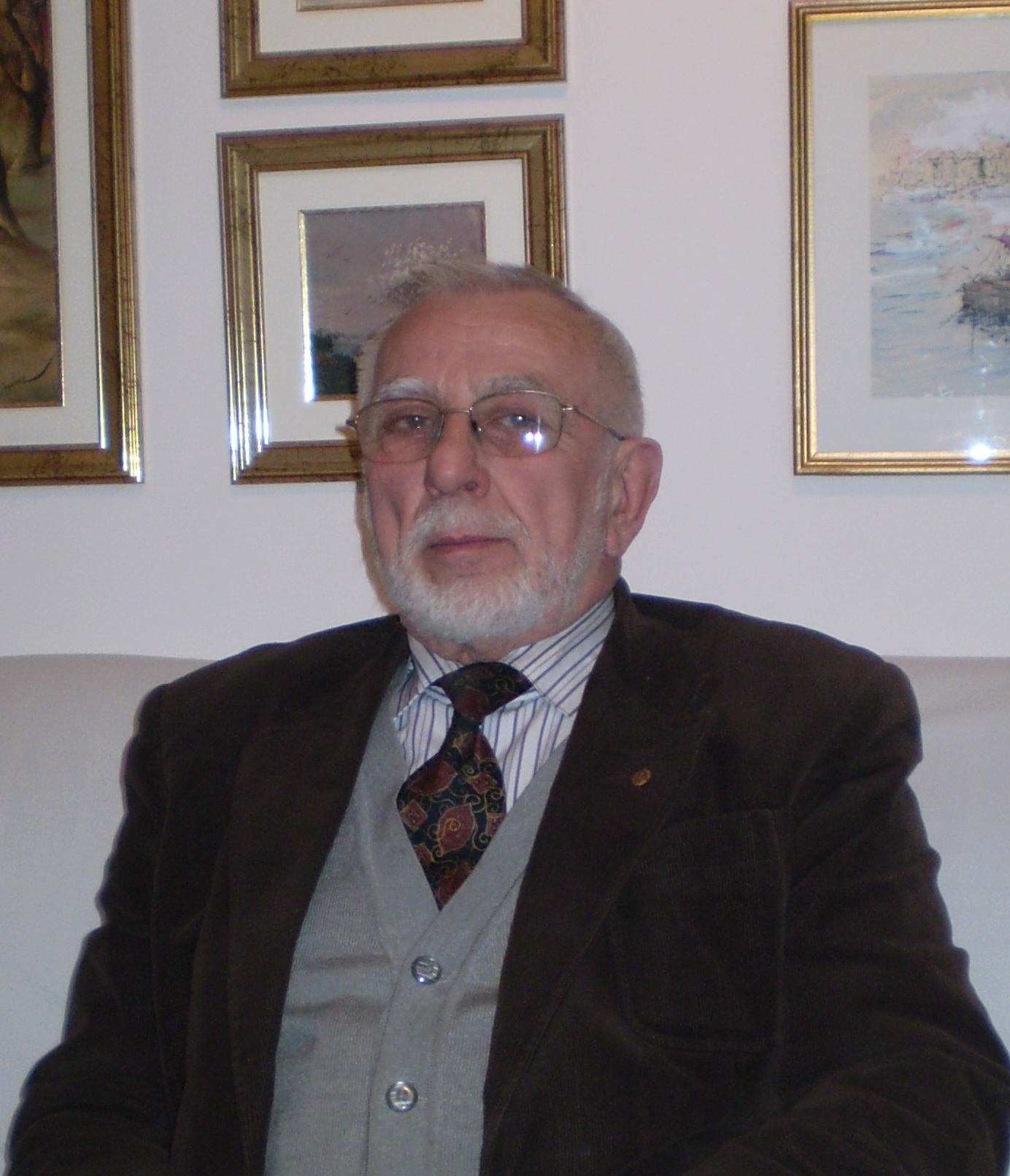
- Deretić in 2009
- Born: 18 January 1939; Orovac, Kingdom of Yugoslavia (now Bosnia and Herzegovina)
- Died: 6 June 2021 (aged 82); Belgrade, Serbia
- Known for: Controversial pseudohistory and alternate history
- Scientific career
- Fields: Ancient history of Serbia and Serbs (alternative history)

Jovan Ilić Deretić (Serbian Cyrillic: Јован Илић Деретић; 18 January 1939 – 6 June 2021) was a Serbian publicist and writer. Deretić was an engineer by training but was mainly noted for his pseudohistorical and conspiracy theories. He was the proponent of an alternative history of the Serbs that asserts a larger role in history than described by historians.

== Beliefs ==
According to Deretić, prior to the conquests of Alexander the Great, there lived an even more-accomplished conqueror named Serbon Makeridov, who was "father of all nations" and that "all of his descendants, or rather all known peoples, have Serbian origin". Ancient peoples such as ancient Greeks, Etruscans and Celts are therefore claimed to be Serbian. Deretić asserted that existing historical research is evidence for these theories but his interpretations have been universally rejected and heavily criticized by professional historians.

Deretić died on 6 June 2021, at the age of 82.

=== Political activity ===
Deretić organized a petition drive of Kosovo Serbs requesting Russian citizenship: "Ethnic Serbs in Kosovo would feel more protected, if Russia granted them citizenship." According to Deretić, Kosovo Serbs felt abandoned by the Serbian government after the Kumanovo Agreement ended the Kosovo War and they were attacked by the Kosovo Force: "NATO peacekeepers attacked unarmed Serbs in Kosovska Mitrovica, and ethnic cleansing is taking place in Kosovo where many Serbs were killed, disappeared or exiled." Deretić said he gathered 72,500 signatures from Kosovo Serbs who wanted to adopt Russia as "a second Serbia" that would protect them against anti-Serb violence.

== Works ==
- History of Serbs, I, Nice
- History of Serbs, II, Nice
- Western Serbia, Chicago
- Serb people and race, New Vulgate, Chicago, ISBN 86-86129-03-X
- Albanians in Serbia
- Ancient Serbia
- Serbs and Albanians, ISBN 978-86-902775-2-0
- Our Victory
- Invented immigration of Serbs, ISBN 978-86-86129-04-8
- Serbica
- Literacy before Cyril
- History of the Serbs and Russians, I
- History of the Serbs and Russians, II
- History of the Serbs and Russians, III
- Paul's Cave
