= List of Macedonian writers =

This is a list of Macedonian writers: Macedonian historians, philosophers, scientists, laboratory specialists, authors, and writers who were born in present-day North Macedonia or published in standard/dialectal Macedonian.

== A ==
- Gjorgji Abadžiev (1910–1963), prose writer
- Stojan Andov (1935–2024), author
- Petre M. Andreevski (1934–2006), writer
- Maja Apostoloska (born 1976)
- Venko Andonovski (born 1964), writer

== B ==
- Rumena Bužarovska (born 1981)

== C / Č ==
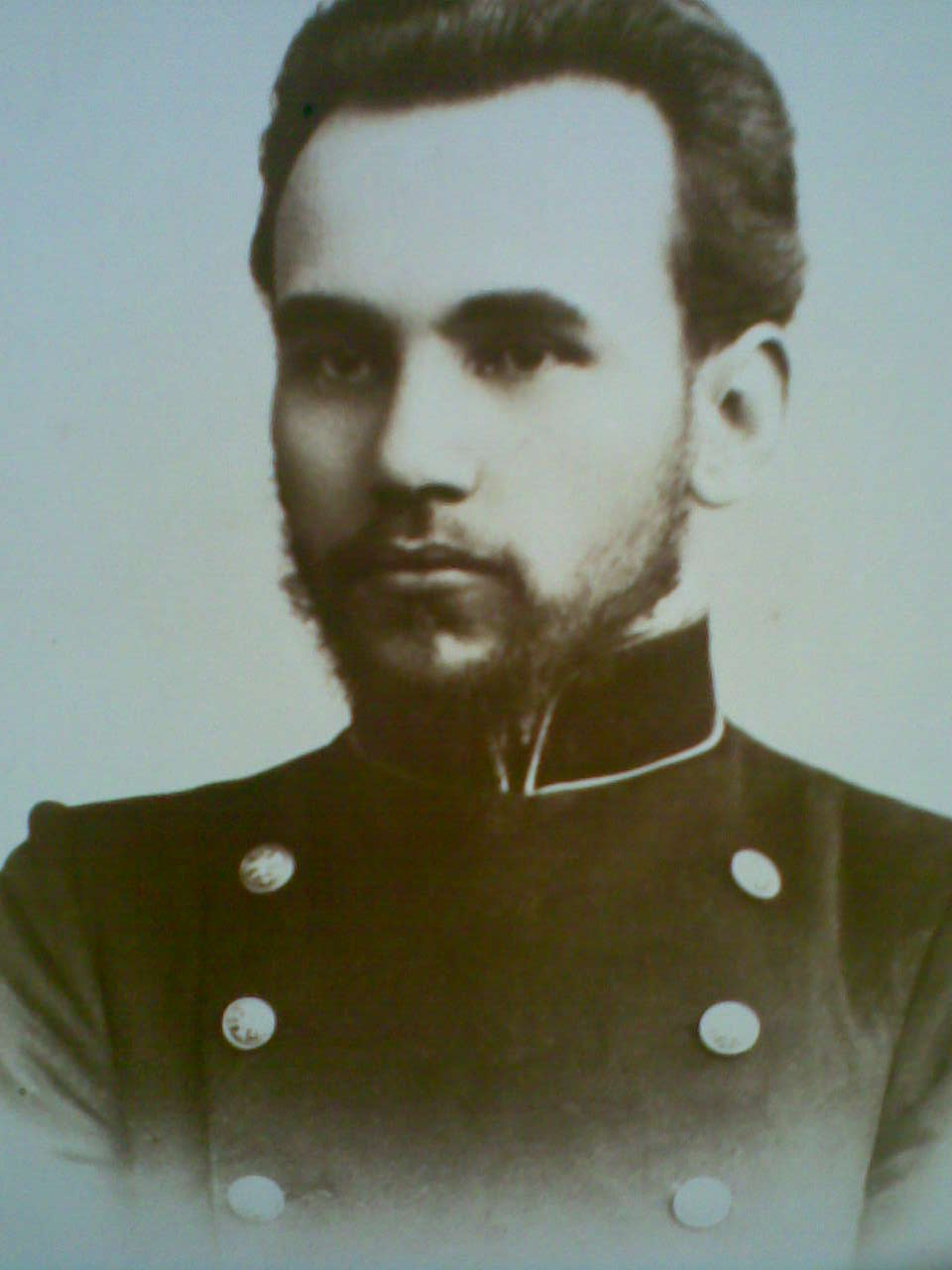
Dimitrija Čupovski

- Dimitrija Čupovski (1878–1940)
- Kole Čašule (1921–2009), prose writer
- Živko Čingo (1935–1987), writer
- Ivan Čapovski (1936-)

== D ==
- Igor Džambazov (born 1963)
- Dimitar Dimitrov (born 1937)
- Lidija Dimkovska (born 1971)
- Petre Dimovski

== G / Gj ==
- Bogomil Gjuzel (1939–2021), poet, writer and playwright
- Ljubčo Georgievski (born 1966), poet and writer
- Kiro Gligorov (1917–2012), author

== H ==
- Stojan Hristov (1898–1996)

== I ==
- Vasil Iljoski (1902–1995), playwright

== J ==
- Meto Jovanovski (born 1928)
- Slavko Janevski (1920–2000), prose writer
- Mišo Juzmeski (born 1966)

== K / Kj ==
- Aco Karamanov (1927–1944)
- Risto Kirjazovski (1927–2002)
- Blaže Koneski (1921–1993), linguist and writer
- Savo Kostadinovski (born 1950)
- Risto Krle (1900–1975), playwright
- Katica Kulavkova (born 1951), writer

== M ==
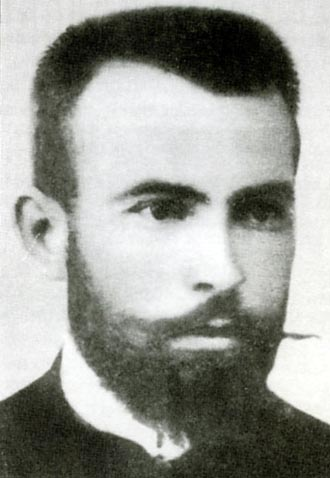
Krste Misirkov

- Vlado Maleski (1919–1984), prose writer
- Stefan Markovski (born 1990)
- Krste Misirkov (1874–1926), writer and author of On Macedonian Matters
- Venko Markovski (1915–1988), poet
- Mateja Matevski (1929–2018), poet

== N ==
- Kole Nedelkovski (1921–1941), poet

== P ==
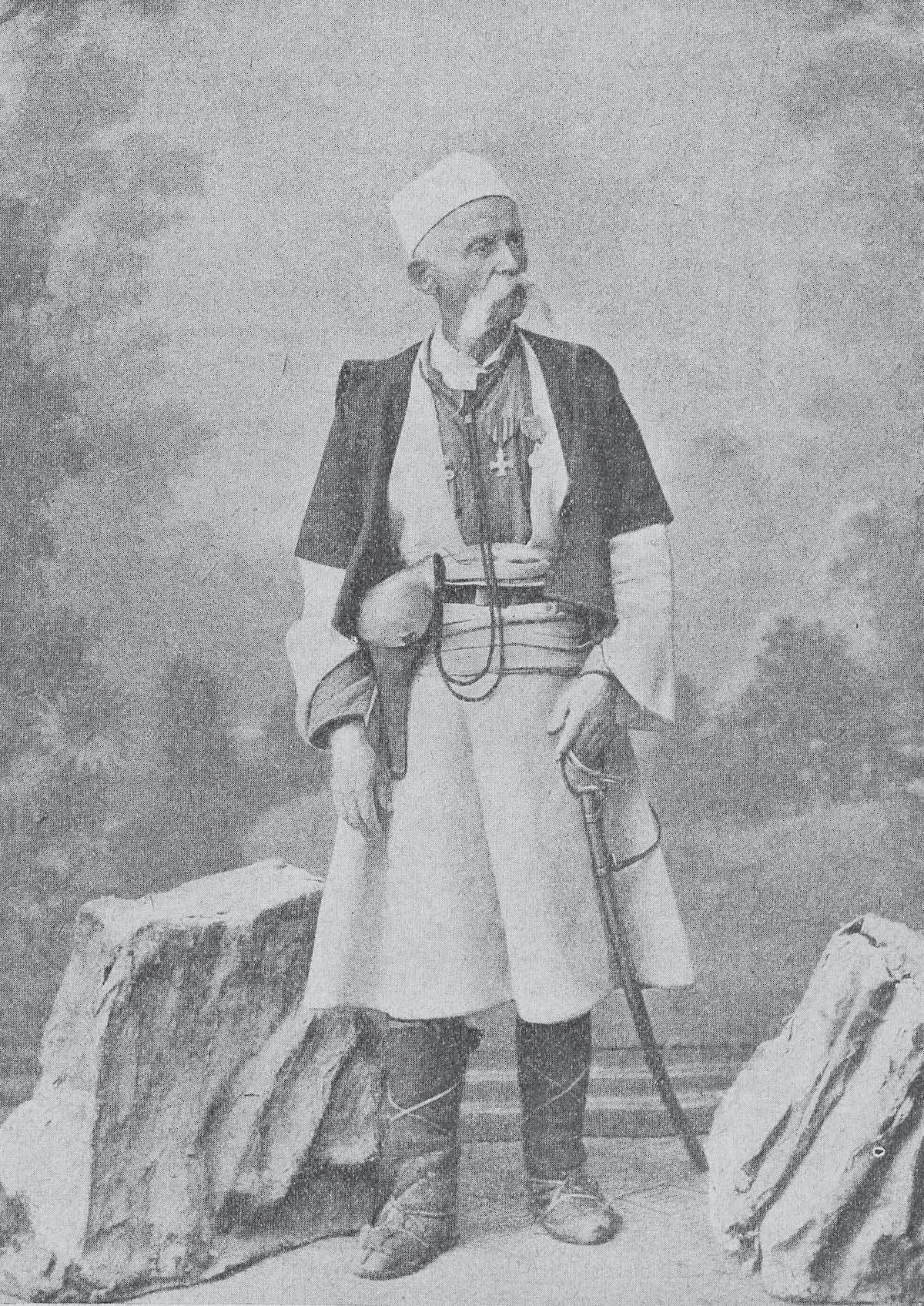
Gjorgjija Pulevski

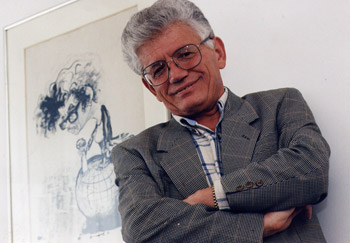
Božin Pavlovski

- Georgi Pulevski (1817–1895)
- Mihail Petrusevski (1911–1990)
- Anton Panov (1906–1967), playwright
- Božin Pavlovski (born 1942), prose writer
- Pande Petrovski (1943–2006) General

== R ==
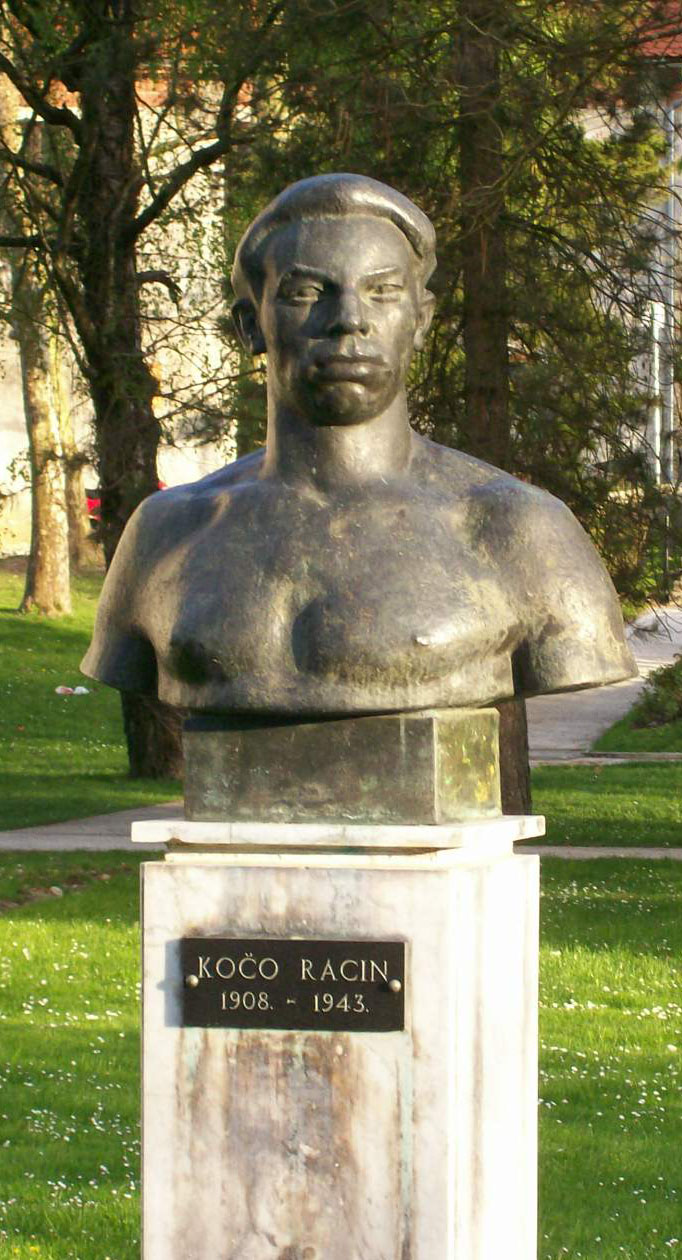
Kočo Racin

- Blaže Ristovski (1931–2018), academic
- Kočo Racin (1908–1943), poet, writer and author of poetry collection White Dawns

== S/Š ==
- Aco Šopov (1923–1982), poet and translator
- Goce Smilevski (born 1975), prose writer
- Goran Stefanovski (1952–2018), playwright
- Luan Starova (born 1941)

== T ==
- Gane Todorovski (1929–2010), poet
- Zoran T. Popovski (born 1962)
- Jovica Tasevski-Eternijan (born 1976)
