= Ivan Čapovski =

Macedonian writer (born 1936)

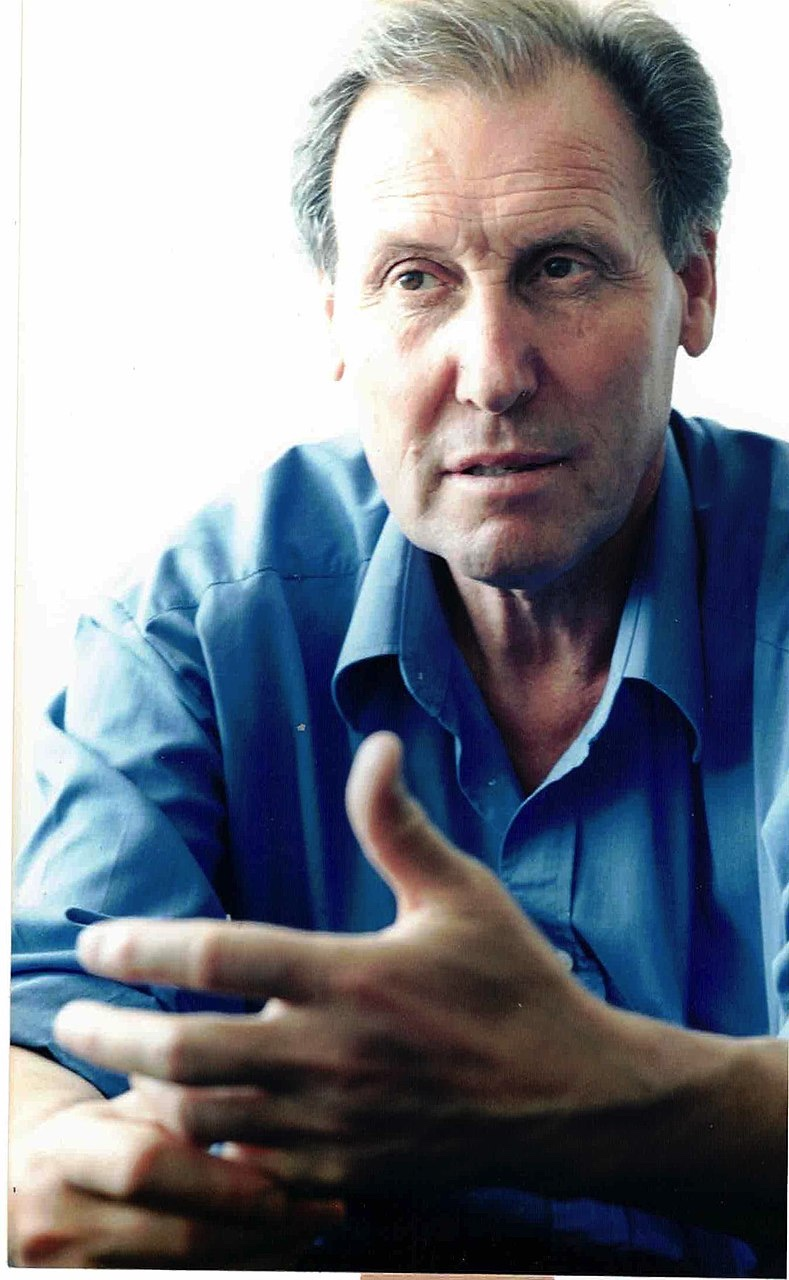
- Portrait of a Macedonian writer Ivan Čapovski
- Born: October 12, 1936 (age 89); Pozarsko, Aegean Macedonia, Greece
- Occupation: Writer

Ivan Čapovski (born October 12, 1936) is a Macedonian writer, poet and novelist.

== Life and career ==
Čapovski was born in the village Pozarsko, Aegean Macedonia, Greece on October 12, 1936. Amidst the Greek Civil War in 1947, he fled with his family to Vojvodina (Serbia) and later on to the Socialist Republic of Macedonia. Čapovski graduated in Macedonian and history of literature from the Philosophy Department at the Ss. Cyril and Methodius University of Skopje. He worked as a journalist in the newspapers Vecer and Nova Makedonija. Since 1963 he worked as a documentary director at the Macedonian Television and Radio Broadcast for more than 20 years. He has been editor-in-chief of the Makedonska Kniga publishing house. He has been a member of the Macedonian Writers Association since 1963 and the Macedonian PEN Centre. His poetry has been widely published and translated throughout Europe and Asia. Today he lives and writes in Skopje.

== Published works ==
- Ashes under the Olive Trees (poetry, Kultura, 1963)
- Rain, After the Rain, Vera (poetry, Kočo Racin, 1964)
- Evangelists (poetry, 1969)
- Beautiful Razdelina (poetry, Makedonska Kniga-Skopje, 1973)
- Ship (poetry, Misla, 1980)
- Border (novel, Makedonska Kniga, 1982)
- Prisons (poetry, Misla, 1983)
- Fog ( novel, Misla, 1985)
- Snake (novel, Misla, 1989).
- The Wooden Bridges of the Vardar, Čapovski, Ivan, and Kosta Bojadžievski. Drvenite Mostovi Na Vardar. Skopje: Makedonska kniga, 1990. Print.
- Krstan and Sirak (novel, Detska Radost-Skopje, 1991)
- The Women of Summer (poetry, Misla,1992)
- Macedonian Orthodox Church ‘St Georges’ (York Press, Melbourne 1992)
- Blood of the Eucalyptus Tree (novel, Makedonska kniga-Skopje, 1996)
- Writer’s Saga (novel, MATICA MAKEDONSKA, Skopje and Melbourne, 1999)
- Tamarisk's Poison (novel, Kultura, 2002)
- The Sorrow of Miles Franklin Beneath the Kajmakčalan (novel, Kultura, 2004)
- The Poet and the Beautiful Razdelina (2006)
- Crni Sokoli- Beli Megleni (Mikena, 2008)
- The Executor (novel, Makavej, 2008) Čapovski, Ivan. Dželatot: Roman. Skopje: Makavej, 2008. Print.
- The Vision of Lokvata and Vinari (stories, MATICA MAKEDONSKA 2010)
- Lazar's Star Above New York (political chronicle, Silson, 2012)
- Pesna za stariot komita (poetry, Matica Makedonska, 2016)
- Ubavinata i tainstvenosta na knigite (Matica Makedonska, 2021. Print.)

== Bibliography ==
=== Ivan Čapovski's Poetry Collection in English ===
- BLACK HAWKS, WHITE MEGLENS, ( National and University Library-Kliment of Ohrid, Skopje, 2011. ISBN 978-608-232-049-6)

=== Ivan Čapovski's Novel in English ===
- The sorrow of Miles Franklin beneath the Mount Kajmakčalan (Cadmus Press, 2020)

==== Reviews of Čapovski's work ====
Zoran Čukič: Patnja kao sudbina (Ivan Čapovski: Zatvori-Izdavač:Književna zajednica Novog Sada, 1987.) 4 Jul. Beograd, 08.XII.1987.
Dr. Miodrag Drugovac: Obnova na ogledaloto ( Ivan Čapovski: Ženite na letoto), Nova Makedonija. 10 november, 1993.

=== Articles by Ivan Čapovski ===
- Čapovski, Ivan. "Pisatelot Pred Dvanaeset Prašalnici." Razvitok. (1988): 7-8. Print.
- "Da Ečat Planinite Mariovski: Šesta Mariovsko-Meglenska Kulturna Manifestacija." Makedonija. (1989): 24-25. Print.
- Čapovski, Ivan. tr. "Solunson (ili Solunsmrt)." Nova Makedonija. 47 (1991). Print.
- Dve pesni Современост : списание за литература, уметност и општествени прашања. ISSN 0038-5972. - year. 41, number. 1-4 (January–April 1992), pages. 117-118
- Čapovski, Ivan, Kosta Racin and Mekavata (1993). Kosta Racin and Mekavata
- Prokletstvo na granicata, Ivan Čapovski ISSN 1409-8180. - Year. 3, number. 12 (July–August 1994), p. 46
- Ivan's snow, 1997. Sum, Art magazine. https://plus.mk.cobiss.net/opac7/bib/61445130
- Biser, Čapovski Ivan (1998). Ulaznica : časopis za kulturu, umetnost i društvena pitanja. ISSN 0503-1362. - 32, Number. 156 (1998), p. 67
- Tazni tancari. Толкувања. - p. 111
- Blagovest, Evangelisti Стремеж : списание за литературни, културни и општествени прашања. ISSN 0039-2294. - year. 46, number. 11-12 (2000), pages. 75-77
- Епитафи кон песните "Песни - надвор од времето" враќање, враќање од убавината од која исчезнавме, Ivan Čapovski Современост. ISSN 0038-5972. - year. 52, number. 4 (2004), pages. 24-42
- Црни досиеја во името на мртви идеологии : кон текстот "Идеологија и литература", Синтези. ISSN 1409-6102. - Бр. 3 (2006), стр. 66-68
- Евангелист Матеја = The Evangelist Matthew, Čapovski, Ivan. Синтези : македонски книжевен гласник. ISSN 1409-6102. - number. 8 (2007), p. 2
- Ѕвездените коски (Macedonian), Čapovski Ivan. Синтези. ISSN 1409-6102. - number. 19 (2010), pages. 54-57

=== Ivan Čapovski's poems in various anthologies ===
- tr. Antologija na makedonskata revolucionerna poezija (Dimitar Mitrev, Skopje: Nasa kniga, 1974)
- Anthology of the contemporary Macedonian poetry in Hungarian language: ASZÓ SZÜLETÉSE, MAI MAKEDÓN KÖLTÖK, EURÓPA KÖNYVKIADÖ (translated and edited by Zoltan Cuka.)
- Anthology of the contemporary Macedonian poetry in German language: MODERNE MAKEDONISCHE LYRIK, STUTTGART, 1978
- Antologija jugoslovenske antiratne poezije 1945-1985; Doko Stojičić: Ljudi bez oružja (Nova Knjiga, Beograd 1985)
- Anthology of the contemporary Macedonian poetry in Russian language: Писня Жеми (Ruske slovo, Novi Sad, 1986, edited by dr Slobodan Mickoviќ.)
- Македонска љубовна поезија, Struga, Struga Poetry Evenings (SPE), 1973 (Slobodan Mickoviќ.)
- Четири песнички круга: избор из нове македонске поезије. edited by Georgi Stardelov; translated from Macedonian Slobodan Mickoviќ.-Skopje: National and University Library "St, Kliment of Ohrid", 1974.)
- Jugoslovenska poezija za NOV i Revolucijata (Tamara Arsovska - Atanas Bojarovski, Наша Книга, Skopje, 1988)
- Arbuljevska, Olga, and Ivan Čapovski. tr. Vetrot Na Promenite., 1992. Print.
- tr. STRUŠKI VEČERI NA POEZIJATA, et al. (1980). Pesnata megu dve leta - [80]. Struga, Struški večeri na poezijata.
- Stojčevski, Sande, Mihail Rendžov, Ivan Čapovski, Jovan Pavlovski, Bogomil Ǵuzel, Trajan Petrovski, Danica Ručigaj, et al. 1990. NAPRAVI čudo za mene. Skopje: Kultura.
- Kitevski, Marko, Rade Siljan, and Ivan Čapovski. tr. Folklorni Biseri. Skopje: Makedonska kniga, 1988. Print.
- SPASOV, A., et al. (1989). OD drvoto na životot: antologija na makedonskata poezija. Skopje, Misla. Retrieved 26 September 2020.
- The island of Iaros, Chapovski Ivan (2013): The Macedonian P.E.N.. ISSN 1409-813X (2013). - p. 41

== Awards ==
In 2010 Čapovski was awarded the Macedonian National Award for Science, Arts and Education, ‘23 October Award’, for his life work. His book of poetry Beautiful Razdelina was awarded the distinguished ‘13 November Award’, his novels Fog and The Blood of the Eucalyptus tree received the 'Kosta Racin Award' and the 'Stale Popov Award'. His novel Snake received the “Misla Publishing House Award” for the best novel of the year. In 2014 he was awarded 'Literary Scepter' Книжевно жезло (from the Writers' Association of Macedonia).
