= VerseVille =

Indian literary e-magazine

- Editor-in-chief: Sonnet Mondal
- Categories: Poetry literary magazine
- Frequency: Quarterly
- Founded: 2008; 18 years ago
- Country: India
- Based in: Kolkata, West Bengal
- Website: www.verseville.org
- ISSN: 0974-3057

VerseVille (formerly The Enchanting Verses) is a poetry e-magazine based in West Bengal, India. Since 2008 the magazine has published three to four issues per year featuring works of both new and established poets. The magazine also publishes translations, book reviews, essays on poetry and research articles. In March 2015, The Independent Newspaper mentioned the Enchanting Verses as a leading Indian electronic literary review whose prime focus is the world’s contemporary poetry and the ANI News mentioned it as a prominent international e-magazine from India later in the same month. Some notable contributors include Sidney Wade, Liao Yiwu, Donald Revell, Tom Bradley (author), Rae Desmond Jones, Martha Collins, Miguel Barnet, Diann Blakely, Charles Harper Webb, Malay Roy Choudhury, Gopi Kottoor, K. Satchidanandan, Candice James, Melissa Studdard, B. R. Dionysius, Taslima Nasrin, Hemant Divate, Abhay Kumar, Kishwar Naheed, and Nathalie Handal.

== Collaboration with Stremez ==
The Enchanting Verses collaborated with the Macedonian literary magazine Stremez in March 2011 to contribute to cultural exchange through poetry between Macedonia and the rest of the world. This collaboration has received special mentions in the Diplomatic Bulletin of the Ministry of Foreign Affairs of the Republic of Macedonia along with other international media.

== The Enchanting Poet ==
The journal bestows in each issue the title of The Enchanting Poet to a poet in recognition of contributions to the world of poetry. Some recipients include Sidney WadeJayanta Mahapatra, Mateja Matevski, Jovica Tasevski-Eternijan, and Stephen Gill. Mateja Matevski was featured as The Enchanting Poet in 2011 who won the Golden Wreath Award later in that year.
