= List of events held in Boris Trajkovski Sports Center =

Date	Event	Attendance	Type	Note
September 6, 2008	Macedonia - Portugal	6,000	Sport/basketball	A qualification match for EuroBasket 2009
September 13, 2008	Macedonia - Latvia	6,000	Sport/basketball	A qualification match for EuroBasket 2009
September 26, 2008	Macedonia - Estonia	6,500	Sport/basketball	A qualification match for EuroBasket 2009
December 2, 2008	Croatia - Serbia	2,000	Sport/handball	First match in the preliminary round on the 2008 European Women's Handball Championship
December 2, 2008	Germany - Macedonia	5,500	Sport/handball	2008 European Women's Handball Championship
December 3, 2008	Hungary - Romania	1,000	Sport/handball	2008 European Women's Handball Championship
December 3, 2008	France - Denmark	800	Sport/handball	2008 European Women's Handball Championship
December 4, 2008	Serbia - Germany	3,500	Sport/handball	2008 European Women's Handball Championship
December 4, 2008	Macedonia - Croatia	6.600	Sport/handball	2008 European Women's Handball Championship
December 5, 2008	Romania - France	700	Sport/handball	2008 European Women's Handball Championship
December 5, 2008	Denmark - Hungary	1,000	Sport/handball	2009 World Men's Handball Championship
December 6, 2008	Germany - Croatia	1,000	Sport/handball	2008 European Women's Handball Championship
December 6, 2008	Macedonia - Serbia	6,000	Sport/handball	2008 European Women's Handball Championship
December 7, 2008	France - Hungary	600	Sport/handball	2008 European Women's Handball Championship
December 7, 2008	Denmark - Romania	1,000	Sport/handball	2008 European Women's Handball Championship
December 8, 2008	Belarus - Croatia	600	Sport/handball	2008 European Women's Handball Championship
December 8, 2008	Russia - Macedonia	6800	Sport/Handball	2008 European Women's Handball Championship
December 10, 2008	Russia - Croatia	500	Sport/handball	2008 European Women's Handball Championship
December 10, 2008	Sweden - Macedonia	6,000	Sport/handball	2008 European Women's Handball Championship
December 10, 2008	Belarus - Germany	200	Sport/handball	2008 European Women's Handball Championship
December 11, 2008	Sweden - Croatia	300	Sport/handball	2008 European Women's Handball Championship
December 11, 2008	Russia - Germany	1,000	Sport/handball	2008 European Women's Handball Championship
December 11, 2008	Belarus - Macedonia	6,000	Sport/handball	2008 European Women's Handball Championship
December 13, 2008	Romania - Croatia	500	Sport/handball	2008 European Women's Handball Championship
December 13, 2008	Spain - Germany	1,000	Sport/handball	2008 European Women's Handball Championship
December 13, 2008	Norway - Russia	1,800	Sport/handball	2008 European Women's Handball Championship
December 14, 2008	Russia - Germany	2,300	Sport/handball	2008 European Women's Handball Championship
December 14, 2008	Norway - Spain	5,000	Sport/handball	Final match of 2008 European Women's Handball Championship
October 22, 2009	ZZ Top		Concert	
November 12, 2009	Underworld	2,500	Concert	
25 January 2010	Prijatelite za Toše	10,000	Humanitarian concert	A humanitarian concert dedicated to the late Macedonian superstar Toše Proeski
March 31, 2010	50 Cent	10,000	Concert	Together with G-Unit & Toni Zen. Part of The Invitation Tour.
April 1, 2010	Haris Džinović	3,000-4,000	Concert	
June 1, 2010	Željko Joksimović	12,000	Concert	A concert of Joksimović's 2010 Balkan tour
June 5, 2010	Vlatko Ilievski	around 10,000	Concert	
August 5, 2010	Macedonia - Hungary	5,500	Sport/basketball	A qualification match for EuroBasket 2011
August 14, 2010	Macedonia - Bosnia and Herzegovina	7,000	Sport/basketball	A qualification match for EuroBasket 2011
August 17, 2010	Macedonia - Ukraine	7,000	Sport/basketball	A qualification match for EuroBasket 2011
August 23, 2010	Macedonia - Great Britain	10,000	Sport/basketball	A qualification match for EuroBasket 2011
October 22, 2010	Željko Samardžić		Concert	
November 6, 2010	Severina		Concert	And Goran Bregović as a special guest star
November 20, 2010	Jelena Karleuša		Concert	Part of All about Diva tour
November 26, 2010	Ceca	12,000	Concert	
November 27, 2010	Ceca	10,000	Concert	
December 25, 2010	Zdravko Čolić		Concert	
February 12, 2011	Đorđe Balašević		Concert	
December 24, 2011	Željko Joksimović		Concert	
April 16, 2011	Lepa Brena	12,000	Concert	Začarani krug Tour
October 5–08, 2011	European Bowling Championship		Sports Event	
October 26–29, 2011	World cup kick-box		Sports Event	
October 2, 2012	Lenny Kravitz	canceled	Concert	Lenny Kravitz Live - Black and White America tour
April 13, 2013	Severina Vučković		Concert	
July 2–7, 2013	European Championships in wrestling for juniors		Sports Event	
November 1, 2013	Igor Dzambazov	12.000	Concert	
November 16, 2013	Zlatan Stipišić Gibonni		Concert	
November 29, 2013	Oliver Dragojević	9.000	Concert	
May 31, 2014	Zdravko Čolić	10.000	Concert	
November 7, 2014	Bjelo Dugme		Concert	
November 28, 2014	Toni Cetinski		Concert	
November 29, 2014	Miroslav Ilic and Adil Maksutovic		Concert	
December 13, 2014	Karolina Goceva	8.000	Concert	Final promotion of the album Makedonsko Devojce
February 14, 2015	Vlado Georgiev		Concert	
March 14, 2015	Ana Bekuta Saban Saulic Sasa Matic	9.000	Concert	
March 28, 2015	Dino Merlin	10.000	Concert	
April 3, 2015	Vlado Janevski		Concert	
April 18, 2015	Hari Varešanović, Haris Džinović, Vesna Zmijanac		Concert	
June 1, 2015	OneRepublic	9.000	Concert	
June 6, 2015	Parni Valjak	6.000	Concert	
November 25, 2015	Whitesnake	10.000	Concert	
November 27, 2015	Tamara Todevska		Concert	
February 13, 2016	Željko Samardžić		Concert	
April 16, 2016	„Life without limits“ with Nick Vujicic	6.000	Charity event	
June 20, 2016	Enrique Iglesias	N/A	Concert	Sex & Love Tour
November 13, 2016	Jean-Michel Jarre	6.000	Concert	
March 4, 2017	Oliver Dragojević & Zlatan Stipišić Gibonni	N/A	Concert	
March 18, 2017	Elemental	N/A	Concert	
March 25, 2017	Ceca	10.000	Concert	
April 8, 2017	Bijelo Dugme	10.000	Concert	
April 18–24, 2024	36th Annual Skopje Book Fair		Book fair	
February 28, 2026	K-Pop Forever!		Tribute act concert	
