= The Lion of Yanina =

Book by Stoyan Christowe

The Lion Of Yanina
- Title page for The Lion of Yanina A Narrative Based on the Life of Ali Pasha, Despot of Epirus (1941)
- Author: Stoyan Christowe
- Language: English
- Genre: Narrative Novel
- Publisher: Modern Age Books
- Publication date: 1941
- Media type: Print book

The Lion Of Yanina is a novel written by Stoyan Christowe. The full name of the novel is: The Lion of Yanina A Narrative Based on the Life of Ali Pasha, Despot of Epirus.

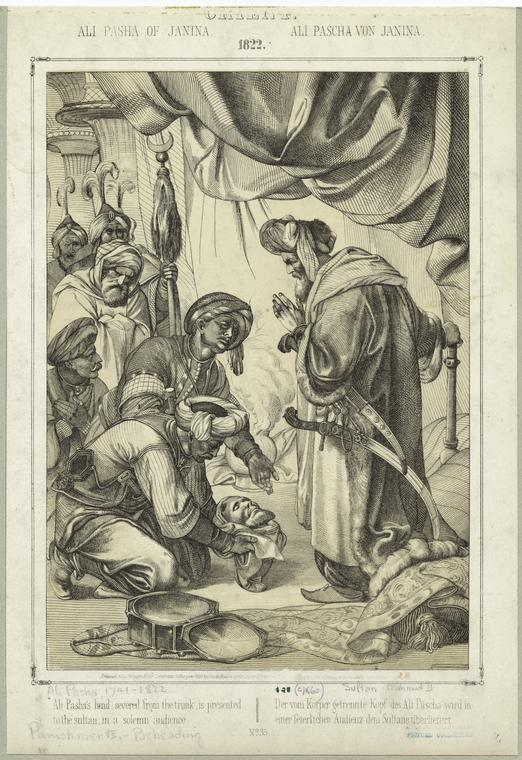
Ali Pasha's head is presented to Sultan Mahmut II. - lithography by Johann Nepomuk Geiger
