= Stoyan Christowe =

American author (1898–1995)

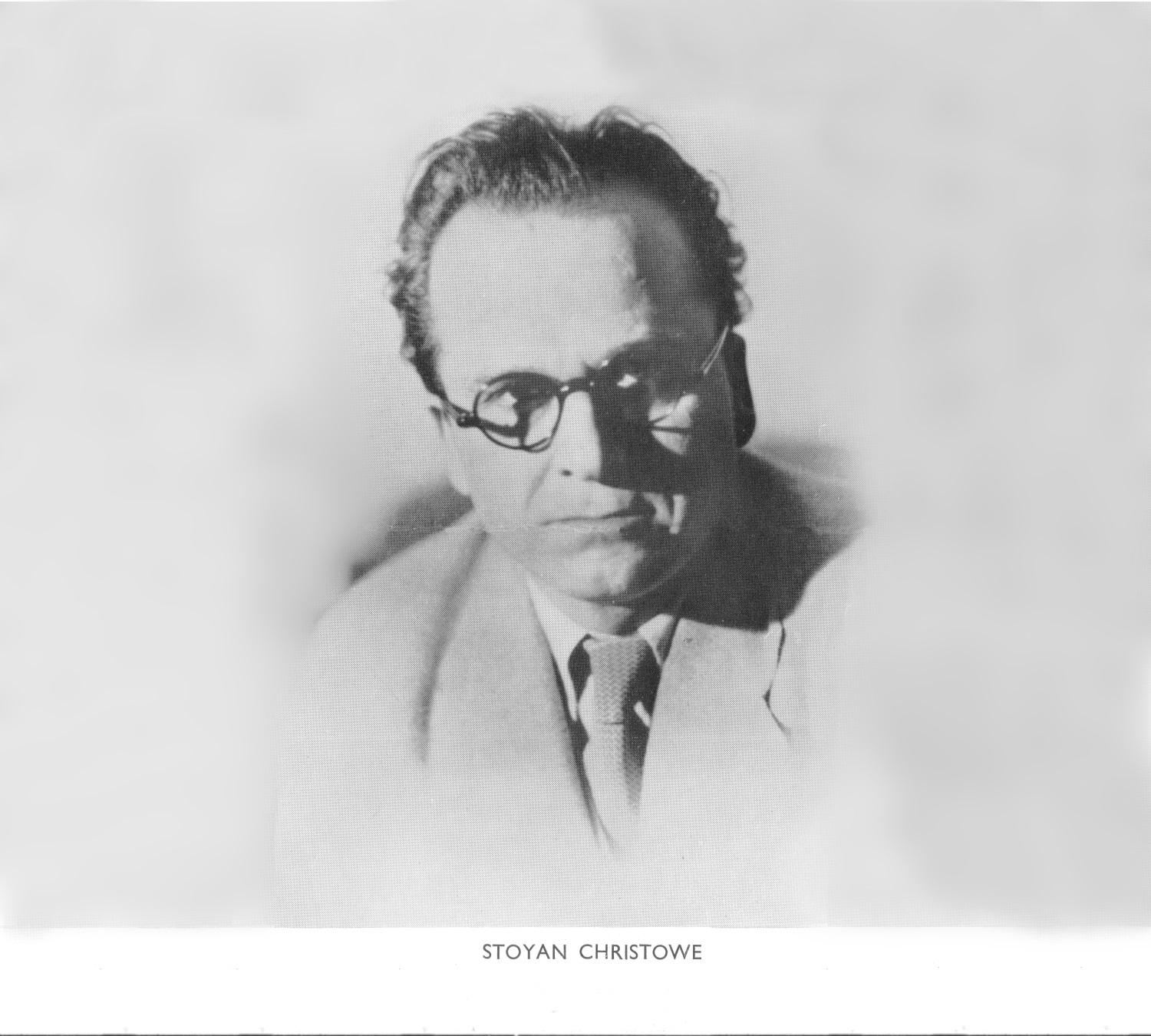
- Born: Stoyan Naumoff [Стоян Hayмoв] September 1, 1898; Konomladi, Ottoman Empire
- Died: December 28, 1995 (aged 97); Brattleboro, Vermont, US
- Education: Valparaiso University
- Occupations: Writer, publicist, journalist, senator
- Spouse: Margaret Wooters
- Writing career
- Genres: Ethnology, cultural history, politics
- Notable works: My American Pilgrimage (1938); This is my Country (1947); The Eagle and the Stork (1976)
- Website: myamericanpilgrimagemovie.com

Stoyan Christowe, also known as Stojan Hristoff (September 1, 1898 – December 28, 1995), was an American author, journalist and political figure in the state of Vermont. Born in what is now Makrochori, Greece, then a part of the Ottoman Empire, he is best remembered as a prolific author and Vermont legislator. He authored six books on the Balkan states. Christowe was awarded an honorary doctorate from the Ss. Cyril and Methodius University of Skopje in the Socialist Republic of Macedonia and was elected an honorary member of the Macedonian Academy of Arts and Sciences (MANU).

== Early life ==
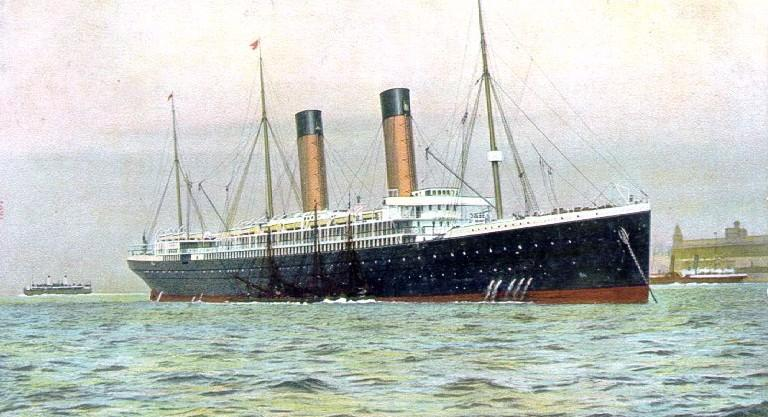
In 1911, only 13 years old, Stoyan boarded the RMS Oceanic for America.

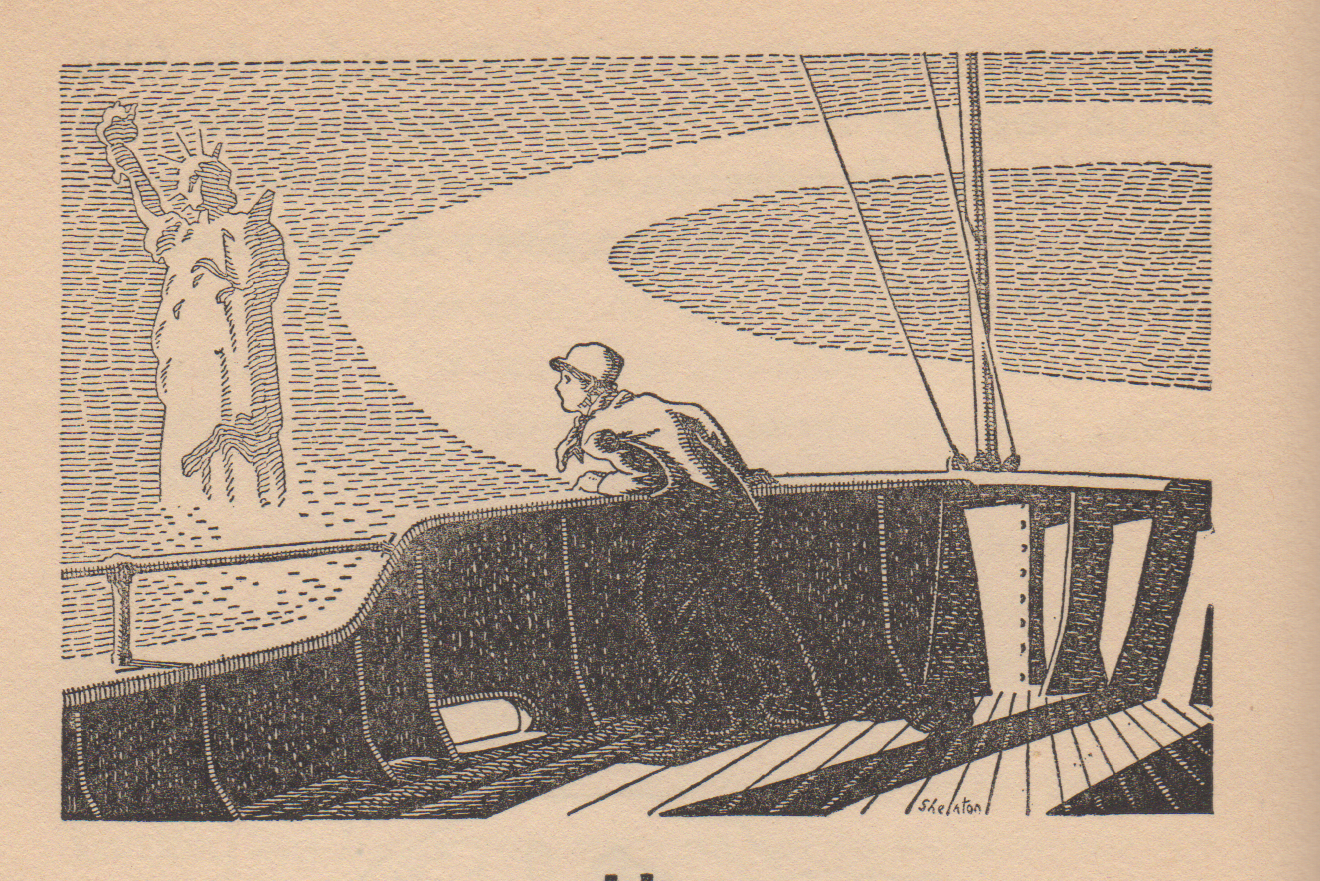
Stoyan's first glimpse of the Statue of Liberty, as illustrated in This is My Country by Edward Shelton

Stoyan Christowe (né Naumof) was born in Konomladi, Ottoman Macedonia, September 1, 1898, to Mitra and Christo Naumof. He was the eldest of three children, preceding his brother, Vasil, and Mara, his sister. Born into the disintegrating Ottoman Empire, Christowe dreamed of becoming a komitadji, a freedom fighter. He longed to help overthrow the oppressive, 500-year long Ottoman rule, in order to bring freedom to Macedonia.

After the failure of the Ilinden-Preobrazhenie Uprising, many Konomladi residents sought a better life in the United States of America. These immigrants would often periodically come back to the village wearing luxury items, such as gold teeth and expensive wrist-watches. Their stories of the wealth and opportunities in the United States inspired the young Christowe to see the country for himself. Homes were still mostly illuminated using candles at this time in Ottoman Macedonia, and mule-pulled carriages were the primary mode of long-distance transportation.

== Life in the United States ==
At only 13-years-old, Stoyan Naumoff (he would later change his name to "Hristov", and in 1924 anglicized it to "Christowe") boarded the Oceanic in Naples, Italy, destined for the United States. Ellis Island records indicate that he passed himself off as a 16-year-old Italian named Giovanni Chorbadji, believing that he would be admitted to the US easier if he were not a "Balkan peasant".

Following his immigration screening at Ellis Island, he immediately headed to St. Louis, Missouri. Once there, he bunked in squalid conditions with other Macedonian men, taking on a succession of menial jobs, including in a shoe factory, as a soda jerk and later in St. Louis Union Station. The pay for these positions was low, and the days were long. The nature of this kind of work was both dangerous and tedious for a teenage Christowe. He gradually learned English, making great efforts to assimilate to American culture. The majority of Balkan immigrants to the United States made little effort to conform to the American way of life, living as closely as possible to how they did in their respective homelands. The sole objective for these individuals was to live as cheaply as possible for a few years, work endlessly in order to save money, then to return to Macedonia to "live like a pasha".

Their beings were not inoculated with the leaven of America that worked so powerfully with earlier immigrants from other lands. They were familiar with the heat of the steel mills and iron foundries and roundhouses but never came in contact with the heat of the melting pot. America had not put her finger on their minds or hearts as it had done to millions before them and as it would to their children and grandchildren.

After three years in St. Louis, Christowe embarqued on a journey that would take him across the country. First he traveled westward, finding work on the Union Pacific Railway in Montana and Wyoming. He enrolled at Valparaiso University in an effort to earn his high school diploma. His writing career began as a contributor to The Torch, the college's newspaper.

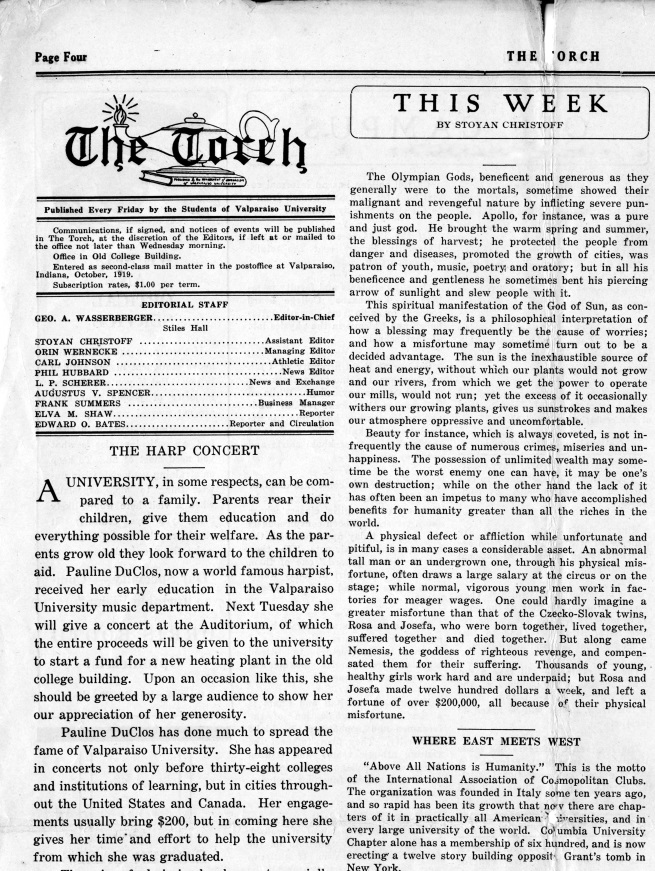
Front page of The Torch

In 1922, he moved to a Chicago suburb in search of a career, and eventually started freelancing as a book reviewer for the Chicago Daily News. He was dispatched to the Balkans as a correspondont from 1927 to1929. Christowe was stationed in Bulgaria during this period, ultimately becoming a comrade of Aleksandar Balabanov and Elin Pelin. In 1928, Christowe, then using the surname "Hristov", visited Greece, but intentionally avoided the village of his birth for the fear of being conscripted as a soldier in the Greek army. As a correspondent in Sofia he interviewed Ivan Mihailov, Tsar Boris III, Vlado Chernozemski and others. He eventually became a well-recognized expert on that region. His book, Heroes and Assassins, became required reading for those seeking to understand the post-World War Balkans, as well as the factional politics of Macedonia, the principal player in it being the Internal Macedonian Revolutionary Organization.

I belong spiritually as well as chronologically to the generations of immigrants who had to Americanize as well as acculturate, integrate, assimilate, coalesce, all at the same time. With me, the process had begun even before I had set foot on American soil. Robert Frost expressed it when he said at John F. Kennedy's inauguration that 'We were the land, before the land was ours.

Christowe visited Bulgaria once again in 1934, just after the military government crackdown on the IMRO. In the 1930s Stoyan moved to New York City and spent ten years penning articles and writing book reviews for major magazines of the day, like the Dial, the Story Magazine, Harper's Bazaar and a myriad of others, establishing himself as a respected author and critic. Stoyan's fourth book, "This is My Country", was in fact found on president Franklin D. Roosevelt bedside table when he died, a present from his wife Eleanor.

Upon reaching his thirties, Christowe began a quest to untangle his roots. He had struggled with the issue of his national identity since his teenage years. In 1929, in an article in The Outlook and Independent he addressed the issue candidly:

What has been there result of this long gestation in the womb of America? Despite the readiness and zeal with which I tossed myself in the melting pot I still am not wholly an American and never will be. It is not my fault. I have done all I could. America will not accept me. America wanted more, it wanted complete transformation inward and outward. That is impossible in one generation. Then what is my fate? What am I? Am I still what I was before I came to America, or am I a half American and half something else? To me, precisely, there lies our tragedy. I am neither one nor the other, I am an orphan. Spiritually, physically, linguistically I have not been wholly domesticated.

His passage from discombobulated newcomer, to hyphenated-American, to articulate chronicler of the migrant's experience, offers a primary source that changes over the thirty years of his writing.

== Personal life ==
The privilege to speak is a basic and important privilege…. Just think what would happen if the privilege to speak was taken away from me, you too would be affected for you could not listen to me.. let alone speak.…"

— "Craggy soil sprung a rebel", April 27, 1958, the New York Times

In 1939, Christowe married Margaret Wooters, a writer from Philadelphia. They had met seven years earlier while he was working on his first book, Heroes and Assassins, as a writer in residence at the Yaddo Writing Retreat. He and Margaret moved to Vermont in 1939. In 1941, shortly after the US entered World War II, Christowe was called to duty and worked as a military analyst covering the Balkans in the War Department for the next two years. In December 1943 he returned to Vermont and refocused on writing, his true calling. He spent the next ten years writing articles, editorial pieces and book reviews for major American newspapers and magazines. However, the matters of his identity, his roots, and his place in American society continued to haunt him. In the first half of his life, Christowe self-identified as Bulgarian. He reinterpreted his understanding of his background after World War II and the establishment of the Macedonian state within the Yugoslav Federation, establishing himself as an ethnic Macedonian.

He gave numerous lectures at college campuses in Austria, Germany and Yugoslavia speaking at college campuses and lecturing about American ideals. In 1952, Christowe visited Skopje, the capital of Yugoslav Macedonia. In 1953, he met Marshal Josip Broz Tito in Belgrade. Christowe criticized the Marshal for his treatment of political dissidents. In 1985 he revisited Yugoslavia, where he was awarded with the title Doctor Honoris Causa of the University of Sts. Cyril & Methodius in Skopje.

== Political career ==
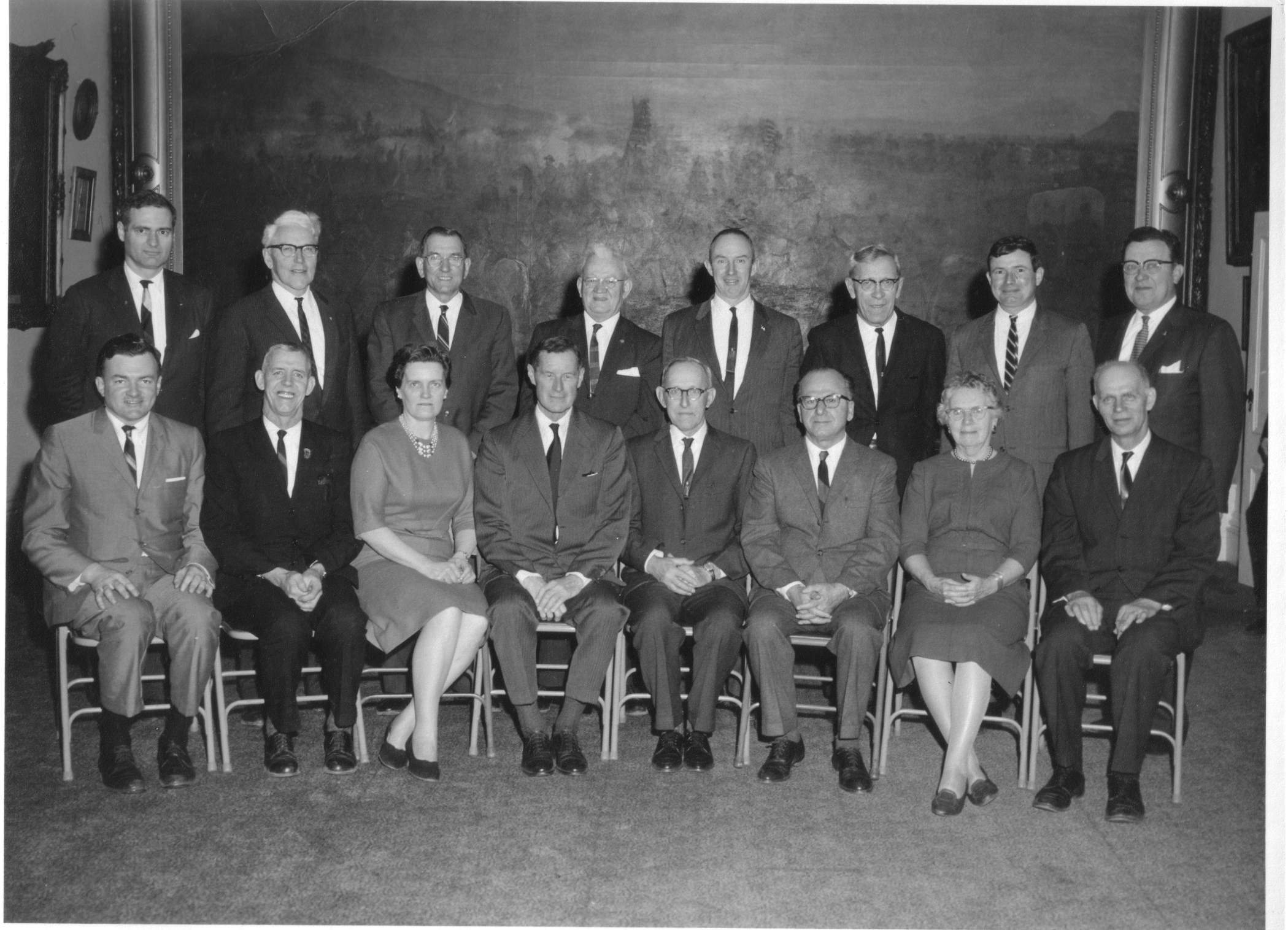
The 1964 Vermont Senate

After graduating from Valparaiso University, Christowe became a correspondent for the Chicago Daily News.

At the New Yorker from 1930 to 1939 he worked as a freelance writer, and from 1941 to 1943 he worked as a military analyst at the War Department.

In Vermont, from January 1944 to 1959 he was a writer, book reviewer, lecturer and newspaper correspondent for the North American Newspaper Alliance from 1951 to 1952.

Christowe won a seat in the Vermont Legislature as a state representative, serving two consecutive terms in 1961 and 1963.

He ran for a senate seat in 1965, winning his county's Republican nomination in a landslide. Christowe was reelected in 1968, later retiring in 1972. Senator Robert Gannet succeeded him.

Christowe's colleague, senator William Doyle, referred to him as "an original". His advocacy for freedom, equality and education for all is best remembered in a speech he made on the occasion of a proposed amendment to change the Constitution of Vermont.

Mr. President! The idea that our State's Constitution needs redefining of some of its most sacred definitions is preposterous.

What's wrong with the way it's now? Do you want the Constitution to discriminate? Our constitution speaks of natural and naturalized citizens - a distinction without discrimination. These terms give us all the right to feel equally American!

Redefining it to read 'citizen' and 'natural citizen' implies that to be a citizen is less than if you are a natural citizen. Mr. Chairman, it is just as important that America is born in the man, and maybe even more so, than the man is born in America

— Vermont Senate, 1971

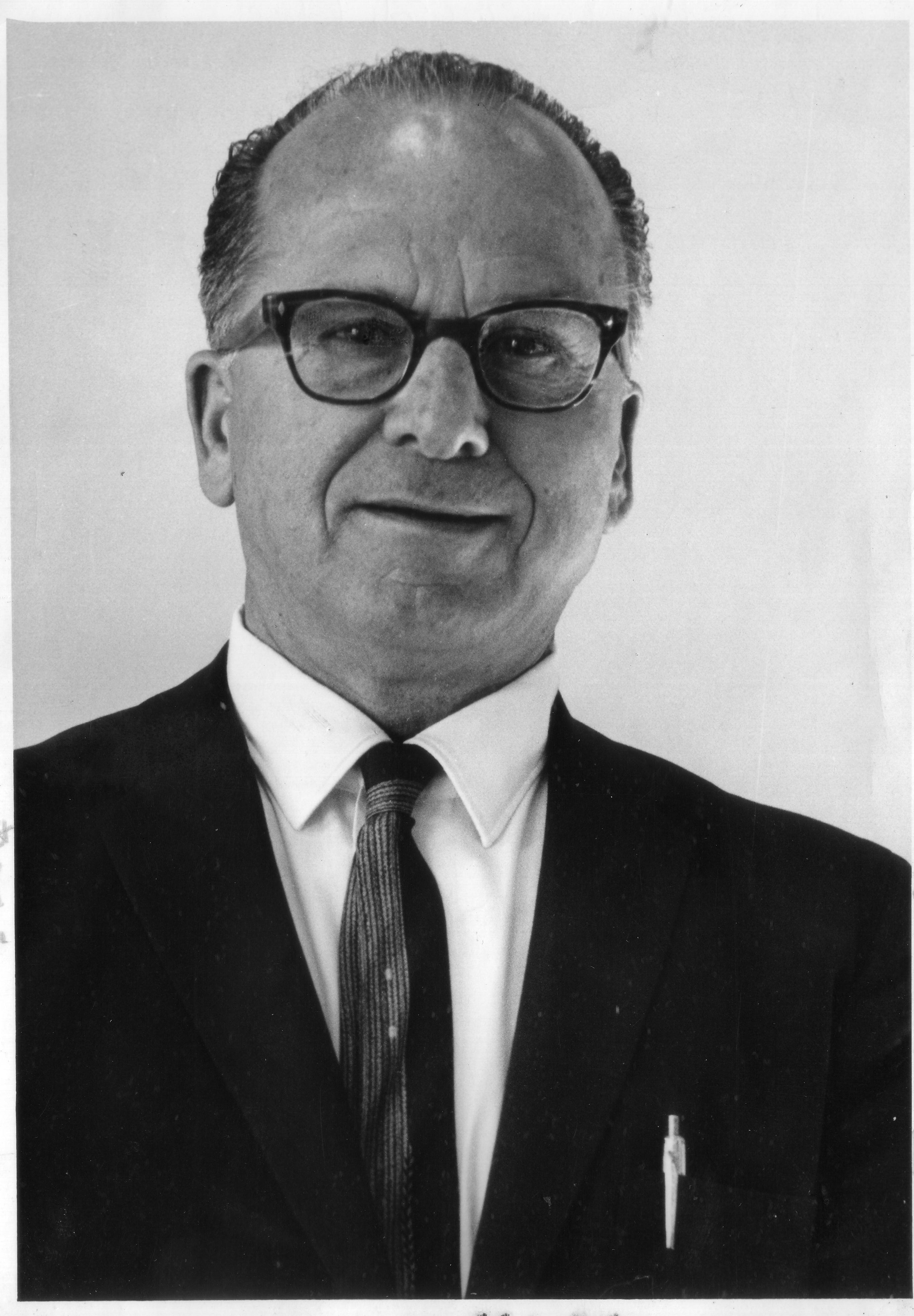
Senator Stoyan Christowe, 1964

Retiring from the Senate in 1972, Christowe immediately returned to writing. His last autobiographical novel, The Eagle and the Stork, was published in 1976. The book remains his most widely read novel.

Christowe enjoyed relative notoriety as a writer during the 1930 and 1940s. His writing capabilities allotted him the power to inspire and persuade his readers. His numerous written works from his time as a correspondent in the Balkans contributed to the understanding of Southeastern European history in the early twentieth century. . At home, during his years as a politician he served as a beacon shining light on what was good and right in America. His message to those not born in the US was to have faith in oneself, accept this country and its language and grow with it, and embrace one's own inner changes. He encouraged people to embrace their roots as well. "America has room for people who are Americans with origins elsewhere, it is the genius of the country."

== Legacy ==
- In 2006, the Macedonian Arts Council erected a landmark of its most famous resident in a joint venture with the local government of Dover, Vermont.
- In 2010, the Macedonian Arts Council founded the Stoyan Christowe Scholarship Fund. The scholarship is available exclusively to students of literature and political science at Macedonian universities.

== Bibliography ==
External image
- Christowe's land marker in Dover, Vermont

=== Books ===
- Heroes and Assassins, Robert M. McBride (1935)
- Mara, Thomas Y. Crowell Co. (1937)
- This is my country, Carrick & Evans, Inc. (1938), one of the favorite books of Franklin Roosevelt
- The Lion Of Yanina, Modern Age Books (1941)
- My American Pilgrimage, Little, Brown and Company, 1947
- The Eagle and the Stork, Harper's Magazine Press (1976)
- The Immigrant's Bride, Christowe's last unknown manuscript published in Macedonian

== See also ==
- Macedonian writers
- Macedonian American
- Macedonian nationalism
