= Novo Konomladi =

Village in Blagoevgrad Province, Bulgaria

Novo Konomladi Ново Кономлади
- Village
- Location within Bulgaria
- Coordinates: 41°27′N 23°20′E
- Country: Bulgaria
- Province: Blagoevgrad Province
- Municipality: Petrich Municipality
- Elevation: 152 m (499 ft)

Population (2007)
  - Total: 171
- Time zone: UTC+2 (EET)
  - Summer (DST): UTC+3 (EEST)

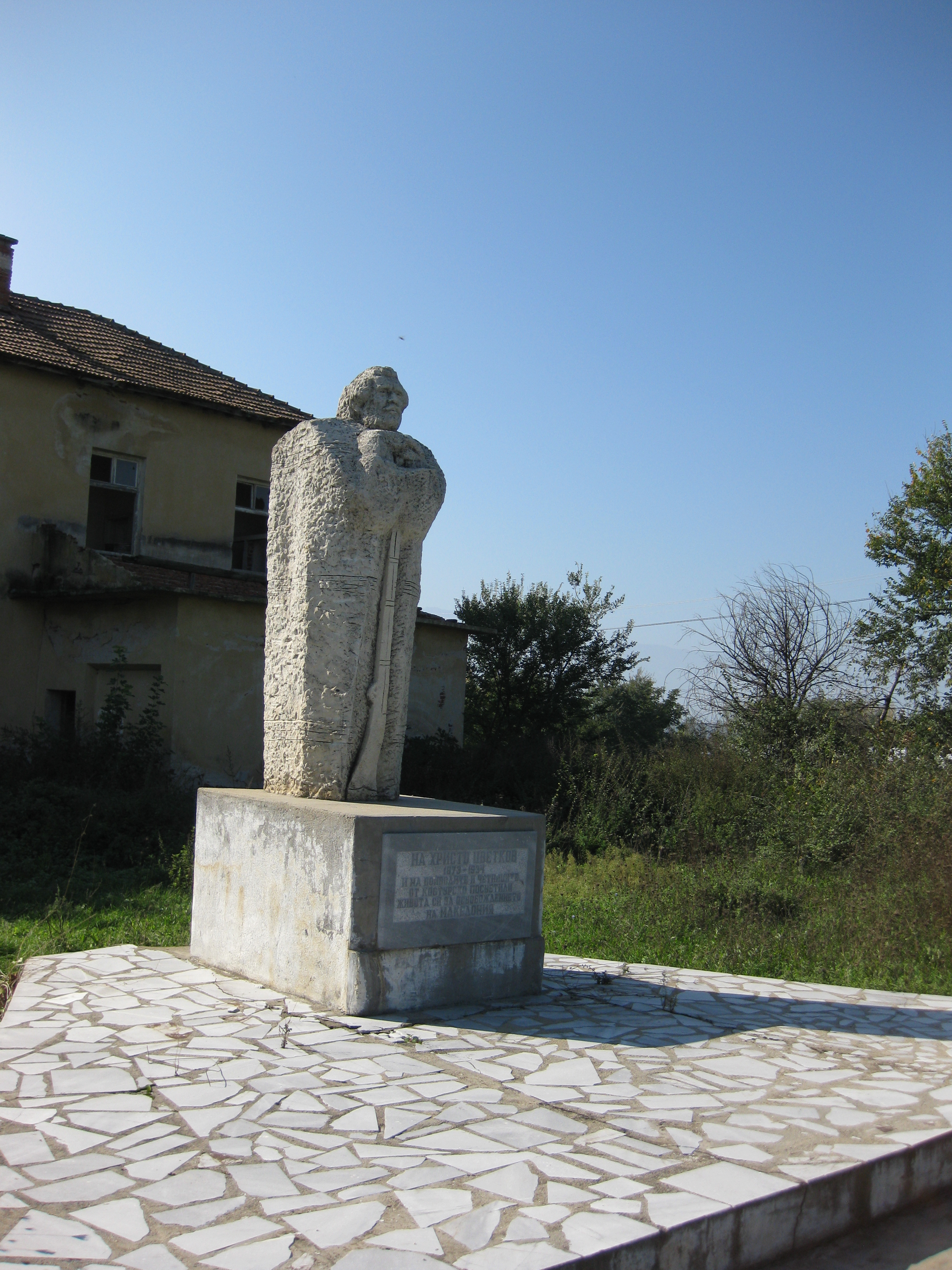
Monument in the village

Novo Konomladi (Bulgarian: Ново Кономлади New Konomladi) is a village in Petrich Municipality, in Blagoevgrad Province, Bulgaria.

== History ==
Most of the modern population of Novo Konomladi descends from Bulgarian refugees from the village of Konomladi (present-day Makrochori), Western Macedonia, Greece, who relocated to Bulgaria after the Balkan Wars of 1912–1913.

There were 302 inhabitants in the village in 1985.
