= Monika Herceg =

Croatian feminist, poet, playwright and editor (born 1990)

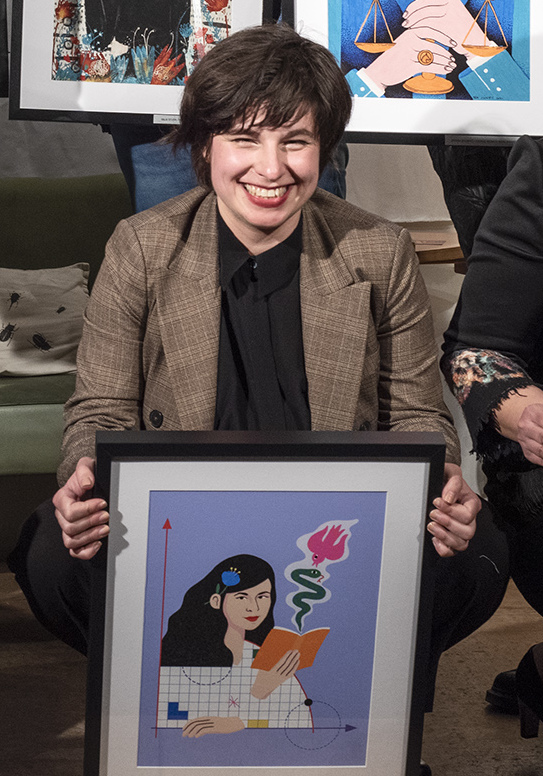
- Herceg in 2021
- Born: 1990 (age 35–36); Sisak, Sisak-Moslavina County, Croatia
- Education: University of Rijeka
- Occupations: Poet; playwright; editor

Monika Herceg is a poet, playwright, editor, essayist and feminist from Croatia. Her poems have been translated into more than twenty languages, including French, German, English and Lithuanian, and she has received more than twenty awards for her work.

== Early life and education ==
Herceg was born in Sisak in 1990, and grew up in a village near the city. Her hometown was not far from the northern edge of the Republic of Serbian Krajina, an unrecognized Serb quasi-state that was active during the Croatian War of Independence. Herceg's formative years were therefore spent in the proximity of a war zone, which has influenced her work as an adult. She has spent more than ten years in exile.

As a youth, Herceg felt "cut off from the rest of the world" due to her village's remote location. Her relatives were not habitual readers; she has described having no books in her house while growing up, but she was able to access reading materials with the help of her schoolteachers.

Herceg began writing poetry while studying physics, financing her studies by working several jobs. One of these positions was hosting a student radio program named "Science on the Air," which communicated complex scientific topics to a wider audience.

== Career ==
Herceg first received recognition in 2017, when she won the Goran for Young Poets Award for her book Početne koordinate (Initial Coordinates). Told in the voice of Herceg's grandmother, Initial Coordinates portrays the experiences of impoverished women in twentieth-century rural Croatia. The following year, Herceg won the Kvirin Award for Young Poets and the Fran Galović Prize.

At the 2019 Struga Poetry Evenings festival in Macedonia, Herceg was recognised as that year's Bridges of Struga Laureate. Later in the year, she became a member of Versopolis, a poetry platform supported by the European Union's Creative Europe Program that works to promote poets from the continent.

=== Influences ===
Herceg believes that making science accessible to the masses is important to combat misinformation, and she often incorporates scientific concepts and thoughts into her creative work.

== Activism ==
=== Scientific literacy ===
Herceg has criticised the anti-vaccination movement and creationism, describing them as anti-scientific and harmful to social progress. She has participated as a volunteer in hosting science workshops for children. Herceg has described Vera Rubin as her scientific hero.

=== Feminism ===
Herceg is a feminist, which has influenced her body of work. Her 2020 play, Where Tenderness is Brought, was written to bring attention to the matter of violence against women and intergenerational trauma. This work received the Croatian National Theatre Award for the best new play. The next year, she was awarded by the Fierce Women project, a beneficiary of the European Social Fund, for her activism.

=== Free speech and human rights ===
Herceg is a member of the Croatian P.E.N Centre, an arm of the international writers' association, PEN International. The centre's work concerns defending freedom of speech and advancing human rights through journalism and publishing. In May 2025, Herceg signed a statement in her role as a member of the Centre extending support for then-ongoing student protests in Serbia.

In 2020, she attended a commemoration of the 1991 murder of the Zec family organised by the Anti-Fascist League of Croatia, where she read verses.

While accepting the Gdańsk Literary Award at the European Poet of Freedom Festival in 2024, Herceg drew awareness to the European migrant crisis, the death tolls of the Russo-Ukrainian War and Genocide in Gaza, and abortion rights in Europe.

== Personal life ==
Herceg lives and works as an editor in Zagreb, and is a mother to two children. She is a member of the Croatian Writers Society, having served on the editorial board of its magazine since 2021.

== Awards ==
- 2017: Goran Award for Young Poets; Castello di Duino; Stevan Sremac Award
- 2018: Kvirin Award for Young Poets; Fran Galović Award for the Best Book; Slavić Award for the Best Debut; Na vrh jezika Award; Mostovi Struge International Award for the Best Debut
- 2019: Lapis Histrie Award for the Best Short Story; Biber Award for the Best Short Story
- 2020: Zvonko Milković Award for Best Book; Priče s Balkana Award for Best Short Drama Script; National Theatre in Zagreb Award for the Best Drama Script
- 2021: Marin Držić Drama Script Award; National Theatre in Mostar Award for Best Drama Scripts; Fierce Woman Award
- 2022: Milo Bošković Award
- 2023: Ranko Marinković Award for Best Short Story
- 2024: European Poet of Freedom Award; Central European Initiative Award for Young Writers; National Theatre in Mostar Award for Best Drama Scripts; Biber Award for the Best Short Story

== Works ==
- Početne koordinate (Initial Coordinates), Zagreb, 2018
- Lovostaj (Closed season), Zagreb: Jesenski i Turk, 2019 and Beograd; Kontrast, 2020
- Vrijeme prije jezika (Time Before the Tongue), Zagreb: Fraktura, 2020 and Beograd; Kontrast, 2021
- Gdje se kupuju nježnosti (2020) (Where to Buy Tenderness), drama script
- Mrtve ne treba micati (2020) (Dead should not be moved), short drama script
- Ubij se, tata (Kill yourself, dear Dad) (2020), drama script
- Zakopana čuda (Buried miracles) (2020), drama script
- Ubij se, tata (Kill yourself, dear Dad) (2020), Fraktura 2022 (book of collected plays)

Translations

- Ciel sous tension, trans. Martina Kramer, Paris: L’Ollave, 2019
- Monika Herceg, Poetinis Druskininku ruduo, Vilnius: 2019
- Wo Lyrik zuhause ist, trans. Jelena Dabić Austrija, 2020
- Početni koordinati, trans. Đoko Zdraveski, PNV, Skopje, 2020
- Lovostoj., trans. Đoko Zdraveski, PNV, Skopje, 2021
- OÙ LES TENDRESSES S'ACHÈTENT-ELLES, Nicolas Raljević, Paris: Prozor Editions, 2021
- Initial Coordinates, USA, Sandorf Passage, 2022
- Початкові координати, Krok Press, Ternopil, Galicia, Ukraine
- Αρχικές συντεταγμένες, trans. Marouso Athanasiou, Thraca, Greece, 2022
- Jagdverbot, trans. Ivana Pajić, Eta Verlag, Berlin, 2023
- Okres Ochronny, trans. Aleksandra Wojtaszek, Instytut Kultury Miejskiej, Gdanjsk, 2023
- Kohë e ndaluar për gjueti (Lovostaj), trans. Linda Mala, Albania 2024
