= Božin Pavlovski =

Macedonian-Australian novelist (born 1942)

Bozin Pavlovski
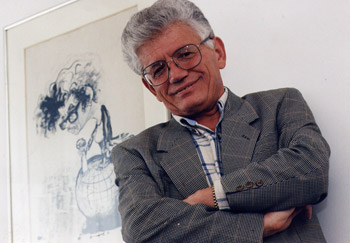
- Born: January 7, 1942 (age 84); Žvan, Republic of Macedonia
- Writing career
- Notable awards: Interbalkan Award for Literature (Greece) (2002)
- Website: bozinpavlovski.com

Božin Pavlovski (Macedonian: Божин Павловски) is a Macedonian-Australian novelist whose works have been translated into more than twenty languages. He is a novelist–mediator between two cultures whose novels interpret the binary logic by which his characters are both “here” and in the country in which they were born or originate from.

He was born in Žvan, Demir Hisar, now North Macedonia, on January 7, 1942. He has lived in the former Yugoslavia and the United States, but he has been based in Melbourne, Australia, since 1991. Pavlovski studied literature at the University of Skopje and graduated in 1971. For over thirty years he was editor and publisher of world literature in the former Yugoslavia. Since 1989, he has divided his time as a professional novelist traveling between Europe and Australia.

Bozin Pavlovski's novels, particularly those he has written since he has adopted Australia as his second homeland, unveil the phenomena of reterritorialized cultures and describe the meetings, conversations and thoughts of two or sometimes more cultures, communities, and languages which exist in a single space. Pavlovski's novels can be said to be a part of a transnational literature which has an increasing importance in a contemporary world whose significant characteristics are those of dislocation and relocation, and from where stems his writing between histories, geographies and cultural practices.

== Literary works ==
=== Novels ===
- Miladin from China
- Duva and The Flea
- West Aust
- The Red Hypocrite
- The Neighboring Owl
- Return to Fairy Tales
- Eagle Coat of Arms
- Journey with My Beloved
- Dreaming on the Road
- A Novel for My Departure
- The Agony of Macedonia
- The Milk of Human Kindness
- The Beauty and The Marauder
- Winter in Summer
- Call Me Hi Goodbye
- Shining Creek
- The Horn of Love
- Gardener, Desert
- The Monk from Tamnava
- America, America
- Memoir of a forgotten romantic
- On the Road to Ahasveria
- Forgive the Beast

=== Short stories and non-fiction ===
- Fantasti
- Ludisti
- Makedoncite otade Ekvatorot
- Collection of short stories
- Taga za mojata prva tatkovina
- Nazad kon razumot
- Rozovo na crnoto

== Recognitions and awards ==
In 1988, Bozin Pavlovski was elected as a member of Macedonian Academy of Sciences and Arts in the Department of Literature.

His works have more than 80 foreign editions and more than 160 Macedonian editions.

Pavlovski has won numerous foreign and Macedonian literary awards including the Interbalkan Award for Literature in Greece (2002). Other literary awards include:

- 1962 First prize for short story (Skopje)
- 1967 First prize for the novel 'Miladin from China' (Belgrade)
- 1973 'Ratsinovo Priznanie' for the novel 'Duva and the Flea' (Veles)
- 1976 Grand Prix for best scenario for the documentary film 'Australia, Australia' (Belgrade)
- 1978 '11 October' Award for the novel 'West Aust'
- 1980 'Pechalbarska Povelba' for the novel 'West Aust' (Vevcani)
- 1982 'Goceva Povelba' for the novel 'The Red Hypocrite' (Podgorci)
- 1985 Golden Medal for literary activities (Belgrade)
- 1987 'Zelezara Susak' for the novel 'The Neighboring Owl' (Zagreb)
- 1987 'Kocho Ratcin' Award for the novel 'The Neighboring Owl' (Skopje)
- 1987 'Stale Popov' Award for the novel 'The Neighboring Owl' (Skopje)
- 1996 'Goceva Povelba' for the novel 'Eagle Coat of Arms' (Podgorci)
- 2002 Interbalkan Award for Literature in Greece for the novel 'Journey With My Beloved' (Thessaloniki)
- 2003 Award for Best Selling Novel - 'Dreaming on the Road' (Skopje International Book Fair)
- 2004 Award for Best Selling Novel - 'The Agony' (Skopje International Book Fair)
- 2006 'Ratsinovo Priznanie' for the novel 'The Beauty and The Marauder' (Veles)
- 2007 'Excelsior' for the novel 'The Beauty and The Marauder' in Romania (Kurtea de Arges)
- 2008 '11 October' Award for the opus (Skopje)
- 2010 'Duhoven Voin' Award for literature (Struga)
- 2014 'Prozni majstori' Award for the novel 'The Horn of Love'
- 2014 'Stale Popov' Award for the novel 'The Horn of Love'
