= Makrochori =

Village in Western Macedonia, Greece

- Community
- Location within Greece
- Coordinates: 40°40′24″N 21°15′48″E
- Country: Greece
- Geographic region: Macedonia
- Administrative region: Western Macedonia
- Regional unit: Kastoria
- Municipality: Kastoria
- Municipal unit: Korestia
- Elevation: 930 m (3,050 ft)

Population (2021)
  - Community: 93
- Time zone: UTC+2 (EET)
  - Summer (DST): UTC+3 (EEST)

Makrochori (Greek: Μακροχώρι, before 1928: Κωνομπλάτη – Konomplati; Bulgarian and Macedonian: Кономлади, Konomladi), is a village of Kastoria regional unit in Western Macedonia, Greece.

== History ==
According to a local legend, the village was founded by three brothers who fled from the Ottoman Turks in the village of Tser.

The castle of Makrochori is located 4 km west of the village, is considered a large organized facility. The settlement developed on the bank of the present river Livadopotamos, reaches up to a point, its citadel, and hosted an important mining center of Orestis since in many places volumes of iron ore were found.

A village in Petrich Municipality, Blagoevgrad Province, Bulgaria, is named Novo Konomladi (Bulgarian: Ново Кономлади, "New Konomladi"). This is because it was mostly populated by Bulgarian refugees from Makrochori who moved to Bulgaria after the Balkan Wars of 1912–1913.

The 1920 Greek census recorded 1,031 people in the village and the 1928 Greek census recorded 802 inhabitants. Following the Greek–Turkish population exchange, Greek refugee families in Konomplati numbered 2 (11 people) in 1928.

In 1945, Greek Foreign Minister Ioannis Politis ordered the compilation of demographic data regarding the Prefecture of Kastoria. The village Makrochori had a total of 1,031 inhabitants, and was populated by 1,000 Slavophones with a Bulgarian national consciousness. The inhabitants speak the Dolna Koreshcha variant of the Kostur dialect.

== Νotable natives ==
- Mitre the Vlach (1873–1907), Aromanian IMARO revolutionary
- Stoyan Christowe (1898–1995), American writer
- Nikos Gioutsos (1942–2023), Greek football striker
