= Savo Kostadinovski =

Macedonian-German writer

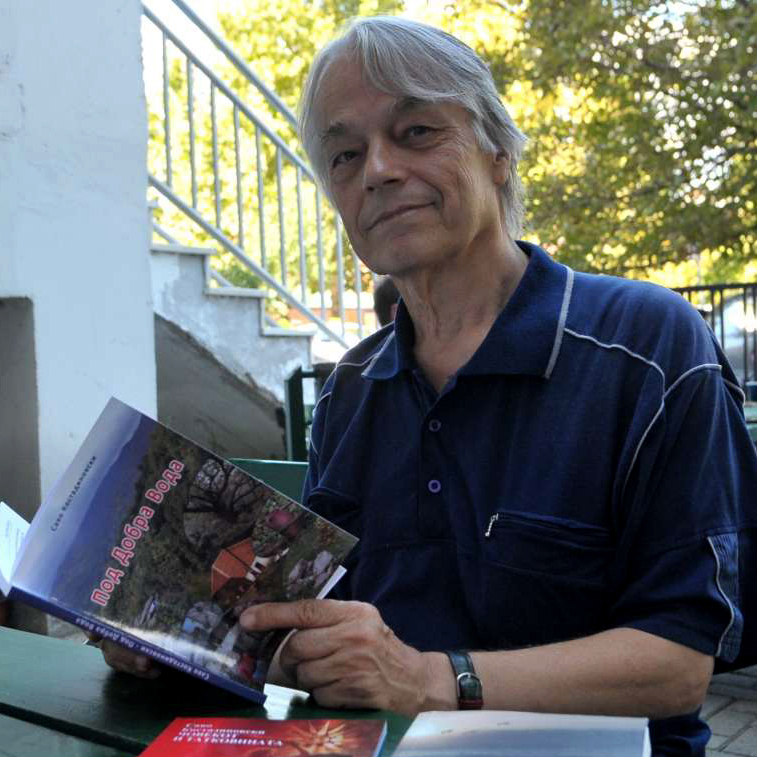
- Born: Саво Костадиновски; May 30, 1950 (age 76); Gorno Botušje, FPR Yugoslavia

Savo Kostadinovski (Macedonian: Саво Костадиновски; born May 30, 1950) is a Macedonian-German writer and translator.

== Life and career ==
Savo Kostadinovski was born in Gorno Botušje, municipality of Makedonski Brod, in present-day North Macedonia. He attended elementary school in Gorno Botušje and Gostivar and continued his education in Belgrade and Cologne. He has lived in Germany since 1971.

He is the author of poems for children and adults, short stories, essays, translations, and journalistic texts. His works are included in anthologies and school textbooks in North Macedonia. They are being published in German, Macedonian, Serbian, and Romanian language. He won the "Iselenička Gramota" Award at the Struga Poetry Evenings 1993.

He is a member of the Association of Macedonian Writers, the Association of German Writers, the Association of Literary Translators of Macedonia, and the Association of Macedonian Journalists.

He is included in the Encyclopedia of the National Diaspora, edited by chronicler Ivan Kalauzović Ivanus.

== Selected bibliography ==
=== Books for children ===
- Leto vo rodniot kraj (Detska radost, 1980)
- Kopneži (Cultural Center "Kočo Racin", 1989)
- Decata na svetot (Cultural Center "Kočo Racin", 1990)
- Pesni (Cultural and Educational Community of Skopje, 1991)
- Poreče (Misla, 1995)
- Iljada i edna nostalgija (Detska radost, 2001)
- Stihuvani godini (Antolog, 2013)
- Makedonski znamenitosti (Antolog, 2016)
- Pesni za deca (Akademski pečat, 2018)
- Dedovcite i vnucite (Akademska misla, 2023)

=== Books for adults ===
- Trite veka (Makedonska reč, 2005)
- Roden kraj so srce (Makedonska reč, 2005)
- Poezija za poezijata (Matica makedonska, 2012)
- Poezijata vo životot na poetot (Makedonika litera, 2013)
- Život za Botuše (Makedonika litera, 2014)
- Istorija na vojnite (Makedonika litera, 2015)
- Pod dobra voda (Antolog, 2016)
- Sѐ od ljubov za Poreče i Porečani (Antolog, 2017)
- Pisatelot od Poreče (Akademski pečat, 2018)
- Pojasnuvanja (Akademski pečat, 2021)

== Literature ==
- Pavlovski, J.; Siljan, R.; Smilevski, V.; Todorovski, G. (2004). Macedonian Writers. Skopje, North Macedonia: Association of Macedonian Writers. pp. 124–125. ISBN 9989-855-07-2.
- Kalauzović, I., ed. (2025). Encyclopedia of the National Diaspora. Niš, Serbia: Impressions Publishing. ISBN 978-86-82470-02-1.
