= Petre Dimovski =

Macedonian writer and journalist

Petre Dimovski (born 1946 in Brod, Bitola, Macedonia) is a Macedonian narrator, novelist and monodrama author.

== Biography ==
Petre Dimovski was born 1946 in Brod, Bitola, Macedonia. He finished his primary school in village Bac and his secondary education in Bitola. After he had finished his secondary edition he immigrated to Australia where he stayed until 1969. After his return he enrolled at the Faculty of Philology in Skopje where he graduated in 1975. Then he worked as journalist. He participated in the work of editorship of the magazine Razvitok as prose editor and he is chief and executive editor of the magazine Rast. He is a member of the Macedonian Scientific Association from Bitola and the Macedonian Writers Association and he is president of Bitola Literature Circle. At the moment he is a professor in Bitola.

== Published works ==
- Turning points (stories 1973)
- Thrust and heats (stories 1994)
- Plamenka (novel 1996)
- Reserve secret (novel 1997)
- Wings (novel 1998)
- The son of the cell (novel 2000)
- Not his own (mono drama 2002)
- The black cat (stories 2002)
- Balkan devil (novel 2004)
- The big adventure (novel 2007)
- Search of the roots (novel 2008)

He was a composer of the Children story anthology in Macedonian literature by the Government of The Republic of Macedonia.

== Awards ==
- Story of the Sightless Horse Nova Macedonia Award (1971)
- Turning Points winner of Literary youth, and nomination for Federation award Mladost.
- 4 November Award, for the book Thrust and Heats,
- BID Misirkov Award for novel Plamenka and award for novel The Son of the Cell by the same publisher
- Festival of Monodrama Award for Not his own
- Trend Award of the publishing house Feniks for novel Balkan Devil,
- Vanco Nikoleski Award from Macedonian Writers Association for novel The Big Adventure
- TV Orbis Award for novel Search of the Roots
