= Struga Poetry Evenings =

Golden Wreath Awards
- Location: Struga
- Country: North Macedonia
- Presented by: Struga Poetry Evenings
- First award: 1966
- Final award: present
- Website: www.svp.org.mk

Struga Poetry Evenings (SPE) (Macedonian: Струшки вечери на поезијата, СВП; Albanian: Mbrëmjet e Poezisë në Strugë, MPS) is an international poetry festival held annually in Struga, North Macedonia. During the several decades of its existence, the Festival has awarded its most prestigious award, the Golden Wreath, to some of the most notable international poets, including: Mahmoud Darwish, Sachchidananda Hirananda Vatsyayan Agyey, W. H. Auden, Joseph Brodsky, Allen Ginsberg, Bulat Okudzhava, Pablo Neruda, Eugenio Montale, Léopold Sédar Senghor, Artur Lundkvist, Hans Magnus Enzensberger, Nichita Stănescu, Ted Hughes, Ko Un, Adunis, Makoto Ooka, Miroslav Krleža, Yehuda Amichai, Seamus Heaney, Tomas Gösta Tranströmer, Bei Dao, Amir Or and domestic authors such as Blaže Koneski and Mateja Matevski.

== History ==
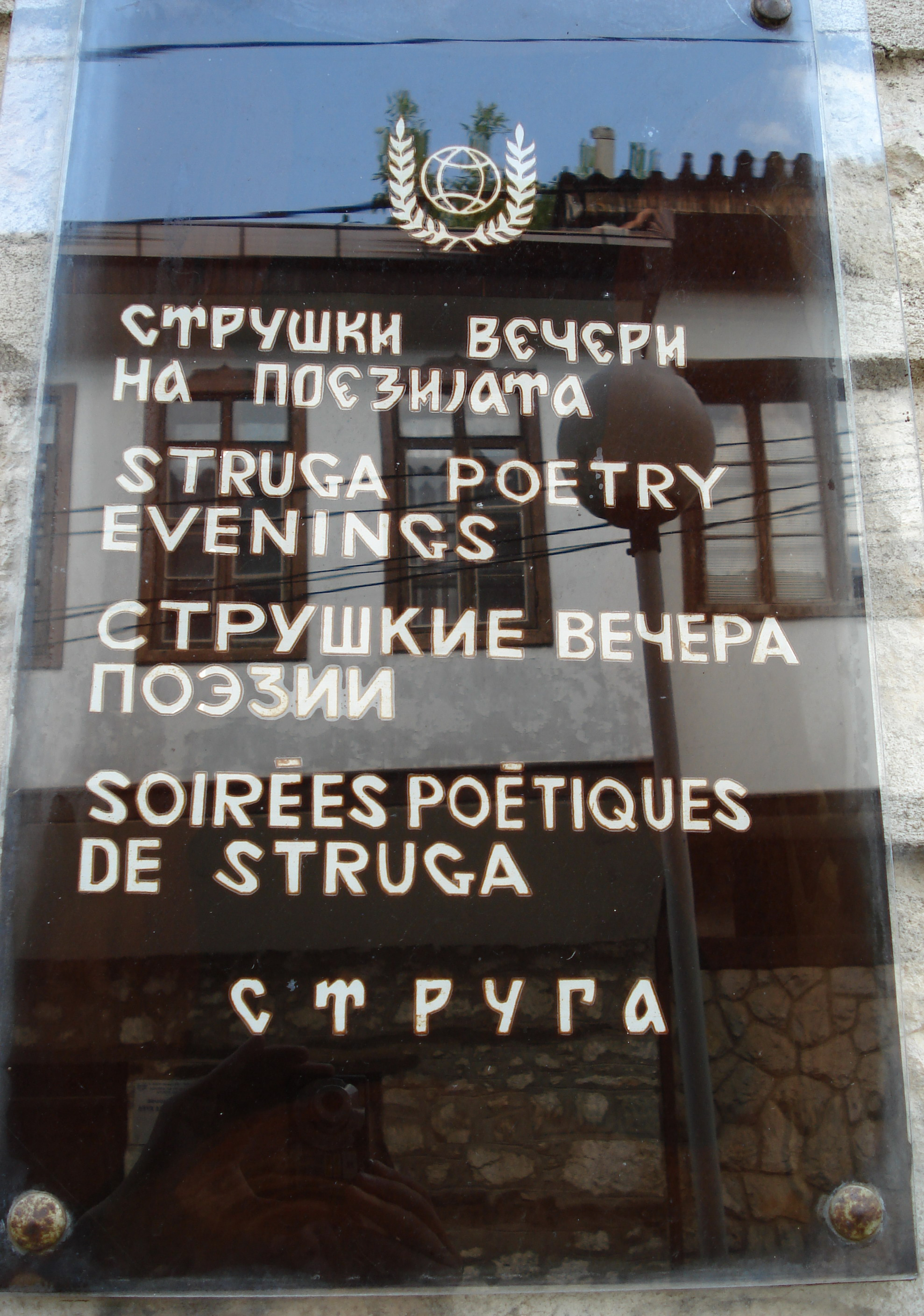
Office of Struga Poetry Evenings in Struga.

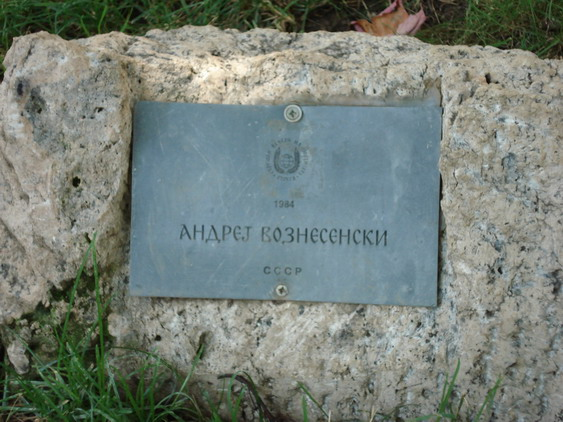
Andrey Voznesensky's memorial board in the Park of Poetry in Struga

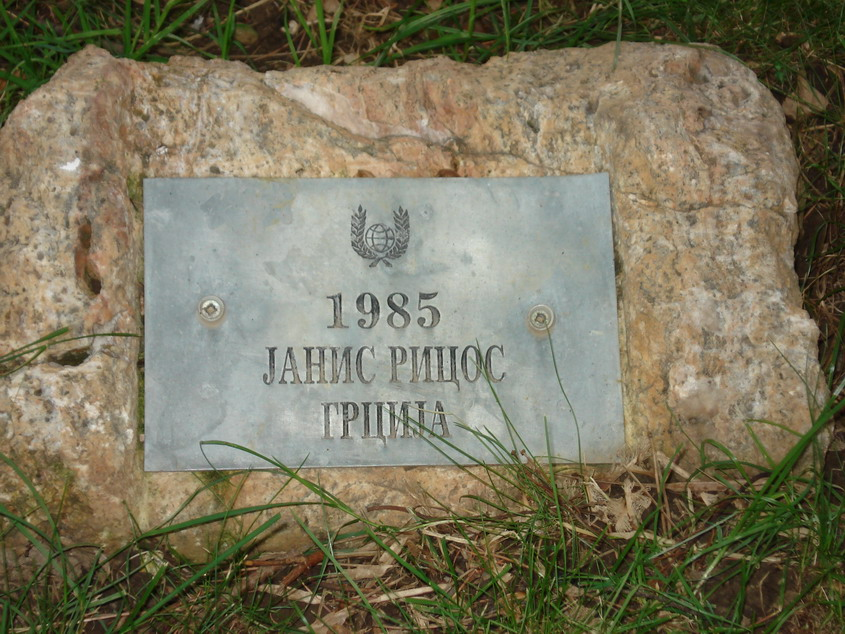
Yiannis Ritsos's memorial board

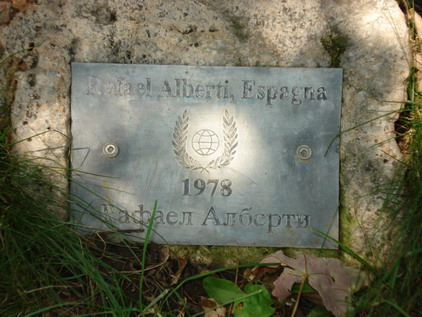
Rafael Alberti's memorial board

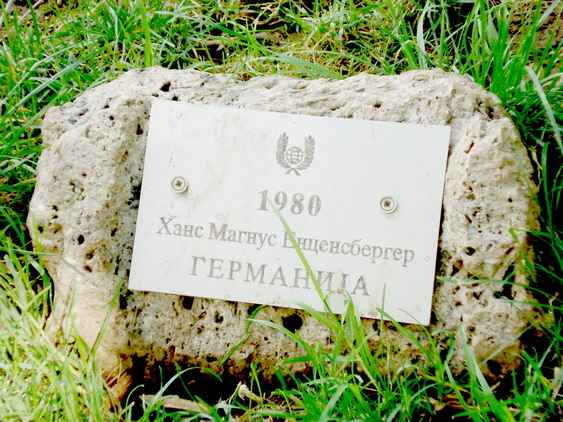
Hans Magnus Enzensberger's memorial board

The festival began in 1961 in Struga, then People's Republic of Macedonia with Macedonian poets only, while in 1963 it expanded its list of participants with poets from all around the former Socialist Federal Republic of Yugoslavia. The Miladinov Brothers Award was established for the best poetry book published between two consecutive festivals, which became the most important national poetry award. By 1966 the event turned into an international cultural festival. The Golden Wreath international award was established in the same year and its first recipient was Robert Rozhdestvensky. In 2003, in close cooperation with UNESCO, the Festival established another international award called The Bridges of Struga, for a best debut poetry book by a young author. During its long successful existence, the festival has hosted about 4,000 poets, translators, essayists and literary critics from about 95 countries of the world.

The festival has awarded some of the world's most eminent literary figures, including several Nobel Prize for Literature winners such as Joseph Brodsky, Eugenio Montale, Pablo Neruda and Seamus Heaney, the first African member of the French Academy Léopold Sédar Senghor who was also a President of Senegal, the official royal Poet Laureate Ted Hughes, W. H. Auden who is regarded by many as one of the greatest writers of the 20th century and many others.

A point of interest is that the festival often awarded foreign poets who were considered dissidents in their countries, including for example the Russian exiled poet Joseph Brodsky, the Chilean poet Pablo Neruda, the American beatnik Allen Ginsberg, the Soviet bard Bulat Okudzhava and many others.

In memory of the laureates, the Park of Poetry featuring memorial boards dedicated to each of them was established near the Struga Cultural Center.

== Organization ==
The festival has offices in Struga and in Skopje (an office director, an executive and a technical secretary) and is organized by a Festival Board, which consists of knowledgeable professionals in the field of poetry (poets, literary critics, translators, and professors in comparative literature and culture).

== Events ==
The festival consists of several events held at different locations:

- Opening ceremony on the plateau in front of the Cultural Centre in Struga including a traditional reading of Taga za Jug (Macedonian language: Т’га за југ, A Longing for The South), the famous nostalgic lyrical poem written by the Struga-born poet Konstantin Miladinov during his life in Imperial Russia.
- Meridijani (Меридијани, Meridians) a poetry reading by various international poets in the Cultural Centre following the opening ceremony.
- Portret na Laureatot (Портрет на Лауреатот, Portrait of the Lauerate) an event devoted to the year's main award recipient traditionally held in the church of St. Sofia in the nearby city of Ohrid usually accompanied by classical music, opera or domestic or foreign ethnic music performance.
- Noći bez interpukcija (Ноќи без интерпукција, Nights without Punctuation) multimedia artistic events featuring experimental forms of poetic presentations, which can also include other arts like music and video art.
- Daily poetry picnic at Sveti Naum springs near the Ohrid Lake including Ethnic Macedonian music and dances.
- Mostovi (Мостови, Bridges) the closing ceremony held at the Bridge of Poetry on the river Drim in Struga including poetry readings and the awarding ceremony.

Other events include workshops, round-table discussions on various social topics and their influence on poetry, etc.

Another event in the so-called Caravan of Poetry, which consists of poetry performances around the country. Usually, after the end of the Festival, the Festival also organizes poetry readings in the national capital, Skopje.

== Awards ==
- Zlaten Venec na Poezijata (Златен Венец на Поезијата, Golden Wreath of Poetry), the main international award given to a world-renowned living poet for life achievement in the field of poetry. The recipient's name is publicized usually several months in advance.
- Brakja Miladinovci (Браќа Миладиновци, Miladinov Brothers Award), the main national poetry award, for a best book published between two editions of the festival.
- The Bridges of Struga, for a best debuting author.
- Iselenička gramota, for poets from the Macedonian diaspora.

=== Golden Wreath Laureates ===
- 1966 Robert Rozhdestvensky (USSR)
- 1967 Bulat Okudzhava (USSR)
- 1968 László Nagy (Hungary)
- 1969 Mak Dizdar (SR Bosnia and Herzegovina, SFR Yugoslavia)
- 1970 Miodrag Pavlović (SR Serbia, SFR Yugoslavia)
- 1971 W. H. Auden (United States)
- 1972 Pablo Neruda (Chile)
- 1973 Eugenio Montale (Italy)
- 1974 Fazıl Hüsnü Dağlarca (Turkey)
- 1975 Léopold Sédar Senghor (Senegal)
- 1976 Eugène Guillevic (France)
- 1977 Artur Lundkvist (Sweden)
- 1978 Rafael Alberti (Spain)
- 1979 Miroslav Krleža (SR Croatia, SFR Yugoslavia)
- 1980 Hans Magnus Enzensberger (West Germany)
- 1981 Blaže Koneski (SR Macedonia, SFR Yugoslavia)
- 1982 Nichita Stănescu (Romania)
- 1983 Sachchidananda Hirananda Vatsyayan Agyey (India)
- 1984 Andrey Voznesensky (USSR)
- 1985 Yiannis Ritsos (Greece)
- 1986 Allen Ginsberg (United States)
- 1987 Tadeusz Różewicz (Poland)
- 1988 Desanka Maksimović (SR Serbia, SFR Yugoslavia)
- 1989 Thomas W. Shapcott (Australia)
- 1990 Justo Jorge Padrón (Spain)
- 1991 Joseph Brodsky (United States)
- 1992 Ferenc Juhász (Hungary)
- 1993 Gennadiy Aygi (Chuvash Republic, Russian Federation)
- 1994 Ted Hughes (United Kingdom)
- 1995 Yehuda Amichai (Israel)
- 1996 Makoto Ooka (Japan)
- 1997 Adunis (Syria)
- 1998 Liu Banjiu (China)
- 1999 Yves Bonnefoy (France)
- 2000 Edoardo Sanguineti (Italy)
- 2001 Seamus Heaney (Ireland)
- 2002 Slavko Mihalić (Croatia)
- 2003 Tomas Tranströmer (Sweden)
- 2004 Vasco Graça Moura (Portugal)
- 2005 William S. Merwin (United States)
- 2006 Nancy Morejón (Cuba)
- 2007 Mahmoud Darwish (Palestine)
- 2008 Fatos Arapi (Albania)
- 2009 Tomaž Šalamun (Slovenia)
- 2010 Lyubomir Levchev (Bulgaria)
- 2011 Mateja Matevski (Macedonia)
- 2012 Mongane Wally Serote (South Africa)
- 2013 José Emilio Pacheco (Mexico)
- 2014 Ko Un (South Korea)
- 2015 Bei Dao (China)
- 2016 Margaret Atwood (Canada)
- 2017 Charles Simic (United States)
- 2018 Adam Zagajewski (Poland)
- 2019 Ana Blandiana (Romania)
- 2020 Amir Or (Israel)
- 2021 Carol Ann Duffy (United Kingdom)
- 2022 Shuntarō Tanikawa (Japan)
- 2023 Vlada Urošević (North Macedonia)
- 2024 Jean-Pierre Siméon (France)
- 2025 Ivan Štrpka (Slovakia)

=== Miladinov Brothers Award Laureates ===
- 1963 Mateja Matevski
- 1964 Ante Popovski
- 1967 Vlada Urošević
- 1968 Petre M. Andreevski
- 1969 Mile Nedelkoski
- 1970 Petar T. Boškovski
- 1971 Petre M. Andreevski
- 1971 Bogomil Gjuzel
- 1972 Bogomil Gjuzel
- 1973 Vlada Urošević
- 1974 Blaže Koneski
- 1975 Gane Todorovski
- 1976 Aco Šopov
- 1977 Atanas Vangelov
- 1978 Milovan Stefanoski
- 1979 Slavko Janevski
- 1980 Eftim Kletnikov
- 1981 Mateja Matevski
- 1982 Mihail Rendžov
- 1983 Adem Gajtani
- 1984 Todor Čalovski
- 1985 Liljana Dirjan
- 1986 Vlada Urošević
- 1987 Petko Dabeski
- 1988 Slavko Janevski
- 1989 Katica Kulavkova
- 1990 Rade Siljan
- 1991 Risto Vasilevski
- 1992 Jordan Danilovski
- 1993 Branko Cvetkoski
- 1994 Petre Bakevski
- 1995 Ante Popovski
- 1996 Svetlana Hristova-Jocić
- 1997 Gligor Stojkovski
- 1998 Gordana Mihailova-Bošnakoska
- 1999 Jovan Koteski
- 2000 Slave Gjorgo Dimoski
- 2001 Sande Stojčevski
- 2002 Radovan Pavlovski
- 2003 Eftim Kletnikov
- 2004 Petko Dabeski
- 2005 Petar T. Boškovski
- 2006 Bratislav Taškovski
- 2007 Nikola Madžirov
- 2008 Risto Lazarov
- 2009 Vesna Acevska
- 2010 Vladimir Martinovski
- 2011 Vele Smilevski
- 2012 Miloš Lindro
- 2013 Risto Jačev
- 2014 Vera Čejkovska
- 2015 Violeta Tančeva-Zlateva
- 2016 Ivan Džeparoski
- 2017 Mihail Rendžov
- 2018 Zoran Ančevski
- 2019 Jovica Ivanovski
- 2020 Iva Damjanovski
- 2021 Lidija Dimkovska
- 2022 Zoran Ančevski
- 2023 Dimitar Baševski

=== Bridges of Struga Laureates ===
- 2004 Angelo V. Suárez (Philippines)
- 2005 Andrea Cote (Colombia)
- 2006 Marianna Geide (Russia)
- 2007 Manua Rime (Belgium)
- 2008 Antonia Novakovic (Croatia)
- 2009 Ousmane Sarrouss (Senegal)
- 2010 Siim Kera (Estonia)
- 2011 Hiroshi Taniuchi (Japan)
- 2012 François-Xavier Maigre (France)
- 2013 Nikolina Andova Shopova (North Macedonia)
- 2014 Harry Man (United Kingdom)
- 2015 Paula Bozalongo (Spain)
- 2016 Runa Svetlikova (Belgium)
- 2017 Goran Čolakhodžić (Croatia)
- 2018 Pauli Tapio (Finland)
- 2019 Monika Herceg (Croatia)
- 2020 Martina Strakova (Slovak Republic)
- 2021 Vladan Kreckovic (Serbia)
- 2022 Gerardo Masuccio (Italy)

== Publications ==
The Struga Poetry Evenings organization is also involved in book publishing.

=== Poetry anthologies ===
- 1971 Contemporary Italian Poetry
- 1972 Contemporary Soviet Poetry
- 1972 Anthology of Romanian Poetry
- 1973 Contemporary Polish Poetry
- 1974 Contemporary Chilean Poetry
- 1976 Finnish Poetry
- 1977 Contemporary Algerian Poetry
- 1978 Contemporary Palestinian Poetry
- 1978 German Poetry of the 20th Century
- 1979 Modern American Poetry
- 1980 New Hungarian Poetry;
- 1980 Contemporary Indian Poetry
- 1981 Contemporary Greek Poetry
- 1982 Austrian Poetry of the 20th Century
- 1983 Contemporary Venezuelan Poetry;
- 1983 Contemporary Poetry of Czechoslovakia
- 1984 Contemporary Egyptian Poetry
- 1985 New Chinese Poetry
- 1987 Contemporary Australian Poetry
- 1988 Contemporary Swedish Poetry
- 1989 Contemporary Belgian Poetry
- 1990 Contemporary British Poetry
- 1991 Contemporary Swiss Poetry
- 1992 Contemporary Poetry of Luxembourg
- 1993 Contemporary Italian Poetry
- 1994 Contemporary German Poetry
- 1995 Contemporary Danish Poetry
- 1996 Contemporary Albanian Poetry
- 1997 Contemporary Korean Poetry
- 1998 Spanish Poetry of the 20th Century
- 1999 Contemporary Bulgarian Poetry
- 2000 Contemporary Russian Poetry
- 2001 Contemporary Portuguese Poetry
- 2002 Contemporary Tunisian Poetry
- 2003 Contemporary Indian Poetry written in English
- 2004 Contemporary Dutch Poetry
- 2005 Contemporary Israeli Poetry
- 2006 Contemporary Caribbean Poetry
- 2007 Contemporary Turkish Poetry
- 2008 Contemporary Ukrainian Poetry
- 2009 Contemporary Norwegian Poetry
- 2010 Contemporary Azerbaijan Poetry
- 2011 Poetry from Slavic countries
- 2012 Contemporary Mongolian Poetry
- 2013 Contemporary Slovenian Poetry
