= Jovica Tasevski-Eternijan =

Macedonian writer

Jovica Tasevski - Eternijan
- Born: July 25, 1976 (age 50); Skopje, SR Macedonia, SFR Yugoslavia
- Occupations: poet, essayist and literary critic

Jovica Tasevski-Eternijan (Macedonian: Јовица Тасевски - Етернијан, pronounced [jovitsa tasevski eternijan]; born 25 July 1976, Skopje) is a Macedonian poet, essayist and literary critic.

He won The Enchanting Poet Award for excellent contribution in poetry writing, given by The Enchanting Verses Literary Review. His books were shortlisted twice for the most prestigious Macedonian poetry prize Miladinov Brothers and once for Dimitar Mitrev award given by the Macedonian Writers' Association for book of literary criticism and essays.

His poetry is published in a number of anthologies in Macedonia and abroad, it has appeared in many literary magazines and has been translated into several languages.

He is a member of the Editorial Board of the Macedonian literary magazine Stremež and a consultant for Macedonian poetry in The Other Voices International Project, an anthology of world poetry endorsed by UNESCO.

He graduated from the Comparative Literature Department, Faculty of Philology in Skopje.

Works in National and University Library "St. Clement of Ohrid" (Macedonian: "Свети Климент Охридски").

He is a member of the Macedonian Writers' Association, The Poetry Society and of the World Poets Society.

== Books ==
- "Исход" (Outcome; poetry collection). Skopje : Galikul, 2012. 54 p. ISBN 978-608-65215-8-5
- "Syntax of the Light" (selected poems translated into English by Maja Bakračeska; Skopje: St. Clement of Ohrid, National and University Library, 2011. 170 p. ISBN 978-608-232-098-4
- "Синтаксис на светлината" (Syntax of the Light; selected poems translated into Bulgarian by Petar Karaangov; Sofija : B'lgarski pisatel, Skopje : Makavej, 2010. 68 p. ISBN 978-954-443-818-0 and ISBN 978-608-205-063-8
- "Синтакса на светлината" (Syntax of the Light; selected poems, volume 91 in capital project "Macedonian literature"). Bitola : Mikena, 2008. 169 p. ISBN 978-9989-55-147-5
- "Посоки и огледи" (Directions and Reflections; literary criticism, essays and studies). Skopje : Makedonska reč, 2006. 145 p. ISBN 9989-163-25-1
- "Небесни стражи" (Heavenly Guards; poetry collection). Skopje : Makedonska reč, 2004. 56 p. ISBN 9989-2231-2-2
- "Клатно" (Pendulum; poetry collection). Skopje : Tri, 2001. 94 p. ISBN 9989-918-33-3
- "Постојното, плимата" (The Constant, the Tide; literary criticism, essays and studies). Skopje : Makavej, 2000. 168 p.; 20 cm. ISBN 9989-922-04-7
- "Веда" (Lightning; poetry collection). Prilep : Spisanie za literatura, umetnost i kultura "Stremež" : Dom na kultura "Marko Cepenkov", 1998. 44 p. ISBN 9989-811-15-6
- "Визии. Глагол" (Visions. Verb; poetry collection). Skopje : Krajnički, 1997. 73 p. ISBN 9989-808-05-8
- "Нешто се слуша" (Something Can Be Heard; poetry collection). Skopje : Tasevski-Eternijan J., 1995. 59 p.

== Other literary works ==
With Maja Apostoloska he selected and edited an anthology of Macedonian poetry with religious, biblical and apocryphal motifs, published as a special issue of magazine "Stremež". Also he is compiler of anthology of youth Macedonian poetry, entitled "Unidentified Celestial Bosom" (2001).
