= Maja Apostoloska =

Macedonian writer

- Born: 7 December 1976 (age 49)
- Education: B.A. in Comparative Literature from the "Blaže Koneski" Faculty of Philology
- Known for: Macedonian poet, essayist and literary critic
- Notable work: "Именувањето" (Naming; poetry). Skopje: Dom na kultura 'Kočo Racin', 2009.; "Зад текстовите" (Behind the Texts; literary criticism, essays and studies). Skopje: Makedonska reč, 2007.; "Прекин на комуникацијата" (Communication Breakdown; poetry). Skopje: Bata press, 2004.; "Заиграј, веќе, мастилаво!" (Play at Last, Inky!; poetry). Skopje: Zumpres, 2000.

Maja Apostoloska (Macedonian: Маја Апостолоска; born 7 December 1976) is a Macedonian poet, essayist and literary critic. She holds a B.A. in Comparative Literature from the "Blaže Koneski" Faculty of Philology in Skopje, where she is currently attending Macedonian language postgraduate studies. She is an editor of literary magazine "Kniževno žitie".

== Books ==
- "Именувањето" (Naming; poetry). Skopje: Dom na kultura 'Kočo Racin', 2009. 43 p. ISBN 978-9989-2835-1-2
- "Зад текстовите" (Behind the Texts; literary criticism, essays and studies). Skopje: Makedonska reč, 2007. 165 p. ISBN 978-9989-163-44-9
- "Прекин на комуникацијата" (Communication Breakdown; poetry). Skopje: Bata press, 2004. 48 p. ISBN 9989-819-25-4
- "Заиграј, веќе, мастилаво!" (Play at Last, Inky!; poetry). Skopje: Zumpres, 2000. 48 p. ISBN 9989-42-087-4

== Other literary works ==
Together with Jovica Tasevski-Eternijan, she has edited a selection of contemporary Macedonian poetry containing Biblical, religious and apocryphal elements, which was published as a thematic issue of the "Stremež" magazine (No. 11-12, 2000).
