= Katica Kulavkova =

Macedonian writer and academic (born 1951)

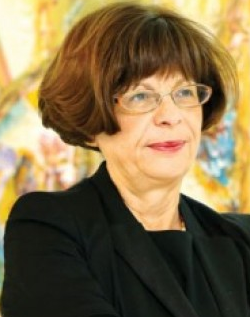
- Born: 1951 (age 74–75); Veles, SFR Yugoslavia
- Other names: Kata Ќulavkova, Катица Ќулавкова
- Occupations: Poet, writer, academic

Katica Kulavkova (Macedonian: Катица Ќулавкова, born 1951) is a Macedonian writer and academic. She has published over forty books, including twenty collections of poetry. Kulavkova is a professor in the philology faculty at the Ss. Cyril and Methodius University of Skopje and a vice president of the literary organization PEN International.

== Biography ==
Katica (Kata) Kulavkova was born in Veles, People's Republic of Macedonia in 1951. She received her B.A. and M.A. from the Sts. Cyril and Methodius University in Skopje and her Ph.D., in 1986, from the University of Zagreb.

Kulavkova's career has focused on Macedonian poetic language. Her first scholarly work was Figurative Speech in Macedonian Poetry, published in 1984. Currently, she is a professor of theory of literature and literary hermeneutics at the University of Skopje.

She previously served as president of the Macedonian chapter of PEN International and has been a member of the Macedonian Writers’ Association since 1978. She has been a member of the Macedonian Academy of Arts and Science since 2003. As of 2019 Kulavkova is also an executive committee member of the International Association for Semiotic Studies.

== Works available in English ==
- Contemporary Macedonian Poetry, ed. Ewsald Osers (Forest, 1991)
- New European Poets, eds. Wayne Miller and Kevin Prufer (Graywolf Press, 2008)
- Interpretations: European Research Project for Poetics & Hermeneutics, eds. Katica Ḱulavkova and Nataša Avramovska (Macedonian Academy of Sciences and Arts, 2009)
- Six Macedonian Poets, ed. Igor Isakovski (Arc Publications, 2011) - bilingual anthology featuring Kulavkova alongside Elizabeta Bakovska, Lidija Dimkovska, Bogomil Gjuzel, Igor Isakovski, and Jovica Ivanovski
