= National and University Library "St. Kliment of Ohrid" =

National and University Library "St. Kliment of Ohrid"-Skopje
- Национална и универзитетска библиотека „Св. Климент Охридски"-Скопје
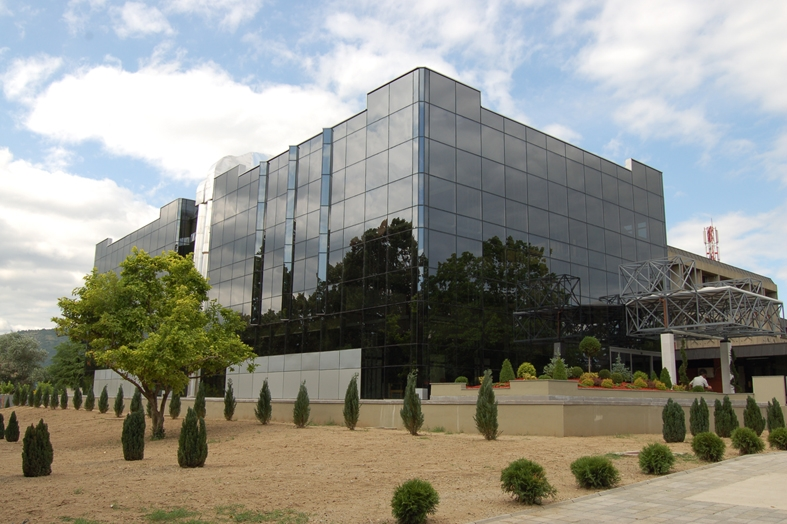
- 41°59′52.6″N 21°26′22.4″E
- Location: 6 Bul. "Goce Delcev" 1000 Skopje, North Macedonia
- Type: National library, Academic library
- Established: 1944 (82 years ago)

Collection
- Items collected: Books, journals, newspapers, magazines, maps, postcards, drawings and manuscripts
- Size: 3 million total items
- Legal deposit: yes

Other information
- Director: Jelisaveta Kostadinova
- Website: nubsk.edu.mk

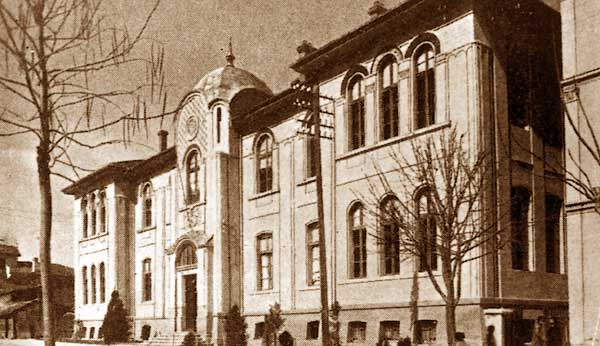
The old building of the Faculty of Philosophy in Skopje, which originally housed the library, was demolished in the 1963 earthquake

The National and University Library "St. Kliment Ohridski" in Skopje is the national library of North Macedonia. It was one of the first institutions established by the decision of the Anti-Fascist Assembly of the National Liberation of Macedonia (ASNOM) on 23 November 1944.

The rich library tradition on the soil of the Republic of North Macedonia, whose roots stretch back to the deeds of pan-Slavonic educators St. Cyril (826–869) and St. Methodius (820–885) is the same foundations on which the library began to build and develop its activity. Its patron, Saint Clement of Ohrid (840–916) established the first monastic library in Ohrid, in the Monastery of St. Panteleimon, and he is considered to be the founder of the librarianship in these parts. Numerous medieval monastic libraries in Macedonia, part of whose collections are in the library today, continued the library tradition on the territory of Macedonia.

The initial collection of the National and University Library "St. Kliment Ohridski" amounts 150,000 library units, mostly university textbooks and scientific publications in the field of humanities and social sciences: literature, ethnology, geography, history, etc., and also, significant titles from the reference literature (encyclopedias, dictionaries, bibliographies) and approximately 300 titles periodicals. In 1945, with the Decision of ASNOM, the NUL began to receive a copy of all items published in Macedonia and also in the former Yugoslavia. In this way it became the deposit library of the former People's Republic of Macedonia and one of the eight Yugoslav depository libraries. Since 1991, after the independence of the Republic of North Macedonia, the library has become a depository for the publishing production of North Macedonia.

The flood in 1962 and 1963 Skopje earthquake, violently and cruelly interrupted the library's development. The library building was almost completely destroyed, and the collection, which at that time numbered about 500,000 units, was badly damaged. In early 1964, the collection was moved and housed in a custom-built prefabricated building where the library functioned until it moved into the new and modern building in 1972.

== Collections ==
Following departments were established:

- Bibliographic Center (1949) as a unit responsible for producing the Macedonian National Bibliography,
- The Library Headquarters and Librarianship Development (1954),
- Microfilm laboratory (1966);
- The Laboratory for Conservation and Restoration (1970).
- Referral Center (1976), which later on launched initial activities related to the automation of library processes.

=== Special collections ===
Special collections were established gradually. They include: Old printed material and rare books, Old Slavonic Manuscripts, Oriental Manuscripts, Fine Arts, Cartographic Materials, Music, Archival, Doctoral and Masters’ Theses etc.

Apart from its basic function as a national and central library headquarters of the Republic of Macedonia, with the foundation of Ss. Cyril and Methodius University of Skopje, the library receives the university function as well, sanctioned by the Law for Libraries from 1960.

== Library Information System ==
In 1987 the National Library, being responsible for the development of unique library and information system which has to connect all types of libraries in country, participated in the establishment of library and information system and the system of scientific and technological information of Yugoslavia, created by the Institute of Information Sciences (IZUM) from Maribor, (Slovenia).

The National Library started to apply the COBISS system in 1996. By connecting these libraries in 2001, COBISS.MK, the shared cataloging system was established, which on 3 December 2004 was officially promoted as a national library-information system. Then, the National Library and IZUM signed the agreement for implementation of COBISS.MK system in the Republic of Macedonia when the Virtual Library Center of Macedonia (VLM Center) was founded and took over the tasks of a national library-information service of this system.

In 2003, the National Library, on behalf of all libraries in Macedonia, signed the Agreement for establishing the network COBISS.Net, by which the national library-information system COBISS.MK was connected with the other library-information systems COBISS in the region, in the library network that ensures free flow and exchange of information among the libraries. Today, through COBISS.Net, the VLM Center provides connection and cooperation with more than 700 participating libraries in the COBISS systems of Slovenia, Serbia, Monte Negro, Bosnia and Herzegovina, Bulgaria and Albania.

== Memberships ==
The international cooperation of the National and University Library is very active and rich. The library is a member of several international associations and bodies among which are: IFLA, CENL, LIBER, EBLIDA, ISSN, ISBN, ISMN. In line with this, the National center for ISSN and National Agency for ISBN, International Agency for ISMN as well the centre for international landing of library materials and E-CRIS – center that compiles and updates data on research organisations, research projects and scholars in the Republic of Macedonia, function within the library. The library is a partner in The European Library and The World Digital Library. In addition, the National Library houses the German Reading Room, a Confucius Institute as well as a Russian Reading Room, EU Info point and from very recently the American Corner.

At the beginning of 2008 the foundation stone of new and modern building as an extension of the current one was laid by which the library has received additional 3000 m2. The new building houses the Special collections, Virtual Library of Macedonia and Digitization Center. The new building was officially opened on 24 May 2009.

== Awards ==
For contributing to the scientific, cultural and overall social development of Macedonia, the library has received following awards and recognitions: the Order of Merit for people with a silver (1972); Award "October 11" as the highest social recognition for significant achievements in the field of science in SRM (1975); cultural Charter (1984); "Kliment Ohridski" Award (1984 and 1994).
