= Anton Panov =

Macedonian writer

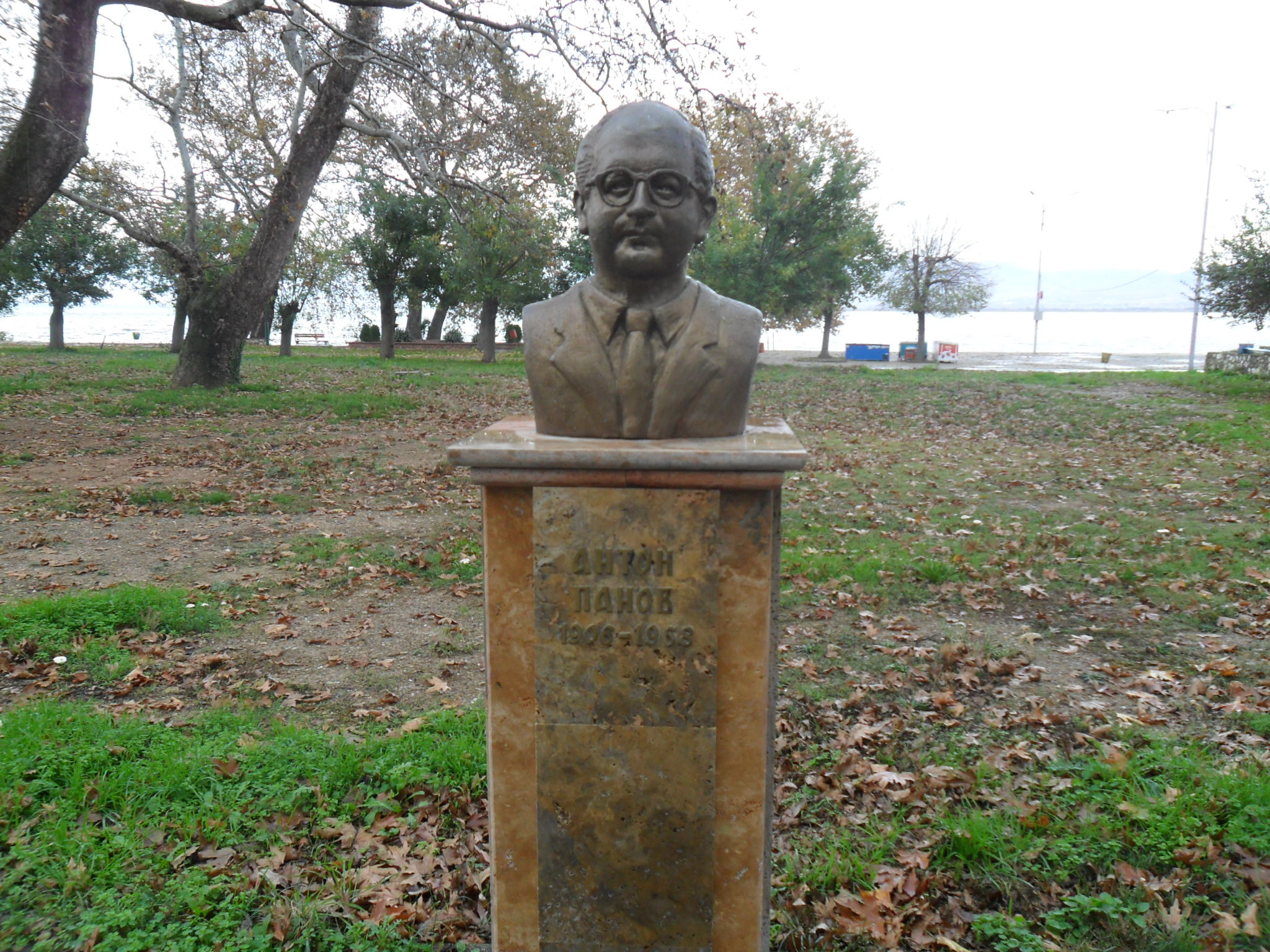
Bust of Anton Panov in Dojran

Anton Panov (Macedonian: Антон Панов, pronounced [a'ntɔn pa'nɔf]; 1906 in Dojran – 1968 in Strumica) was a Macedonian writer. He wrote several plays in Macedonian in the period between the two world wars. His most important play is Pecalbari, played in the theatres in Skopje, Belgrade, Niš and others.
