= Mateja Matevski =

Macedonian poet (1929–2018)

- Матеја Матевски
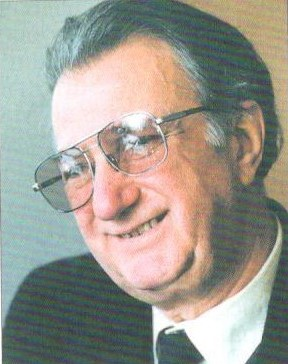
- Born: 13 March 1929; Istanbul, Turkey
- Died: 6 June 2018 (aged 89); Skopje, Macedonia
- Occupation: Poet

Mateja Matevski (Macedonian: Матеја Матевски; 13 March 1929 – 6 June 2018) was a Macedonian poet, literary and theater critic, essayist, and translator.

== Career ==
Matevski was born on 13 March 1929 in Istanbul, Turkey to an Albanian family of the Eastern Orthodox rite. His family resided temporarily in Turkey for work. Matevski graduated from the Faculty of Philology in Skopje. He worked as a journalist for Macedonian Radio and Television, editor of the cultural and literary programme, editor-in-chief and director of the Television as well as Director General of the Radio Television Skopje. He also held the function of president of the commission for cultural relations abroad and was a member of the presidency of SR Macedonia. He was an editor for the publishing house "Koco Racin". He served as professor of history of world drama and a professor at the Faculty of Dramatic Arts in Skopje.

Matevski has been the editor of the literary journals "Mlada literatura" Association. He has also been the president of the council of the Struga Poetry Evenings Festival, "Racinovi sredbi". He is a corresponding member of the North-American Academy in the Spanish language. Matevski is a member of the Bjornstjerne Bjornson Academy in Molde, Norway.

Mateja Matevski is a central figure in the second generation of Macedonian poet-intellectuals who came to maturity with their nation in the 1950s and shaped the main directions of its contemporary literature. The founding generation of Macedonian poets who came before them—that of Blaze Koneski and Aco Sopov—had fought the battles for modernism beside their Serbian colleagues and against the Zdanovite realists of the early socialist days. Now a second generation, university poets educated after the war, brought a new complexity, an informed literacy, and a heightened symbolic complexity to that literature. Poets such as Radovan Pavlovski shaped Macedonian natural imagery to new surrealistic power; Gane Todorovski and Vlada Urosevic brought contemporary and urban subjects into the poetry, but it would be Bogomil Gjuzel and especially Matevski who would bring that poetry to a new formal and referential awareness, a sense of form, and a consciousness in composition perhaps necessary to gain for it the high regard that it now enjoys in the world.

Thirty books of his poetry have been published in twenty foreign languages. He has published over forty books of translations from Spanish, French, Macedonian, Slovenian, Russian, Albanian, Portuguese and Serbian.

Matevski died on 6 June 2018 in Skopje, Macedonia, aged 89. His funeral was held at the Butel City Cemetery in Skopje.

== Selected works ==
- Rains (poetry, 1956)
- The Equinox (poetry, 1963)
- Irises (poetry, 1976)
- The Circle (poetry, 1977)
- Lime Tree (poetry, 1980)
- The birth of Tragedy (poetry, 1985)
- From Tradition to the Future (criticism and essays, 1987)
- Drama and Theatre (theatre criticism and essays, 1987)
- Moving Away (poetry, 1990)
- Black tower (poetry, 1992)
- Carry away (poetry, 1996)
- The Light of the Word (criticism and essays)
- The Dead One (poetry, 1999)
- Inner area (poetry, 2000)

== Awards ==
- Macedonian Writers' Association Award, "Miladinov Brothers", "11th October", "Grigor Prlicev", "Koco Racin"
- Book of the Year from the Macedonian literary foundation, "Praznik na lipite", "Kliment Ohridski", *The great award "Makedonsko slovo", "Kiril Pejcinovic",
- "Goranov Venec" (Lukovdol, Croatia)
- "Blez Sandrar" (Iverdon, Switzerland),
- "Premio Mediterraneo " – special award (Palermo, Italy)
- "Fernando Rielo" – world award for mystical poetry – for the book "The Black Tower" (Madrid, Spain),
- "Zupanciceva listina" – Slovenian Writers' Association (Ljubljana, Slovenia)
- "Atlantida" (Las Palmas, Spain)
- Holder of the French Legion of Honour, Arts and Literature.
- "Jan Smrek Prize" – awarded for his lifelong poetical work (Slovakia, 2010)
- "Golden Wreath of the Struga Poetry Evenings" (Struga, Macedonia, 2011)
