= Skopje Book Fair =

Annual event in Skopje, North Macedonia

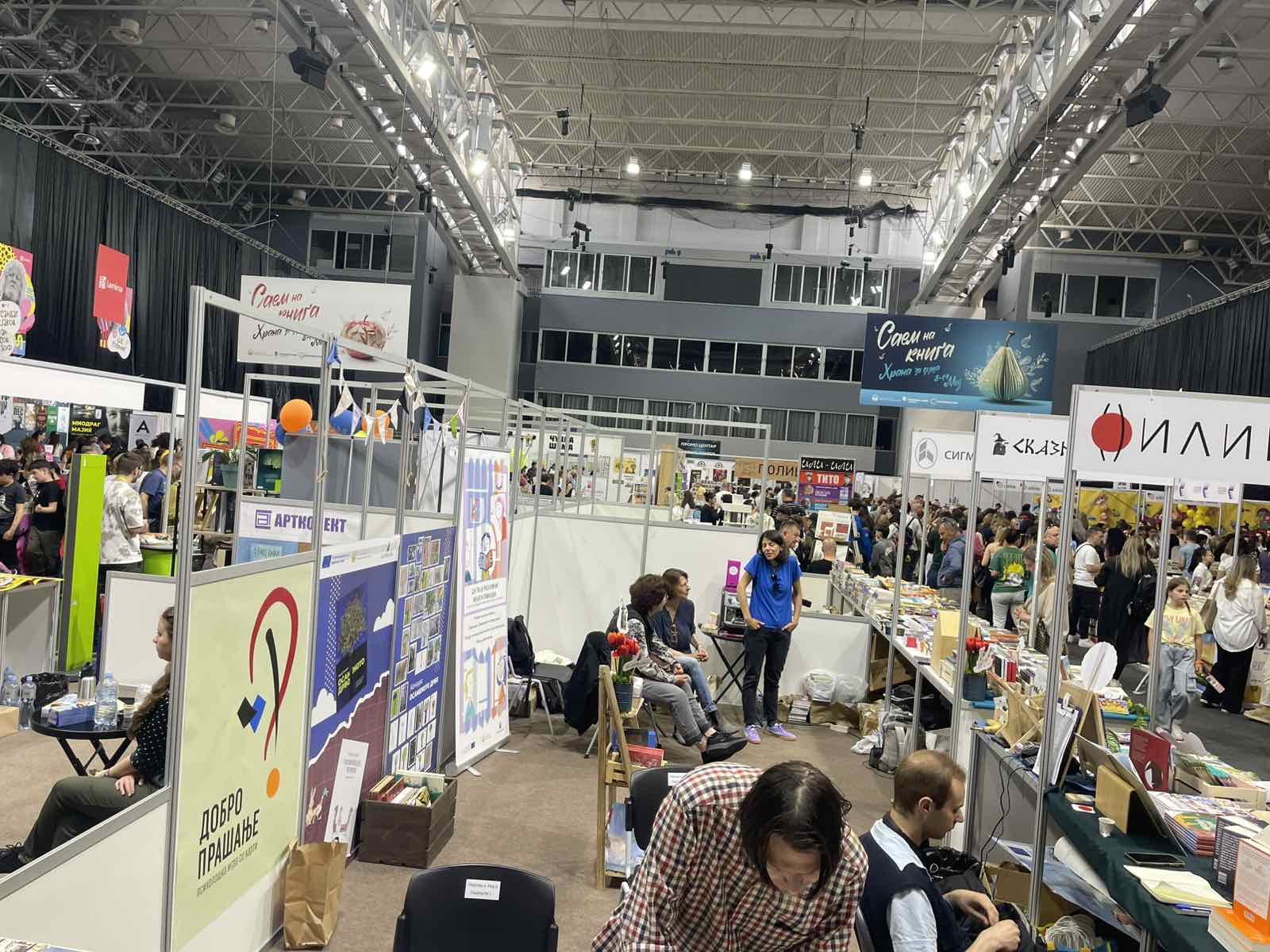
- Skopje Book Fair exhibition hall in 2025
- Status: Active
- Genre: Multi-genre
- Frequency: Annual, May
- Venue: Boris Trajkovski Sports Center
- Location: Skopje
- Country: North Macedonia
- Inaugurated: 1988; 38 years ago
- Attendance: (2025)

The Skopje Book Fair is a cultural event held annually in Skopje, the capital city of North Macedonia. The event typically takes place in the spring, usually around April or May, and spans several days. It is one of the most significant literary events in the region, attracting a diverse array of publishers, authors, and book lovers from North Macedonia and beyond. Overall, the Skopje Book Fair is a recognition of literature and culture, reflecting the literary diversity of North Macedonia.

== Overview ==
The fair hosts a diverse range of exhibitors, including both local and international publishers, bookstores, and educational institutions. These exhibitors showcase and sell books across various genres and languages. Many authors take advantage of the fair to launch their new books, with book signings and meet-and-greet sessions providing opportunities for readers to interact with writers.

A program of literary events typically accompanies the fair, featuring panel discussions, workshops, lectures, and readings on a variety of literary topics. Notable literary figures and scholars often participate in these events. Additionally, there is a dedicated section for children that offers storytelling sessions, interactive workshops, and performances to encourage reading among young audiences.

Cultural events often complement the main activities of the book fair, including music performances, theatrical productions, and art exhibitions. The fair also serves as a networking platform for industry professionals, such as publishers, authors, translators, and literary agents, promoting collaborations and business opportunities.

== See also ==
- North Macedonia
- Prishtina Book Fair
