= Bogomil Gjuzel =

Macedonian poet, writer, and playwright (1939–2021)

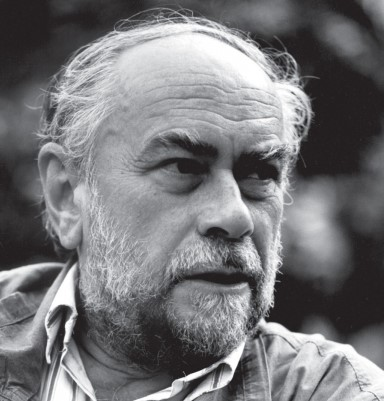
Bogomil Gjuzel

Bogomil Gjuzel (Macedonian: Богомил Ѓузел; Bulgarian: Богомил Гюзел [boɡoˈmiɫ ɟoˈzɛɫ]; Serbian: Богомил Ђузел; 9 February 1939 – 22 April 2021) was a Macedonian poet, writer, playwright and translator.

== Biography ==
Born in 1939 in Čačak, Kingdom of Yugoslavia to Bulgarian parents, Gjuzel was the son of the Bulgarian revolutionary and philosopher Dimitar Gyuzelov. His mother, Donka Ivanova, was one of the founders of the Secret Cultural and Educational Organization of Macedonian Bulgarian Women. He graduated from the Department of English at the University of Skopje (SFR Yugoslavia), in 1963, and spent an academic year at the University of Edinburgh as a British Council scholar, 1964/65. He died in 2021, aged 82.

== Work ==
Gjuzel was a dramaturge with the Dramski Theater in Skopje for two terms, 1966-1971 and 1985–1998. He participated in the International Writing Program at the University of Iowa in 1972–1973, and in the poetry festivals in Rotterdam (1978 & 1996), San Francisco (1980), Herleen (1991), Maastricht and Valencia (2000). He was one of the ten founders of the Independent Writers of Macedonia association and its first chairman in 1994, and since 1995 editor-in-chief of its bi-monthly journal Naše Pismo. Since 1999 he was an acting director of the Struga Poetry Evenings.

Gjuzel was the first editor of Shine Poetry.

Lech Miodinsky wrote and published a Ph.D. dissertation on his poetry: Bogomil Guzel, Poeticky dialogz natura i kultura, Katowice 1994, in Polish, translated and published in Macedonian in 1999.

== Bibliography ==
=== Poetry ===
- Mead (1962 & 1971)
- Alchemical Rose (1963)
- Libation Bearers (1966), awarded with the Brothers Miladinov Prize for the best book of the year
- Odysseus in Hell (a selection, 1969)
- A Well in Time (1972), Brothers Miladinov Award
- The Wheel of the Year (1977)
- Reality is All (1980)
- State of Siege (1981)
- Empty Space (1982)
- Darkness and Milk (1986), and in Serbo-Croatian in 1987 awarded the Aleksa Šantic Yugoslav Award for 1985-88
- Destroying the Wall (1989)
- Selected Poems (1991)
- Naked Life (1994)
- Chaos (1998)
- She/It (a long poem, 2000)
- Selected Poetry (1962-2002) (2002).
- Selections in Serbo-Croatian: Sky, Earth and Sun (1963), Mead (1972), bilingual Poems (1981).
- Selection in Slovenian: The Fish of Sense (1985).
- Selections in English: Three (1972), The Wreckage Reconsidered (Chattanooga Chapbooks, Tennessee, 1997), The Wolf at the Door (Xenos Books, California, USA, 2001). Included in all the anthologies of Macedonian and Yugoslav poetry since 1963.

=== Prose ===
- History as Stepmother (essays, 1969)
- The Whole World is a House (travelogues from Ireland and USA, 1975)
- Mytho-Stories (three plays, 1982)
- Legends (stories, 1984)
- A Bundle (essays - in preparation). With Ljubiša Geiorgievski
- Black (a tragic farce, 1989).

=== Translations ===
- Shakespeare's Macbeth (1969)
- King Lear (1972)
- Hamlet (1980)
- Julius Caesar (1981)
- A Midsummer Night's Dream (1984)
- Twelfth Night (1985)
- Troilus and Cressida (1992)
- The Tempest (1992)
- Titus Andronicus (1994).
- Bond's Saved
- O'Neil's Long Day’s Journey Into Night
- Sheppard's Buried Child
- Pinter's Lover
- Selected poetry by: T. S. Eliot, W. H. Auden, Charles Simic (1984)
- Emily Dickinson (1986)
- Seamus Heaney (2001)
- Contemporary American Poetry, 1978 (translator and co-editor), with second and revised edition in 1999.
