= United Macedonia =

Irredentist concept among Macedonian nationalists

A map distributed by Macedonian nationalists c. 1993. It shows the geographical region of Macedonia split with barbed wire between the then-Republic of Macedonia, Bulgaria and Greece.

United Macedonia (Macedonian: Обединета Македонија, romanized: Obedineta Makedonija), or Greater Macedonia (Macedonian: Голема Македонија, romanized: Golema Makedonija), is an irredentist concept among Macedonian nationalists that aims to unify the transnational region of Macedonia in Southeastern Europe (which they claim as their homeland and which they assert was unjustly divided under the Treaty of Bucharest in 1913) into a single state that would be dominated by ethnic Macedonians. The proposed capital of such a United Macedonia is the city of Thessaloniki (Solun in the Slavic languages), Greece's second largest city.

== History ==
The roots of the concept can be traced back to the 1910 First Balkan Socialist Conference as a possible solution of the Macedonian Question. The Macedonian Scientific and Literary Society sought for the creation of an independent Macedonia, encompassing the entire geographic region of Macedonia, according to maps drawn by the society itself. In 1913 they send a memorandum of independence of Macedonia to the Great Powers and another to the countries of the Balkan League.

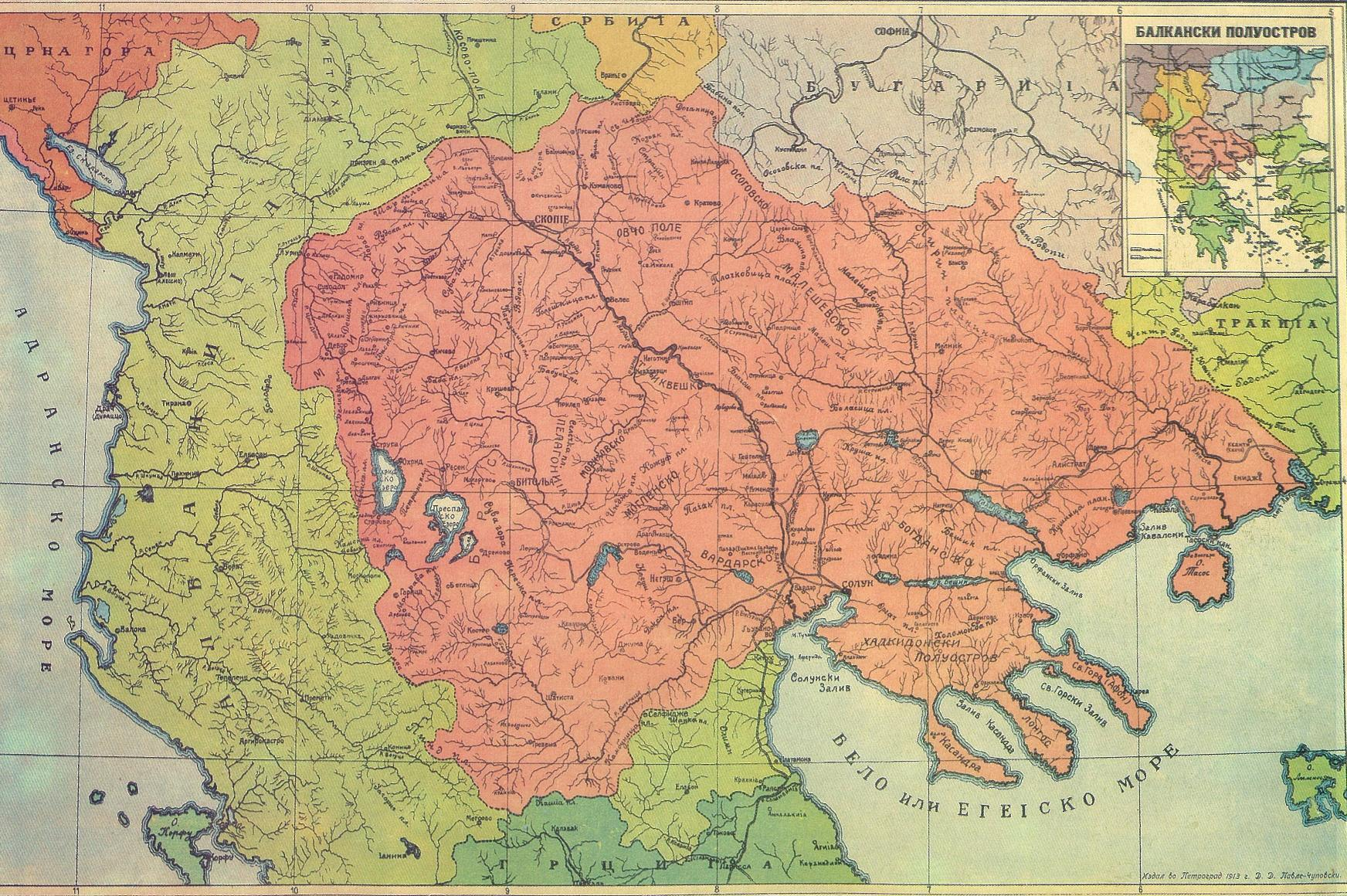
Map of Macedonia drawn by Dimitrija Čupovski in 1913, published in the newspaper Македонскій Голосъ, issued by the Macedonian Scientific and Literary Society.

Georgi Dimitrov, a Bulgarian communist politician, wrote in 1915 that the creation of a "Macedonia, which was split into three parts, was to be reunited into a single state enjoying equal rights within the framework of the Balkan Democratic Federation". In November 1918, the members of the left wing of the former Internal Macedonian Revolutionary Organization (IMRO), particularly the Serres group issued a declaration in which they called for the restoration of Macedonia to its original geographical boundaries as the basis of a future Balkan Federation. On the principles of the declaration in 1919 the Temporary representation of the former United Internal Revolutionary Organization was created, which issued an Appeal in March 1919 and send it to the Great Powers on the Paris Peace Conference. In 1921 the Macedonian Federative Organization (MFO) was created, its goal was the creation of an independent Macedonia within its geographical and economic borders, with intention of joining a future Balkan Federation. In 1924, MFO alongside the IMRO, the Bulgarian Communist Party and the Comintern created the May Manifesto. The manifesto called for a liberation and reunion of the separated parts of Macedonia in a fully autonomous and independent political unit within its natural geographic and ethnic frontiers. In 1924, the Communist International suggested that all Balkan communist parties adopt a platform of a "united Macedonia" but the suggestion was rejected by the Bulgarian and Greek communists. On the basis of the May Manifesto in October 1925 the IMRO (United) was created. In 1934 the Comintern in coordination with IMRO (United) issued an official political document, in which for the first time, an authoritative international organization recognized the existence of a separate Macedonian nation and a Macedonian language.

After the beginning of World War II in Yugoslav Macedonia the Macedonian communists fell under the influence of the Bulgarian Communist Party (BCP), which supported the idea of an independent unified Macedonia. In 1943, Svetozar Vukmanović was sent by Tito to eliminate the influence of the BCP over the local communists and form within the Yugoslav Party, a Macedonian party which will be pro-Yugoslavism. As a result, the BCP influenced Regional Committee of Communists in Macedonia was dissolved and replaced by a new Communist Party of Macedonia, as part of the Yugoslav Communist Party. However, the Yugoslav communists soon realized that in order to accumulate the resistance and attract Macedonian nationalists they had to proclaim as their aim the unification of Macedonia's three regions (Yugoslav, Greek and Bulgarian), within Yugoslavia as extension of its prewar territory. According to Vukmanović, the slogan about a united Macedonia appeared in the manifesto of the HQ of the National Liberation Army of Macedonia, at the beginning of October 1943. Also, the Yugoslav communists recognized the separate Macedonian nationality to reduce the fears of the Macedonian Slavic population that they would continue the former Yugoslav policy of forced Serbianization. They did not support the view that the Macedonian Slavs are Bulgarians, because that meant in practice, the area should remain part of Bulgaria after the war. During the following operations of the National Liberation War of Macedonia the Macedonian Communist combatants further developed aspirations over the geographic region of Macedonia that continued after 1944 during the Greek Civil War.

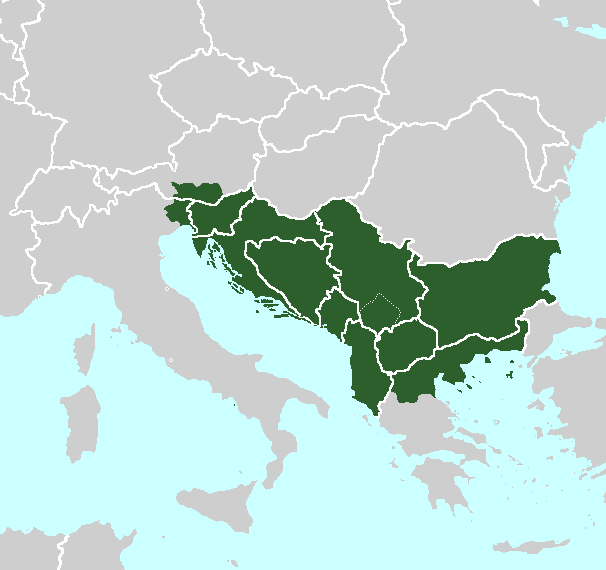
Greater Yugoslavia with united Macedonia as part of it.

The Bled agreement (1947) signed by the communist leaders Georgi Dimitrov and Josip Broz Tito also foresaw the unification of Yugoslav and Bulgarian Macedonia. It was also the first time that Bulgaria recognized ethnic Macedonians and the Macedonian language. After the Tito–Stalin split in 1948 and the death of Dimitrov in 1949, in the same year, the communists lost the Civil War in Greece. That put to an end the practical application of the concept.

== After the breakup of Yugoslavia ==
Flag of the then-Republic of Macedonia from 1992 to 1995, commonly used by revanchists and nationalists seeking unification with Bulgarian (Pirin) Macedonia and Greek (Aegean) Macedonia

Since 1989, Macedonian nationalists have called for a "United Macedonia", stating that "Solun (Thessaloniki) is ours" and "We fight for a United Macedonia". Several maps depicting "United Macedonia" as an independent country, stating irredentist claims of the Macedonian nationalists against both Greek and Bulgarian territory, circulated since the late 1980s and the beginning of the 1990s. In one of those maps all of Mount Olympus was incorporated in the territory of "United Macedonia". The Macedonian nationalists break down the region of Macedonia as follows:

- Vardar Macedonia (Вардарска Македонија) which includes:
  - the territory of North Macedonia;
  - Gora (Гора), small portions of southern Kosovo and eastern Albania
  - Prohor Pčinski (Прохор Пчински), southern Serbia; and
- Greek Macedonia (or "Aegean Macedonia", "Егејска Македонија"), northern Greece;
- Blagoevgrad Province (or "Pirin Macedonia", "Пиринска Македонија"), southwestern Bulgaria; and
- Mala Prespa and Golo Brdo (Мала Преспа и Голо Брдо), Albania.

Macedonian nationalists describe the above areas as the unliberated parts of North Macedonia and they claim that the majority of the population in those territories are oppressed ethnic Macedonians. In the cases of Bulgaria and Albania, it is said that they are undercounted in the censuses (In Albania, there are officially 5,000 ethnic Macedonians, whereas Macedonian nationalists claim the figures are more like 120,000-350,000. In Bulgaria, there are officially 1,600 ethnic Macedonians, whereas Macedonian nationalists claim 200,000). In Greece, there is a Slavic-speaking minority with various self-identifications (Macedonian, Greek, Bulgarian), estimated by Ethnologue and the Greek Helsinki Monitor as being between 100,000 and 200,000 (according to the Greek Helsinki Monitor only an estimated 10,000-30,000 have an ethnic Macedonian national identity). The government of Macedonia, led by nationalist party VMRO-DPMNE, claimed that there is an ethnic Macedonian minority numbering up to 750,000 in Bulgaria and 700,000 in Greece.

In its first resolution, VMRO-DPMNE, the nationalistic governing party at the time of the then-Republic of Macedonia, adopted the platform of a "United Macedonia", an act that has annoyed moderate Macedonian politicians and has also been regarded by Greece as an intolerable irredentist claim against Greek Macedonia.

During VMRO-DPMNE's rule, the United Macedonia concept was present in official sources in current North Macedonia, and was taught in schools through school textbooks and through other governmental publications.

The Prespa agreement, signed in 2018, in Article 3 mentions that Greece and North Macedonia "confirm their common existing frontier as an enduring and inviolable international border. Neither Party shall assert or support any claims to any part of the territory of the other Party or claims for a change to their common existing frontier."

== See also ==
- Autonomy for Macedonia and Adrianople regions
- Independent Macedonia (IMRO)
- Independent Macedonia (1944)
- Macedonia naming dispute
- Macedonia (terminology)
- Demographic history of Macedonia
- History of North Macedonia
- Bulgarian irredentism
