= Macedonian nationalism =

Social movement of ethnic Macedonians

Flag of North Macedonia.

Macedonian nationalism (Macedonian: македонски национализам, pronounced [makɛdonski nat͡sionalizam]), sometimes referred to as Macedonianism and Macedonism, is a general grouping of nationalist ideas and concepts among ethnic Macedonians that were first formed in the second half of the 19th century among separatists seeking the autonomy of the region of Macedonia from the Ottoman Empire. The movement began as a cultural reaction against Greek, Turkish, and Patriarchist influences, and was fueled by the broader political and social changes within the Ottoman Empire. Over time, it grew into a rejection of Bulgarian, Greek, and Serbian nationalist campaigns to assimilate Macedonia, ultimately culminating during World War II with the proclamation of the Socialist Republic of Macedonia within the Socialist Federal Republic of Yugoslavia, when the separate Macedonian nation gained formal recognition. Macedonian historiography has since established links between the ethnic Macedonians and various historical events and individual figures that occurred in and originated from Macedonia, which range from the Middle Ages up to the 20th century. Following the independence of the Republic of Macedonia in the late 20th century, the country's neighbours have disputed the existence of the Macedonian national identity. Extreme forms of Macedonian nationalism arose, which hold beliefs such as an unbroken continuity between ancient Macedonians and modern ethnic Macedonians, as well as advocating the irredentist concept of a United Macedonia, which involves large portions of Greece and Bulgaria, alongside smaller portions of Albania, Kosovo and Serbia.

== Terminology ==
During the first half of the second millennium, the concept of Macedonia on the Balkans was associated by the Byzantines with their Macedonian province, centered around Adrianople in modern-day Turkey. After the conquest of the Balkans by the Ottomans in the late 14th and early 15th century, the Greek name Macedonia disappeared as a geographical designation for several centuries. The central and northern areas of modern Macedonia were often called "Bulgaria" or "Lower Moesia" during Ottoman rule. The name "Macedonia" was rediscovered during the Renaissance by western researchers, who introduced ancient Greek geographical names in their work, although used in a rather loose manner. After the Greek War of Independence, these names were gradually replaced by "Macedonia". The name gained popularity parallel to the ascendance of rival nationalism in the Ottoman Empire. The background of the modern designation Macedonian can be found in the 19th century, as well as the myth of "ancient Macedonian descent" among the Orthodox Slavs in the area, adopted mainly due to Greek cultural inputs. However, Greek education was not the only engine for such ideas. During the early modern era, some Dalmatian pan-Slavic ideologists like Mavro Orbini believed the ancient Macedonians were Slavs. Under these influences in the 19th century some intellectuals in the region developed the idea on direct link between the local Slavs, the early Slavs and the ancient Balkan populations.

The Slavs in Rumelia self-identified as "Bulgarian" on account of their language and socioeconomic status, thus the word Bulgarian had the connotation of poor, Slav-speaking peasant. Also, the local Slavs considered themselves as "Rum", i.e. members of the community of Orthodox Christians. This community was a source of identity for all the ethnic groups inside it and most people identified mostly with it. At that time, the Orthodox Christian community began to degrade with the continuous identification of the religious creed with ethnic identity, while Bulgarian national activists started a debate on the establishment of their separate Orthodox church. Until the middle of the 19th century, the Greeks also called the Slavs in Macedonia "Bulgarians", and regarded them predominantly as Orthodox brethren, but the rise of Bulgarian nationalism changed the Greek position. As a result, massive Greek religious and school propaganda occurred, and a process of Hellenization was implemented among the Slavic-speaking population of the area. The very name Macedonia, revived during the early 19th century after the foundation of the modern Greek state, with its Western Europe-derived obsession with Ancient Greece, was applied to the local Slavs, which led to some "Macedonization" among Slavic-speaking population of the area. In 1845, the Alexander Romance was published in the Slavic Macedonian dialect typed with Greek letters. At the same time, the Russian ethnographer Victor Grigorovich described a recent change in the title of the Greek Patriarchist bishop of Bitola: from Exarch of all Bulgaria to Exarch of all Macedonia. He also noted the unusual popularity of Alexander the Great and that it appeared to be something that was recently instilled on the local Slavs. Macedonian Slavic intellectuals, such as Konstantin Miladinov, continued to call their land Western Bulgaria and worried that use of the new Macedonian name would imply identification with the Greek nation.

Since the 1850s, some Slavic intellectuals from the area adopted the designation Macedonian as a regional label, and it began to gain popularity. According to Kuzman Shapkarev in 1888, as a result of outsiders' activity, the Slavs in Macedonia had started to use the ancient designation Macedonians alongside the traditional one Bulgarians by the 1870s. However, Shapkarev wrote that the name "Macedonians" had been "imposed on them by outsiders", and that the Slavs in Macedonia were using the designation "Bulgarians" as peculiarly theirs. The term "Slav Macedonian" was widely popularized by the Greeks since the 1890s to draw a distinction from the Bulgarian church, nation and state, as well as to bring Slavs closer to the Greeks through a connection with the ancient Macedonians. By the end of the 19th century, according to Vasil Kanchov, the local Bulgarians called themselves Macedonians, and the surrounding nations called them Macedonians. Per historian Alexander Maxwell, national sentiments existed mostly among the intelligentsia, while the peasantry was not involved in national debates as they were meaningless to their concern, at the end of the 19th century. In the early 20th century, Pavel Shatev witnessed this process of slow differentiation, describing people who insisted on their Bulgarian nationality, but felt themselves Macedonians above all.

During the interwar period, in the Kingdom of Yugoslavia ruled Vardar Macedonia, in the context of the Serbianization policy of the local Slavs, the name Macedonia was scorned, and the name South Serbia was imposed, while some also used simply South or Povardarie (after the Vardar river) as neutral names. According to academic Duncan M. Perry, the name change to Yugoslavia in 1929 by king Alexander was done intentionally to subvert Macedonian consciousness and to foster a common Yugoslav identity. In the 1920s, Serbian army officer Panta Radosavljević argued that the locals identifying as Macedonians were a result of Bulgarian propaganda and manipulation in his attempt to demonstrate the Serbian character of Vardar Macedonia. Ultimately, the designation Macedonian changed its status in 1944, and went from being predominantly a regional, ethnographic denomination, to a national one. When the anthropologist Keith Brown visited the Republic of Macedonia (now North Macedonia) at the eve of the 21st century, he discovered that the local Aromanians, who also call themselves Macedonians, still label the ethnic Macedonians, and their eastern neighbors as "Bulgarians".

The term "Macedonism" was first used in a derogatory manner by Petko Slaveykov in 1871, when he dismissed Macedonian nationalists as "Macedonists". The term is used in Bulgaria in a derogatory manner, to discredit the existence of the Macedonian national identity. For Bulgarian historians, Macedonism is widely seen as a Greater Serbian aspiration, aiming to split the Bulgarian people on anti-Bulgarian grounds. If someone identifies as Macedonian, this is because a Serbian chauvinist strategy has manipulated them in the past. Thus the Macedonian nation is explicitly rejected as a denationalizing product of Serbian propaganda.

== History ==
=== Late 19th century and early 20th century ===
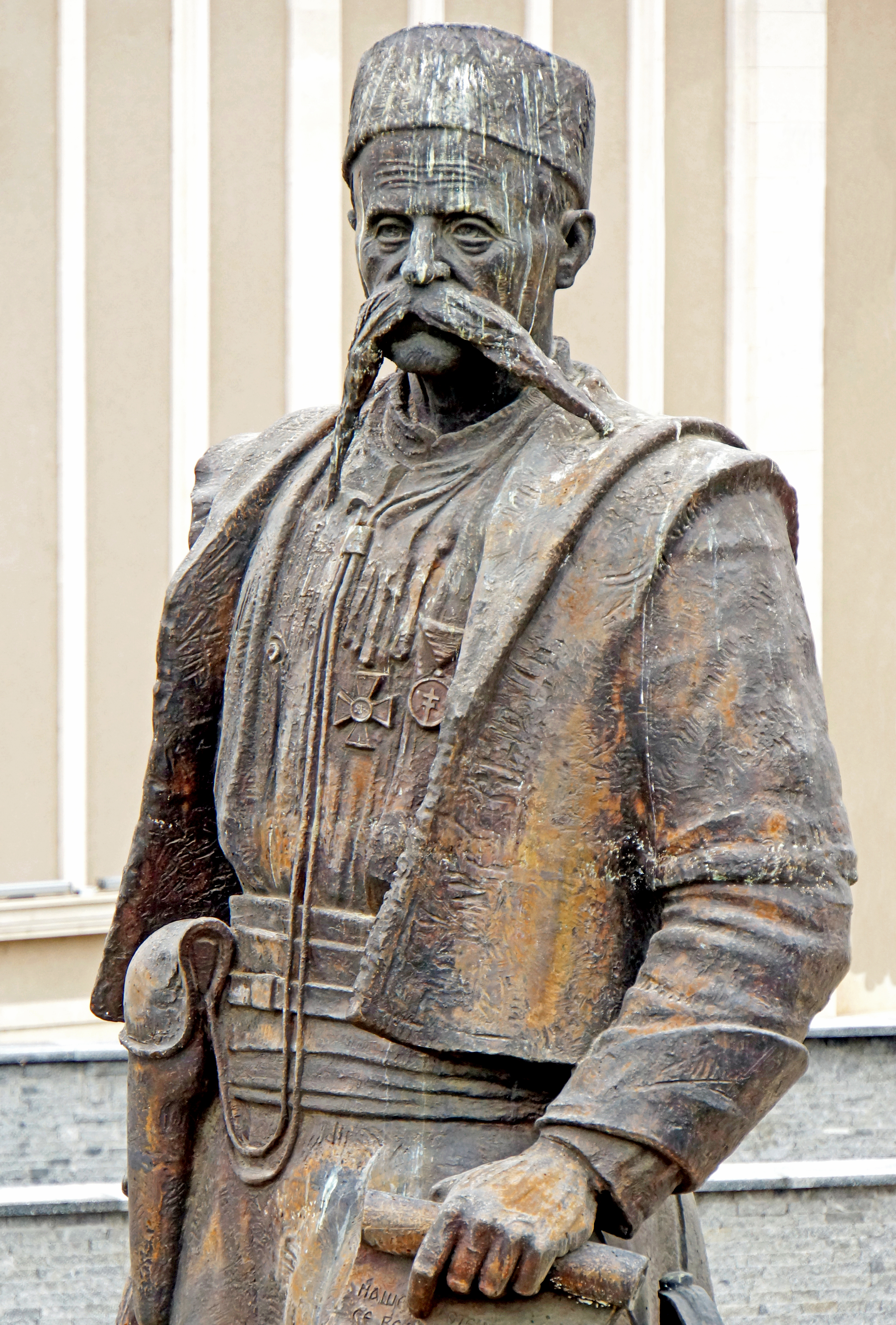
Statue of Gjorgjija Pulevski, a figure of the movement who endorsed the concept of an ethnic Macedonian identity.

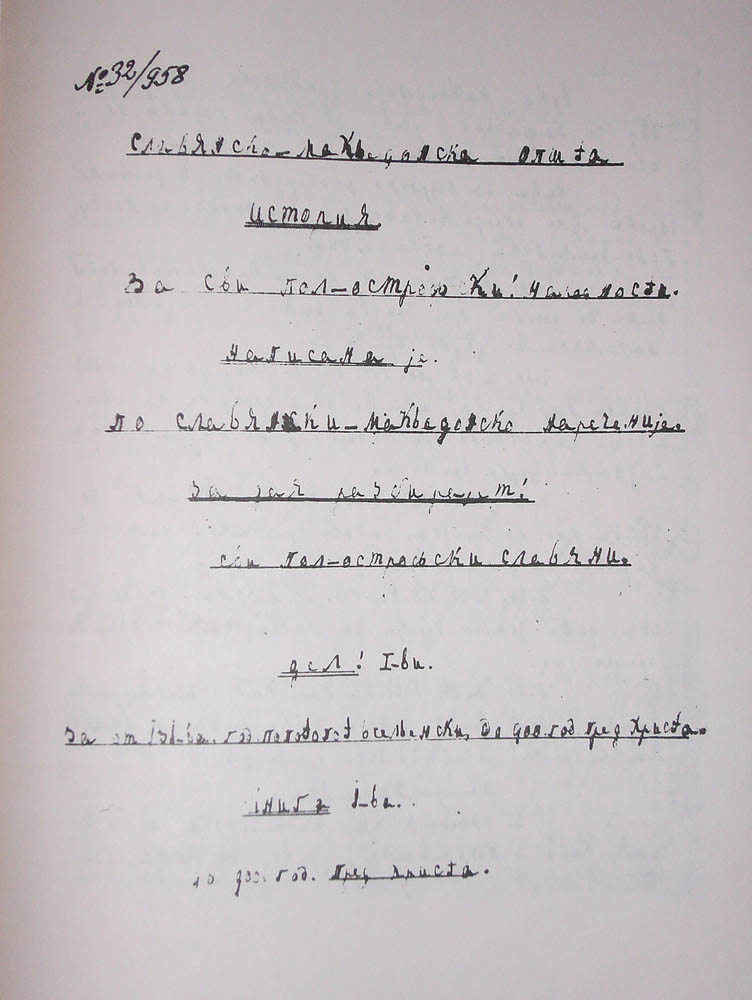
Cover of the "General History of the Macedonian Slavs", largely completed by 1893 in Sofia by Gjorgjija Pulevski. Its author claimed the ancient inhabitants of Macedonia were not Hellenic but Slav-Macedonian.

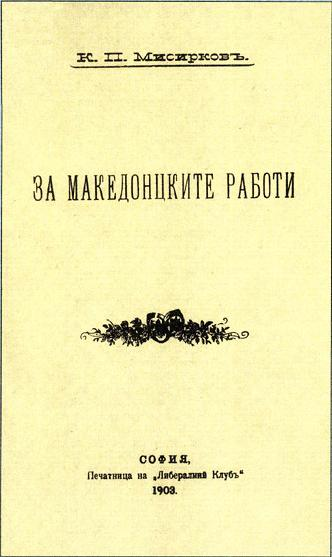
The front page of the book On Macedonian Matters, published in Sofia in 1903 by Krste Petkov Misirkov.

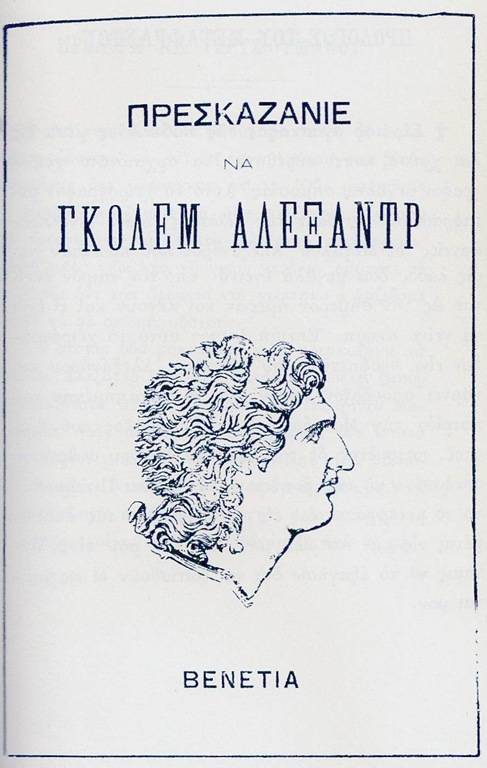
The Prophecy of Alexander the Great (1907) translated into Slavic Macedonian by the Greek nationalist Athanasios Souliotis (Megali Idea advocates) in 1907 and issued in Thessaloniki.

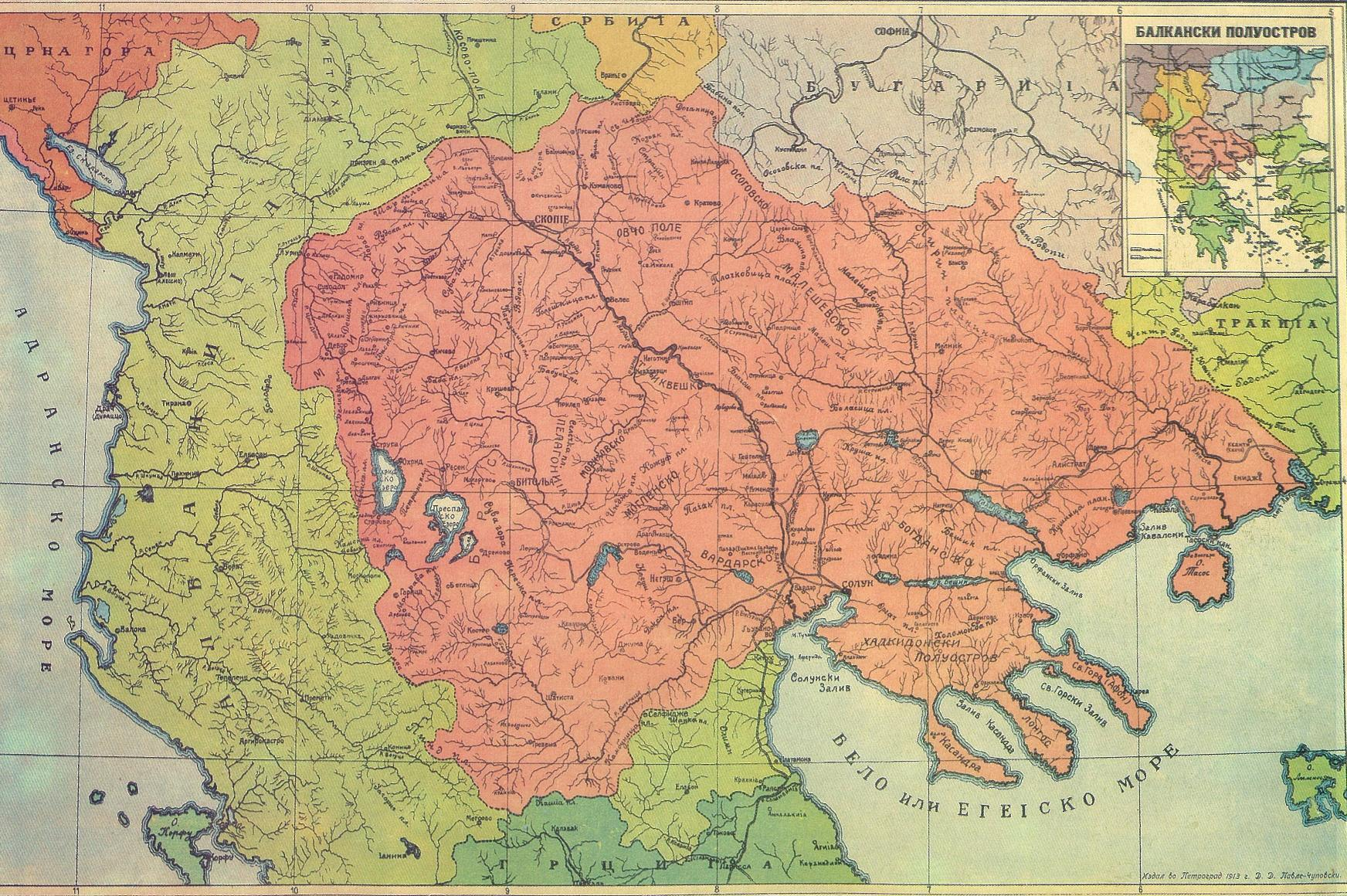
Map of Macedonia on the basis of an earlier publication in the newspaper Macedonian Voice by the Saint Petersburg Macedonian Colony, the map was part of the Memorandum of Independence of Macedonia in 1913.

Per historian Raymond Detrez: "Indeed, until the 1860s, as there are no documents or inscriptions mentioning the Macedonians as a separate ethnic group, all Slavs in Macedonia used to call themselves "Bulgarians". In the 1870s, the region of Macedonia became the object of competition by rival nationalisms, initially Greek nationalists, Serbian nationalists and Bulgarian nationalists each made claims about the Slavic-speaking population as being ethnically linked to their nation and asserted the right to seek their integration. Rival nationalisms used religious and educational institutions to tie the population to their respective national cause by means of intense propaganda campaigns, so that the territorial claims over Macedonia can be validated. Nationalist propaganda put a difficult choice before the Macedonian Slav peasant to be a part of the Rum millet or Bulgarian millet, as this choice was interpreted as a choice of nationality - a way of thinking that was foreign to most peasants. The Bulgarian Exarchate launched an educational campaign, which managed to implant in Macedonian Slavs a Bulgarian national ideology.

The first documented assertions of Macedonian nationalism arose in the second half of the 19th century. According to Petko Slaveykov in the article "The Macedonian Question" in his newspaper Makedoniya in 1871, some young intellectuals from Macedonia were claiming that they are not Bulgarians, but they are rather Macedonians, descendants of the ancient Macedonians. Another basis on which they distinguished themselves from Bulgarians was that Macedonians were pure Slavs, while the Bulgarians were Tatars. Furthermore, they believed that the Bulgarian Exarchate is as oppressive as the Greek Patriarchate in terms of local ecclesiastic and scholarly matters. In a letter written to the Bulgarian Exarch in February 1874, Slaveykov reports that discontent with the current situation "has given birth among local patriots to the disastrous idea of working independently on the advancement of their own local dialect and what’s more, of their own, separate Macedonian church leadership." Per Slaveykov, the main task of his newspaper during the 1870s, was to educate such misguided Grecomans there, who he called Macedonists. The origins of the definition of an ethnic Macedonian identity arose from the writings of Gjorgjija Pulevski in the 1870s and 1880s, who identified the existence of a distinct "Slavic Macedonian" language and expressed the idea that the Macedonians were a distinct people. By 1875, the publications began to shift the movement from anti‑Hellenization struggle to a Bulgarian‑Macedonian confrontation. Pulevski analyzed the folk histories of the Slavic Macedonian people, in which he concluded that Slavic Macedonians were ethnically linked to the people of the ancient Kingdom of Macedonia of Philip II and Alexander the Great, based on the claim that ancient Macedonians were Slavic, and modern-day Slavic Macedonians were their descendants. The Macedonian myth of Alexander the Great appeared in two documents related to the Kresna Uprising in 1878, whose authenticity is disputed by Bulgarian historians. In one of them the revolutionaries, including Pulevski himself, saw themselves as heirs of the army of Alexander of Macedon and were prepared to shed their blood as he once did. Drawing on the same arguments, some earlier Bulgarian "revivalists" claimed that the ancient Macedonians were Bulgarians. Pulevski viewed Macedonians' identity as being a regional phenomenon (similar to Herzegovinians and Thracians). Once calling himself a "Serbian patriot", another time a "Bulgarian from the village of Galicnik", he also identified the Slavic Macedonian language as being related to the "Old Bulgarian language" as well as being a "Serbo-Albanian language". Pulevski's numerous identifications reveal the absence of a clear ethnic sense in a part of the local Slavic population. In 1892, Pulevski largely completed the first "Slavic-Macedonian General History", with a manuscript of over 1,700 pages. According to the book, the ancient Macedonians were Slavic people and the Macedonian Slavs were native to the Balkans, in contrast of the Bulgarians and the Serbs, who came there centuries later.

Some of the first Macedonists were educated in Serbia or under Serbian cultural influence, such as Naum Evro(vić), Kosta Grupče(vić), Temko Popov(ić) and Vasil(ije) Karajovov(ić), who established the Secret Macedonian Committee in 1886. It advocated for things repeated by other early Macedonian nationalists, such as re-establishment of the Archbishopric of Ohrid, creation of schools where Macedonian would be taught, the publication of a Macedonian newspaper against Bulgarian influence in Constantinople. In 1888, in a letter to the Serbian minister of education in Belgrade, Serbian diplomat Stojan Novaković suggested promoting Macedonism among the Ottoman Macedonian Slavs to counter Bulgarian influence in Macedonia and to gradually Serbianize the Macedonian Slavs. Macedonism had some support from the Serbian government which considered it a tool in the fight against Bulgarian influence in Macedonia, however, it was not significant. Other proponents of Macedonian nationalism were Stefan Dedov and Dijamandija Mišajkov.

Up until the 20th century and beyond, the majority of the Slavic-speaking population of the region was identified as Macedono-Bulgarian or simply as Bulgarian and after 1870 joined the Bulgarian Exarchate. Per John Van Antwerp Fine, from the 9th century until the late 19th century, the outside observers and those Slavic Macedonians who had clear ethnic consciousness, believed they were Bulgarians. As seen by observers, the affiliation of Macedonian Slavs to different national camps was not belonging to an ethnic group, but rather political and flexible option. Any expression of national identity among the majority of Macedonian Slavs was purely superficial and was imposed by the nationalist educational and religious propaganda or by terrorism from guerrilla bands. More astute foreign observers who visited Macedonia at the time concluded that Macedonian Slavs linguistically were not Bulgarians nor Serbs. Per historian Barbara Jelavich, it is possible to argue that the Macedonian Slavs formed a separate nationality.

The Internal Macedonian Revolutionary Organization (IMRO) grew up as the major Macedonian separatist organization in the 1890s, seeking the autonomy of Macedonia from the Ottoman Empire. It devised the slogan "Macedonia for the Macedonians" and called for a supranational Macedonia, consisting of different nationalities. The IMRO initially opposed being dependent on any of the neighboring states, and especially tried to hold back the influence of Greece and Serbia in the area. However, its relationship with Bulgaria was more ambiguous, but there was a faction which firmly opposed any annexation from Bulgaria. Despite that, the autonomism and separatism of IMRO members were supranational, they stimulated the development of Macedonian nationalism, particularly by the leftist activists. Although he was appointed Bulgarian metropolitan bishop, in 1891, Theodosius of Skopje attempted to restore the Archbishopric of Ohrid as an autonomous Macedonian church, but his idea failed. In this period, he thought that there was an ethnic difference between Macedonians and their Orthodox Christian neighbors.

Macedonism was connected with the philologist and teacher Krste Misirkov and Dimitrija Čupovski. The intellectual center of the movement was the Macedonian Scientific and Literary Society in Saint Petersburg in the Russian Empire. Misirkov's 1903 book On Macedonian Matters is considered the "manifesto" of Macedonian nationalism and "both a political pamphlet and the first serious attempt at standardization of the Slavic vernacular language of Macedonia". In the book, Misirkov advocated for affirmation of the Macedonians as a separate people. Misirkov considered that the term "Macedonian" should be used to define the whole Slavic population of Macedonia, obliterating the existing division between Greeks, Bulgarians and Serbians. The adoption of a separate Macedonian language was also advocated and he outlined an overview of the Macedonian grammar and expressed the ultimate goal of codifying the language and using it as the language of instruction in the education system. The book was written in the dialect of central Macedonia (Veles-Prilep-Bitola-Ohrid) which was proposed by Misirkov as the basis for the future language, and, as he wrote, a dialect which is most different from all other neighboring languages (Bulgarian and Serbian). During the 1913/1914 period, Čupovski published the newspaper Macedonian Voice in Russian in which he and fellow members of the Petersburg Macedonian Colony propagandized the existence of a separate Macedonian people different from Greeks, Bulgarians and Serbs, and sought to popularize the idea for an independent Macedonian state. Some of its articles were written by Krste Misirkov.

At the beginning of the 20th century, Macedonism was marginal and had very little influence among the Slavs in Macedonia. Despite all the memorandums, manifestos and articles issued by the Macedonian national ideologists, they were isolated cases and not internationally important. In the early 20th century, the Socialist International accepted the idea of a Balkan Federation proposed by Serbian and Bulgarian left-wing intellectuals. In the late 19th and early 20th century the international community viewed the Macedonian Slavs predominantly as a regional variety of the Bulgarians.

=== Balkan Wars and First World War ===
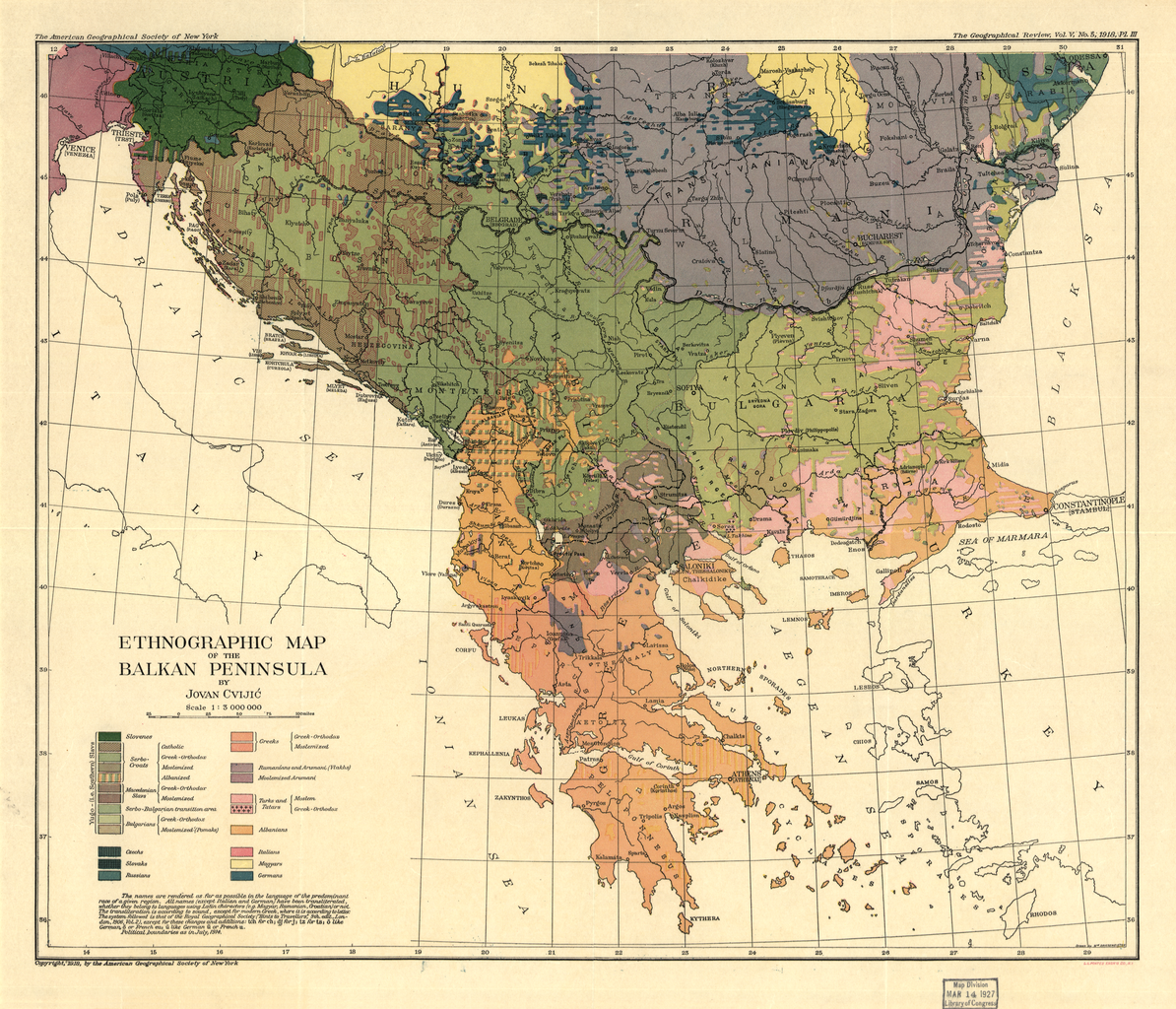
A World War I era ethnographic map of the Balkans by Serbian ethnologist Jovan Cvijić, depicting "Macedonian Slavs" in shades of brown, distinct from Bulgarians and Serbs. The western parts of Bulgaria and northeastern Macedonia are shown as populated by Serbs. In this way, he promoted the idea that Macedonians were in fact Southern Serbs.

During the Balkan Wars and the First World War, the area was exchanged several times between Bulgaria and Serbia. The IMARO supported the Bulgarian army and authorities when they took temporary control over Vardar Macedonia, as well as supporting the Bulgarisation of the area. During this period, the political autonomism was abandoned as a tactic, and annexation by Bulgaria was supported. On the other hand, Serbian authorities put pressure on local people to declare themselves Serbs: they disbanded local governments, established by IMARO in Ohrid, Veles and other cities and persecuted Bulgarian Exarchist priests and teachers, forcing them to flee and replacing them with Serbians. Serbian troops enforced a policy of disarming the local militia, accompanied by beatings and threats. After the Balkan Wars (1912–1913), Ottoman Macedonia was mostly divided between Greece and Serbia, which began a process of Hellenization and Serbianization of the Slavic population. Identical policies of forced assimilation of the Macedonian Slavs were implemented by the Bulgarian authorities during the First World War. According to historian Andrej Mitrović, the population's resistance to Bulgarianisation was constantly felt, alongside a desire for the creation of an independent Macedonia. Due to a strict military regime, these aspirations could not take political or armed form. The Austro-Hungarian military intelligence concluded that many Macedonians favored political separatism over unification with Bulgaria. However, per historian Ulf Brunnbauer, this analysis reflects the official Yugoslav view of Macedonian history. The wars arguably even reinforced the rival Macedonian and Bulgarian narratives of national consciousness in the region, the first one consequently being adopted in the interwar period by the left wing of IMARO. At the end of the First World War, there were very few ethnographers and historians who agreed that a separate Macedonian nation existed. During the Paris Peace Conference of 1919, the Allies sanctioned Serbian control of Vardar Macedonia and accepted the belief that Macedonian Slavs were in fact Southern Serbs. This change in opinion can largely be attributed to the Serbian geographer Jovan Cvijić.

=== Interwar period and World War II ===
During the interwar period, the Macedonian Slavs once again faced competing assimilation efforts, with Kingdom of Yugoslavia pursuing state-sponsored Serbianization and pro-Bulgarian organisations, backed by the Bulgarian government, promoting Bulgarization. In that period, the government abandoned the failed policy of Macedonism. Despite the repressive Serbianization policy during the interwar period in Vardar Macedonia, national consciousness was seemingly growing. Macedonian national ideas increased during the interbellum in Yugoslav Vardar Macedonia and among the leftist diaspora in Bulgaria. On 3 July 1928, the Czechoslovak consul in Skopje, Vladimír Znojemský, wrote to the Ministry of Foreign Affairs that the Macedonian Slavic population is neither Bulgarian, nor Serbian, but mostly without any clear national consciousness. In 1934, the Comintern in accordance with IMRO (United) issued a resolution about the recognition of a separate Macedonian ethnicity. As a result, Macedonism gained support from the communist parties of Yugoslavia, Greece and Bulgaria. The Comintern, in which Bulgarian communists were influential, had contributed to the development of Macedonian nationalism by promoting the idea of a Balkan Federation, with Macedonia as a separate federal unit, as a solution to the Macedonian Question. Yugoslav, Bulgarian and Greek communists promoted the Macedonian national identity. In the interwar period, Bulgarian communism was crucial in the development and the international legitimization of Macedonian nationalism. The communist circles that made the first drafts of the Macedonian historiographical narrative were mostly affiliated with the Bulgarian Communist Party, as well as with international communism.

Macedonian nationalism flourished in the Macedonian Literary Circle in Sofia, which was affiliated with the Bulgarian Communist Party. Its members were tasked with creating Macedonian literature, researching the Macedonian history and the folklore, although many of them were able to write only in Bulgarian. In 1938, Jaroslav Machaè, Czechoslovak Consul General in Skopje, wrote that most of the inhabitants of Macedonia are Macedonians who must be considered as a separate nation. The existence of considerable Macedonian national consciousness prior to the 1940s is disputed, as most of the people were unable to precisely identify what they were.

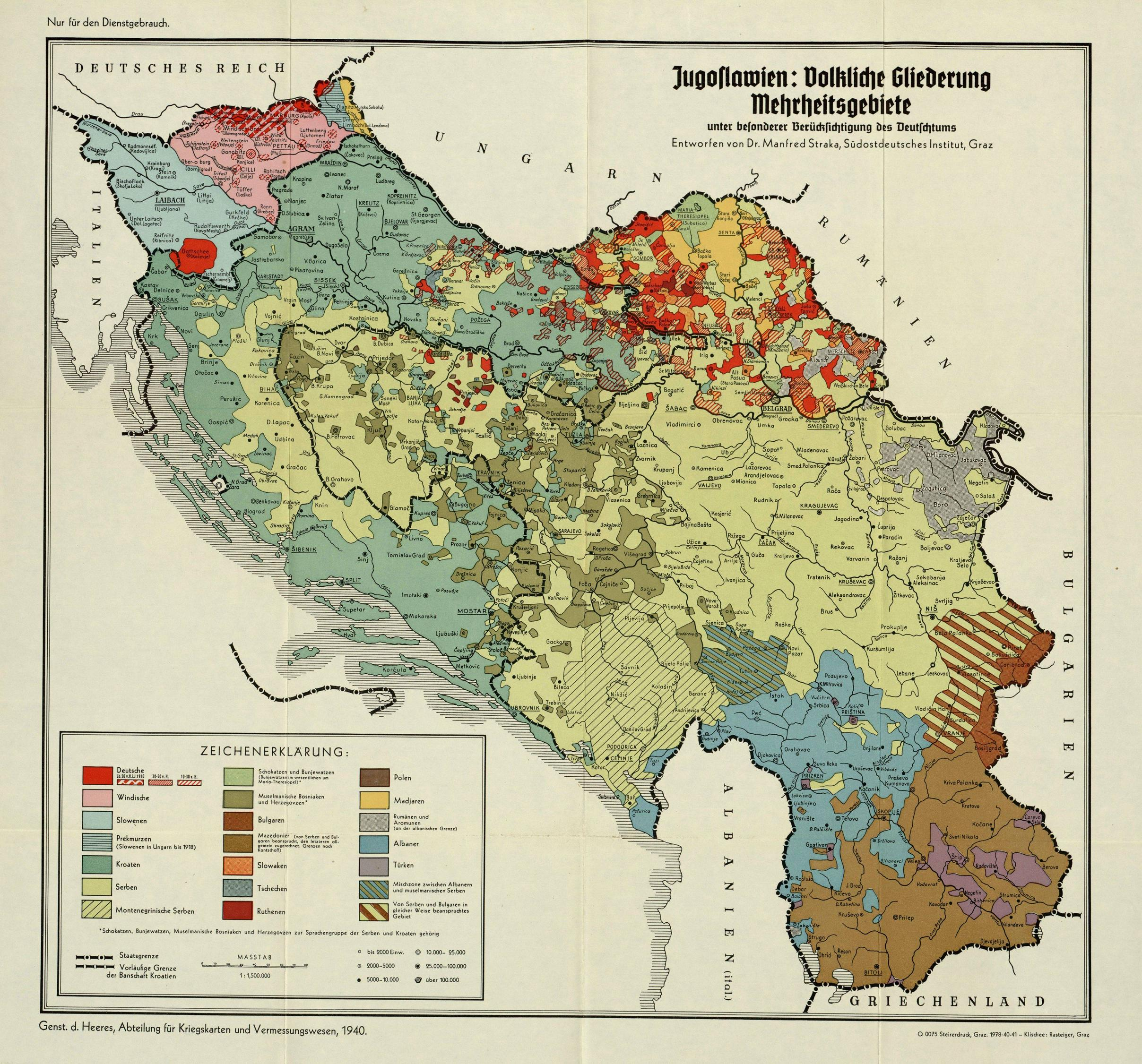
German ethnic map of Yugoslavia from 1940. Macedonians are depicted as a separate community, and described as claimed by Serbs and Bulgarians, but generally attributed to the last ones.

During the Second World War, the area was annexed by Bulgaria and pro-Bulgarian feelings among the local population prevailed as a result of the previous oppressive Serbian rule. Thus, Vardar Macedonia remained the only region where Yugoslav communist leader Josip Broz Tito had not developed a strong partisan movement in 1941, because the population feared re-establishment of the oppressive Serbian rule. In order to enforce the Bulgarization campaign over the Slavs, the new provinces were quickly staffed with officials from Bulgaria proper who behaved with typical official arrogance to the local inhabitants. The wartime Bulgarization policies, national chauvinism and suffering backlash generated sizeable support for the Yugoslav Partisans, and caused even the anti-Yugoslav Macedonians that returned from exile to seek allies among the communists. In 1942, Bulgarian official reports documented distinct expressions of Macedonian self-identification and political separatism among local populations and settlers in Greek Eastern Macedonia. Adherents of this movement advocated for the creation of an autonomous Macedonian state and sought to impose only Macedonians in the administrative, professional, and cultural positions. Local Macedonian public employees openly challenged the Bulgarian presence, declaring "here is Macedonia" and asserting that Bulgarians were merely temporary "guests" who should leave. This separatist sentiment was also popular among local youth, including high school students in Serres region. The ideological profile of the activists was not clear. The power of the Yugoslav Partisans started to grow after Tito ordered the establishment of the Communist Party of Macedonia in March 1943 and the second AVNOJ congress on 29 November 1943 did recognize the Macedonian nation as separate entity. Harsh treatment by occupying Bulgarian troops reduced the pro-Bulgarian orientation of the Macedonian Slavs even more which made them embrace the emerging Macedonian identity. The Communist Party of Macedonia stressed that the struggle is not for the restoration of the old Yugoslavia, but above all for the liberation and unification of Macedonia and a new federal union of Yugoslav peoples with an extension of its prewar territory. Thus attracting more and more young Macedonians to the armed resistance. The public expression of Macedonian nationalism was encouraged with the growth of the Yugoslav partisan movement, which ended Bulgarian influence in the Communist Party of Macedonia. The communists' power started further to grow with the capitulation of Italy and the Soviet victories over Nazi Germany in 1943. Thousands of partisans in Yugoslav Macedonia accepted the Macedonian national cause. Ethnic Macedonians in Greece were permitted to publish newspapers in Macedonian and run schools. The Slavomacedonian National Liberation Front (SNOF) was formed in October 1943. After the end of the Greek Resistance against the Axis occupation, the SNOF was dissolved in 1944 on the orders of the KKE Central Committee and through British intervention. Headed by Vangel Ajanovski - Oche, some SNOF commanders, dissatisfied with the KKE decision, crossed into Vardar Macedonia and participated in the National Liberation Struggle of Macedonia. The resistance movement grew and in August 1944, the Macedonian Partisans set up the Anti-fascist Assembly for the National Liberation of Macedonia. They proclaimed a Macedonian state as part of Yugoslavia and the Macedonian as official language. After the German troops left the area in November, the new Macedonian government started the codification of the Macedonian language. According to Alexander Maxwell, by 1945 an "ethnic Macedonian nationalism" incompatible with Bulgarian sentiments existed. Some observers argued that by the end of the war, it was doubtful whether the Macedonian Slavs considered themselves as separate from the Bulgarians.

=== Post-World War II ===
Flag of the Socialist Republic of Macedonia.

After 1944, the People's Republic of Bulgaria and the Socialist Federal Republic of Yugoslavia began a policy of making Macedonia into the connecting link for the establishment of a future Balkan Federative Republic and of supporting a distinct ethnic Macedonian consciousness. The region received the status of a constituent republic within Yugoslavia and in 1945, a separate Macedonian language was codified. The population was proclaimed to be ethnic Macedonian, different from both Serbs and Bulgarians, in that way the Bulgarian irredentism towards Yugoslav Macedonia was subverted, as well the claims that Macedonians are Bulgarians were denied, the same applying to the Serbian claims that Macedonians were Serbs, and their Greater Serbian idea that had dominated interwar Yugoslavia. Per historian David Fromkin, SR Macedonia did not have its own national identity in 1945. The overwhelming majority of the Slavic population in Macedonia accepted the new Macedonian national identity without a problem. With the proclamation of the Socialist Republic of Macedonia as part of the Yugoslav federation, the new authorities also enforced measures that would overcome the pro-Bulgarian feeling among parts of its population. The establishment of the Macedonian republic inspired strong loyalty to the Yugoslav federation among the Macedonians. Per historian Evangelos Kofos, Macedonian nationalism became SR Macedonia's dominant nationalist ideology, aimed at transforming the Slavic and, to a certain extent, non-Slavic parts of its population into ethnic Macedonians. According to political scientist Dimitar Bechev, Macedonism was the dominant national ideology among the Slavs in SR Macedonia. Historian Stefan Troebst has argued that in SR Macedonia, Yugoslavism was subordinated to Macedonism. As a multi-national state, the Socialist Federal Republic of Yugoslavia mostly suppressed the national sentiments of its constituent republics to preserve its existence. To maintain good relations among its republics, as well as between the country and its neighbors in the Balkans, particularly Bulgaria and Greece, the Yugoslav federal government strictly limited the expression of Macedonian nationalism.

As a result of the policy with Yugoslavia, when the relations between Bulgaria and Yugoslavia were good, there was an attempt to spread Macedonism and the Macedonian national consciousness to Pirin Macedonia. The Bulgarian Communist Party supported Macedonism in Pirin Macedonia. Schools using Macedonian were opened in 1946 in Pirin Macedonia. Macedonian history, language and literature were introduced as compulsory subjects in 1947. Teachers from SR Macedonia came to teach literary Macedonian. A Macedonian national theater was opened in Gorna Dzhumaya, as well as the first Macedonian library and bookstore. Branches were also opened in Nevrokop, Sveti Vrach and Petrich. Macedonian newspapers and books started to be printed in literary Macedonian. Despite the policy, the majority of the population considered itself as Bulgarian. In the Democratic Army of Greece (DSE) held territory, newspapers and books were published by the new organization formed by Macedonians called National Liberation Front (NOF), public speeches made and the schools opened, helping the consolidation of Macedonian conscience and identity among the population. According to information announced by Paskal Mitrevski on the I plenum of NOF in August 1948, about 85% of the Macedonian-speaking population in Aegean Macedonia identified themselves as ethnic Macedonian. The language that was taught in the schools was the official language of the Socialist Republic of Macedonia. About 20,000 young ethnic Macedonians learned to read and write using that language, and learned their own history.

Ethnic Macedonians fought in the Greek Civil War and made a significant contribution to the initial victories of the DSE. Their significance rose as the conflict progressed due to their increased numbers within the DSE. However, when the Tito–Stalin split arose, Yugoslavia (and the Socialist Republic of Macedonia) closed its border to the DSE, as both the NOF and the DSE supported the Soviet line. At the beginning of the war Markos Vafiadis had an efficient guerilla strategy, and controlled territories from Florina to Attica, and for a short period there were DSE-controlled territories in the Peloponnese. The situation deteriorated after they lost the Greek Civil War. Thousands of Aegean Macedonians were expelled and fled to the newly established Socialist Republic of Macedonia, while thousands of more children took refuge in other Eastern Bloc countries.

Per historian Elisabeth Barker in 1950, the feeling of being exclusively Macedonian is of recent growth and not deeply rooted. According to academic Henry Robert Wilkinson in 1951, Macedonian Slavs were no longer able to identify with the Bulgarians or Serbs. At the end of the 1950s the Bulgarian Communist Party repealed its previous decision and adopted a position denying the existence of a Macedonian ethnicity. All attempts to spread Macedonism were strictly forbidden. Per political scientist Mirjana Maleska, Bulgarophobia in SR Macedonia increased almost to the level of state ideology. This put an end to the idea of a Balkan Communist Federation. During the post-Informbiro period, a separate Macedonian Orthodox Church was established, splitting off from the Serbian Orthodox Church in 1967. The encouragement and evolution of the culture of the Republic of Macedonia has had a far greater and more permanent impact on Macedonian nationalism than has any other aspect of Yugoslav policy. While the development of national music, films and graphic arts had been encouraged in the Socialist Republic of Macedonia, the greatest cultural effect came from the codification of the Macedonian language and literature, the new Macedonian national interpretation of history and the establishment of a Macedonian Orthodox Church. Most Macedonians' attitude to Communist Yugoslavia, where they were recognized as a distinct nation for the first time, became positive.

After the Second World War, Macedonian and Serbian scholars usually defined the ancient local tribes in the area of the Central Balkans as Daco-Moesian. Previously these entities were traditionally regarded in Yugoslavia as Illyrian, in accordance with the romantic early 20th-century interests in the Illyrian movement. At first, the Daco-Moesian tribes were separated through linguistic research. Later, Yugoslav archaeologists and historians came to an agreement that Daco-Moesians should be located in the areas of modern-day Serbia and North Macedonia. The most popular Daco-Moesian tribes described in Yugoslav literature were the Triballians, the Dardanians and the Paeonians. In the 1980s, a Macedonian nationalism (Macedonism) that claimed ancient Macedonia and Alexander the Great emerged in SR Macedonia and the Macedonian diaspora. Nationalists from the diaspora claimed to be descendants of the ancient Macedonians. Mainstream Yugoslav Macedonian historiography was cautious and argued that the link between the ethnic Macedonians and their ancient namesakes was, at best, accidental. In 1989, the Yugoslav Macedonian authorities revised the state's constitution so that SR Macedonia was defined as a "nation-state of Macedonian people" instead of "a state of the Macedonian people and the Albanian and Turkish minorities". These authorities had concerns about Albanian nationalism and the possible breakup of Yugoslavia, which was expressed in a more aggressive Macedonian nationalism, from them and nationalists in new political groups like VMRO-DPMNE.

=== Post-independence period ===
Macedonian flag from 1992 to 1995

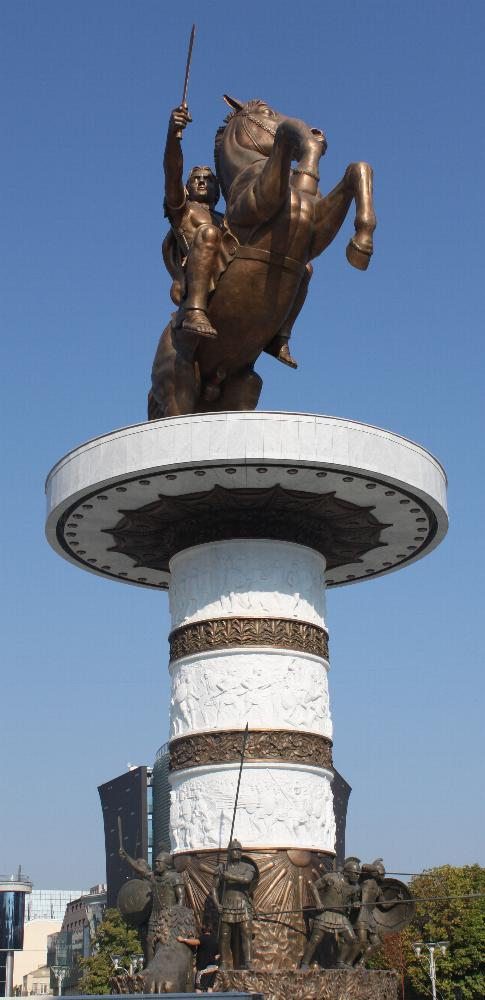
Monument of Alexander the Great on the Macedonia Square in Skopje.

On 8 September 1991, the Socialist Republic of Macedonia held a referendum that established its independence from Yugoslavia. Bulgaria contested the country's national identity and language, Greece contested its name and symbols, and Serbia contested its religious identity. On the other hand, the ethnic Albanians in the country insisted on being recognized as a nation, equal to the ethnic Macedonians. In the 1990s, Macedonian nationalism was weak as ethnic Macedonians were led by moderates. Macedonian nationalism was divided between maximalists and minimalists. Maximalists wanted to include "all Macedonians" (including those outside the borders of the country) into the new Macedonian state. Minimalists wanted to preserve the existing state in such a way that ethnic Macedonians would be treated as the only political nation in it, with Albanians as a minority. VMRO-DPMNE promoted Macedonian nationalism at the expense of the inclusion of the local Albanians as equal partners in the new state. The Macedonian nationalists of the party wanted to define the new state as the "national state of the Macedonian people". On the other hand, moderate Macedonians and Albanians wanted to define it as a civil state for all of its citizens. In its more extreme forms, Macedonian nationalism advocates for United Macedonia. Per historian John D. Bell, Macedonian nationalism was mobilized in the early 1990s "as a response to the Greek contention that the inhabitants of the new Macedonian Republic should not be allowed to call themselves "Macedonians" and to the Bulgarian denial of a separate Macedonian identity." A more assertive form of Macedonian nationalism, strongly promoted by the Macedonian diaspora in Australia, Canada and the United States, had a negative impact on the relations between Macedonians and Albanians as it made the former less receptive to the latter's concerns. Bell referred to:

a new form of "Macedonism" that differs from the simple proposition that Macedonians are a distinct nationality. Having its origins, apparently, in emigre communities in Australia and Canada, this doctrine asserts that the ancient Macedonians were a pure Aryan people who migrated to Macedonia from India. Their language was the original "Slavic" tongue that was later learned by surrounding peoples who labored, "slaved," in their fields. The Greeks, "dark-skinned, Semitic" immigrants to the Balkans in the fifth century b.c., borrowed a form of the Macedonian alphabet, worshiped the Macedonian kings (the origin of the Greek pantheon), and borrowed/stole and then polluted Macedonian culture. Hellenism was originally not Greek, but "Macedonianism," spread through the known world by Alexander the Great. This form of "Macedonian fundamentalism" also predicts a future unification of the separated parts of the Macedonian nation. While "orthodox" Macedonian nationalists have denounced the fundamentalists as "rabble . . . neo-fascists, and even neo-Nazis," there are indications that their beliefs have attracted some following in Macedonia itself and among separatists in the Pirin.

In the 2000s, the concept of ancient Paionian identity was changed to a kind of mixed Paionian-Macedonian identity which was later transformed to a separate ancient Macedonian identity, establishing a direct link to the modern ethnic Macedonians. After the Greek veto on the 21st NATO Summit in 2008, the nationalist ruling party VMRO-DPMNE pursued the so-called "antiquization" policy, as a way of putting pressure on Greece, as well as for the purposes of domestic identity-building. The extreme Macedonian nationalist position is that the ethnic Macedonians are not descendants of the Slavs, but of the ancient Macedonians, who, according to them, were not Greeks. Moderate Macedonians dispute this claim. Antiquization also spread due to very intensive lobbying by the Macedonian diaspora, particularly those originating from Greek Macedonia, in the United States, Canada, Germany and Australia. Some members of the Macedonian diaspora even believed, without basis, that certain modern historians, namely Ernst Badian, Peter Green, and Eugene Borza, possessed a pro-Macedonian bias in the Macedonian-Greek conflict, although per Borza they did share certain similarities in their views.

As part of this policy, statues of Alexander the Great and Philip II of Macedon have been built in several cities across the country. In 2011, a massive, 22-meter-tall statue of Alexander the Great (called "Warrior on a horse" because of the dispute with Greece) was inaugurated in Macedonia Square in Skopje, as part of the Skopje 2014 remodelling of the city. An even larger statue of Philip II was also constructed at the other end of the square. A triumphal arch named Porta Macedonia, constructed in the same square, featuring images of historical figures including Alexander the Great, caused the Greek Foreign Ministry to lodge an official complaint to authorities in the Republic of Macedonia. Statues of Alexander are also on display in the town squares of Prilep and Štip, while a statue to Philip II of Macedon was built in Bitola. Additionally, many pieces of public infrastructure, such as airports, highways, and stadiums were named after ancient historical figures or entities. Skopje's airport was renamed "Alexander the Great Airport" and features antique objects moved from Skopje's archeological museum. One of Skopje's main squares has been renamed Pella Square (after Pella, the capital of the ancient kingdom of Macedon), while the main highway to Greece was renamed to "Alexander of Macedon" and Skopje's largest stadium was renamed "Philip II Arena". These actions were seen as deliberate provocations in neighboring Greece, exacerbating the dispute and further stalling Macedonia's EU and NATO applications. In 2008, a visit by Hunza Prince was organized in the Republic of Macedonia. The Hunza people of Northern Pakistan trace their descent to the army of Alexander the Great. The Hunza delegation led by Mir Ghazanfar Ali Khan was welcomed at the Skopje Airport by the country's prime minister Nikola Gruevski, the head of the Macedonian Orthodox Church Archbishop Stephen and the mayor of Skopje, Trifun Kostovski.

Antiquization was criticized by academics as it demonstrates feebleness of archaeology and of other historical disciplines in public discourse, as well as a danger of marginalization. The policy also attracted criticism domestically, by ethnic Macedonians within the country, who saw it as dangerously dividing the country between those who identify with classical antiquity and those who identify with the country's Slavic culture. Local ethnic Albanians saw it as an attempt to marginalize them and exclude them from the national narrative. Foreign diplomats had warned that the policy reduced international sympathy for the Republic of Macedonia in the then-naming dispute with Greece. The background of antiquization can be found in the 19th century and the myth of ancient descent among Orthodox Slavic-speakers in Macedonia. It was adopted partially due to Greek cultural inputs. This idea was also included in the national mythology during the post-World War II Yugoslavia. Contemporary antiquization was revived as an efficient tool for political mobilization and was reinforced by VMRO-DPMNE. There were also attempts at scientific claims about ancient nationhood, but they had a negative impact on the international position of the country.

On 27 April 2017, about 200 Macedonian nationalists (some of whom were sympathizers of VMRO-DPMNE) stormed the Macedonian Parliament in reaction to the election of Talat Xhaferi, an ethnic Albanian and a former NLA commander, as Speaker of the Assembly of the Republic of Macedonia. In August 2017, the consul of the Republic of Macedonia to Canada attended a nationalist Macedonian event in Toronto and delivered a speech against the backdrop of an irredentist map of Greater Macedonia. This triggered strong protests from the Greek side, which regarded this as a sign that irredentism remained the dominant state ideology and everyday political practice in the neighboring country. Following strong diplomatic protests, however, the Foreign Ministry of the Republic of Macedonia condemned the incident and recalled its diplomat back to Skopje for consultations.

== See also ==
- Macedonia (terminology)
- World Macedonian Congress
- History of the Macedonians (ethnic group)
- Rise of nationalism under the Ottoman Empire
- Albanian nationalism in North Macedonia
