= Dedov =

Dedov (Russian: Дедов), and its feminine form Dedova (Russian: Дедова), is a Russian surname that has been borne by, among others:

- Alexandru Dedov (born 1989), Moldovan footballer.
- Alexey Dedov (born 1960), Russian diplomat.
- Eva Dedova (born 1992), Kazakh Turkish actress.
- Valentina Dedova, married name of Russian diver Valentina Chumicheva (1931–2021).
- Stefan Dedov (1869 – 1914), was a Bulgarian journalist, writer and early proponent of the Macedonian Slavs' ethnonational distinctiveness.

== See also ==
- Dědová, a village in the Czech Republic
