= Nace Dimov =

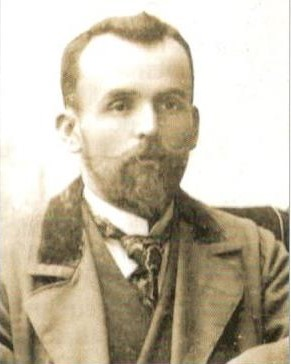
- Nace Dimov in 1902
- Born: January 31, 1876; Papradište, Ottoman Empire
- Died: July 15, 1916 (aged 40); Petrograd, Russian Empire
- Citizenship: Ottoman and Bulgarian
- Occupations: writer and lawyer
- Relatives: Dimitrija Čupovski (brother)

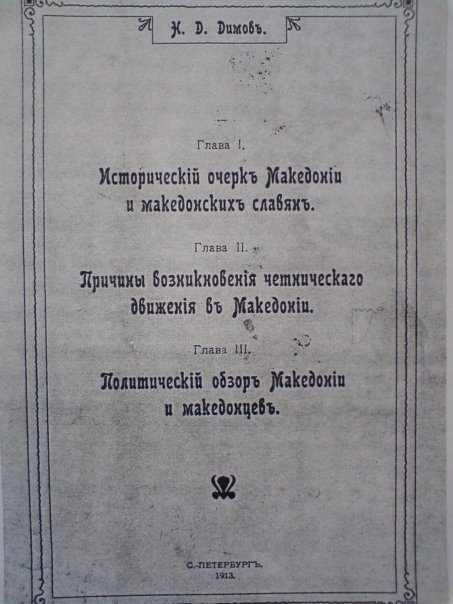
Historical Outline of Macedonia and the Macedonian Slavs (1913)

Nace Dimov (Macedonian: Наце Димов; 1876–1916), also known as Atanas Dimov Čupovski оr Čuparov, was a Macedonian political and cultural activist. He was the older brother of Dimitrija Čupovski. Dimov was a writer on the Macedonian Voice newspaper. Among his publications include "Macedonia in the Past, Present and Future" and "Historical Outline of Macedonia and the Macedonian Slavs".

== Biography ==
Dimov was born on 31 January 1876 in the village of Papradište, near Veles. After Albanian bandits killed his father, the family moves to Kruševo. From there, Nace left to earn money in Bulgaria. In Sofia, he began studying at an evening school and joined the Young Macedonian Literary Association. Later Dimov started working in the railway in Varna, from where he emigrated to Odessa, Russia. In 1901, he was among the men that established the Macedonian Scientific and Literary Society in Saint Petersburg. Dimov also sought to establish a vocational school in Saint Petersburg with Macedonian as the language of instruction.

Dimov and his fellow Macedonian activists in Russia visited with various Russian editorial offices to draw attention to the inevitable partition of Macedonia. As the Balkan Wars broke out, these activists sought to facilitate internal resistance in Macedonia and establish representation for an anticipated peace conference; Dimov went to Sofia to engage with the Macedonian emigrants there.

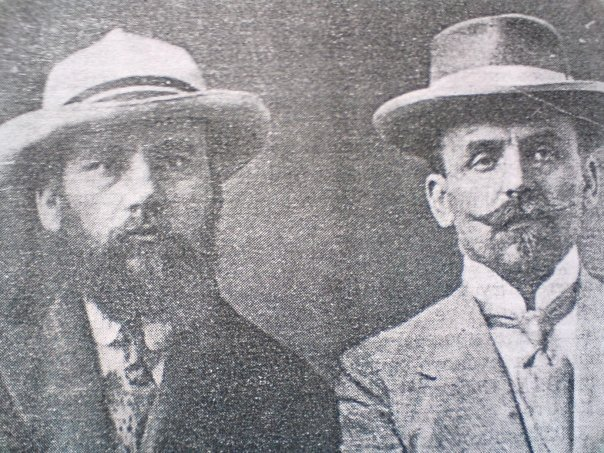
Dimitrija Čupovski with his brother Nace Dimov.

On 1 March 1913, Dimov and the other representatives of the Macedonian Colony in Saint Petersburg submitted the Memorandum of Independence of Macedonia to the British Foreign Secretary and to ambassadors of great powers; it was printed in many European newspapers. A few days later, on 4 March 1913, Dimov presented a lecture "Macedonia in the Past, Present and the Future" in which he demanded that the allies end their ambitions on the Macedonian people, that Macedonia be left a united Slavic unit, and that this independent state of Macedonia participate in the Balkan Alliance. This lecture was later published. In "Historical Outline of Macedonia and the Macedonian Slavs", published in March 1913, Dimov wrote that the Macedonian nation had always been one united, independent state despite falling under Roman and Byzantine rule; they always remained "brave, defenders of Slavic ideas, of the Orthodox Church, and of literature and culture." A few months later, on 7 June 1913, before the Second Balkan War, Dimov was among the individuals who signed a memorandum appealing for an independent Macedonian state on the basis that it is home to a Slavic tribe with "its own history, its own tradition, its own former statehood, its own ideals, and hence has the right to self-determination". In summer 1913, Dimov spoke at the Lawyers' Society in Saint Petersburg, which was also attended by Bulgarian and Serbian representatives. His "fervent speech" in which he sought to prove that a peaceful Balkans could only be achieved with an undivided autonomous Macedonia was "met with strong approval". He also identified himself as a pacifist in this speech.

Dimov also wrote on the topic of the ancient Macedonians, perhaps misquoting Jacob Abbot, that their language was unintelligible to the Greeks.

Dimov died in Petrograd on 15 July 1916, at age 40. His brother Čupovski inscribed on his memorial that "He lived and fought for the rights and freedom of the Macedonian people. He died far from his homeland without ever seeing it free."
