= Milan Stoilov =

Socialist revolutionary

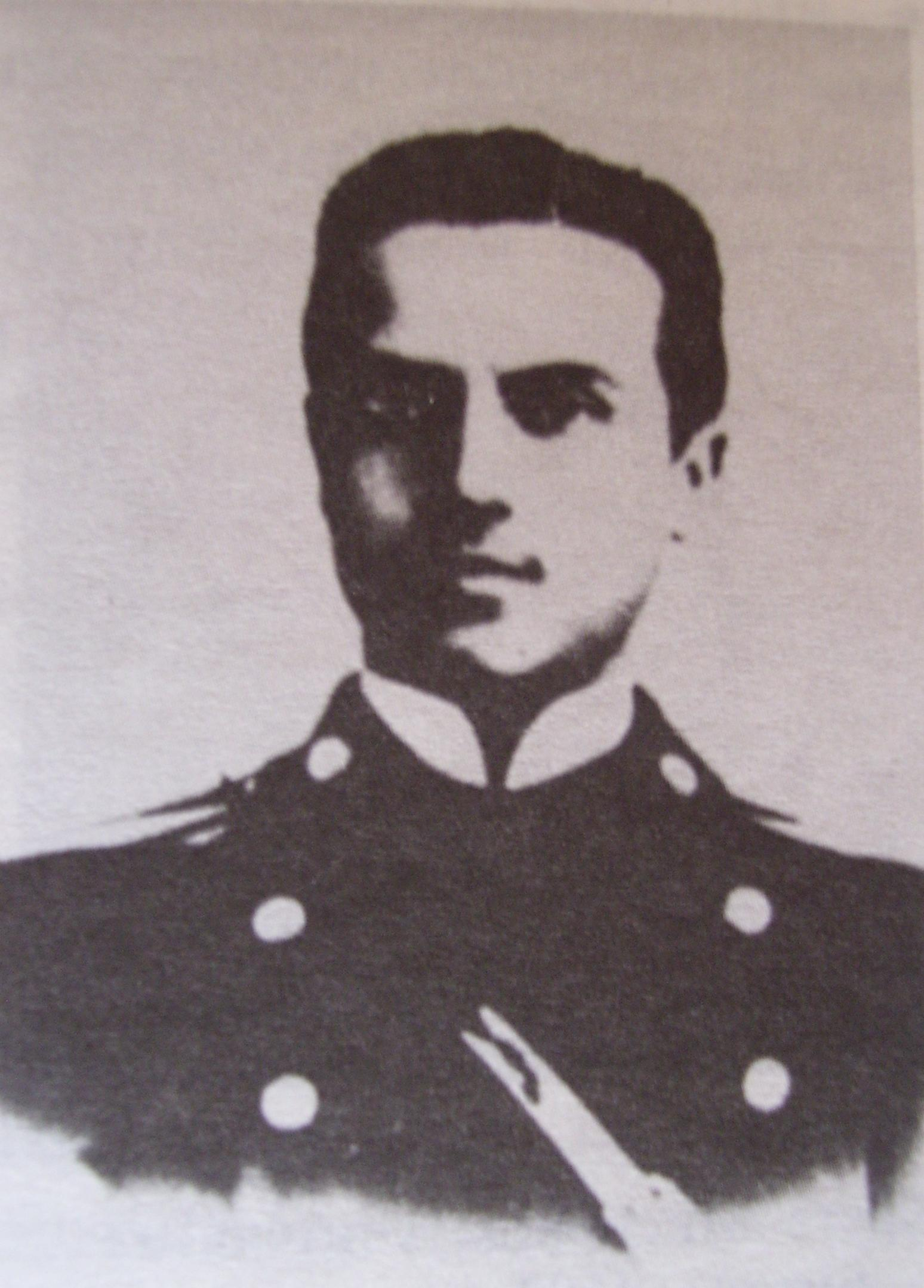
Milan Stoilov as a medical cadet.

Milan Trajkov Stoilov (Macedonian: Милан Траjков Стоилов, Bulgarian: Милан Трайков Стоилов; 1881–1903) was a socialist revolutionary from the region of Macedonia. According to Macedonian historians, he was a Macedonian activist. However according to Bulgarian historians, he is regarded as a Bulgarian revolutionary. (Note: According to Russian researcher Dmitri Labauri, both Bulgarian and Macedonian historians have created two different views on the early 20th century Slavic Macedonian student emigration in Russia, to which Stoilov belonged. Bulgarian historians mainly emphasize the activities of the Secret Macedonian-Adrianople Circle, while Macedonian historians focus on the Slavic-Macedonian Scientific and Literary Society. For more see: Мемуары Христо Шалдева как источник по истории болгарских студенческих объединений в России в начале XX в. (Уральский государственный университет, Екатеринбург) в Россия - Болгария: векторы взаимопонимания. XVIII-XXI вв. Российско-болгарские научные дискуссии. Ритта Петровна Гришина (отв. редактор); Институт славяноведения РАН, Москва 2010, стр. 166-167)

== Biography ==
Born in Kilkis, then in the Ottoman Empire, Stoilov graduated from the town's Bulgarian primary school and junior high school in 1892 and in 1895, respectively. In 1902, he graduated from the Bulgarian Theological Seminary in Constantinople. That year, he began his studies at the Saint Petersburg Military Medical Academy. In Saint Petersburg, he participated in the Secret Macedonian-Adrianople Circle, which was an offshoot of the Supreme Macedonian-Adrianople Committee. Stoilov was a member of the Macedonian Scientific and Literary Society and served as its secretary. He was involved in the third official act of the Society, which included documenting minutes of its 29 December 1902 session.

In 1903, he left Russia to join the Ilinden Uprising against the Ottomans. In July, he arrived in Sofia and presented himself as a volunteer at the Overseas Representation of the IMARO, from where he was assigned to a detachment going to Ottoman Macedonia under Nikola Dechev. Stoilov headed a medical squad. He was killed in a fighting in Orizari, near Kočani, on 5 September 1903. According to other reports, he was heavily wounded and captured by the Turks and died in prison in Kočani in 1904. As a socialist-internationalist, he claimеd that he was not going to die for a certain nation or as a patriot, but as a revolutionary fighting for the good of humanity.

Stoilov also authored "The Kilkis Vampire" ("Кукушкият вампир"), a didactic novel written in Bulgarian.
