= Papradište, Čaška =

Papradište Папрадиште
- Village
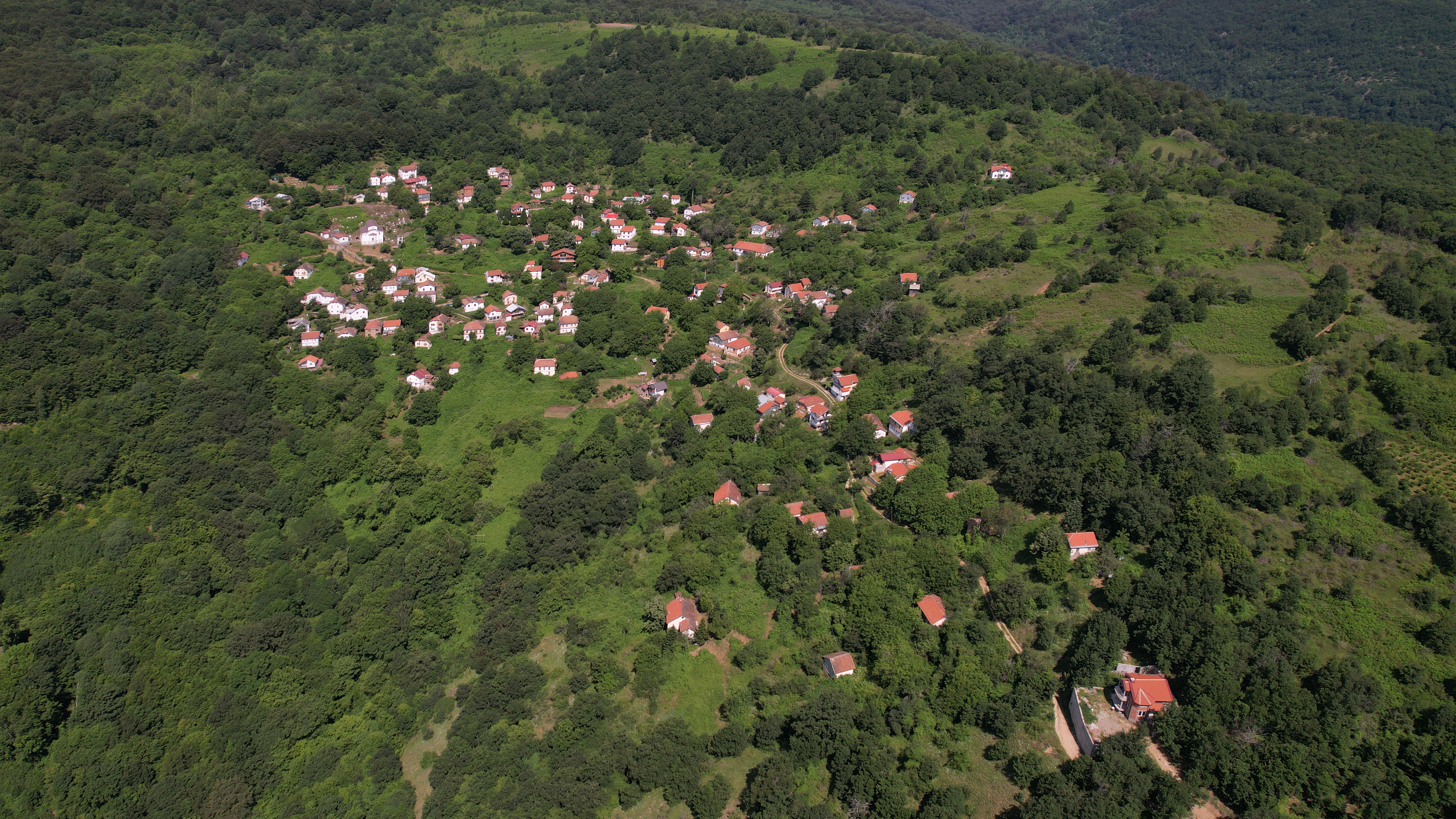
- Air view of the village

- Location within North Macedonia
- Country: North Macedonia
- Region: Vardar
- Municipality: Čaška

Population (2021)
  - Total: 14
- Time zone: UTC+1 (CET)
  - Summer (DST): UTC+2 (CEST)
- Website: .

Papradište (Macedonian: Папрадиште) is a village in the municipality of Čaška, North Macedonia. It used to be part of the former municipality of Bogomila.

== Demographics ==
According to the 2021 census, the village had a total of 14 inhabitants. Ethnic groups in the village include:

- Macedonians 14

| Year | Macedonian | Albanian | Turks | Romani | Vlachs | Serbs | Bosniaks | Others | Total |
|---|---|---|---|---|---|---|---|---|---|
| 2002 | 7 | ... | ... | ... | ... | ... | ... | ... | 7 |
| 2021 | 14 | ... | ... | ... | ... | ... | ... | ... | 14 |

== Notable people ==
- Dimitrija Čupovski (1878–1940), writer, lexicographer, and activist
- Andrey Damyanov (1813–1878), architect
- Nace Dimov (1876–1916), writer and activist
- Đorđe Zografski (1871–1945), artist
- Despot Badžović (1850–1932), educator
