= Đorđe Zografski =

Artist, painter

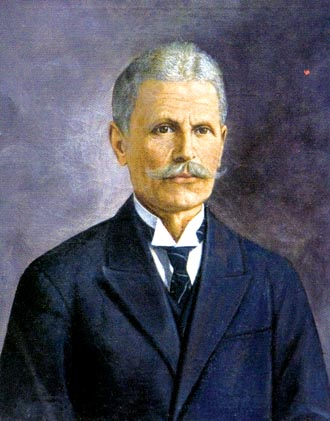
Self-portrait

Georgi Zografski (also known as Đorđe Zografski; 1871– 1945) was an artist active in the Ottoman Empire, Bulgaria, Serbia, Russia and Yugoslavia in the first half of the twentieth century.

== Biography ==
He was born to a family of Mijak origin from Reka, whose ancestors moved to the village of Papradište. From 1907 to 1912 he worked in Niš, Serbia. Zografski largely painted icons and frescoes in the town of Niš and surrounding region. He later worked in Surdulica and Kuršumlija with his father who was also an artist. While in Nis, he painted several portraits which disappeared after the World war. He also collaborated with Dušan Miletić at the Church of St. Pantelemion in Niš.

In 2011, one of his paintings from 1910, was discovered. It was a group portrait of a merchant family. The portrait was seriously damaged by bomb shrapnel during the bombardment of Niš during World War II (4 April 1944) and was in need of significant restoration work.

Zografski died in 1945 in Skopje. In 1963 his remains were reburied in Veles.
