= Memorandum of Independence of Macedonia (1913) =

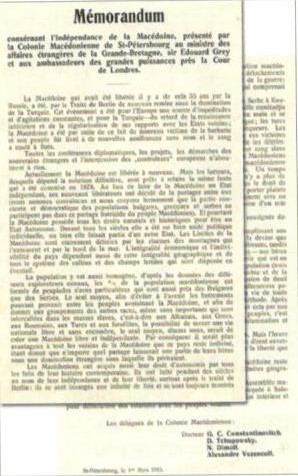
- Scanned version of the document
- Original title: Mémorandum concernant l'indépendance de la Macédoine
- Illustrator: Dimitrija Čupovski
- Language: French
- Genre: Memorandum
- Publication date: March 1, 1913

The Memorandum of Independence of Macedonia (French: Mémorandum consérnant l'indépendance de la Macédoine) is a document published on March 1, 1913 by four former members of the Macedonian Scientific and Literary Society. They insisted on the independence of the modern region of Macedonia.

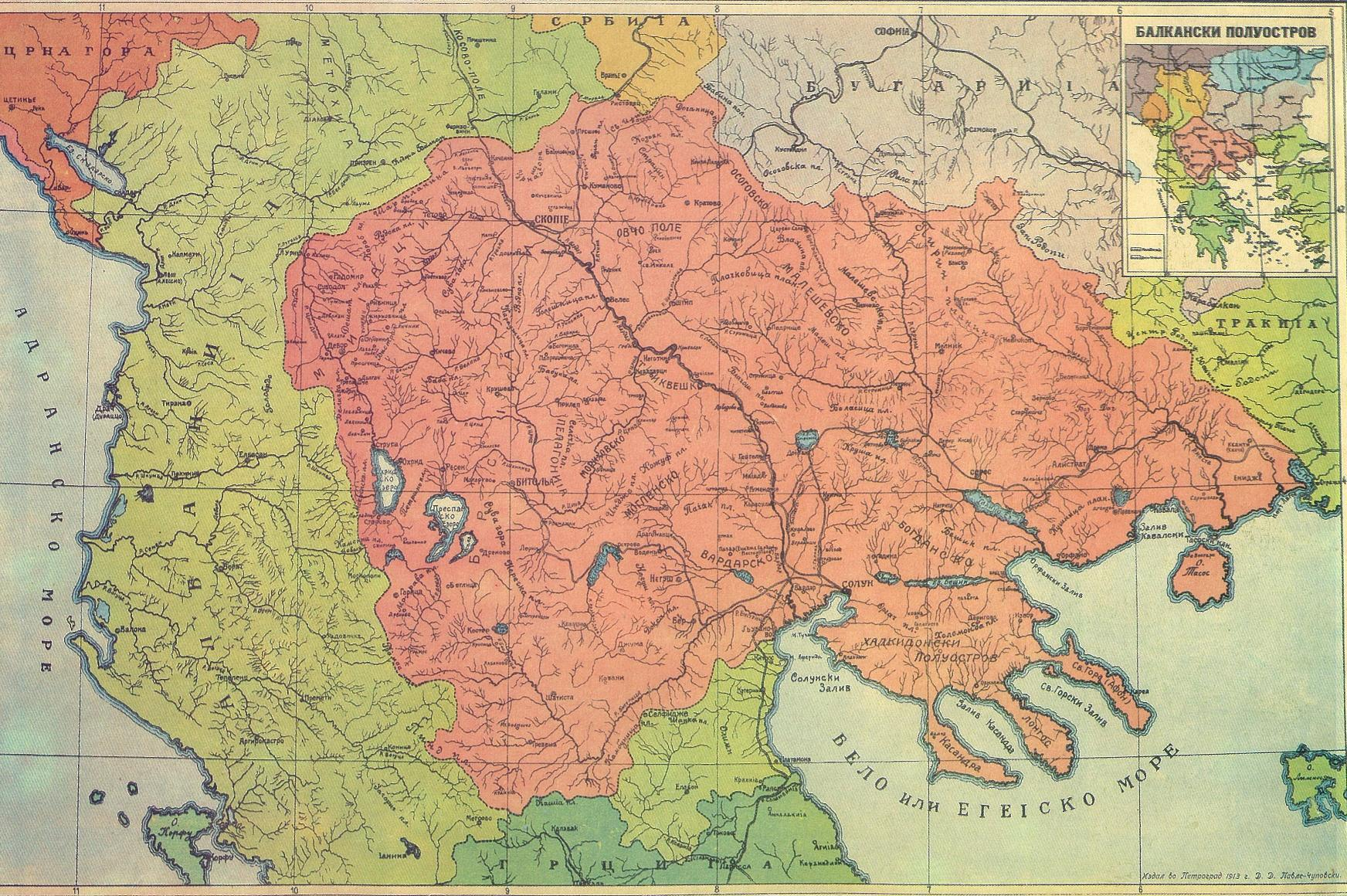
Map of Macedonia from a publication in the newspaper Makedonski Golos, issued by the Macedonian Scientific and Literary Society

Its name, which disappeared during the period of Ottoman rule, was revived in the 19th century. Its boundaries, which have changed considerably over the time, also came to be redefined during the same period. The document was addressed to the Secretary of State for Foreign Affairs of the United Kingdom, Edward Grey, the ambassadors in the palace in London and the Minister of Foreign Affairs of the Russian Empire and was signed by Dimitrija Čupovski, Aleksandar Vezenkov, Gavril Konstantinovich and Nace Dimov. In addition, Čupovski drew a political-geographic map of Macedonia "into its natural, geographical, ethnic and economic boundaries", which was attached to the Memorandum. The document, among other things, says:

While fulfilling our holy duty to our homeland and accepting the motto "Macedonia for the Macedonians", we protest and we cannot remain indifferent when the allied Balkan states, our brothers of blood and faith are preparing to tear our homeland that is on the same cultural level like them and which in number of population is larger than Serbia and Greece separately.

== See also ==
- United Macedonia
- Macedonian nationalism
- Macedonian Question
