= Dimitrija Čupovski =

Macedonian writer and lexicographer

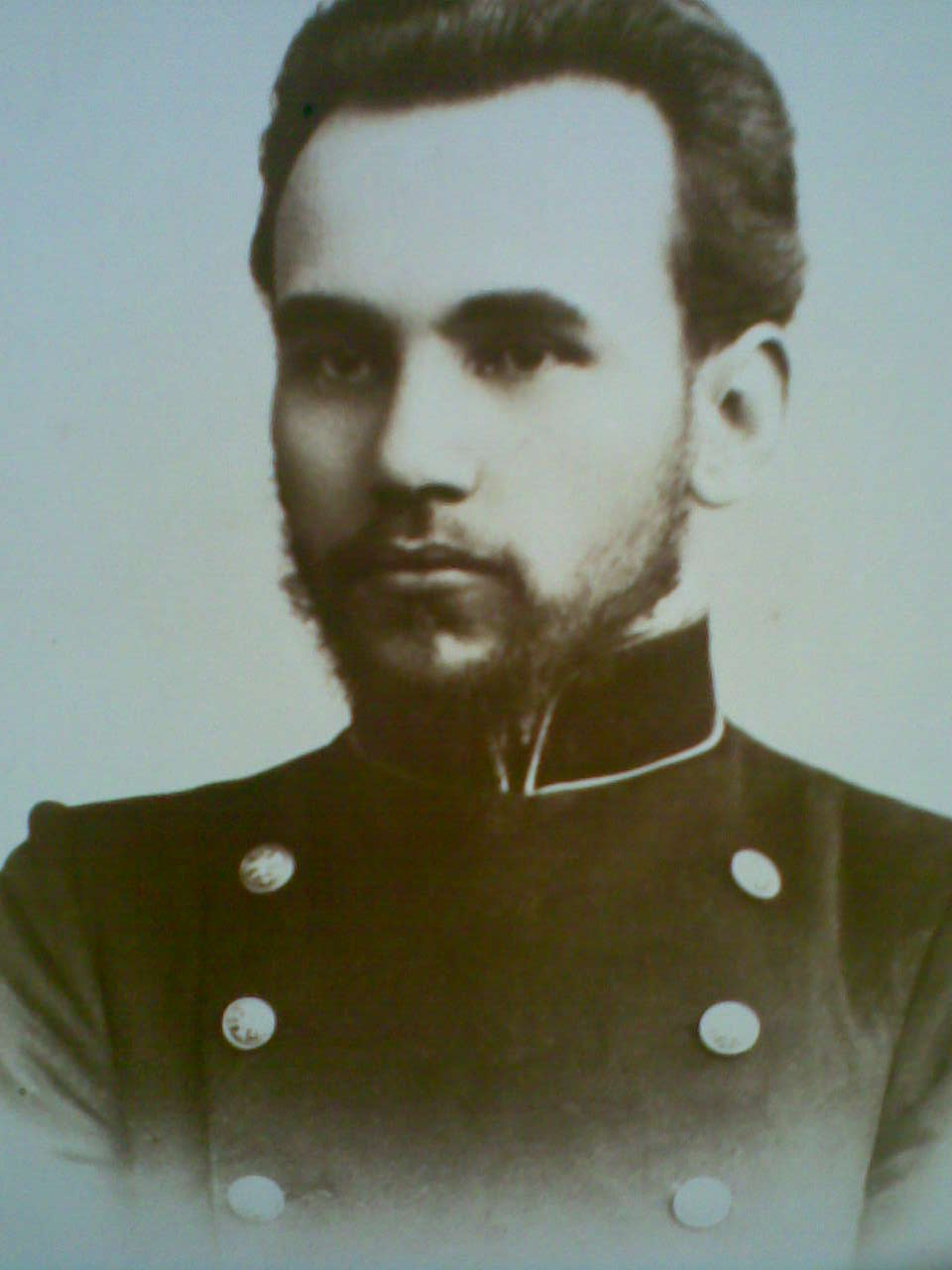
- Born: November 8, 1878; Papradište, Ottoman Empire
- Died: October 29, 1940 (aged 61); Leningrad, Soviet Union
- Occupations: Lexicographer, writer and journalist
- Relatives: Nace Dimov (brother)

Dimitrija Čupovski (Macedonian: Димитрија Чуповски; November 8, 1878 – October 29, 1940) was a Macedonian poet, writer, journalist and lexicographer. He is considered а prominent organizer and affirmer of Macedonian national thought.

== Biography ==
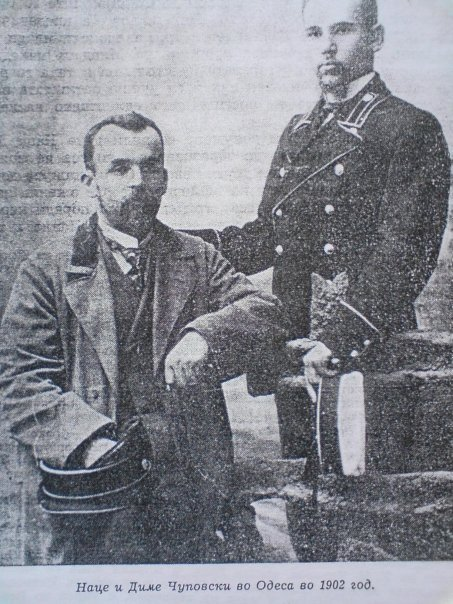
Dimitrija Čupovski and his brother Nace Dimov in Odessa in 1902.

Dimitrija Čupovski was born on November 8, 1878, in the village of Papradište in the Ottoman Empire (present-day Čaška Municipality, North Macedonia). He was born after the murder of his father, studying in his native village and Kruševo. Among his brothers were Macedonian national activist Nace Dimov and Bulgarian political figure Kuzman Chuparov. He then attended the evening school of the Lozars in Sofia in 1892 and the evening school of St. Sava in Belgrade from 1892 to 1895. In 1893, the student society Vardar was founded in Belgrade, of which he was a member, where he first began to develop his Macedonist ideas. After returning to Ottoman Macedonia, he worked as a teacher in his native village from 1895 to 1896. He continued his education at the theological seminaries in Novgorod and Simferopol from 1897 to 1900, and at Saint Petersburg State University.

Čupovski was one of the founders of the Macedonian Scientific and Literary Society, established in Saint Petersburg on October 28, 1902, and served as its president from 1903 to 1917, after Dijamandija Mišajkov. In 1905, Čupovski tried to organize for the first time a pan-Macedonian conference in Veles, where he was expelled by a local chief of IMRO Ivan Naumov, and was threatened with death for promoting Macedonian autonomy free from Bulgarian influence. Macedonian historian Blaže Ristovski wrote that it happened because of the intrigues of the local Bulgarian Metropolitan bishop and the activity of the Macedonian Bulgarian revolutionary Hristo Shaldev, who then described Čupovski as a Serbian agent. Shaldev, who lived then in St. Petersburg, described him as a person under the influence of Serbian propaganda and "the main exponent of the theory on Slavomacedonism by Professors Cvijic and Belic." Čupovski was a proponent of the movement known as Macedonism, which appeared in the 19th century, receiving some Serbian governmental support to counter Bulgarian influence in Macedonia, but the movement was marginal and had no impact on the Macedonian population.

In December 1912, he arrived in Skopje where he visited his uncle. Čupovski attempted to convince people in Skopje to send a memorandum to the Russian government for the recognition of the Macedonians as a separate people with a distinct language and to ask for the establishment of an independent Macedonian state, but he was ignored as the notables of the city identified as Bulgarians. His uncle expelled him. He attempted to spread his ideas in Veles next again but failed again. Afterwards, Čupovski left Macedonia and returned to St. Petersburg, where he initiated the sending of a memorandum to the independence of Macedonia on March 1, 1913, to the London Peace Conference, calling for the reunification of the parts of Macedonia annexed by the Balkan monarchies and for the proclamation of a Macedonian state. In the same year, he started publishing the Russian-language newspaper Macedonian Voice, where he wrote articles that emphasized Macedonians' distinctiveness and countered Bulgarian, Greek and Serbian propaganda. He sent another memorandum on June 7, 1913, to the Balkan states. After an unsuccessful attempt to return to Macedonia in 1916, Čupovski formed the Macedonian Revolutionary Committee in 1917 and authored a program for a Balkan Federative Democratic Republic. Following the October Revolution, Čupovski was forced to move with his family, spending five years in Yeysk and frequently travelling to Rostov-on-Don and Ekaterinodar before returning to Petrograd in 1923.

He was detained in 1934‒1935 and authorities revoked his right to vote, on charges of "owning a house" and selling 2/9 of it, while in 1936 they charged him as "the former owner of a bureau". He worked on articles and scientific studies, such as the Macedonian-Russian Dictionary and the study "Macedonia and the Macedonian Question". According to his son, the encyclopedic material and other works of his were destroyed during the siege of Leningrad in 1942. Per historian Alexander Maxwell, Čupovski and Krste Misirkov promoted Macedonian ethnic distinction to encourage reform in the Ottoman Empire. However, their views did not represent popular opinion in Macedonia, nor the consensus of the Macedonian diaspora. Čupovski had barely any influence during his lifetime. He died in Leningrad on October 29, 1940, aged 61. During his burial, he was covered with the flag of the Macedonian Petrograd colony from 1914. His son inscribed "A fighter for the right and freedom of the Macedonian people" on the cross of his grave.

== Legacy ==
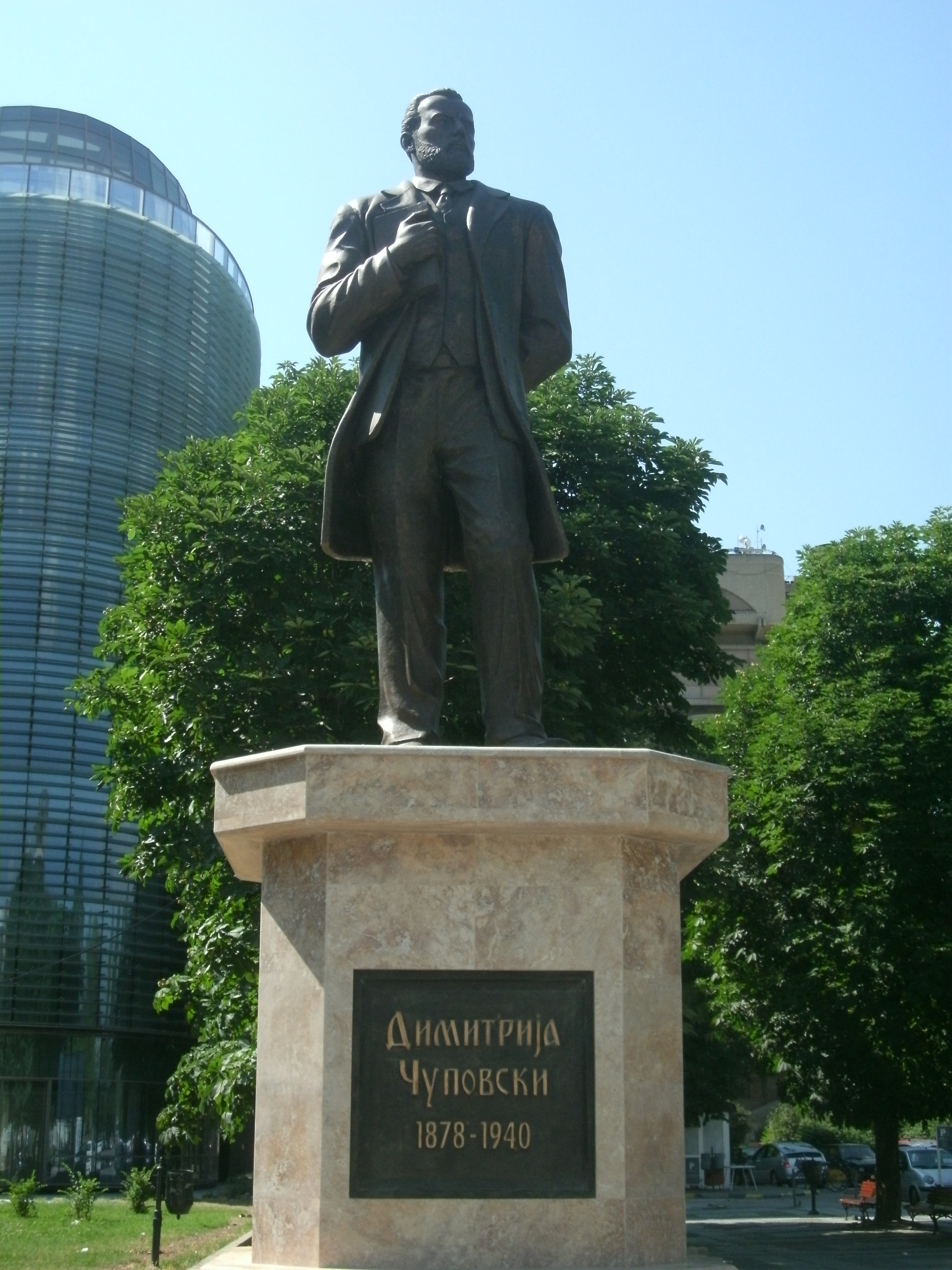
Monument of Čupovski on the Macedonia Square in Skopje.

Čupovski's work was re-discovered by Macedonian linguist Blaže Koneski in the 1960s. His remains were ceremoniously transferred to the City Cemetery in Skopje with state honors in 1990. Some Bulgarian scholars, such as Kosta Tsarnushanov, have regarded Čupovski as a marginal figure and Russian-Serbian agent in the service of the Russian Imperial Ministry of Foreign Affairs. The Macedonian historiography refers to him and Krste Misirkov as figures of significant historical importance. However, Macedonian nationalism was relatively marginal until the interwar period. In 1992, the Chemical-Technological School "Boris Kidrič" in Veles was renamed "Dimitrija Čupovski". A monument dedicated to Čupovski was placed at Macedonia Square in Skopje in 2011 and a central street in the city bears his name.
