= Dijamandija Mišajkov =

Macedonian journalist (1872–1953)

- Дијамандија Мишајков
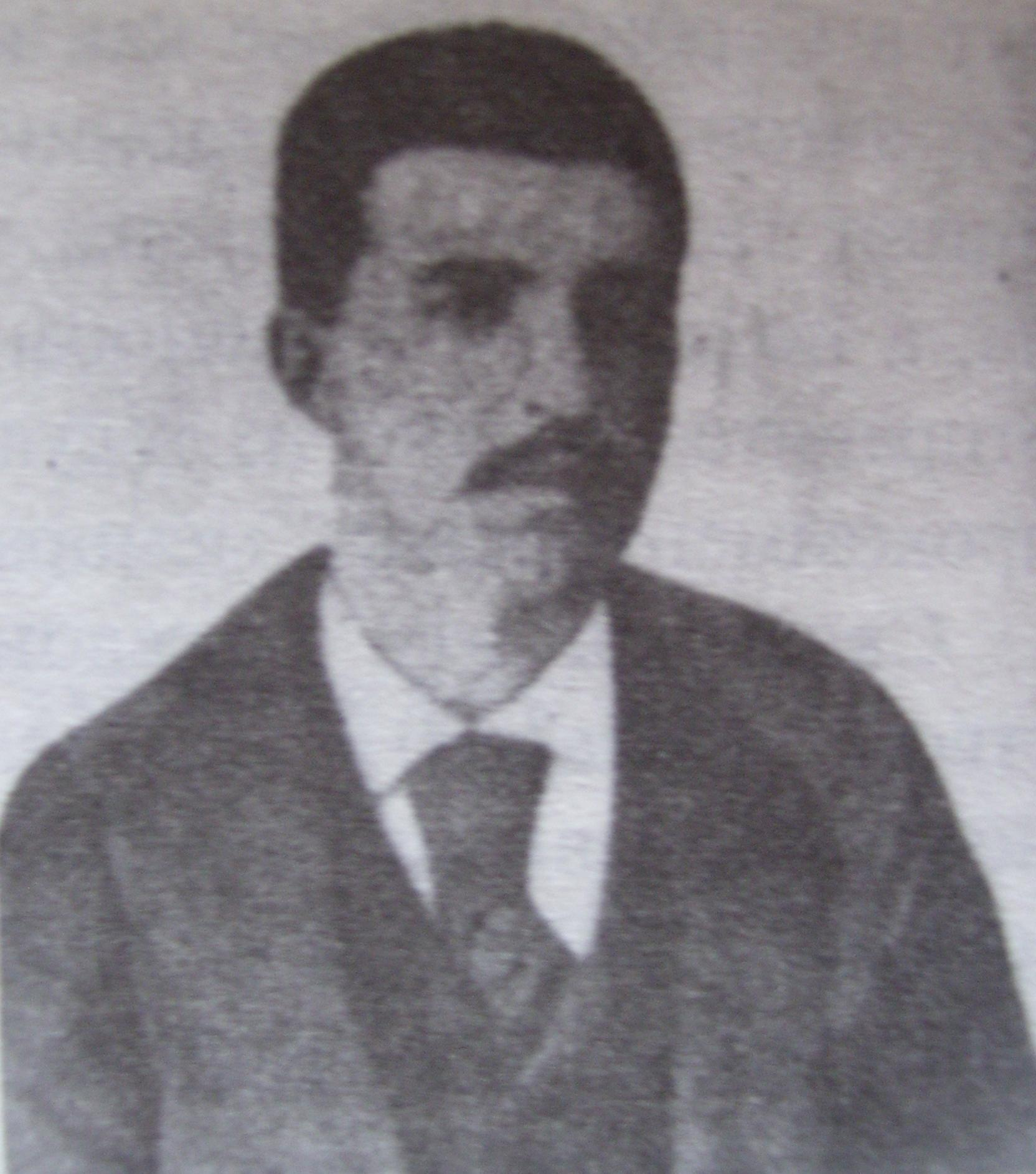
- Born: 15 March 1872; Bitola, Ottoman Empire
- Died: 6 April 1953 (aged 81); Sofia, People's Republic of Bulgaria
- Occupation(s): Teacher, journalist, lawyer

Dijamandija Mišajkov (Macedonian: Дијамандија Мишајков, romanized: Dijamandija Mišajkov; Bulgarian: Диамандия Мишайков, romanized: Diamandiya Mishaykov; 15 March 1872 – 6 April 1953) was a Macedonian journalist and a proponent of Macedonian nationalism, advocating for a distinct Macedonian nation and language.

== Biography ==
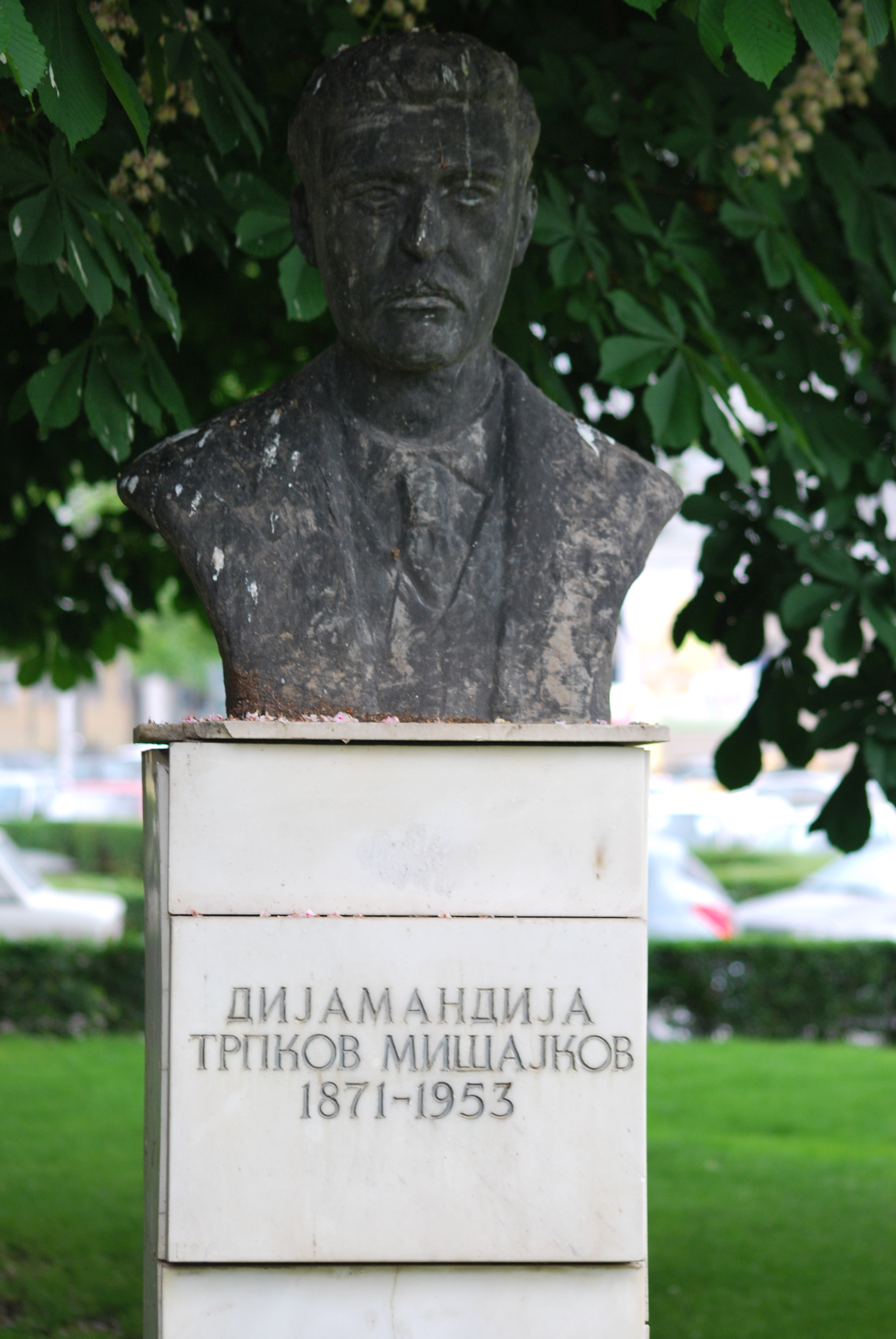
Bust of Mišajkov in Bitola.

Mišajkov was born in Bitola, then in the Ottoman Empire (now North Macedonia). He received his education there, as well as in Plovdiv and Kyustendil, before working as a teacher in Chepelare. Later he went to Belgrade, where he studied at the Faculty of Law, completing his education in 1902. Тhere he also, along with Stefan Dedov, founded the "Macedonian club", and published the newspaper Balkanski glasnik (Balkan herald) in French and Serbian. He was its editor. The newspaper expressed ideas of an independent Macedonian state, nation, and language. Later the Serbian government banned the club and the newspaper.

In October 1902, he went to Saint Petersburg together with Dedov and became one of the founders of Macedonian Scientific and Literary Society, serving as its first temporary president. Along with Dedov, the next month, he sent a memorandum to the Russian government calling for Macedonian autonomy, recognition of Macedonian Slavs as a distinct ethnic group and a distinct Macedonian Slavic language, as well as an independent church, among other things.

Mišajkov returned to Bitola in 1903 in order to try to spread the Macedonian national dogma. However, he failed and in 1907 he moved to Bulgaria. There he started working as a lawyer.

During the Second World War, Mišajkov and his family were evacuated to Svoge, where he helped the resistance. He died in 1953 in Sofia.

His brother Evgeni was a prominent clergyman in the Bulgarian Exarchate, and his other brother Vasil, was the chief prosecutor of the Supreme Court of Cassation of Bulgaria.
