= Macedonian Scientific and Literary Society =

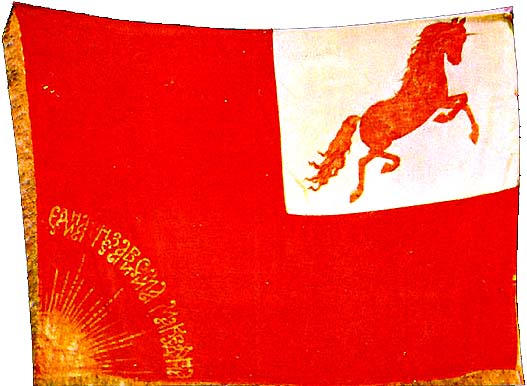
The organization's flag, published in the Russian newspaper "Makedonskiy Golos" in 1914.

The Macedonian Scientific and Literary Society, also called Slavic-Macedonian Scholarly and Literary Society, was an organization of Macedonian Slavs in Russia in the first decades of the twentieth century.

== Activity ==
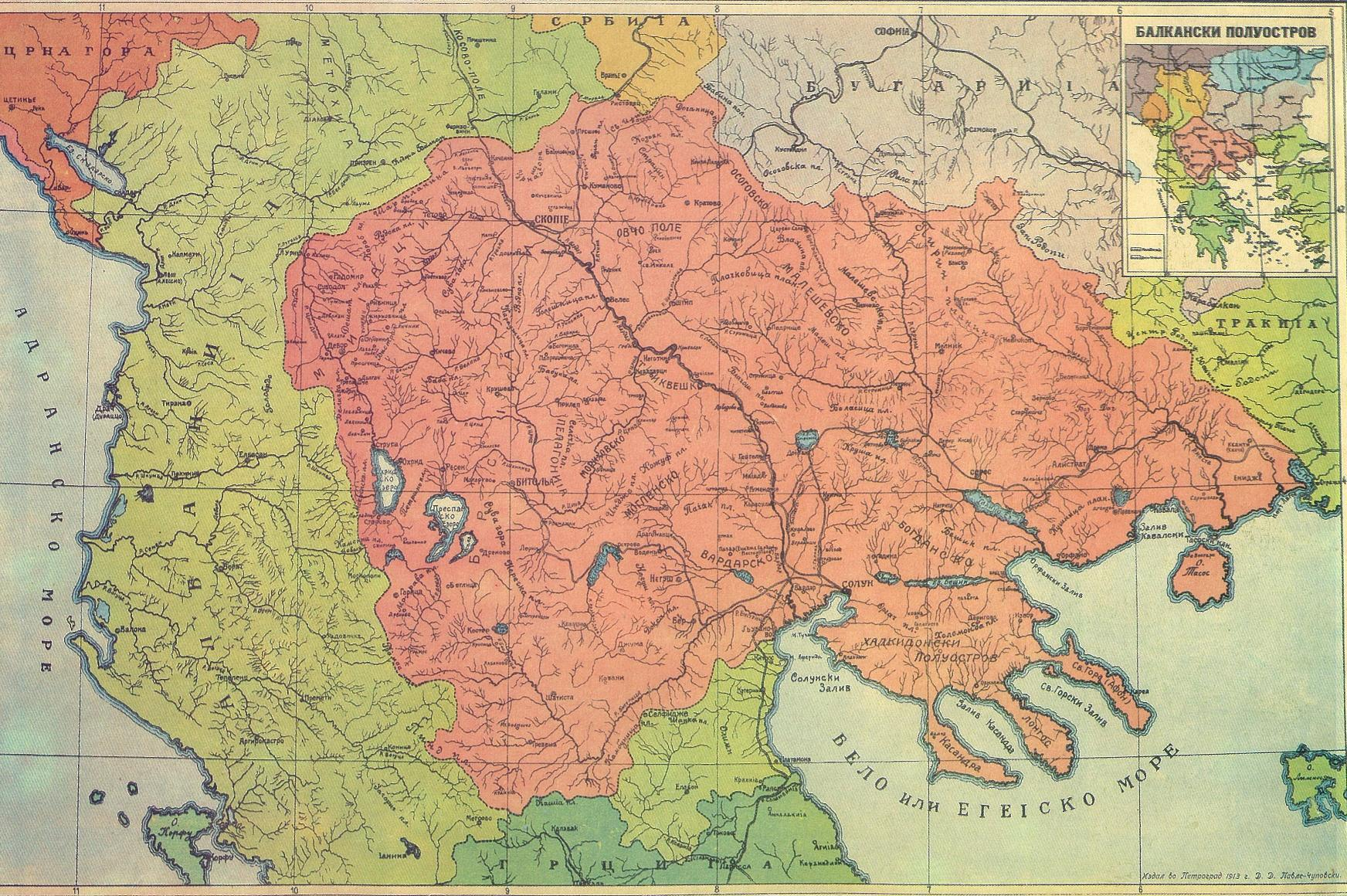
Map of Macedonia from a publication in the newspaper "Makedonski Golos", issued by the Macedonian Scientific and Literary Society, the map was part of the Memorandum of Independence of Macedonia in 1913.

It was established in Saint Petersburg on 28 October 1902. The organization's establishment was endorsed by several influential Slavophile figures, including political and religious leaders. Its founders were Dimitrija Čupovski and his brother Nace Dimov. Other founders include Stefan Dedov, Dijamandija Mišajkov and Krste Misirkov. Čupovski served as the organization's president. The organization's secretary was Milan Stoilov, a medical student in Saint Petersburg, until his death in 1903. Risto Rusulenčič, another founding member, served as its librarian. The Charitable Slav Society in Saint Petersburg sponsored the organization.

As part of its scholarly and literary activities, the society supported the introduction of Macedonian as its official language. Its aim was the creation of an independent Macedonia, encompassing the entire geographic region of Macedonia, according to maps drawn by the society itself.

By April 1903, its members reached 25, but only the names of 19 founders are known. In 1905 the Society published Vardar, the first scholarly, scientific and literary journal in the central dialects of Macedonia, which later would contribute in the standardization of Macedonian.

Towards the end of 1905, the society was dissolved, and from 1912 it reappeared. On March 1, 1913, the Society composed a Memorandum of Independence of Macedonia, which insisted on the independence of the region of Macedonia. The same year it produced the first ethnic and geographic map of Macedonia. In addition, it published the journal "Makedonskiy Golos" (Macedonian Voice) in Russian. Its activity ended in 1917 with the October Revolution in Russia.

This scholarly institution with its literary and national cultural activity is considered the foundation upon which the history of the modern Macedonian Academy of Arts and Sciences was built upon.

== See also ==
- Macedonian nationalism
- On Macedonian Matters
- Memorandum of Independence of Macedonia (1913)
