= Dědová =

- Municipality
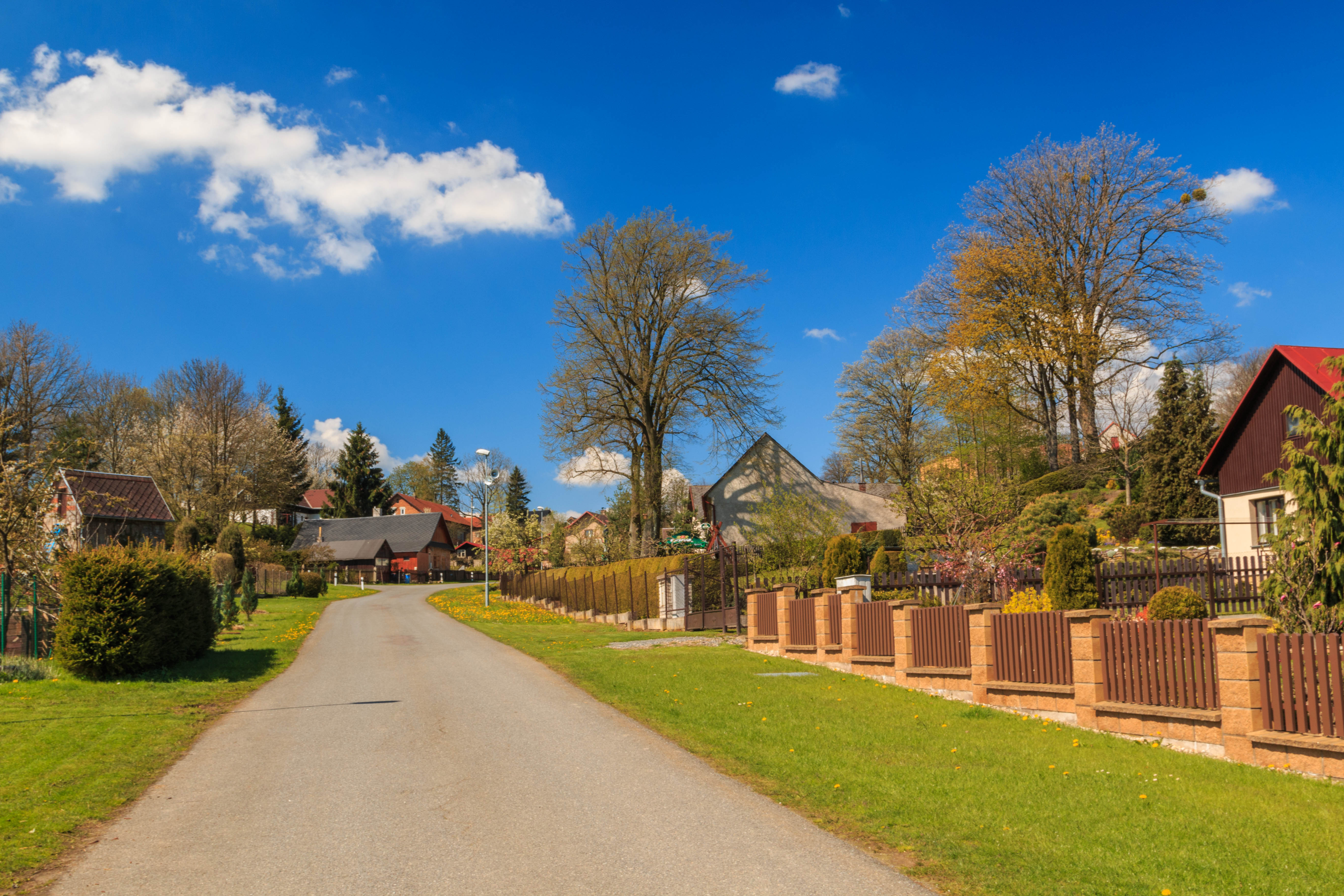
- A street in Dědová

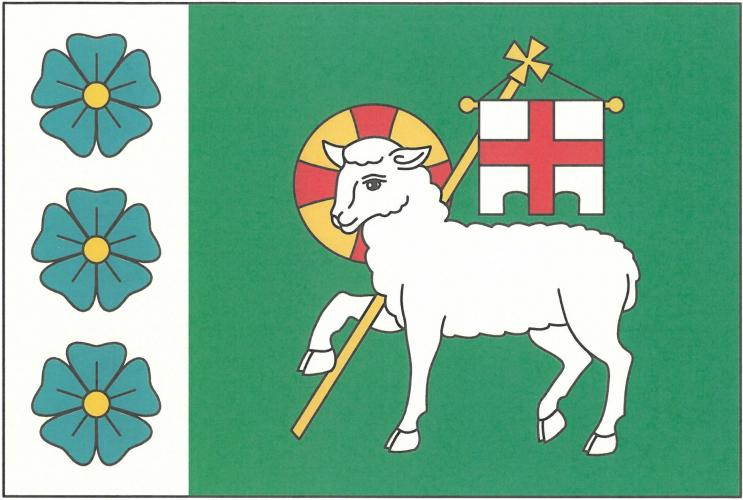
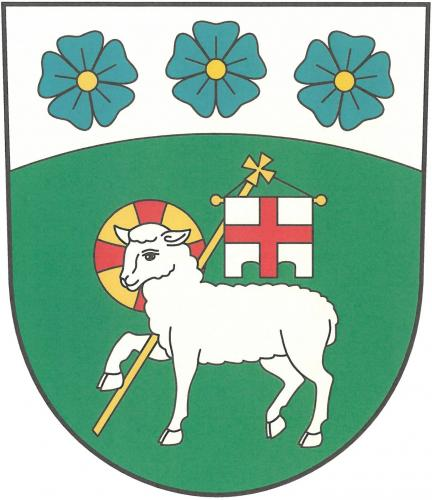
- Flag Coat of arms

- Location in the Czech Republic
- Coordinates: 49°45′40″N 15°59′11″E
- Country: Czech Republic
- Region: Pardubice
- District: Chrudim
- First mentioned: 1392

Area
  - Total: 3.90 km^{2} (1.51 sq mi)
- Elevation: 658 m (2,159 ft)

Population (2026-01-01)
  - Total: 133
  - Density: 34.1/km^{2} (88.3/sq mi)
- Time zone: UTC+1 (CET)
  - Summer (DST): UTC+2 (CEST)
- Postal code: 539 01
- Website: web.dedova.cz

Dědová is a municipality and village in Chrudim District in the Pardubice Region of the Czech Republic. It has about 100 inhabitants.

== Demographics ==
Historical population
| Year | Pop. | ±% |
|---|---|---|
| 1869 | 544 | — |
| 1880 | 531 | −2.4% |
| 1890 | 489 | −7.9% |
| 1900 | 481 | −1.6% |
| 1910 | 482 | +0.2% |
| 1921 | 440 | −8.7% |
| 1930 | 430 | −2.3% |
| 1950 | 331 | −23.0% |
| 1961 | 313 | −5.4% |
| 1970 | 253 | −19.2% |
| 1980 | 211 | −16.6% |
| 1991 | 173 | −18.0% |
| 2001 | 168 | −2.9% |
| 2011 | 149 | −11.3% |
| 2021 | 132 | −11.4% |
Source: Censuses
