= Stefan Dedov =

Journalist and writer (1869–1914)

- Стефан Дедов
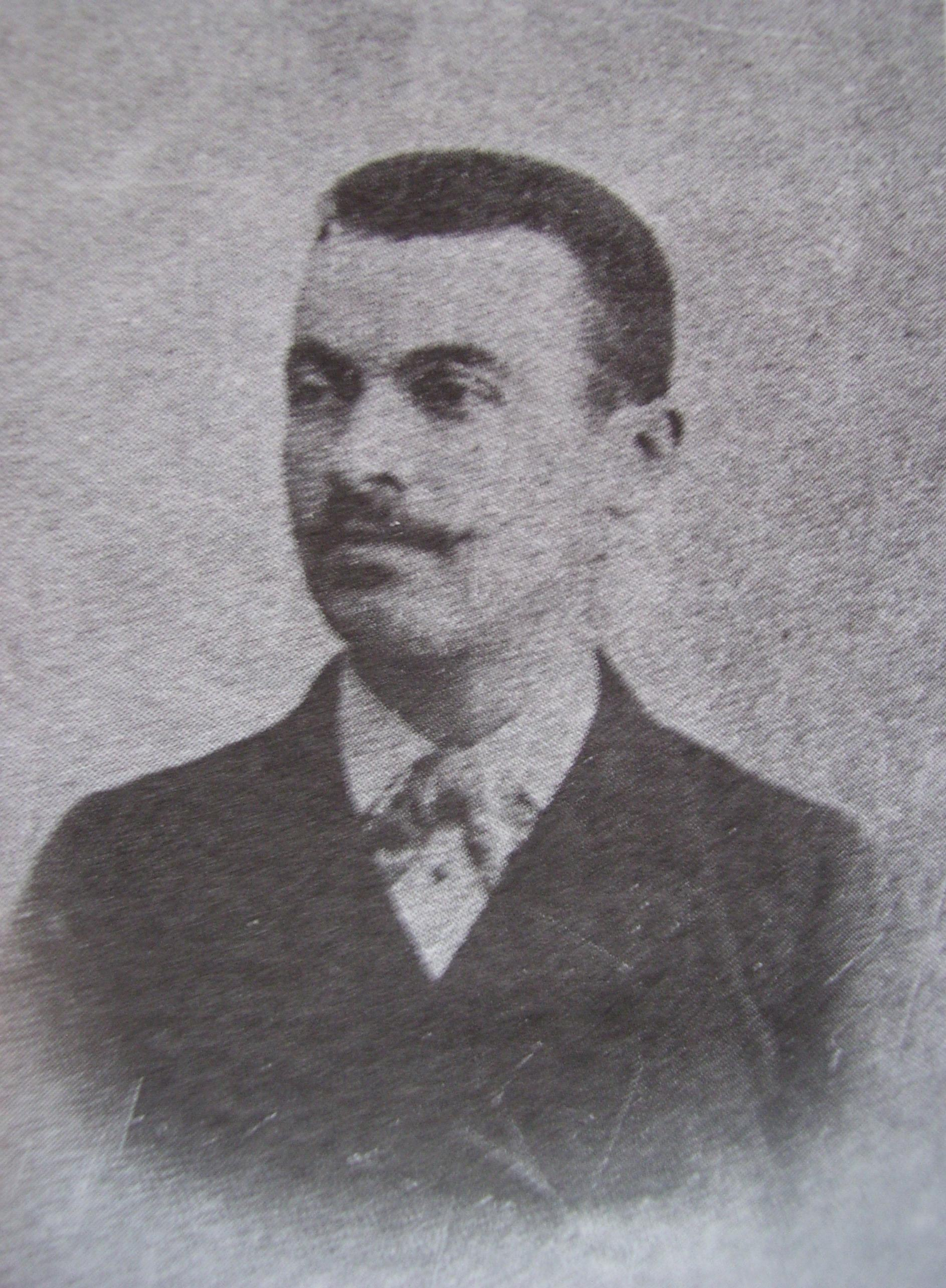
- Born: Stefan Jakimov Dedov; 28 October 1869; Ohrid, Ottoman Empire
- Died: 19 September 1914 (aged 44); Sofia, Kingdom of Bulgaria
- Cause of death: Murder
- Citizenship: Ottoman/Bulgarian

Stefan Jakimov Dedov (Macedonian: Стефан Јакимов Дедов; Bulgarian: Стефан Якимов Дедов, romanized: Stefan Yakimov Dedov; 28 October 1869 – 19 September 1914) was a journalist, writer and early proponent of the Macedonian Slavs' ethnonational distinctiveness. He publicly expressed the idea of a Macedonian nation distinct from the Bulgarians, as well as a separate Macedonian language. He also self-identified occasionally as a Bulgarian.

== Biography ==
Dedov was born in 1869 in Ohrid in the Ottoman Empire (now North Macedonia). He worked as a teacher there prior to working as a postal worker in Berkovitsa and Ruse, Bulgaria. In 1898, he moved to Belgrade, where he began studying at the Faculty of Law (1898–1902). Тhere he, along with Dijamandija Mišajkov, founded the "Macedonian club", and published the newspaper Balkanski glasnik (Balkan Herald) in French and Serbian. The newspaper expressed the idea for an independent Macedonian state, nation and language. Later the Serbian government banned the club and suppressed the newspaper.

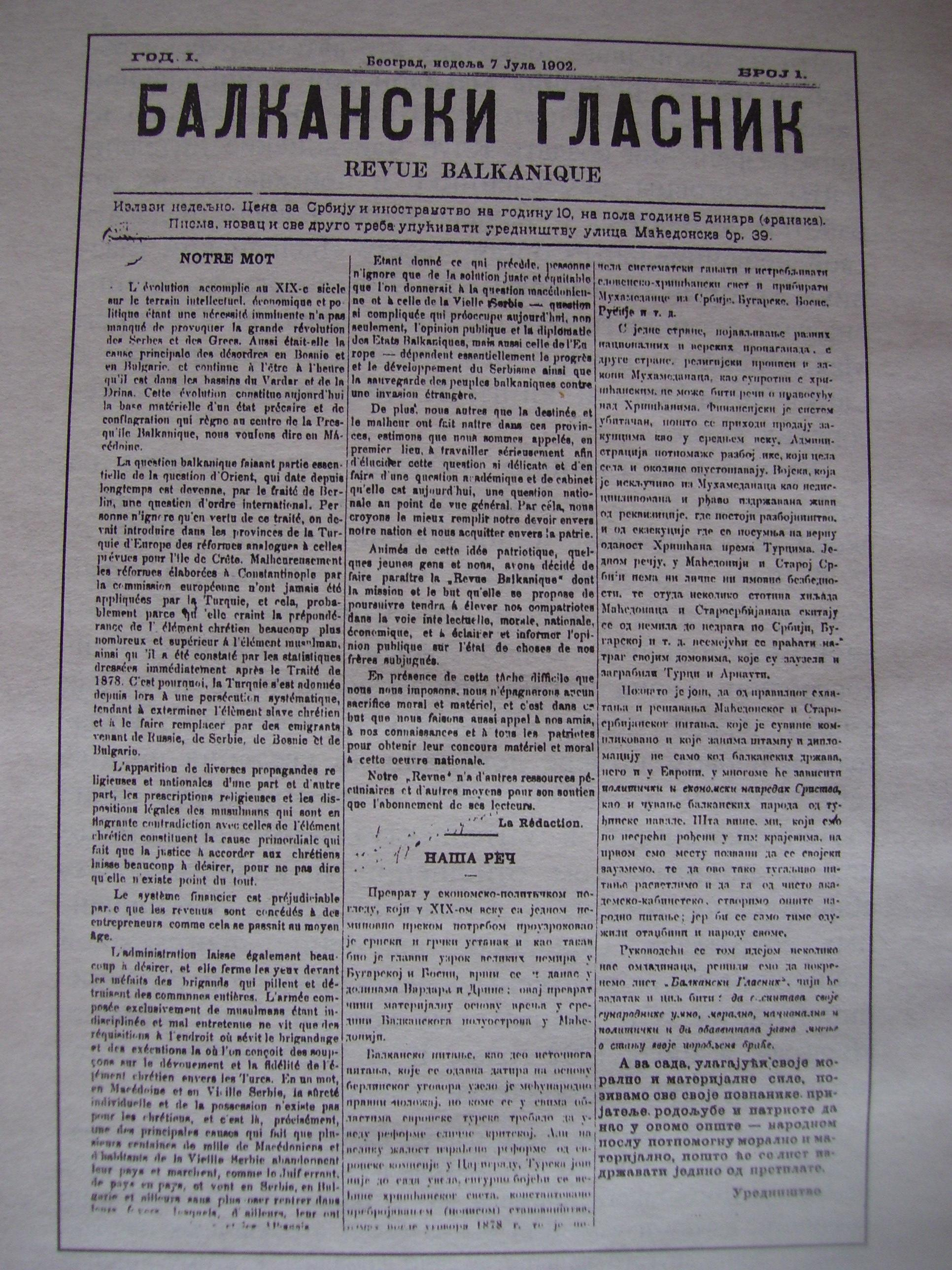
First published issue of the newspaper Balkanski Glasnik, 7 July 1902.

In 1902, he went to Saint Petersburg together with Mišajkov and became one of the founders of Macedonian Scientific and Literary Society in October. Along with Mišajkov, the next month, he sent a memorandum to the Russian government calling for Macedonian autonomy, recognition of Macedonian Slavs as a distinct ethnic group and a distinct Macedonian Slavic language, as well as an independent church, among other things.

Dedov went to Sofia in 1903 and published the newspaper Balkan. There he espoused pro-Bulgarian views in his publications. However he also aided Krste Petkov Misirkov in the printing of On Macedonian Matters and created a branch of the Macedonian Scientific and Literary Society with him on 23 November, but it was disbanded by the Bulgarian police after two days.

In 1904 he published the newspaper Kurier (Courier). He was a contributor for the Den (Day) and Balkanski Kurier (Balkan Courier) newspapers, mostly under the pseudonym Ridski or R. Dedov cooperated with some Internal Macedonian Revolutionary Organization activists, though he was suspected of being a pro-Serbian activist by the organization. He was killed in 1914 by an associate of Todor Aleksandrov - Slave Ivanov. Reporting on his death, the Belgrade newspaper Politika described him as an "honorary Serbian commercial agent".

His son, Evtim Dedov was a prominent Bulgarian sports journalist, director of the Levski sports newspaper and general secretary of the "Levski" Sport Club.
