= Macedonian Voice (1913–1914) =

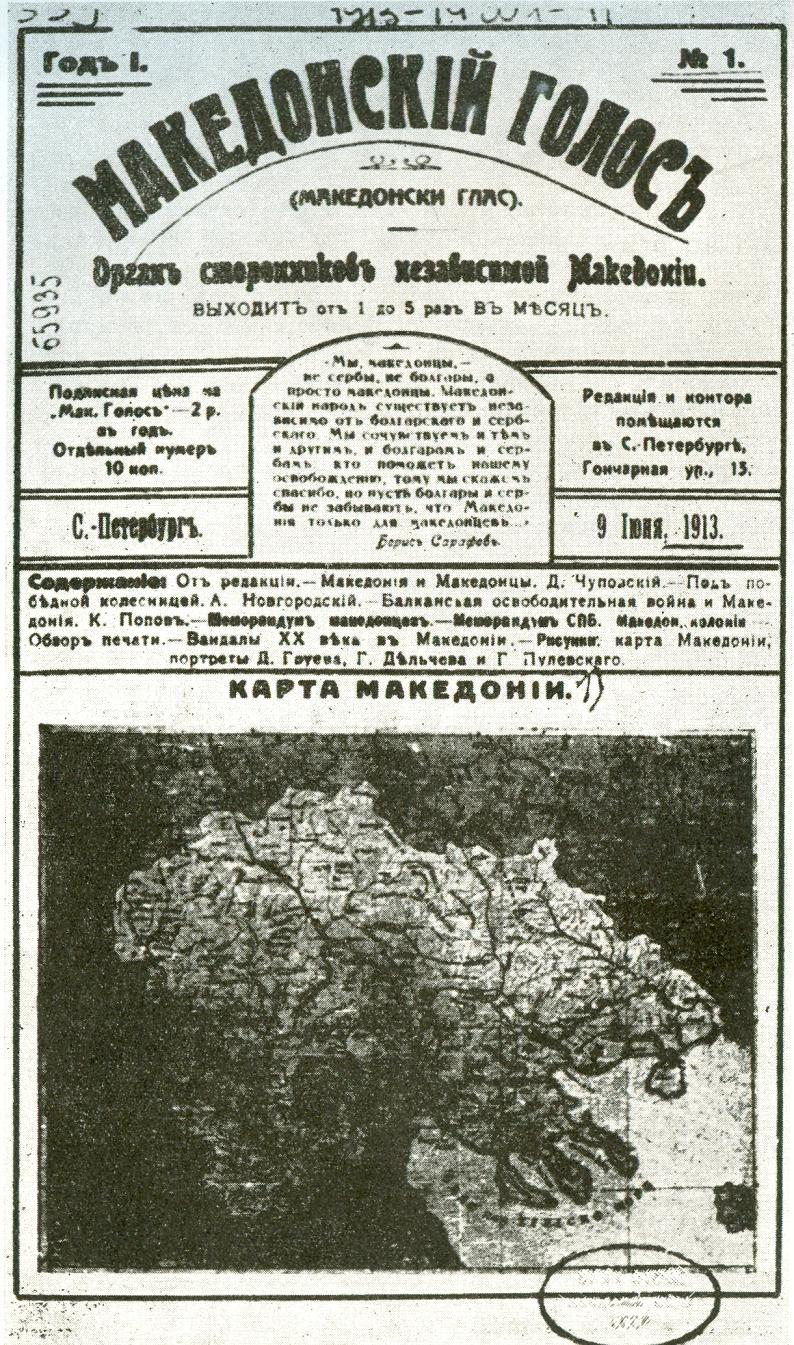
- The front page of the first edition of the Macedonian Voice. (Note: Under the title of the newspaper's front page, a quote from Boris Sarafov is present: "We Macedonians are neither Serbs nor Bulgarians, but simply Macedonians. The Macedonian people exist independently from the Bulgarian and Serbian people. We sympathize with both, Bulgarians and Serbs: whoever helps our liberation, we will say thank you to him, but the Bulgarians and Serbs should not forget that Macedonia is only for the Macedonians.")
- Publisher: Macedonian Scientific and Literary Society
- Editor-in-chief: Dimitrija Čupovski
- Founded: June 9, 1913
- Ceased publication: November 20, 1914
- Language: Russian
- City: Saint Petersburg
- Country: Russian Empire

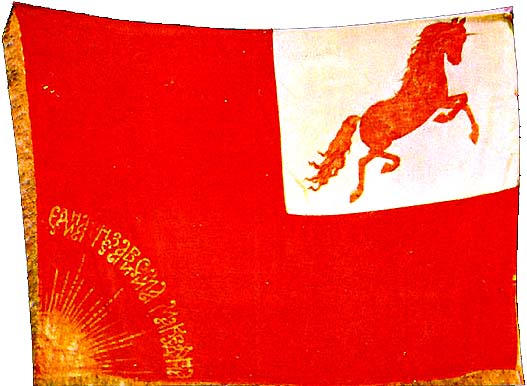
Flag design idea by Macedonian Voice for an independent Macedonia featured on the 2nd page in its 9th edition on March 2, 1914. (Note: The flag titled as Macedonian Flag (Македоноское знамя) featured in the newspaper has the red horse in the left top corner and a sun in the right bottom corner over which is written "One Independent Macedonia" (Единя Независніиа Македониіа).)

Macedonian Voice (Russian: Македонский голос, spelled in the pre-reformed Russian orthography: Македонскій Голосъ, Macedonian: Македонски глас) was a newspaper that was published in Saint Petersburg between 1913 and 1914 by the Macedonian Scientific and Literary Society. The issues of the newspaper were published monthly in Russian.

== Background ==
The newspaper was published in the period of the Balkan Wars, thus its content was a reflection of the social and political context of that time. Its intent was to generate discussion on the Macedonian Question and to put it on the agenda in the Russian Empire, as well as abroad. Before the newspaper was created, a number of Bulgarian language newspapers and societies of the same name were founded in the region of Macedonia, Bulgaria and the United States by Macedonian Bulgarians.

== Content ==
The newspaper was published in eleven editions. The editor in all the editions was Dimitrija Čupovski. The newspaper was a bulletin of a group of Slav Macedonian students in Russia, and it promoted the notion of a separate Macedonian people as distinct from the Greeks, Bulgarians and Serbs. Some of its articles were written by Krste Misirkov.

The newspaper opposed the division of Macedonia between Bulgaria, Greece, Serbia and Albania, as a result of the Bucharest treaty in 1913. The editors were struggling to popularize the idea for an independent Macedonian state as is shown on the front page of the first edition published on June 9, 1913. They also demanded the re-establishment of the Archbishopric of Ohrid.
