= Historiography of North Macedonia =

Methodology of historical studies used in North Macedonia

The first Slavic Macedonian General History by Gjorgjija Pulevski, largely completed by 1893.

Historiography in North Macedonia is the methodology of historical studies developed and employed by Macedonian historians. It traces its origins to the 1940s, when SR Macedonia became part of Yugoslavia.

Although references to ethnic Macedonians do not appear in primary sources before 1870, the first generation of Macedonian historians after WWII traced Macedonian ethnogenesis to the early 19th century. However, after the Tito-Stalin split the relations between Yugoslavia and Bulgaria deteriorated, and Bulgaria vigorously began to deny the existence of a Macedonian nation and language which it had recognised in 1946. Thus an important break occurred and Macedonian historians traced the origins of a Macedonian nation and state further back in time, to the Samuel of Bulgaria and his Cometopuli dynasty medieval rule, which was appropriated as Macedonian rather than Bulgarian. After the Republic of Macedonia's independence from Yugoslavia and after the beginning of the Macedonia name dispute with Greece, Macedonian historiography carried the nation's origins back even earlier, to antiquity and to the ancient kingdom of Macedon with a particular emphasis on Alexander the Great.

In the field of historiography, communism and Macedonian nationalism are closely related. After the fall of communism, Macedonian historiography did not significantly revise its communist past, because of the key role played by communist policies in establishing a distinct Macedonian nation. The debates in North Macedonia concerning its relationships with Bulgaria and Greece have had significant impact on historiographic narrative in the country, introducing a new revisionist interpretation of the past. Macedonian historians consider as one of their main purposes is to assort the facts free from foreign manipulation and the alleged twisted views of the neighboring historiographies, and present them in a true light. Thus, Macedonian historians with the same principle as their colleagues in Bulgaria, Greece, and Serbia, make extreme efforts to present the Slavic Orthodox population of the region in the 19th and 20th century as Macedonian, regardless of what the written records say.

Via the medium of education, unsubstantiated historical claims have been transmitted to generations of students in the country, to conceal that many prominent Macedonians had viewed themselves as Bulgarians. The Skopje 2014 project, for example, promoted the idea of continuity of the Macedonian nation from antiquity until modern times. Some domestic and foreign scholars have criticized this agenda of negationist historiography, whose apparent goal is to affirm the continuous existence of a separate Macedonian nation throughout history. Diverging approaches are discouraged because of economic limitations, and researchers who express alternative views risk academic career obstacles and stigmatization as "national traitors". Typical for young historiographies like the Macedonian is to be obsessed with questions of the nation, since the formation of the national past is among the first rationales of modern historiography.

== History ==
=== Pre-independence ===
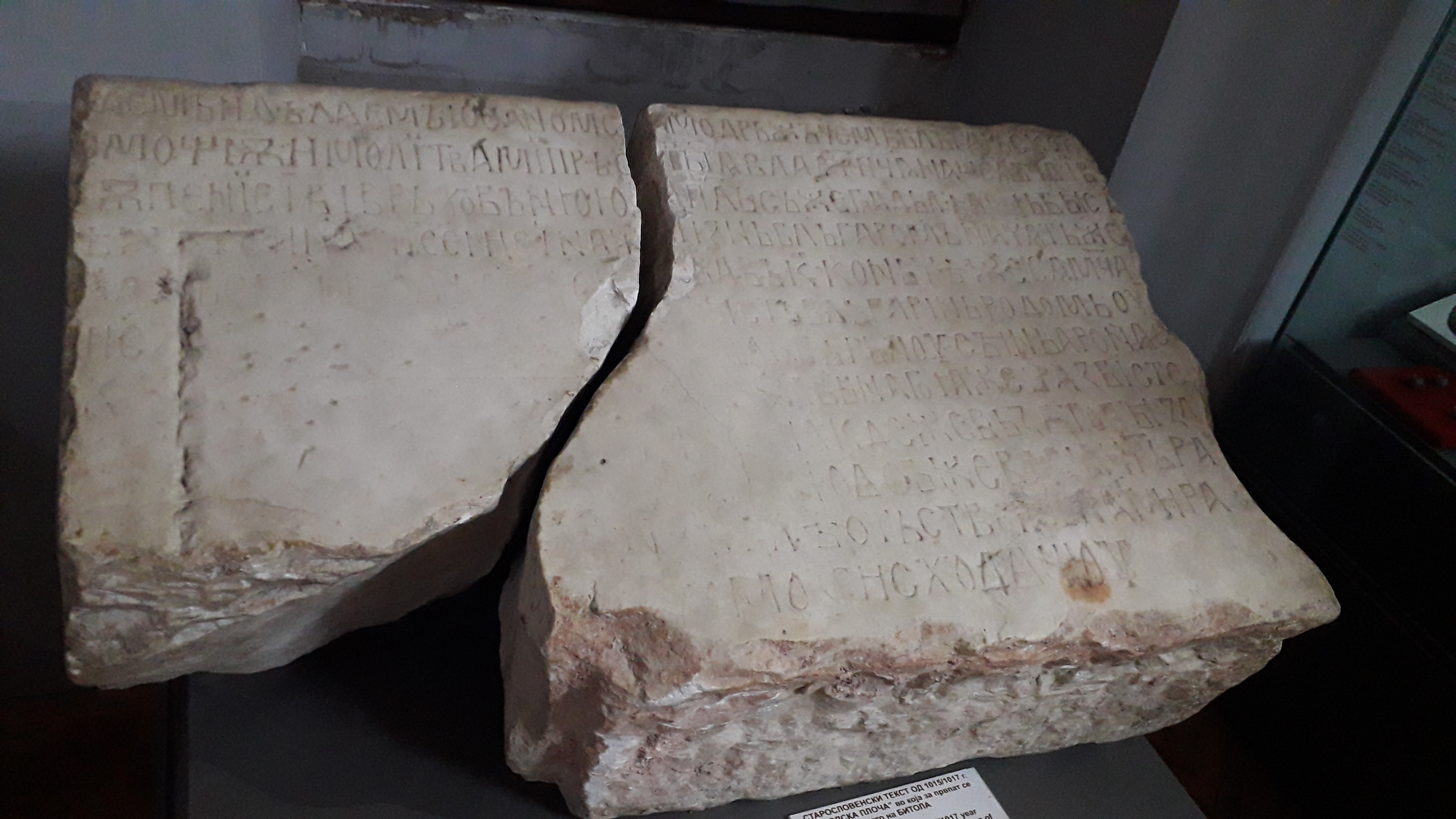
The Bitola inscription from 1016/1017. Originally exhibited in the local museum, it was locked away when Bulgarian scientists became aware of its content, confirming the Cometopuli considered their state Bulgarian.

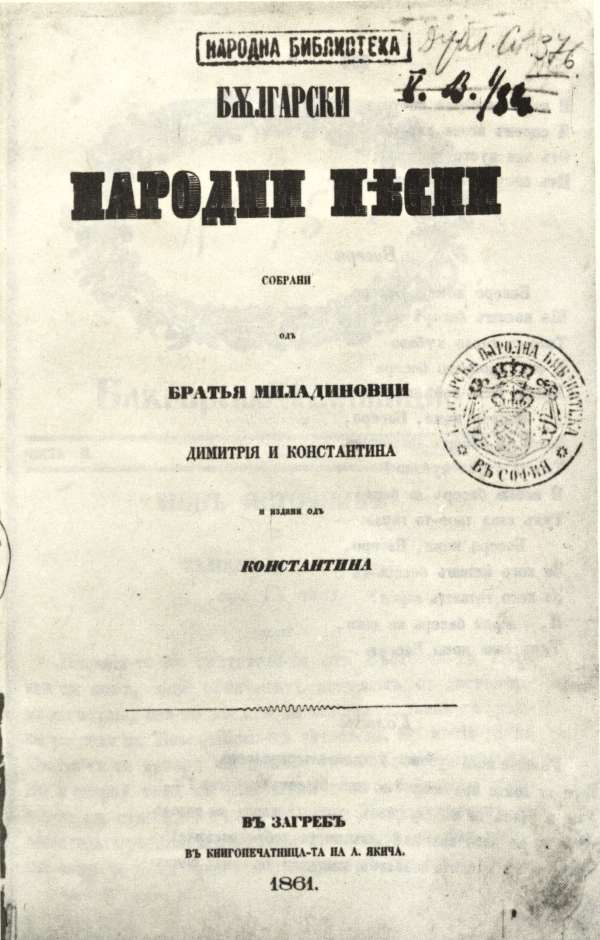
Front cover of the Bulgarian Folk Songs collected by the Miladinov Brothers and published in 1861. In the early 2000s the Macedonian State Archive displayed a photocopy of the book, but with the upper part showing the word "Bulgarian" being cut off.

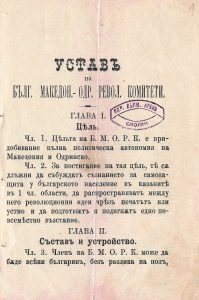
The statute of the turn of the 20th century Bulgarian Macedonian-Adrianople Revolutionary Committees (later IMARO/IMRO). Its membership then was allowed only for Bulgarians. It was discovered by Ivan Katardžiev in Skopje, but its authenticity has been disputed by most Macedonian historians.

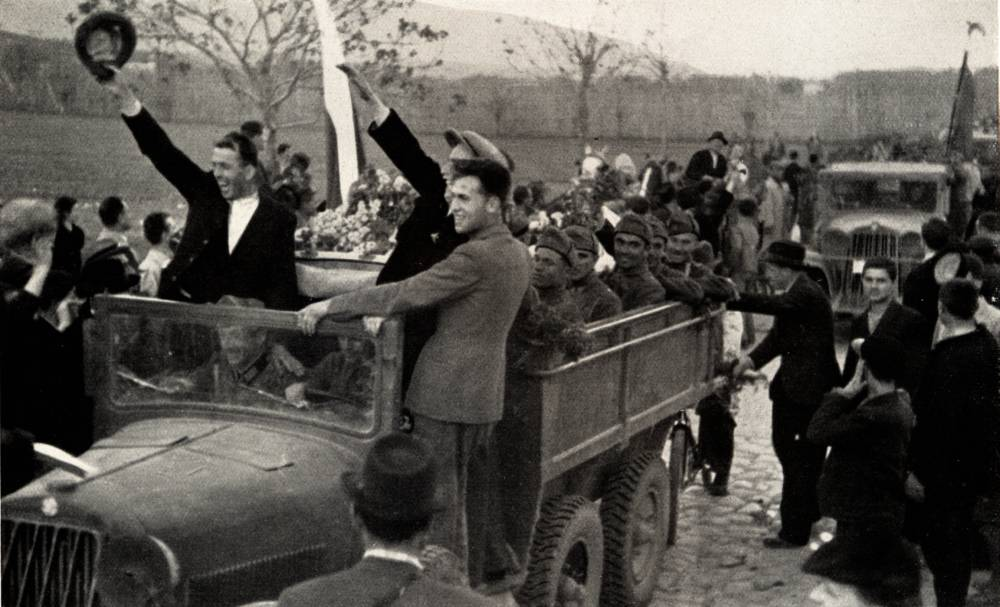
Bulgarian invasion in Vardar Banovina, April 1941. Bulgarians were greeted as liberators as an effect from the previous oppressive Serbian rule. In many places celebrations were organized by the Bulgarian Action Committees. The local communists then joined the BCP and refused any military actions against the Bulgarians in the beginning. However, after the initial phase, the Bulgarian regime launched an oppressive Bulgarisation campaign, with whom they turned the population strongly against them, and the communist resistance grew as well. After the war, the Yugoslav communist historiography did a lot to equate the term Bulgarian with fascist occupier.

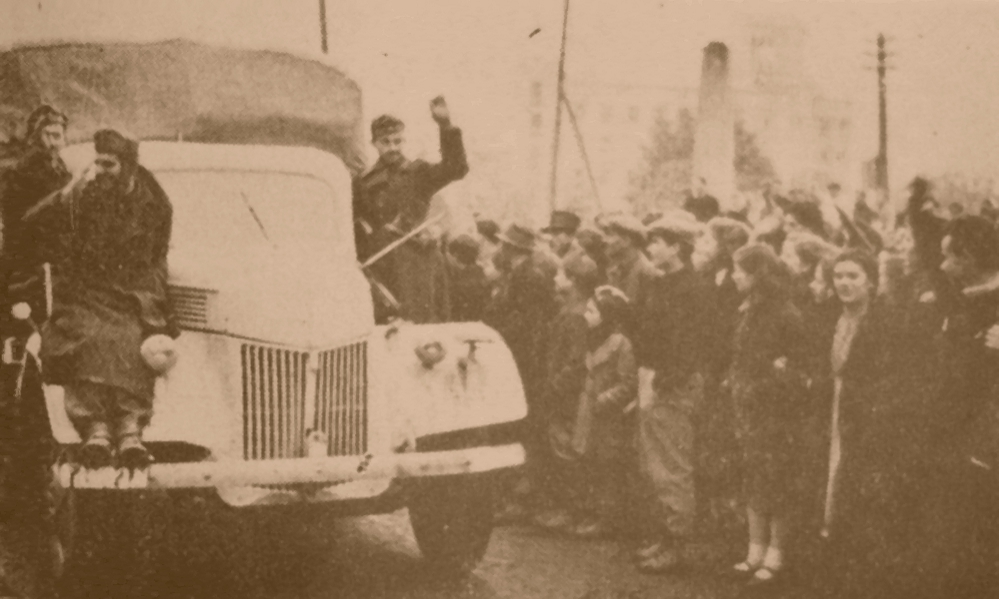
Bulgarian forces after switching sides in the war, entering Skopje in November 1944 after they ejected the Germans from the city. Macedonian sources claim no Bulgarian troops participated in the capture of the city, even as observers. Bulgarian sources maintain they seized the town.

By 1893, Gjorgjija Pulevski, one of the first Macedonian national activists, largely completed a "General History of the Macedonian Slavs", although his knowledge of history may have been modest and largely influenced by pan-Slavism. Per him, there were different histories of the Balkan peoples then, but the Slavic Macedonians were always forgotten in them. Because of that he harshly criticized those historians who did not mention Macedonians, and stressed the necessity for the Macedonians to have their own written history, just as did other peoples. The Macedonian historical narrative is rooted in leftist and communist groups active during the Interwar period, especially in the 1930s, when the Comintern issued a special resolution in their support. According to activists from those groups, the Macedonian nation was forged through a differentiation from the earlier Bulgarian nation. In that framework, the Macedonian awakening in the 19th century took place as part of the Bulgarian National Revival, but managed to evolve separately from it in the early 20th century. One of them — Vasil Ivanovski, declared for the first time that many Bulgarian historical figures were, in fact, ethnic Macedonians. It was only after the Second World War, however, that those writings were widely appreciated, as prior to the establishment of Communist Yugoslavia, the existence of a separate Macedonian nation was still not widely recognized.

A history department was established in the University of Skopje in 1946. The first national scientific institution in this field – the Institute for National History of the PR Macedonia - was established on July 20, 1948, under the Cyril Methodius University in Skopje. It had the obligation of studying the history of the Macedonian people. The role played by the Macedonian partisans and the Communist Party of Yugoslavia was emphasised by the Yugoslav Macedonian historiography. The leader of the new Socialist Republic of Macedonia – Lazar Koliševski, initially proclaimed that the Republic's history had begun with the communist struggle during the Second World War, whereas early 20th century events such as the Ilinden Uprising, or organisations such as the IMRO, were mere Bulgarian conspiracies. At the same time, the first rector of the University of Skopje - Kiril Miljovski - admitted that early Macedonian revivalists and revolutionaries identified as Bulgarians. With explicit state support from the Yugoslav government, historical studies emphasizing the distinctness of Macedonian nationhood were expanded. New Macedonian historiography held, as a central principle, that Macedonian history was separate from Bulgarian history. Its primary goal was to foster an independent Macedonian national consciousness, with an "anti-Bulgarian" or "de-Bulgarizing" trend, and to sever any ties with Bulgaria. This distinct Slavic consciousness would inspire identification with Yugoslavia.

The first generation of Macedonian historians focused on the 19th and 20th centuries, claiming a Macedonian national awakening and distinguished it from the Bulgarian one. However, some people from the region who were included in the narrative had also played a significant role in the Bulgarian National Revival. This apparent problem was solved by the Communist system using censorship, control of historical information, and manipulation. Numerous prominent activists with pro-Bulgarian sentiment from the 19th and the early 20th centuries were described as (ethnic) Macedonians. Despite the fact that in many documents of that period, the local Slavic population was not referred to as "Macedonian", but rather as "Bulgarian", Macedonian historians argued that it was Macedonian anyway. They also claimed that the term "Bulgarian" did not refer to any specific ethnicity at the time, but was rather used as a synonym for "Slavic", "Christian" or "peasant". In 1874, the Orthodox population of the bishoprics of Skopje and Ohrid were given the chance by the Ottoman authorities to participate in a plebiscites, where they voted overwhelmingly in favour of joining the Bulgarian Exarchate (Skopje by 91%, Ohrid by 97%). However, Macedonian historians claimed that the spread of Bulgarian national feeling in Macedonia was a result of an organized propaganda which made a breakthrough with the formation of the Bulgarian Exarchate. Per Macedonian historians the Macedonian Slavs did not joined the Exarchate because they felt themselves Bulgarian, but rather because they were Slavs who opposed Greek domination. Furthermore, they claim that the Exarchate attempted to destroy the previous self-governing activity of the Greek Patriarchate church municipalities which were run by anti-Phanariot locals, to supplant their democratic electoral system by appointing like-minded people as municipal presidents, who spread Bulgarian propaganda with the help and contact of the Bulgarian Exarchate.

After the Tito-Stalin split, in the 1950s, Macedonian historians also traced the origin of the Macedonian nation further back into the Middle Ages. Croatian historian Stjepan Antoljak gave Macedonian historians the idea to claim Samuel of Bulgaria as an ethnic Macedonian ruler. Macedonian historians declared Samuel's kingdom as a Macedonian kingdom. When historians from Skopje University published in 1985 their collection of documents on the struggle of the Macedonian people, they included into the excerpts of medieval chronicles a footnote for every use of the terms "Bulgaria" and "Bulgarian". In the 1960s, Macedonian and Serbian scholars typically referred to the ancient local tribes of the Central Balkan region as Daco-Moesian. Yugoslav Macedonian historians argued that any plausible link between ethnic Macedonians and their ancient namesakes was, at best, accidental.

=== Post-independence ===
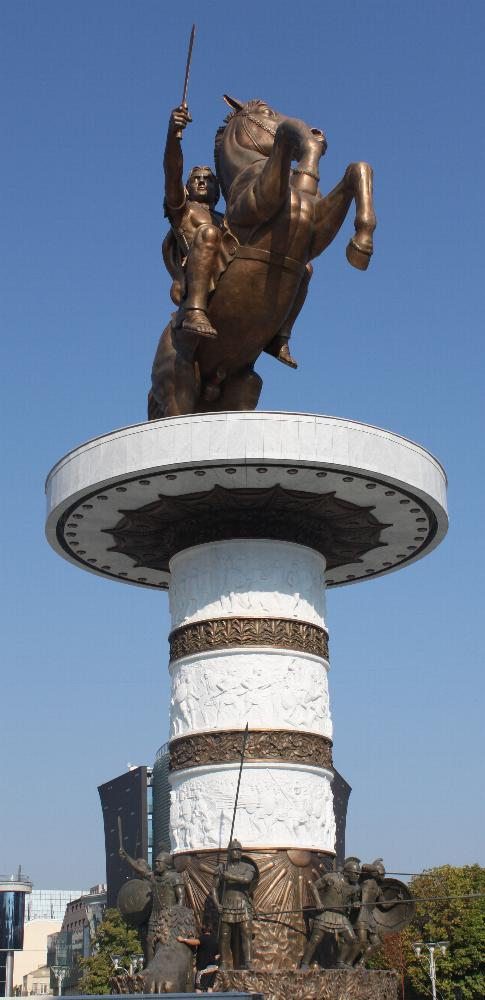
The Warrior on a Horse monument dedicated to Alexander the Great in Skopje. Greece condemned the statue as "provocative", claiming Alexander as exclusively part of its Hellenic heritage. Plaques were placed on such statues after the Prespa agreement, clarifying that they belong to the ancient Hellenic civilisation.

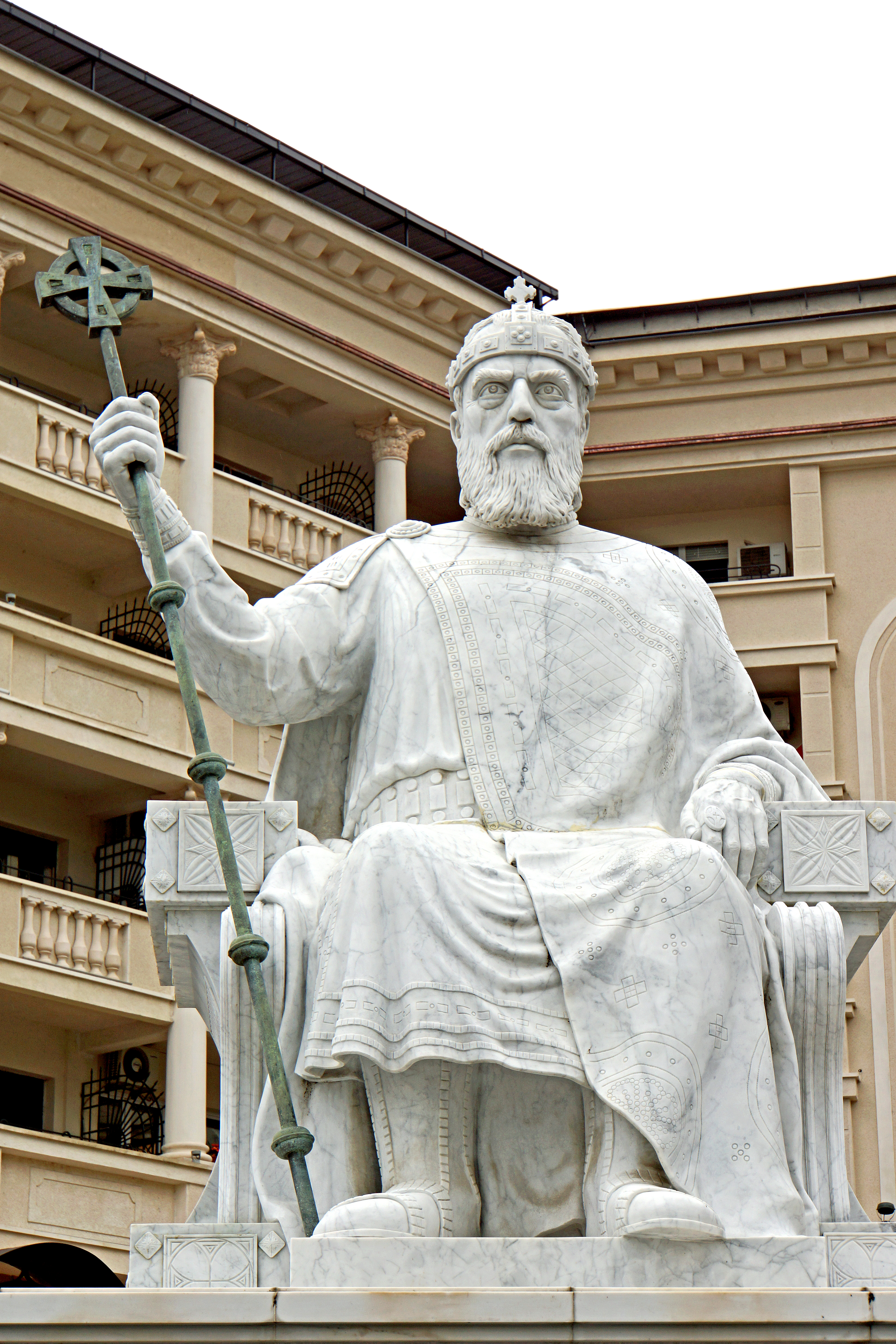
Monument of Samuel of Bulgaria in Skopje. In August 2022, the Ministry of Foreign Affairs of North Macedonia published official recommendations of the Joint Historical Commission operating between the two countries, where is offered a joint commemoration of Samuel, who was ruler of the Bulgarian empire.

The situation did not change significantly after the Republic of Macedonia achieved independence in the late 20th century. The reluctance towards a thorough reexamination of Yugoslav communist historiography was fueled by the fact that the Macedonian nation was a product of Yugoslav communist policies. The generation of Macedonian historians closely associated with the Yugoslav period, who were instrumental in establishing national myths, have been in charge of the institute, while the Institute monopolised the historiography. The main goal of the historiography has been to prove that the Macedonian nation existed. Bulgarian historians have continued to dispute the Macedonian interpretation of events. As a result of the Macedonia naming dispute and Greek opposition, there were efforts to include ancient Macedonians in the narrative. According to this new narrative, most of the cultural achievements of the ancient Macedonians were actually (ethnic) Macedonian. This new historical trend, called antiquisation, depicted the Macedonian nation as being a thousand years older. In this view, ancient Macedonians were not Greeks, and a separate existence of ancient Macedonians in the Early Middle Ages was maintained, 800 years after the fall of their kingdom, as well as their admixture in the Byzantine Empire with early Slavic settlers arriving in the late 6th century. The Macedonian Academy of Sciences and Arts (MANU) was also involved in efforts of proving that ethnic Macedonians are the descendants of ancient Macedonians.

In 2009, the first Macedonian Encyclopedia was published by MANU. The publication caused international and domestic protests because of its content, and it has been subject to criticism. Even some Macedonian academics criticised the book as hastily prepared and politically motivated. Soon thereafter, the controversial encyclopedia was withdrawn from libraries. In 2008, Macedonian Canadian historian Andrew Rossos published the first professional English language overview of the history of Macedonia. However, Stefan Troebst had suggested that his narrative was influenced by the dominant views in the Republic of Macedonia, thus reflecting the latest developments in official Macedonian historiography.

The governments of Bulgaria and Macedonia signed a friendship treaty to bolster the complicated relations between the two Balkan states in August 2017. As a provision of the treaty, a joint commission on historical and educational issues was formed in 2018. This intergovernmental commission is a forum where controversial historical issues are to be raised and discussed, to resolve problematic readings of history. In an interview given in 2019, the Macedonian co-president of the joint historical commission - Dragi Gjorgiev - indicated that it was necessary to acknowledge there had been forgeries made on the Macedonian side. An example provided was the replacement of "Bulgarian" with "Macedonian" in certain historical artifacts, seen in Macedonian textbooks. According to Gjorgiev, the historiography had been a function of the process of nation-building for many years.

In early October 2019, Bulgaria set many tough terms for North Macedonia's EU progress. The Bulgarian government accepted an ultimate "Framework Position", warning that Bulgaria would not let the EU integration of North Macedonia be accompanied by European legitimization of an anti-Bulgarian ideology. In the list, there were more than 20 demands and a timetable to fulfill them, during the process of North Macedonia's accession negotiations. It stated that the rewriting of the history of part of the Bulgarian people after 1944 was one of the pillars of the bulgarophobic agenda of then-Yugoslav communism. The "Framework Position" was approved by a parliamentary vote on 10 October. As a result, in an interview with Bulgarian media in November 2020, Macedonian Prime Minister Zoran Zaev conceded that, among other things, Bulgaria was not a fascist occupier during WWII, and had in fact joined Macedonian Partisans in battles to repel Germans from the area in 1944. This sparked criticism and accusations by Macedonian public figures, politicians and historians of historical revisionism. Protests broke out demanding Zaev's resignation. The leader of VMRO-DPMNE, Hristijan Mickoski stated that he was concerned that the negotiation process with Bulgaria could threaten Macedonian national identity. According to former Macedonian Prime Minister Ljubčo Georgievski, those reactions were the result of ignorance, hypocrisy or politicking.

On 17 November 2020, Bulgaria blocked the official start of North Macedonia's EU accession negotiations. One of the main reasons provided was an "ongoing nation-building process" based on historical negationism of Bulgarian identity, culture and legacy in the broader region of Macedonia. Per Paul Reef, the acknowledgement of Bulgarian influence on Macedonian history is highly problematic, because it clashes with the post-WWII Yugoslav Macedonian narratives, based on a profound anti-Bulgarian stance in the historiography as well. In August 2022, the joint historical commission reached an agreement and recommended the joint commemoration of historical figures like Cyril and Methodius, Clement of Ohrid, Saint Naum and Tsar Samuel. In September 2024, after he was replaced in the historical commission, Gjorgiev criticized Mickoski for accusing the historical commission of not defending national interests, stating that anyone who does not comply with these views will face disagreeable consequences. In a 2026 commentary, Gjorgiev argued that Macedonian society is afraid to confront its own historical past, out of concern that such a debate could threaten the Macedonian national identity, and that a mature nation should be able to examine the complexity of its history without seeking outside guarantees for it. In its June 2026 resolution on North Macedonia's progress towards EU accession, the European Parliament acknowledged "the existence of differing interpretations concerning the historical characteristics of Macedonian society" and underscored that its report "does not aim to prejudge or constrain scholarly discourse on these matters". In the same paragraph it condemned "any attempts to replace historical monuments and/or artefacts, including the destruction of authentic cultural heritage" and regretted "the destruction and falsification of Bulgarian inscriptions". In the next paragraph the Parliament urged the Joint Multidisciplinary Commission on Historical Issues to achieve clear results which texts should reflect the interpretation of historical facts and figures from the common history of both peoples based on evidence-based historical documents.

== Domestic and revisionist views ==
After the fall of Communism, historical revisionists in the Republic of Macedonia (now North Macedonia) questioned the narrative established in Communist Yugoslavia. Specifically revisionism came into prominence from the mid-1990s. Some revisionists include Zoran Todorovski, Stojan Kiselinovski, Violeta Ačkoska and Stojan Risteski, who have been ideologically aligned with VMRO-DPMNE, which during the reign of Ljubčo Georgievski was accused of being pro-Bulgarian by the most prominent Macedonian historians. After 1945 the Yugoslav authorities rehabilitated only certain IMRO revolutionaries, who were not associated with the idea of union of Macedonia with Bulgaria, while other IMRO figures remained neglected because of their strong pro-Bulgarian stands. Todorovski has tried to rehabilitate figures regarded as controversial pro-Bulgarians in the historiography such as Todor Aleksandrov and Ivan Mihailov. Kiselinovski on the other hand has re-evaluated the standardization of the Macedonian language and the role that Blaže Koneski played in it, who according to him Serbified it. Ačkoska and Risteski have written about the repressions against the opponents of the communist regime. Revisionist historians with anti-Yugoslav and anti-Serbian sentiments have argued the politics of SFR Yugoslavia continued the pre-war oppressive Serbian policies, thus the revisionists were legitimizing the political agenda of VMRO-DPMNE at the time. Revisionists have been labelled as Bulgarophiles by their opponents. Historian Todor Čepreganov has criticized the attempted rehabilitation of such figures like Aleksandrov as politically motivated in order to cause greater controversies and divisions. Also, Čepreganov explained that almost all Macedonian revolutionaries sometimes took pro-Bulgarian stands or identified as Bulgarians, but noted the absence of a Macedonian state at the time and the strong influences of neighboring countries. Many people were then educated in Bulgarian Exarchate schools. Similar views were espoused by Ivan Katardžiev.

People such as Ivan Mikulčić, Krste Crvenkovski and Slavko Milosavlevski challenged the popular historical myths in the Republic of Macedonia. According to Irena Stefoska, such a reading of history contributes to the distortion of Macedonian national identity, and does harm to the academic integrity of history as a discipline. Mikulčić, for example, proved through archaeological evidence that there were no ancient Macedonians when the Early Slavs arrived in Macedonia. He also found several Bulgar graves on the territory of the modern republic and argued the Slavs in Macedonia adopted the demonym "Bulgarians" in the 9th century. Milosavlevski and Crvenkovski challenged the myth of the significance of the communist partisan resistance movement against the Bulgarian Army during the Second World War, as well as challenging the significance of Lazar Koliševski in organising this resistance. Such works became the only exception to the new Macedonian historiography, with most historians staying loyal to the political elite, writing publications appropriating the Hellenistic part of the Macedonian past, the medieval Bulgarian Empire and the Bulgarian national revival from the Ottoman period. According to Macedonian professor of pathology and then-MP Vesna Janevska, the conflict during WWII was a fratricidal or civil war. Per Macedonian philosopher Katerina Kolozova, the term "Bulgarian fascist occupiers" is dubious, because significant part of them were practically local collaborators of the Bulgarian authorities. According to her, the connection of modern Macedonian identity with anti-fascism and partisans has been so deeply rooted in the society, that any historical revision of it is unimaginable. Historian Petar Todorov wrote that the myth of victimisation is among the biggest and most important myths within the historiography.

Intellectuals from the Macedonian elite, such as Denko Maleski and Ljubčo Georgievski, admit that the distinct Macedonian nation is a recent phenomenon that developed in the years around the Second World War. According to Bulgarian historian Naoum Kaytchev such views are spread among younger educated citizens, as well as Macedonians who lived in the 1940s. Their views align with scholars such as Hugh Poulton, Jan Rychlík and Ulf Brunnbauer.

== Foreign studies and views ==
The mainstream European historiography maintains that the separate Macedonian nation was developed during the Second World War. According to anthropologist Loring Danforth, the majority of Macedonian Slavs up until the Second World War did not have a clearly developed sense of national identity at all, any expression of it was superficial and imposed by educational and religious propaganda or by terrorism from guerilla bands. Danforth further states that the recent date of the creation of a Macedonian state and development of Macedonian nation, compared to other Balkan cases, does not make the Macedonian identity no more or less "artificial" than the others or any identity overall. Anthropologically the Macedonian national identity does not begin with ancient Macedonians, any more than the Greek national identity begins with the ancient Greeks, both claims of racial and cultural continuity are part of nation-building process itself. Also per Danforth, the ancient heritage of modern Balkan countries is not the mutually exclusive property of one specific nation but the shared inheritance of all Balkan peoples.

Historian John Van Antwerp Fine stated that throughout the Middle Ages and Ottoman era, the name Bulgarians was used to denote the local Slavs and those among them who had ethnic consciousness believed they are Bulgarians, and the designation "Macedonian" was entirely regional. According to Greek historian Apostolos Vacalopoulos, already from the beginning of the 18th century, there is mention only of Bulgarians in Macedonia, which reveals they formed the largest Slavic community there. The Macedonian Slavs were nationally amorphous during the 18th and the early 19th century. Afterwards they, already Bulgarian by name, began to acquire a Bulgarian national identity. Historian Alexander Maxwell maintains that national identity was espoused within small number of educated people at the end of the 19th century and by the middle of 20th century, Macedonians began to see Macedonian and Bulgarian loyalties as mutually exclusive. Per historian Bernard Lory the ethnic divergence between Bulgarians and Macedonians happened mainly in the first half of the 20th century. The identification as ethnic Bulgarians occurred in Macedonia during the Bulgarian National Revival, but it was vaguely defined, after 1878 in the Principality of Bulgaria it developed into a national ideology meanwhile in Macedonia the meaning remained vague, which made the divergence grow, especially in Vardar Macedonia after 1913 and it culminated there after 1944. According to historian Eugene N. Borza, the Macedonians, who are a recently emergent people and have had no history, need one, thus are in search of their past. This search is an attempt to help legitimize their uncertain present, surviving on a territory that historically has been the conflict between Greater Serbian and Bulgarian irredentism. Also per Borza, contrary to the claims that Josip Broz Tito invented the Macedonian ethnicity and language, he rather provided support and legitimacy to an natural internal nation-building process that started in the late 19th century and culminated with the creation of SR Macedonia. Per British academician T.J. Winnifrith, Macedonia is an attempt at a multicultural society but there the fragments are just about holding together, although the cement that binds them is an unreliable mixture of propaganda and myths. According to another British academician, James Pettifer, the pro-Belgrade elite that was built up in Skopje, consisted of hardline communists who were really Serbs, but masked as Macedonians. They justified their hegemony through a manufacturing a local history which was closer to a mythological narrative.

According to German historian Stefan Troebst, the Macedonian narrative was identical from 1944 to 1991. Troebst wrote in 1983 that historical research in SR Macedonia was about direct political action. He would go on to characterize this reciprocal dependence of historiography and politics as being more pronounced than what had been observed in Eastern and Southeast Europe. Per political consultant and journalist Carsten Wieland, Stefan Troebst sees the Macedonian nation building as an ideal example of Gellner's theory of nationalism. Since the creation of the Yugoslav Macedonia, it was realized immediately. According to Austrian historian Ulf Brunnbauer, the Macedonian nation-building process is still ongoing. Diverging approaches are discouraged within the historiography, due to economic limitations and academics who do try new approaches endanger their academic careers and get accused of being traitors. Croatian historian Tvrtko Jakovina cited the appropriation of Alexander the Great by the historiography as an example of an "obvious lie". Anthropologist Ivaylo Dichev argues that the Macedonian historiography has the impossible task of filling in the huge gaps between the ancient kingdom of Macedon that collapsed in the 2nd century BC, the 10th-11th century state of the Cometopuli, and Yugoslav Macedonia, established in the middle of the 20th century. Despite the myths of national purity and continuity that came to dominate the official Macedonian historiography, something not unusual for the Balkan region, historian İpek Yosmaoğlu affirmed there is not much to be gained from a search for a Macedonian national lineage, because the Macedonian nationhood was shaped mainly in the decades following World War II. According to the political scientist Kyril Drezov, the controversial continuity view is ahistorical, as it projects modern ethnic distinctions onto the past. Bulgarian historians view the presenting of the 19th and early 20th century Bulgarian identification as simply a term for peasant by Macedonian historians, as part of a systematic trend of denigrating and reviling the ethnonym "Bulgarian". Per Bulgarian social psychologist Georgi Stankov, the historiography is based on the postmodernist approach, which erases the distinctions between "fact" and "value" and "reality" and "perception." With respect to the Macedonian narrative, both Greek and Bulgarian historiographers have questioned Macedonian historiography's factual basis. Per economics historian Michael Palairet, in the three-way dispute about Macedonian identity, the Bulgarian view is slightly more objective than either the Greek or Macedonian view, but the Macedonian historiographical version departs from common sense and the historical record more than either the Greek or the Bulgarian ones.

== Gallery ==
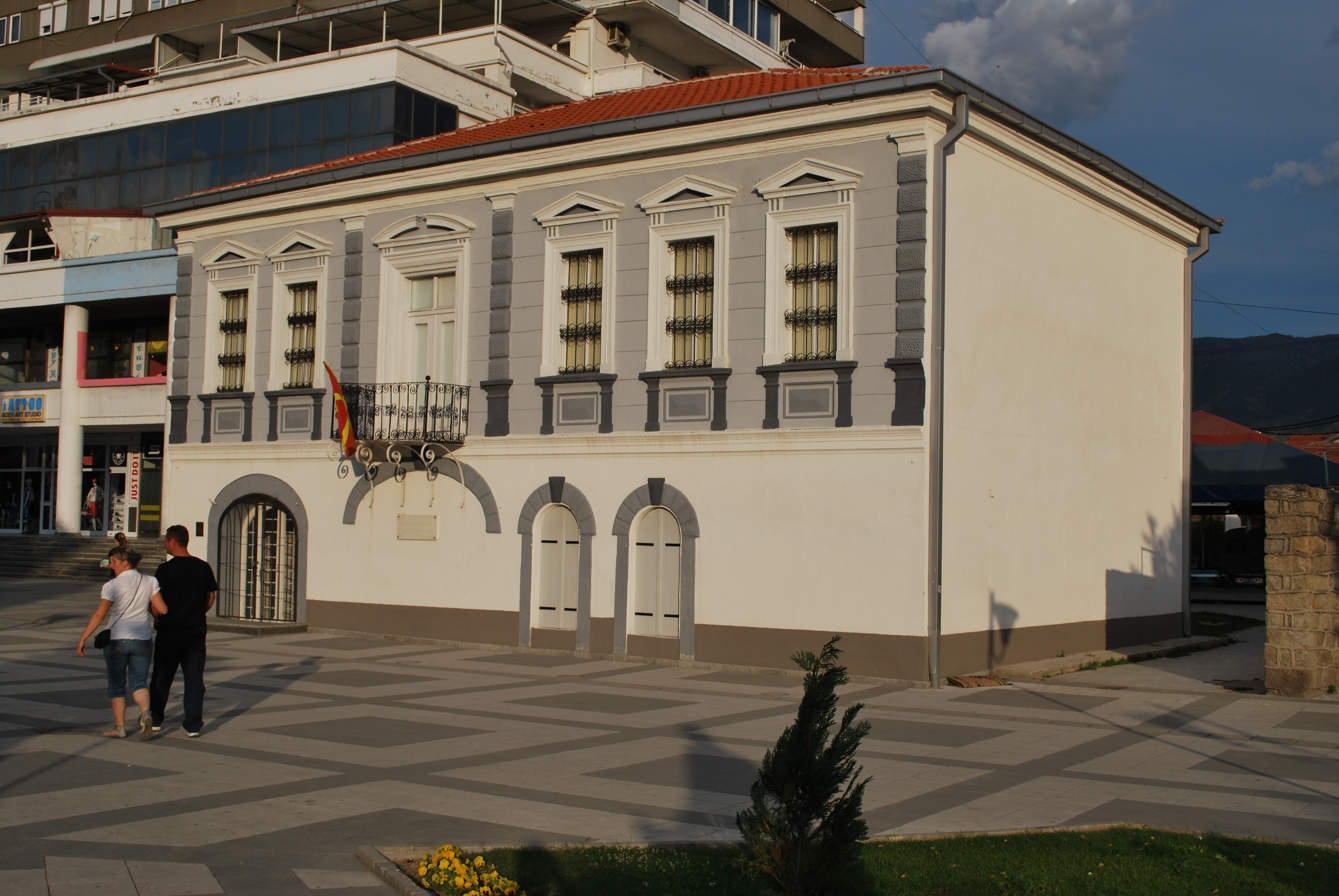
The former Bulgarian police station in Prilep was attacked by Partisan detachment on 11 October 1941. Today the object is memorial museum. In fact, the only victim of the attack, celebrated as the day of the Macedonian Uprising against Bulgarian fascists, was a local man conscripted in the Bulgarian police.

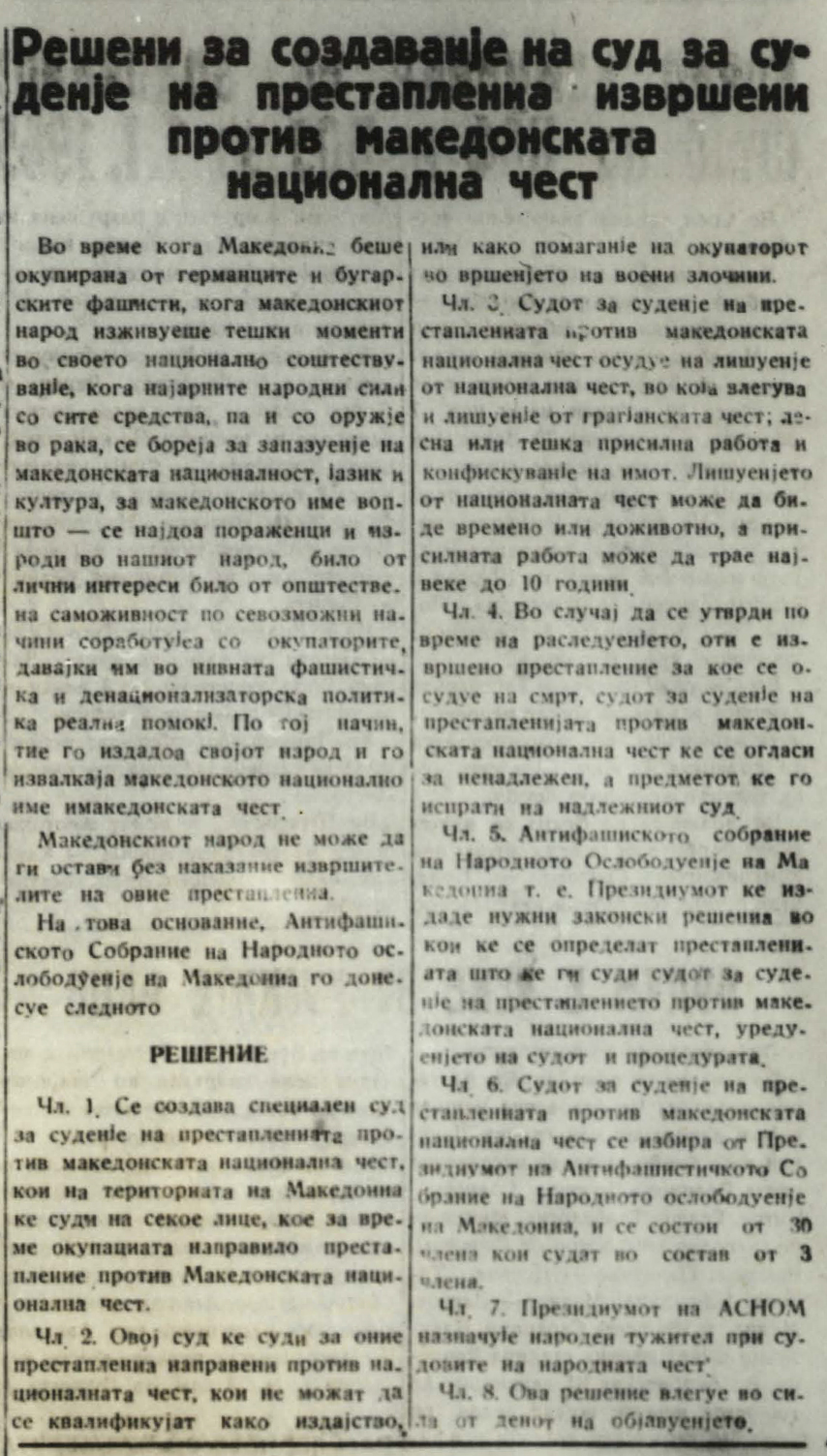
Statute of the Court for the Protection of Macedonian National Honour from January 1945. Per Bulgarian sources tens of thousands pro-Bulgarian elements were imprisoned, persecuted, repressed, etc. for violations of that Law, and 1,260 were killed in 1945. However, other Bulgarian researchers have questioned these figures, noting that the assertion that these individuals were persecuted and killed solely on account of their Bulgarian national consciousness is deceptive.

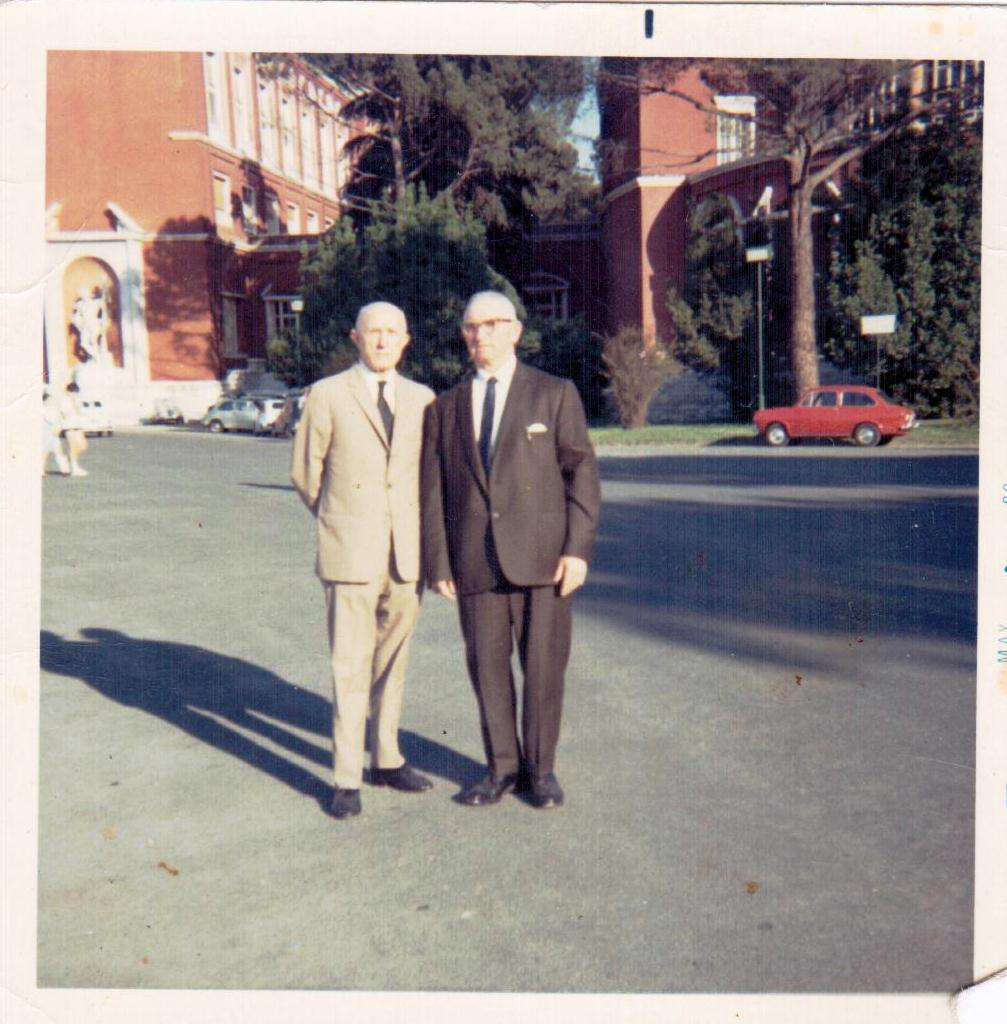
The last leader of the IMRO Ivan Mihailov (to the left) with the former IMRO activist Pandeli Stoyanov in Rome (1969). He is considered a bulgarophile and fascist from Macedonian historiography, while the organisation he led between 1924 and 1934 is also seen as a pro-Bulgarian.

== See also ==
- Macedonian Question
- Macedonian nationalism
- History of North Macedonia
- Archaeology of North Macedonia
- Sociology in North Macedonia
