= Sociology in North Macedonia =

Sociology in North Macedonia is an academic discipline. Its roots can be traced back to the establishment of the Faculty of Philosophy in Skopje as part of the University of Belgrade in 1920 in the Kingdom of Yugoslavia. After World War II, it was established as a separate national discipline and it has continued to develop in the post-independence period.

== Proto-sociological thought ==
In the 1870s, Georgi Pulevski was among the earliest authors who wrote about the Macedonian nation. He wrote two multilingual dictionaries, which also included his Slavic Macedonian vernacular. In his 1903 book On Macedonian Matters, Krste Misirkov postulated the existence of a separate Macedonian nation and set the foundations of the Macedonian language. Misirkov also published articles about economic deprivation and the transformation of traditional family units and communities due to pressure by the emerging modes of capitalist exchanges. In his first and only issue of his journal Vardar, he published a list of 120 villages containing information about their economic status, ethnic majorities (depicted as Macedonian in every case) and number of households.

== Interwar period ==
The roots of sociology in modern North Macedonia can be traced back to the formation of the Faculty of Philosophy in Skopje, as part of the University of Belgrade in the Kingdom of Yugoslavia, on 16 December 1920. The formation of the Faculty of Philosophy in Skopje aligned with supporting Serbian hegemony in Macedonia. In the 1930s, the first sociological seminars were organized in Skopje. Prvoš Slankamenac was the only sociology instructor in the interwar faculty. Articles on sociology were regularly published during the same period. Polish ethnosociologist Jozef Obrebski, who had stayed in the region of Poreče, conducted the first sociological studies after studying the local culture and traditions.

Sociologist Petre Georgievski described Boris Arsov as the first Macedonian sociologist. Arsov's research focused on the position of Balkan peasants in the social structure and the problems they faced. Arsov was also the founder and editor-in-chief of the journal Luc, a monthly magazine about cultural, economic, and social issues, published in Skopje, in 1937. In it, he also published analytical texts about social groups, the customs and culture of Macedonia. Another author who dealt with sociological issues in Macedonia, the Balkans, and Europe, was Kosta Veselinov, although he mostly worked and lived in Bulgaria. Sociology then attempted to explain social inequality and the position of the peasants in the social structure.

== Post-World War II period ==
After World War II in Yugoslavia, Macedonia became a federal state of Socialist Federal Republic of Yugoslavia (SFRY). Sociology was declared as a "bourgeois science" and was replaced by historical materialism, dialectical materialism and political economy, which were taught as subjects instead. After the Tito-Stalin split In 1948, SFRY split from the Stalinism of the Soviet Union. The Yugoslav Sociological Association was established in 1954, while the Institute of Social Sciences was founded in Belgrade in 1957. In 1962, a group of Macedonian scholars established the Macedonian Association of Philosophy and Sociology. Studies in sociology were first established in 1959 at the Faculty of Philosophy in Belgrade and a year later in Zagreb and Ljubljana. Sociology was only introduced as a subject at the faculties of the University of Skopje in 1960, but only for general education requirements. The sociologist profession was not institutionalized back then. Slavko Milosavlevski was the first sociologist to teach a sociological course at the Faculty of Law at the University of Skopje from 1961 to 1974 and published the first textbook in sociology, Introduction to Sociology, in 1967. In 1965, Blaga Petroska became the first doctor of sociology in SR Macedonia within SFR Yugoslavia at the Faculty of Philosophy in Skopje.

In 1966, the Institute for Sociological and Political-Juridical Research (ISPJR) was founded at the University of Skopje. In 1975, a Department of Sociology was founded within the Faculty of Philosophy at the University of Skopje. In this period, sociologists worked as sociology teachers in secondary schools. Sociologists then had a small amount of alternative options because of the high unemployment rate (36 percent). During the Cold War period, Macedonian sociology was for the most part passively part of Yugoslav sociology. Textbooks and sociological literature mainly came from developed sociological centers in SFRY, and there was a low level of contact with sociologists in other countries. There was only active sociological communication internationally with the Institute of Sociology at Jagiellonian University, which had begun in 1978, after professors Wladyslaw Kwasniewicz and Petre Georgievski made the initiative. Sociological studies were established in the academic year 1975/1976 at the Faculty of Philosophy in Skopje. Some professors of sociology taught at other faculties or worked in other research institutions before joining the Faculty of Philosophy or other universities. Since the establishment of Macedonian sociology, Macedonian sociologists had the opportunity to participate in international scientific conferences and congresses organized by the Yugoslav Association of Sociology, publish papers in Yugoslav sociological journals, like Sociology and The Sociological Review, and participate in sociological research done at the federal level. Yugoslav sociologists also had the opportunity to participate in conferences organized by the Institute of Sociology at the Faculty of Philosophy.

== Post-independence ==
The independence of the Republic of Macedonia (modern North Macedonia) from the SFRY, in 1991, led to changes to sociology, such as the sociological curriculum, and there was a shift towards modern theoretical and methodological paradigms. During this period, most Macedonian sociologists made efforts to undertake study visits to developed sociological centers around the world, and participate in international conferences.

In 1993, the International Sociological Association recognized Macedonia under its constitutional name and hosted Macedonian sociologists for the first time in its Council meeting in Sweden. Due to the decline of economic activity in the country and the Greek trade embargo on Macedonia during the Macedonia naming dispute, the funding of ISPJR was affected, which allowed it to conduct fewer research projects. In the late 1990s and early 2000s, the first Macedonian think tanks which developed sociological research were established, such as Institute for Democracy "Societas Civilis", Institute for Social and Humanistic Research "Euro-Balkan", and Center for European Strategies "Eurothink". Sociological courses also began to be taught as part of study programs in the same period. In 1999, a group of feminist scholars (including sociologists), established gender studies in Macedonia as part of the International Center for European Culture "Euro-Balkan", which became a graduate program at the Faculty of Philosophy in Skopje. In the academic year 2004/2005, 4-year undergraduate studies in sociology with the European Credit Transfer System (ECTS) were introduced. From 1975 to 2020, 1304 students graduated in sociology from the Institute of Sociology in Skopje. The Institute for Sociological, Political, and Juridical Research collaborated with the Institute of Sociology in 2011 in the creation of a doctoral program. Sociological analyses have been published in scientific journals, such as Spektar and Kontekst (published by the Institute of Macedonian Literature), Etnolog, and EthnoAntropoZoom. Makedonika (in Macedonian) and Ditura (in Albanian), Media outlets Puls, Fokus (in Macedonian) and Shenja (in Albanian) have also published sociological analyses.

== Organizations ==
=== Association of the Sociologists of the Republic of Macedonia ===
The Association of the Sociologists of the Republic of Macedonia has promoted the discipline in North Macedonia, connected Macedonian sociologists with the international sociological community, and promoted the domestic discipline internationally. Macedonian sociologists before were members of the Sociological Association of SFRY, which was established in 1954. The Macedonian association was established afterwards. It was re-established after the country's independence in 1991. The association strives to have the status of sociologists improved and recognized, and promotes them in the labor market.

=== Institute for Sociological, Political, and Juridical Research ===
In 1965, the University Council of University of Skopje founded the Institute for Sociological, Political, and Juridical Research (ISPJR) with the following objectives:

- Scientifically study the sociological, political and legal phenomena in the country;
- Encourage and organize the study of issues from a sociological, political and legal aspect;
- Develop and improve the research methods in social sciences and other research-related and educational activities.

It was also established because there was a need for research staff in the fields of sociology and political science. It started working in the academic year 1967/1968 and was involved in academic research related to the fields of sociology and political science. The institute researched social structures, village transformations, employment conflicts, social backgrounds of high school youth, religions and religiousness of the rural population, electoral systems in Macedonia and England, comparative analysis of social stratification and mobility in SR Macedonia and SR Slovenia, etc. The institute hired few sociologists with undergraduate degrees in sociology, leading to limited employment opportunities. Staff members then were mostly lawyers and philosophers.

The institute had two research divisions, for the purposes of sociological and political research. The division for sociological research was divided into research groups, such as ones researching general sociology, rural sociology, urban sociology, sociology of culture, social pathology, and scientific research methodology. Apart from sociology and political science, the institute also developed research in law, management, communication, etc. Since 2011, the institute also began organizing third-cycle study programs in the fields organizational sociology, environmental sociology, management, etc, in cooperation with the Faculty of Economics and the Institute of Economics in Skopje.

=== Institute of Sociology ===
The Institute of Sociology was established in 1973 as a study group in sociology at the Faculty of Philosophy in Skopje. Professors from the University of Belgrade contributed to the teaching activities of the institute and its development. The institute recognized the need for a second cycle of studies (master’s studies) in the academic year 1980/1981, but because it lacked teaching and scientific staff, it could not introduce them until 1992. In early 1992, the institute introduced the 2-year master's study program in sociology (Master of Arts in Sociology). The students gained a master's degree after defending their thesis. After the introduction of the European Credit Transfer System, the second cycle became 1 year (2 semesters for 60 ECTS credits). There are three modules: Culture and Religion, Economics and Human Resources Development, and Modern Macedonian Society.

In 2017, the institute developed first-cycle studies, which last 4 years (8 semesters), have 240 ECTS credits and six modules: population and sustainable development, policy and communications, European integration, research and analysis, culture, and sociology of ethnic groups, and a diploma thesis. The institute also offers second-cycle European Integration Studies, which were introduced in 2001 as 2-year (4 semesters) European studies in Integration and Communication. After the introduction of the European Credit Transfer System, these studies last 1 year (two semesters) and have 60 ECTS credits. Students gain the title of Master in European Integration Studies after graduation. The purpose of these studies is to form in-depth knowledge of the European Union and its institutions, especially its economic, political, security, and cultural institutions. The doctoral studies in sociology offered by the institute are part of the School for Doctoral Studies at University of Skopje. The members of the institute have participated in a project by the Macedonian Academy of Sciences and Arts (MANU) for developing terminological dictionaries in the Macedonian language. Many young sociologists worked on the project. The project led to the publication of the Dictionary of Sociological Terminology, in Macedonian, by the institute, the Faculty of Philosophy, and MANU.

== See also ==
- Historiography in North Macedonia
