= Todor Čepreganov =

Todor Čepreganov (Macedonian: Тодор Чепреганов) is a Macedonian historian, professor and former director of the Institute of National History of North Macedonia.

== Biography ==
Čepreganov was born on September 20, 1955, in the town of Štip, then in the Socialist Federal Republic of Yugoslavia. He completed his primary education in his hometown and high school in Skopje. In 1979 Čepreganov graduated in history from the University of Skopje. He defended there his master's degree in 1989 and his doctorate in 1993. Between 1995 and 2000 Čepreganov taught History of the Balkan peoples under the „Study abroad at UKIM“ program. From 1998 he was a member of the Institute of National History in Skopje, and between 2001 and 2012 its president. At the same time he was a mentor to several candidates for master's and doctoral dissertations; member of several organizations and associations in the country and abroad; member of editorial boards of scientific journals; member of commissions within the Ministry of Education and Science, etc.

== See also ==
- Historiography in North Macedonia
