= Zoran Todorovski =

Macedonian historian

Zoran Todorovski (Macedonian: Зоран Тодоровски) was a historian from North Macedonia. Todorovski was known to have a more balanced attitude towards Bulgarian historical narrative and did not deny the shared history of both countries. He tried to include the activity of the pro-Bulgarian interwar Internal Macedonian Revolutionary Organization into the Macedonian historical narrative. His revisionist and anti-communist views sparked controversy in the conservative local historical community during the post-Yugoslav period. As result, he was established as revisionist historian No 1 in the country.

== Biography ==
Zoran Todorovski was born in Skopje, SFR Yugoslavia on March 3, 1950. He graduated in history from the University of Skopje in 1972. He defended his master's degree in 1981 and his doctorate in 1981. In the course of his working career he worked in the Republican Committee for Culture (1975-1990) and in the Institute of National History (1990-1999). From 1999 to 2002 he was director of the State Archives of the Republic of Macedonia, and from 2002 to 2006 he worked again at the Institute of National History. From 2006 until his death on 5 March 2015 he was again a director of the State Archives of then Republic of Macedonia. Zoran Todorovski is the author of over a hundred scientific papers, of which twenty books and collections of documents, over 50 articles and appendices, 25 feuilletons and 33 historiographical additions to the periodical. He also participated in a number of international conferences. In cooperation with the State Archives of Bulgaria he published the diary of Krste Misirkov. Todorovski advocated for the rehabilitation of Todor Alexandrov and Ivan Mihailov from the historiography in North Macedonia.
