= On Macedonian Matters =

1903 book by Krste Misirkov

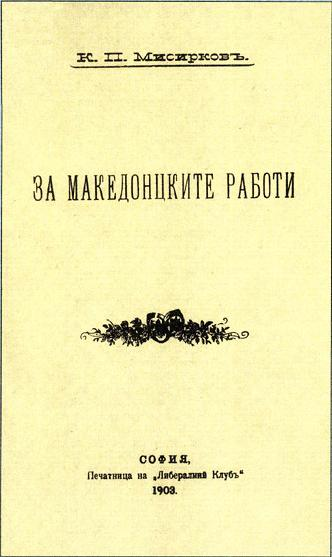
- Author: Krste Misirkov
- Original title: За македонцките работи
- Genre: linguistics, history, ethnography, politics, analytics
- Publication date: 1903
- Publication place: Bulgaria
- Media type: printed

On Macedonian Matters (Cyrillic: За македонцките работи; Za makedonckite raboti) is a book written by Krste Misirkov and published in 1903 in Sofia, Bulgaria. The book presents the author's views towards the Macedonian Question, and explores the sense of national belonging and nеed for affirmation of the Macedonians as a separate people. The book marked the first complete outline of Macedonian as a separate language and proposed the need for its codification. The book also covers the rules of the standard language, its orthography and alphabet.

== History ==
=== Background ===
In the early 1900s, Misirkov was a student in Saint Petersburg where he joined a pro-Bulgarian Secret Macedonian-Adrianople Circle. The main objective of the circle was the political autonomy of the Macedonia and Thrace, declared by the Internal Macedonian Revolutionary Organization (IMRO). He graduated in 1902, and later left for Ottoman Macedonia. There Misirkov accepted the proposal of the Bulgarian Exarchate to be appointed as a teacher in the Bulgarian men's high school of Bitola. In Bitola he befriended the Russian consul Aleksandr Rostkovsky. The Ilinden Uprising and the assassination of Rostkovsky in the summer of 1903 forced Misirkov to move back to Russia. In the autumn of 1903, he arrived in St. Petersburg, where he became active in the Slavic-Macedonian Scientific Literary Society. At the same time, he wrote the pamphlet On Macedonian Matters. In November 1903, he came to Sofia with the aim to print the book.

=== Content ===
Za makedonckite raboti marked the first attempt to formalize a separate Macedonian literary language. With the book, Misirkov outlined an overview of the Macedonian grammar and expressed the ultimate goal of codifying the language and using it as the language of instruction in the education system. The author proposed to use the west-central Macedonian dialects (Prilep-Bitola) as a dialectal basis for the formation of the Macedonian standard language. His ideas however were not adopted until the 1940s. Misirkov appealed to the Ottoman authorities for the eventual recognition of a separate Macedonian nation. However, he admitted there was not one, as most of the Macedonian Slavs have been called and called themselves Bulgarians, but it should be created, when the necessary historical circumstances would arise. Misirkov also wrote about "Macedonians of Slav origin and certain other Macedonian nationalities."

He claimed that the Byzantine Greeks renamed the Bulgarian and Macedonian Slavs into "Bulgarians" because of their alliance with the Bulgars (which he considered as Mongolic people), during the incessant Byzantine–Bulgarian conflict, which in the eyes of the Byzantines eventually forged Slavs and Bulgars into one people with a Bulgarian name and a Slavonic language, then preserved by the Archbishopric of Ohrid and later the Macedonians adopted the term "Bulgarian" to differentiate from Greeks. Misirkov described the emergence of the Macedonians as a separate Slavic people as a "perfectly normal historical process", comparable to the way the Bulgarian, Croatian, and Serbian peoples had developed out of the broader South Slavic group. For him, education was crucial for national distinctiveness, while science and literature were the most important factors in national development. He argued for the renewal of the Archbishopric of Ohrid and opposed having three Orthodox religious-educational systems, which would result in different religious, linguistic, and national affiliations.

He presented Tsar Samuel as the key historical figure supporting Macedonian distinctiveness. Misirkov described Samuel's state as Macedonian, without Slavic attributes, and argued that the fall of Samuel's empire marked the beginning of continued Macedonian resistance to Byzantium, writing that "the Macedonians many times rebelled against Byzantium".

After incorporation in the Dušan's kingdom, according to him, the Macedonians were considered as Serbs by the Serbs and the Byzantines. Thus, until the Ottoman conquest of the Balkans, the Macedonians were renamed three times: as Slavs, Bulgarians, and Serbs. Misirkov then wrote how Macedonians were under different names under the Ottoman reign and why the Turks and the Greeks referred to the Macedonians as Bulgarians during the rise of nationalism in the Ottoman Empire.

According to him, using the name "Bulgarian" in relation to Macedonian was "a historical misunderstanding". He described the Bulgarian feeling in the Macedonians as the "biggest disaster" and that Bulgaria was "the evil demon" of Macedonia, which he regarded as the biggest threat to the project.

Misirkov also criticized IMRO, which he perceived as these "Bulgarian committees" led by "Bulgarian clerks", who aimed for the unification of Macedonia with Bulgaria and the creation of "Bulgarian Macedonia", and he attacked the Bulgarian Exarchate too, viewing it along with IMRO as an exponent of Bulgarian interests in Macedonia. He also acknowledged the impact of Serbian propaganda, noting that the Serbs have not succeeded in turning the Macedonians into Serbs, but succeeded in convincing Europe that there are Serbs in Macedonia. Although he opposed the Serbian position, he nevertheless recognized its influence, writing that "the Macedonian national revival is basically the result of the competition between Bulgaria and Serbia over the Macedonian question". Misirkov argued that one of the primary goals of the Macedonian intelligentsia should be to drive out the national and religious Serbian, Bulgarian and Greek propaganda from Macedonia, otherwise they would eventually lead to its partition. He wrote that only an energetic fight against Greece, Serbia and Bulgaria could save Macedonia from annihilation, and only a separate Macedonian national self-awareness can give the moral right to fight against the partition. Misirkov recommended that Macedonia should remain part of the Ottoman Empire as he perceived the Macedonian nation as being not yet "solid enough" to emerge as a separate unit, and as such would be protected from the aggressive propaganda of its neighbors.

=== Aftermath and legacy ===
The pamphlet was published at the end of 1903 in Sofia. The book argued for a distinct Macedonian identity and language. Because of its content, the Bulgarian police confiscated the book, destroyed most of the copies, and expelled Misirkov, as the authorities tried to prevent its popularization. IMRO activists destroyed a number of copies too. Because of this at his own time, the book had little or no impact and did not become popular until the middle of the 1940s. Misirkov arrived in Belgrade in December, where he met with Stojan Novaković, at that time a Serbian foreign minister. Novaković was the first politician to decide to use Macedonian nationalism as an ideology, in order to oppose the Bulgarian positions in Macedonia and as a transitional stage towards the complete Serbization of the Macedonian Slavs. From this book, Novaković ordered the purchase of 50 pieces by the Serbian Diplomatic Agency in Sofia. The purchased exemplars were shipped through Serbian diplomatic channels to Ottoman Macedonia.

In 1905, Misirkov returned to a pro-Bulgarian stance. Also, he published a series of articles in IMRO's press written from a Bulgarian nationalist perspective, claiming Bulgarian identity for himself and the Macedonian Slavs. In 1907, in the preface to his article "Notes on South Slavic Philology and History", Misirkov wrote:

The readers of this article will probably be surprised by the huge contradiction they will encounter in it compared to what they have read or can read in my brochure "On Macedonian Affairs". To guess this contradiction, it is enough to recall that I acted as an improvised politician there. This "policy" was supposed to neutralize Macedonian interests in the Balkan states and prove the ethnic and historical individuality of the Macedonians. But since in this "policy" they could see the "manner" of the Bulgarian government, not a few unnecessary harsh words were uttered against the latter. These superfluous "proofs" that my thoughts were not at all the manner of the Bulgarian government, but of an improvised "politician" on the Macedonian question, as well as the entire content of the brochure, were so far removed from impartial science that I considered it extremely inconvenient in my two-month stay in Sofia to meet with any of Sofia's philologists and historians.

However, Misirkov later wrote that he did not regret declaring himself for Macedonian separatism and that his Macedonian patriotism defeats his Bulgarian patriotism. He would return to the Macedonian national ideas especially in the 1920s, when it was possible to receive a much more favorable reaction by the public. Misirkov also advocated Bulgarian identity for the Macedonian Slavs as a choice preferable to Serbian.

Although the language planners involved in the codification of standard Macedonian in 1944 were not familiar of Misirkov's book, since most of the copies of it were destroyed, they were familiar with Misirkov's historical legacy. Hence, the west-central Macedonian dialectal basis proposed by Misirkov is the same to that of standard Macedonian.

The book was reprinted in 1946, from a copy found by Kole Nedelkovski in the Sofia public library, and it has been cited by Macedonian historians as an indication of the existence of a separate Macedonian ethnicity at Misirkov's time.

The book has been described as a "manifesto" of Macedonian nationalism by historian Tchavdar Marinov. Per Marinov, the Bulgarian critics of his work perceived Misirkov's ideology as pro-Serbian. Anthropologist Keith Brown described the book as the "brilliant and polemical anti-Bulgarian and autonomist work of Krste Misirkov". Misirkov's work is frequently cited in contemporary debates on Macedonian national identity. The book is regarded as the central text of Macedonian national identity, and his ideas continue to shape how the Macedonian nation is understood by Macedonians. Unlike recent Macedonian nationalist claims, Misirkov's book acknowledged that the ideas of a distinct Macedonian nation and language emerged at the eve of the 20th century.

== Gallery ==
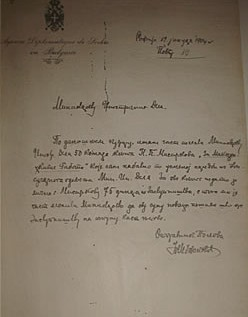
A letter from the Serbian embassy in Sofia to the Ministry of Foreign Affairs of Serbia, regarding purchasing of 50 copies of Misirkov's book.

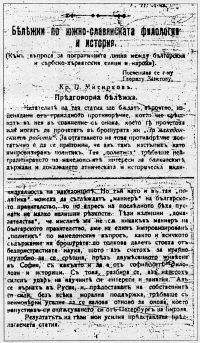
In 1907, in the introduction to his article "Notes on South Slavic Philology and History", Misirkov rejected the ideas of his 1903 book.

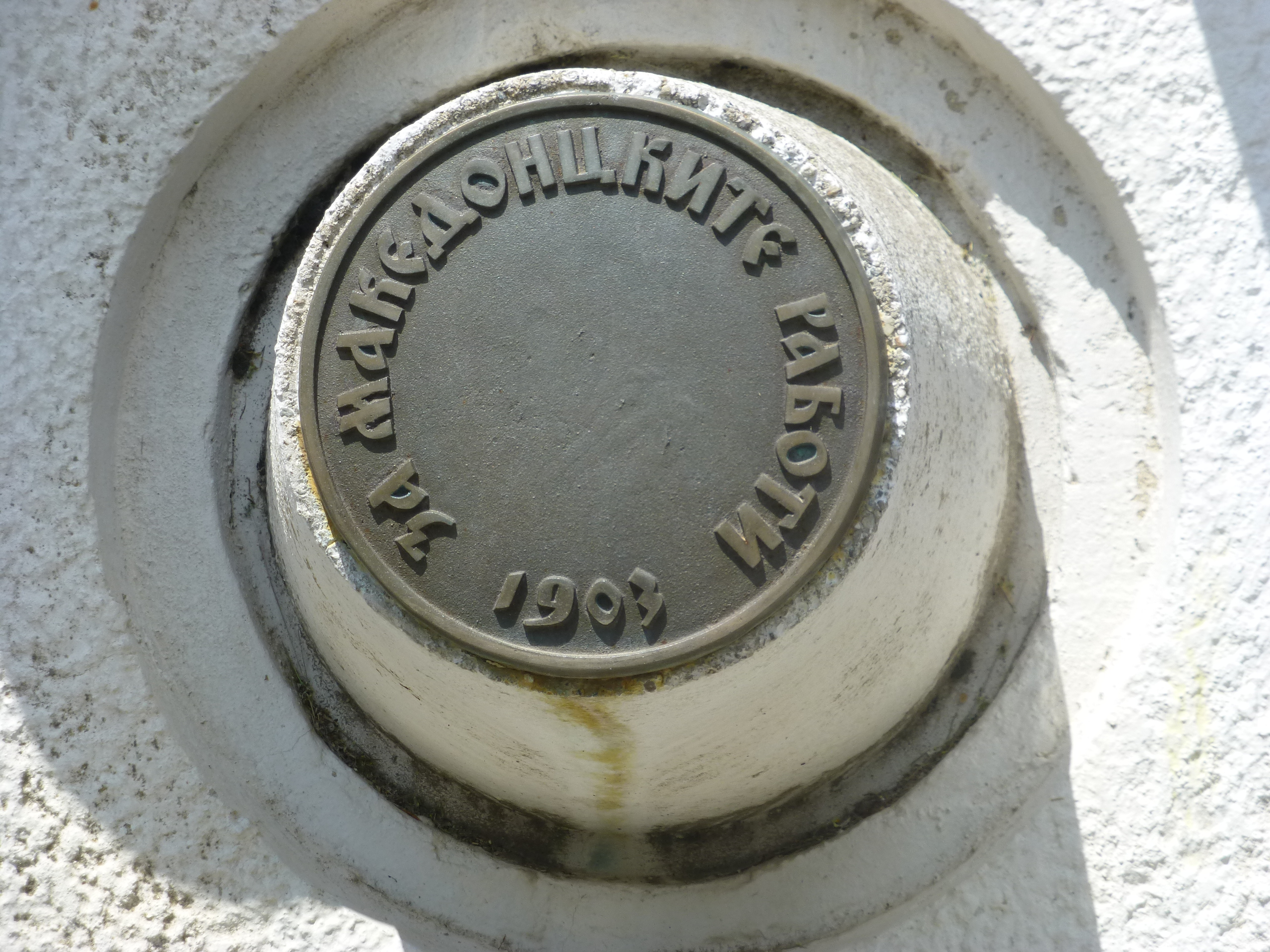
Misirkov's On the Macedonian Matters commemorated as one of the key points of Macedonia's history, at the Makedonium memorial in Kruševo
