= Secretary of the Presidency of the League of Communists of Macedonia =

Administrative leader of the League of Communists of Macedonia

- Macedonian: Секретар на Претседателството на Сојузот на комунистите на Македонија
- Emblems of the LCY
- Type: Chief of staff
- Member of: SKM Presidency
- Appointer: SKM Presidency
- Term length: Two years, renewable (1972–1990)
- Constituting instrument: LCY Charter & SKM Charter
- Formation: 12 November 1966
- First holder: Boško Stankovski
- Final holder: Tito Petkovski
- Abolished: 20 April 1991

The secretary was the highest administrative leader of the Presidency of the Central Committee of the League of Communists of Macedonia (SKM), the ruling party of the Socialist Republic of Macedonia (SR Macedonia) in the Socialist Federal Republic of Yugoslavia and a branch of the League of Communists of Yugoslavia (LCY). The officeholder was elected by and answerable to the SKM Presidency.

== Office history ==
Title	Established	Abolished	Established by
Secretary of the Executive Bureau of the Central Committee of the League of Communists of Macedonia; Macedonian: Секретар на Извршното биро на ЦК на Сојузот на комунистите на Македонија	12 November 1966	12 April 1974	? Plenary Session of the Central Committee of the 4th Congress
Secretary of the Executive Committee of the Central Committee of the League of Communists of Macedonia; Macedonian: Секретар на Извршниот комитет на ЦК на Сојузот на комунистите на Македонија	12 April 1974	8 May 1982	6th Congress of the League of Communists of Macedonia
Secretary of the Presidency of the Central Committee of the League of Communists of Macedonia; Macedonian: Секретар на Претседателството на ЦК на Сојузот на комунистите на Македонија	8 May 1982	20 April 1991	8th Congress of the League of Communists of Macedonia

== Officeholders ==
Secretaries of the Presidency of the Central Committee of the League of Communists of Macedonia
No.	Name	Took office	Left office	Tenure	Term of office	Birth	PM	Death	Ref.
1	Boško Stankovski	12 November 1966	12 December 1968	2 years, 30 days	4th–5th (1963–1974)	1925	1943	1987	
2	Angel Čemerski	12 December 1968	20 March 1969	98 days	5th (1968–1974)	1923	1942	2003	
3	Slavko Milosavlevski	20 March 1969	29 October 1972	3 years, 223 days	5th (1968–1974)	1928	1943	2012	
4	Boro Denkov	25 November 1972	8 May 1982	9 years, 164 days	5th–7th (1968–1982)	1937	1966	2017	
5	Milan Pančevski	8 May 1982	5 May 1984	1 year, 363 days	8th (1982–1986)	1935	1957	2019	
6	Jakov Lazaroski	5 May 1984	10 May 1986	2 years, 5 days	8th (1982–1986)	1936	1953	2021	
7	Mihail Danev	10 May 1986	28 November 1989	3 years, 202 days	9th (1986–1989)	1941	1964	Alive	
8	Tito Petkovski	28 November 1989	20 April 1991	1 year, 143 days	10th (1989–1991)	1945	?	Alive	

== Bibliography ==
- Bechev, Dimitar (2019). Historical Dictionary of North Macedonia. Rowman & Littlefield Publishers. ISBN 9781538119617.
- Lewytzkyj, Borys; Stroynowski, Juliusz, eds. (1978). Who's Who in the Socialist Countries. K. G. Saur Verlag. ISBN 3-7940-3017-6.
- Spasenovski, Aleksandar (December 2019). "The Transformation of the Macedonian Party System: From Monism Towards Pluralism". Political Thought. 17 (58). Konrad Adenauer Foundation and the Institute for Democracy Societas Civilis: 19–38. Archived from the original on 11 June 2023.
- Staff writer, ed. (1966). Svjetski almanah [World Almanac] (in Serbo-Croatian). Vol. 4. Novinsko izdavačko poduzeće.
- Stroynowski, Juliusz, ed. (1989a). Who's Who in the Socialist Countries of Europe: A–H. K. G. Saur Verlag. ISBN 3-598-10719-6.
- Stroynowski, Juliusz, ed. (1989b). Who's Who in the Socialist Countries of Europe: I–O. K. G. Saur Verlag. ISBN 3-598-10719-6.
- Stroynowski, Juliusz, ed. (1989c). Who's Who in the Socialist Countries of Europe: P–Z. K. G. Saur Verlag. ISBN 3-598-10719-6.
- Vuković, Zdravko; Rajović, Radošin (1989). Od deformacija SDB do maspoka i liberalizma: Od deformacija SDB do maspoka i liberalizma: moji stenografski zapisi 1966–1972 [From Deformations of SDB to Maspok and Liberalism: My Shorthand Notes 1966–1972] (in Serbo-Croatian). Narodna knj. ISBN 9788633101288.
