= Krste Misirkov =

Academic and journalist (1874–1926)

- Крсте Мисирков
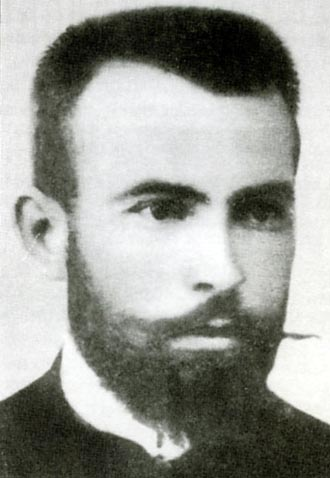
- Portrait of Krste P. Misirkov
- Born: Krastyo Petkov Misirkov; 18 November 1874; Postol, Ottoman Empire
- Died: 1926; Sofia, Kingdom of Bulgaria
- Citizenship: Ottoman, Moldavian, Russian, Bulgarian
- Education: Faculty of History and Philosophy at the University of Saint Petersburg
- Occupations: Philologist, teacher, historian, ethnographer, journalist and folklorist
- Spouse: Ekaterina Mihaylovna - Misirkova
- Children: Sergey Misirkov
- Writing career
- Pen name: "K. Pelski", "Sekol"
- Genres: History, linguistics, philology, politics, and ethnography
- Subjects: History, language and ethnicity
- Notable work: On Macedonian Matters

Krste Petkov Misirkov (Macedonian: Крсте Петков Мисирков, pronounced ['kr̩stɛ 'pɛtkɔf mi'sirkɔf]; Bulgarian: Кръсте Петков Мисирков; Serbo-Croatian Cyrillic: Крста Петковић Мисирков; 18 November 1874 – 1926) was a philologist, journalist, historian, folklorist and ethnographer from the region of Macedonia.

In the period between 1903 and 1905, he published the book titled On Macedonian Matters and the journal Vardar in which he affirmed the existence of a Macedonian national identity separate from other Balkan nations, and attempted to codify a standard Macedonian language based on the central Western Macedonian dialects. Misirkov is regarded as the forefather of the Macedonian nation and for his efforts to codify a standard Macedonian language, he is often considered "the founder of the modern Macedonian literary language". A survey conducted by the newspaper Vreme in the Republic of Macedonia (now North Macedonia) in the 2000s found Misirkov to be "the most significant Macedonian of the 20th century".

He was one of the founders of the pro-Bulgarian Secret Macedonian-Adrianople Circle established in 1900 in Saint Petersburg. In 1902, he was among the founders of the Macedonian Scientific and Literary Society. After 1905, he began publishing predominantly articles, written from a Bulgarian nationalist perspective in the Internal Macedonian Revolutionary Organization-affiliated press. In his diary written during the Balkan Wars, he espoused a Bulgarian nationalist stance. During the First World War, he became a member of the local parliament in Bessarabia as a representative of the Bulgarian minority there. After the First World War, he switched back and forth between the Bulgarian national cause and the Macedonian one. Because Misirkov expressed conflicting views about the national identity of the Macedonian Slavs at different points in his life, his national affiliation and legacy have been disputed between Bulgaria and North Macedonia.

== Biography ==
=== Early years ===
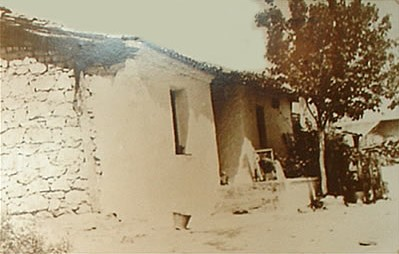
Misirkov's birth house in Postol

He was born as Krastyo Petkov Misirkov on 18 November 1874 in the village of Postol in the Salonica vilayet of the Ottoman Empire (present-day Pella, Greece). He completed his primary education in a Greek school in his native village. Due to the poor financial situation of his family, he became a farmer. Misirkov was granted a scholarship by a Serbian association, Society of Saint Sava. He then continued his education in Belgrade at the evening school of the Society of St. Sava in 1889. Due to the reaction of the students against the assimilationist tendencies of the Serbian government, a group of them was expelled, including Misirkov. He continued his education in Sofia in 1890. In early 1891, he returned to Belgrade again, to the Theological School. Due to a rebellion in the school and its disbandment, Misirkov went to study in Šabac. In 1892, after graduating, he transferred back to Belgrade to study in the "Teachers' School". In 1893, Misirkov became a founder and member of an association of Macedonian students called "Vardar", which was banned by the Serbian authorities in 1895.

=== Russian Empire and Bulgaria ===
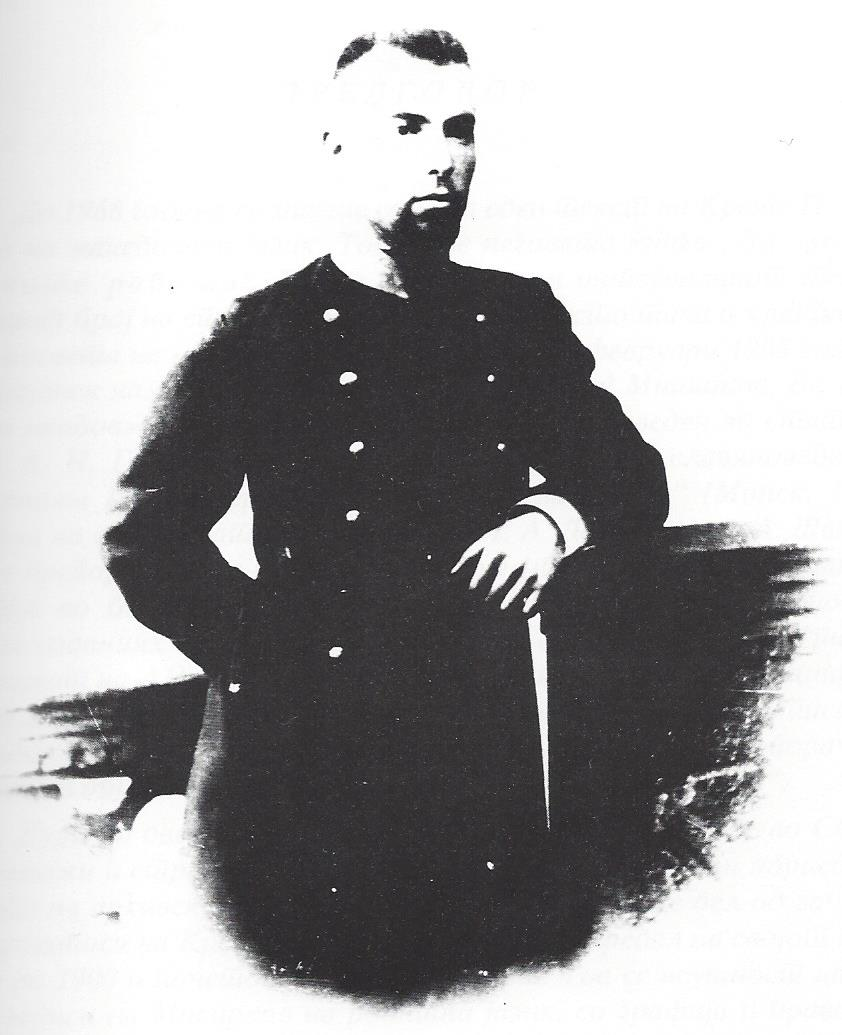
Krste Misirkov in 1899

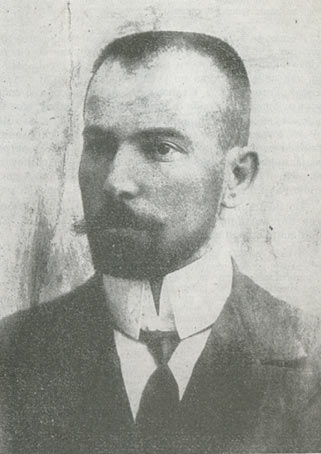
Portrait of Krste Misirkov from Odesa in 1905.

In 1895, Misirkov graduated from the Teachers' School and was appointed as a teacher in Pristina. However, Misirkov did not take this position and went to Odesa to continue his education. Since his diploma from Belgrade was not recognized, he studied for two more years at the Poltava Theological Seminary, which he graduated in 1897. After finishing the Theological Seminary, Misirkov repeatedly pleaded to pursue Slavic studies, sending applications for stipend to the Ministry of Education in Sofia, Nizhyn Lyceum of Prince Bezborodko, and Moscow's city authorities, but each was rejected due to exhausted funds or closed admissions. In all documents he consistently declared himself as Macedonian Slav. In 1897 he managed to enroll in University of Saint Petersburg, first at the Military Medical Academy and then at the Faculty of History and Philology. He published his first scientific contribution as a student writer in the journal Living Antiquity in 1898.

On 15 November 1900, Misirkov and other students in Russia created Secret Macedonian-Adrianople Circle in Saint Petersburg. The main objective of the circle was the political autonomy for Macedonia and Adrianople regions guaranteed by the Great Powers. In a letter sent to the President of the Supreme Macedonian-Adrianople Committee on 28 November of the same year, the founders of the circle stated that "there is no Bulgarian who is not interested in the situation and fate of that part of our homeland, which continue to groan under the yoke of the tyrant". In 1902, he was among the founders of the Macedonian Scientific and Literary Society. He graduated in 1902. He enrolled in postgraduate studies in Slavic philology with the thesis "On the Question of Nationality and the Causes of the Popularity of Krali Marko". Due to financial constraints, Misirkov could not continue his post-university education, which is why he accepted the Bulgarian Exarchate's offer to be appointed as a teacher at the Bitola Boys' High School. Having taken up this position, Misirkov simultaneously became a home tutor for the children of the Russian consul in Bitola, Aleksandar Rostkovsky, who was his close friend. After the consul's assassination, he went to Russia, where he prepared his book On the Macedonian Matters. He traveled again to Sofia to publish the book. Because of its content, the Bulgarian police confiscated the book and destroyed most of its copies, and expelled Misirkov to Russia. As a result, Misirkov's ideas remained mostly unknown to people, since they failed to reach broader audience. Per historian Tchavdar Marinov and political scientist Alexis Heraclides, after writing his book, Misirkov "oscillated between extreme Macedonian nationalism – sometimes . . . with clear pro-Serbian elements – and Greater Bulgarian irredentism". After 1903, he had an anti-Serbian stance.

After 1905, Misirkov halted his advocation of Macedonian separatism and opposed the Serbian position on the Macedonian Question. In that period, he published pro-Bulgarian articles. On 18 April 1907, Misirkov began to cooperate with the Sofia magazine "Macedonian-Adrianople Review", edited by Nikola Naumov, which was de facto organ of the IMRO. On 1 October 1909, he printed the article, "The foundations of a Serbian-Bulgarian rapprochement" in the magazine, "Bulgarian Collection", edited by Bulgarian diplomats and officials in St. Petersburg. During this period, a Slavic Festival was held in Sofia in 1910 with Misirkov invited to attend as its guest of honor.

== Balkan Wars and World War I ==
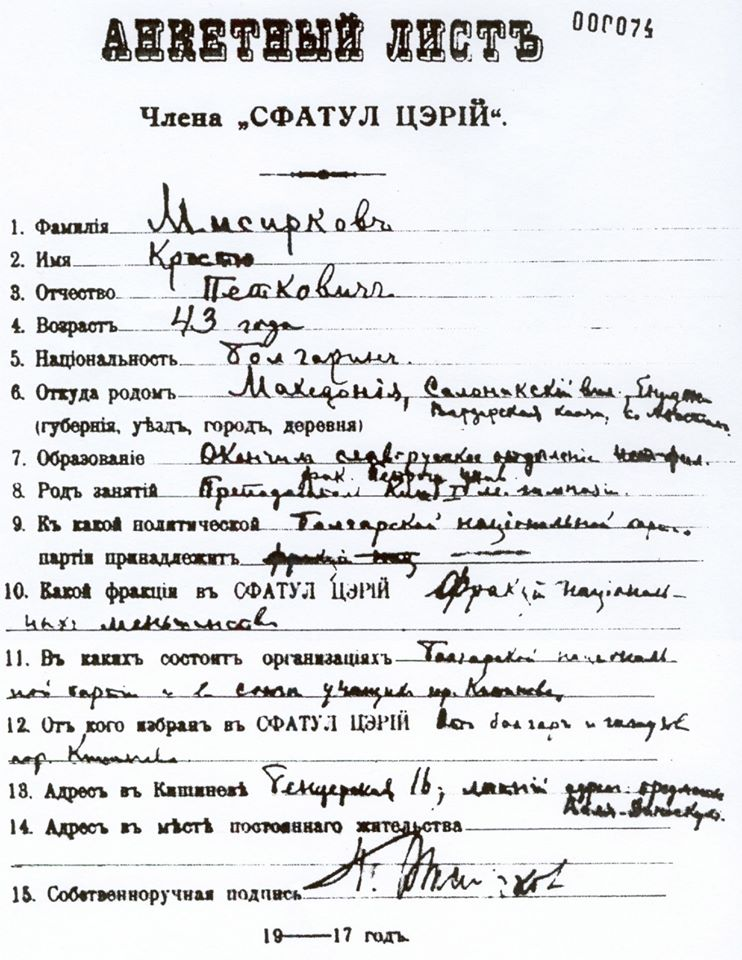
Questionnaire written in the Russian language filled by Misirkov as a member of Sfatul Țării in Bessarabia, where he defined himself as a Bulgarian born in Macedonia.

When the First Balkan War had begun, Misirkov went to Macedonia as a Russian war correspondent. In Macedonia, he could follow the military operations of the Bulgarian Army. Misirkov published some articles in the Russian press demanding that the Ottomans be driven out of Macedonia. The Greek authorities expelled him from Thessaloniki and in 1913 after the outbreak of the Second Balkan War, Misirkov went back to Russia, where he worked as a teacher in the Bulgarian-language schools in Odesa. Later, he was appointed as a teacher of the Bulgarian language school in Chișinău. While working as a teacher in Chișinău, Misirkov sent а letter to the Bulgarian academic Aleksandar Teodorov-Balan with a request to be assigned as a professor at Sofia University, self-identifying as a Bulgarian: "As a Bulgarian, I would willingly return to Bulgaria, if there is a need of a scientific research of the fate of the Bulgarian lands, especially Macedonia..." A shorter letter with similar content was sent to another professor at Sofia University – Vasil Zlatarski, with the request to be assigned as a chosen at the newly established department for history of Macedonia and the other western Bulgarian lands. During the Balkan Wars, Misirkov was politically active as a Macedonian Bulgarian. Misirkov proposed several ways to resolve the Macedonian Question, from autonomy for Macedonia to the inclusion of Macedonia within Bulgaria. He stayed at the Klimentovo farmstead, near Okhtyrka, Kharkov province, from where he wrote his diary.

Misirkov published articles in Russian in the newspaper Macedonian Voice in 1913 and 1914. In a letter dated 19 August 1914 to Nikolai Ivanovich Guchkov, chairman of the Slavic Committee in Moscow, he called Serbia's policy "predatory" and referred to "enslavement of the Slavic Bulgarian people". After the outbreak of the First World War in 1914, Bessarabia became a democratic republic, and he was elected as a member of the local parliament Sfatul Țării to represent the Bulgarian minority. Throughout the war, he engaged in pro-Bulgarian propaganda. After the First World War, he switched several times from the Bulgarian national cause to the Macedonian one and vice versa.

=== Last years in Bulgaria ===
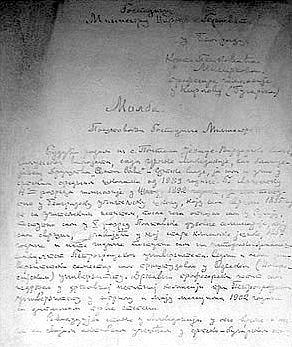
Misirkov's application, where he defined himself as a Krsta Petković, sent to the Yugoslav authorities where he asks for a job in Macedonia, c. 1919.

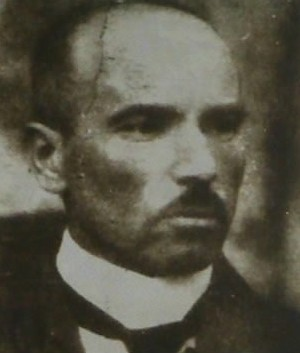
The last picture of Misirkov

After being expelled by the Romanian authorities, Misirkov returned to Sofia at the end of 1918, where he spent one year as a head of the Historical Department of the National Museum of Ethnography. Due to his poor financial situation, he moved to the interior of Bulgaria. He proceeded to work as a teacher and director of the high schools in Karlovo and Koprivshtitsa. In Karlovo, he was a founder of the Archaeological Museum, was elected as editor of the Student Library and head of the Historical and Archaeological Society. Per academician Nikola Traykov and a former friend of Misirkov, academic Petko Stoyanov, IMRO wanted to assassinate Misirkov, but decided not to after Stoyanov convinced a representative of the organization. In this period, Misirkov also advocated a Bulgarian identity for the Macedonians as a choice preferable to Serbian. He also resumed his journalistic activity and published many articles on the Macedonian Question in the Bulgarian press, such as Bulgarian nationalist ones, as well as expressing Macedonian national ideas in some articles. Misirkov died on 26 June or 26 July 1926 from brain tumor and was buried in the graveyards in Sofia. The Ministry of Education issued a financial support of 5,000 levs for his burial.

== Works ==
=== On the Macedonian Matters ===
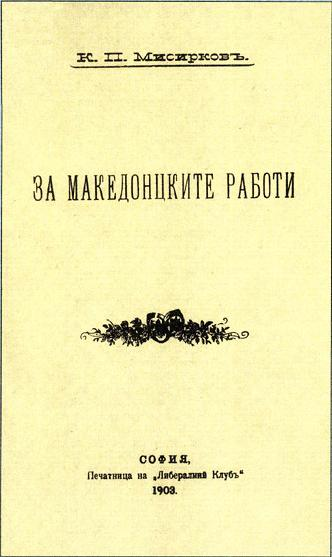
Front cover of the book On the Macedonian Matters

The most influential work by Misirkov is the book On the Macedonian Matters (Original: За македонцките работи), published in 1903 in Sofia, in which he laid down the principles of modern Macedonian. This book was written in the Macedonian dialects from the area between Prilep and Bitola. It argued in favor of national separation, the establishment of autonomous national institutions within the Ottoman Empire, and the standardization of a distinct Macedonian language. According to Misirkov, the Macedonian literary language should be based on dialects from the west-central part of Macedonia, which were used in the book itself. He wrote that one of the primary aims of the Macedonian intelligentsia should be to drive out the national and religious Serbian, Bulgarian and Greek propaganda from Macedonia, otherwise they would eventually lead to its partition. Furthermore, Misirkov appealed to the Ottoman authorities for eventual recognition of a separate Macedonian nation. He admitted that there was no Macedonian nation, but argued that it should be created, when the necessary historical circumstances would arise. Misirkov attacked both the Bulgarian Exarchate and the Internal Macedonian Revolutionary Organization (IMRO) as agents of the Bulgarian interests in Macedonia, which he considered the biggest threat to his project. He also saw the Bulgarian feeling in Macedonians as "biggest disaster" and Bulgaria as "the evil demon" of Macedonia. Shortly after its publication, the Bulgarian police confiscated the book and destroyed most of its copies. IMRO activists also destroyed number of copies. IMRO's activists opposed Misirkov's program and regarded his language as "Misirkov's mess". Misirkov's book is considered the "manifesto" of Macedonian nationalism and "both a political pamphlet and the first serious attempt at standardization of the Slavic vernacular language of Macedonia".

=== Journal Vardar ===
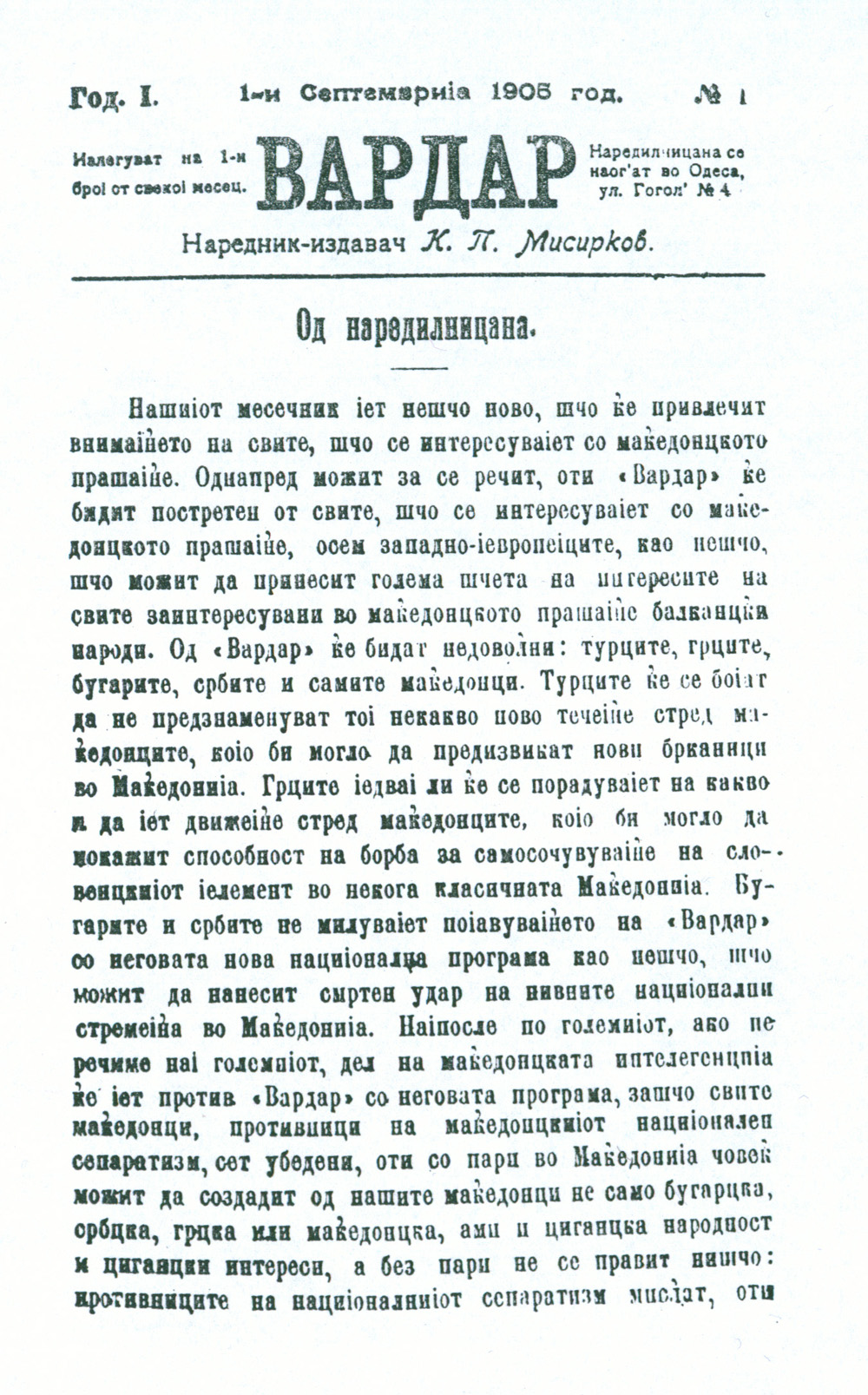
The first page of the journal Vardar

Misirkov was the author and editor of the journal Vardar in Macedonian. The journal Vardar was published in 1905 in Odesa, Russian Empire. He expressed views about the national distinctiveness of the Macedonians. In the first and only issue of the journal, he gave a list of 120 villages in southern Macedonia with information about their economic status, ethnic majorities (classifying most of the Slavic settlements as Macedonian), and number of households. The data was collected as part of the ethnographic research made during the Macedonian expedition by the Russian Academy of Sciences in 1900, in which Misirkov was invited to participate in his native village, by his professor Petr Alekseevich Lavrov. The journal was confiscated by the Russian authorities in 1905. According to historian Blaže Ristovski, its orthography was almost the same as the orthography of standard Macedonian.

=== Diary ===
The last page of Misirkov's diary of 1913

In 2006, a handwritten diary by Misirkov during his stay in Russia in 1913 was discovered in Sofia. It has been recognized as authentic by Bulgarian and Macedonian experts, was published in 2008, and translated into Macedonian and Bulgarian. In the diary, Misirkov identified himself as a Macedonian Bulgarian and had a Bulgarian nationalist stance. He criticized Russia's "Slavic solidarity" in the Second Balkan War as "the most shameful act in the history of Slavism", while also condemning the "anti-Slavic coalition" of Serbia with Greece, Romania and Turkey in the "destruction of heroic Bulgaria", the division of Macedonian territories and the "extermination of the Slavic people". He also criticized Russia and France for their support of Serbia and Romania and their lack of efficient support for Bulgaria. The manuscript includes 381 pages written in the Russian language. Misirkov wrote it in Klimentove, where he lived and worked at the time. It also contains articles and excerpts from the Russian press from that time. The discovery of his diary gave rise to public discussion over Misirkov's stances on Bulgarian and Macedonian ethnicity. Per Heraclides, Misirkov's stance was not clear-cut and he sounded Macedonian at times too.

=== Dialectology and ethnography ===
As a philologist, he was fluent in Russian, Bulgarian, Serbo-Croatian, Romanian, Lithuanian, Czech, Polish, English, German, French, modern Greek, Esperanto, and was a scholar of the Ido language. He used a similar orthographical system to Vuk Karadžić's system. The main differences from Karadžić's system were Misirkov's use of the apostrophe for palatal consonants rather than a ligature, such as n', l', k', g', but he also used iota (i) rather than j. Misirkov opposed the use of j, apparently seeing it as foreign to the Cyrillic script. Misirkov's system was not widely known or used then.

He drew the border between the Serbian language and Bulgarian language in the west to Kolubara and the left tributaries of Ibar. Per him, in the east and south, dialects were spoken, far from Serbian and close to "the Shopian and Skopje dialects, that these dialects were spoken by tribes closer to those Slavs from whom the Bulgarian kingdom was formed". Misirkov classified the population in Pomoravlje as autochthonous and Bulgarian by origin, excluding any later migrations during the Ottoman rule from Bulgaria. In terms of folklore, Misirkov maintained the Bulgarian character of the works about Krali Marko.

=== Articles ===
Misirkov wrote his articles in Macedonian, Russian and Bulgarian, publishing them in Russia and Bulgaria. Most of the articles were signed with his birth name, but some of them used his pseudonym "K. Pelski". In his article "Economic Reasons for the Macedonian Movement", published in Russian in St. Petersburg, he wrote about Bulgarians in the Manastir vilayet. In the article "Nationality of the Macedonian People" published in Sofia in May 1924, in the journal of the Macedonian emigrants, 20 July, he defined Macedonians as greater Bulgarians than Bulgarians themselves in Bulgaria proper and expressed his disagreement with the Serbian identity imposed on the Macedonians. He argued that it is due to the refusal to accept the Serbian identity that the Macedonians used to be called Bulgarians, and this is how they want to be called in the future. Misirkov further wrote: "We will be Macedonians rather than Bulgarians, but Macedonians with a self-consciousness other than your Serbian-national one, with a historical past of our own, with a literary language of our own, alongside the Bulgarian one, with a Macedonian-Bulgarian national school of our own, with a national church of our own, in which the national and religious sentiment of Macedonia is not offended by the face and spirit of Serbian saints such as 'St. Sava'." He concluded: "Whether we call ourselves Bulgarians or Macedonians, we always recognize ourselves as a separate, unified, completely distinct from the Serbs and with a Bulgarian consciousness of nationality." In that period, Misirkov proposed the unification of all Macedonians into a Macedonian Switzerland of the Balkans and the adoption of the Ido language, which would be a Macedonian variant of Esperanto – a language that would be used for communication with the Western world and between all Macedonians (Bulgarians, Aromanians (Vlachs), Albanians, Turks and Greeks). Misirkov also published articles about the economic deprivation of locals and rapid transformations of their traditional family communities pressured by the emerging modes of capitalist exchanges.

Serbophobia has been also featured in Misirkov's works. For him: "The Serbs seized and buried the largest share of our beautiful homeland... They are the most treacherous and cruel of all the heirs of Turkish rule in Macedonia... They took away our right to call ourselves Bulgarians, even Macedonians". Misirkov also referred to St. Sava as "the national saint and inspirer and leader of the Greater Serbian idea..." Per Misirkov, the celebration of St. Sava was imposed on the locals, who were not allowed to celebrate their national holidays, are spoke of a Bulgarian national culture that has existed for centuries. He argued that the Slavic population of Macedonia was not "a formless paste" but a "well baked Bulgarian bread". In the preface to Notes on South Slavic Philology and History, he wrote:

The readers of this article will probably be surprised by the huge contradiction they will encounter in it compared to what they have read or can read in my brochure "On Macedonian Affairs". To guess this contradiction, it is enough to recall that I acted as an improvised politician there. This "policy" was supposed to neutralize Macedonian interests in the Balkan states and prove the ethnic and historical individuality of the Macedonians. But since in this "policy" they could see the "manner" of the Bulgarian government, not a few unnecessary harsh words were uttered against the latter. These superfluous "proofs" that my thoughts were not at all the manner of the Bulgarian government, but of an improvised "politician" on the Macedonian question, as well as the entire content of the brochure, were so far removed from impartial science that I considered it extremely inconvenient in my two-month stay in Sofia to meet with any of Sofia's philologists and historians.

However, in 1924 Misirkov changed his views again. He wrote an article where he referred to himself as a Macedonian. In the article, Misirkov argued for a distinct Macedonian history and culture, and ideal for independent Macedonia. He rejected the claims of Bulgarian and Serbian scholars that the "Turanian-Bulgars" and the Serbian Nemanjić dynasty rescued medieval Macedonian Slavs from "Grecisation", and contended that Bulgarians and Serbs appropriated Macedonian history and culture. Misirkov also wrote that he did not regret declaring himself for Macedonian separatism and that his Macedonian patriotism defeats his Bulgarian patriotism. In the article "The Path of Reconciliation" from January 1925, he wrote: "The Macedonian national feeling and national awareness are as old as the Bulgarian and the Serbian are." In another article called "Macedonian nationalism", Misirkov stressed that the "Macedonian intelligentsia sought and found other means to fight with, namely an independent Macedonian scientific thought and Macedonian national consciousness." In the same article, Misirkov also referred to his Bulgarian patriotism. In March 1925, he advocated for transforming Macedonia into a bridge between Serbs and Bulgarians within a future "better" Yugoslavia. Misirkov wrote in the article "School and socialism" from May 1925, explicitly acknowledging his past as a Bulgarian student at Petrograd University: "In 1897 I went to Petrograd University and for five years was among the Bulgarian studentship as Bulgarian and member of the Bulgarian Student Society... We, the Bulgarians...", etc.

== Legacy ==
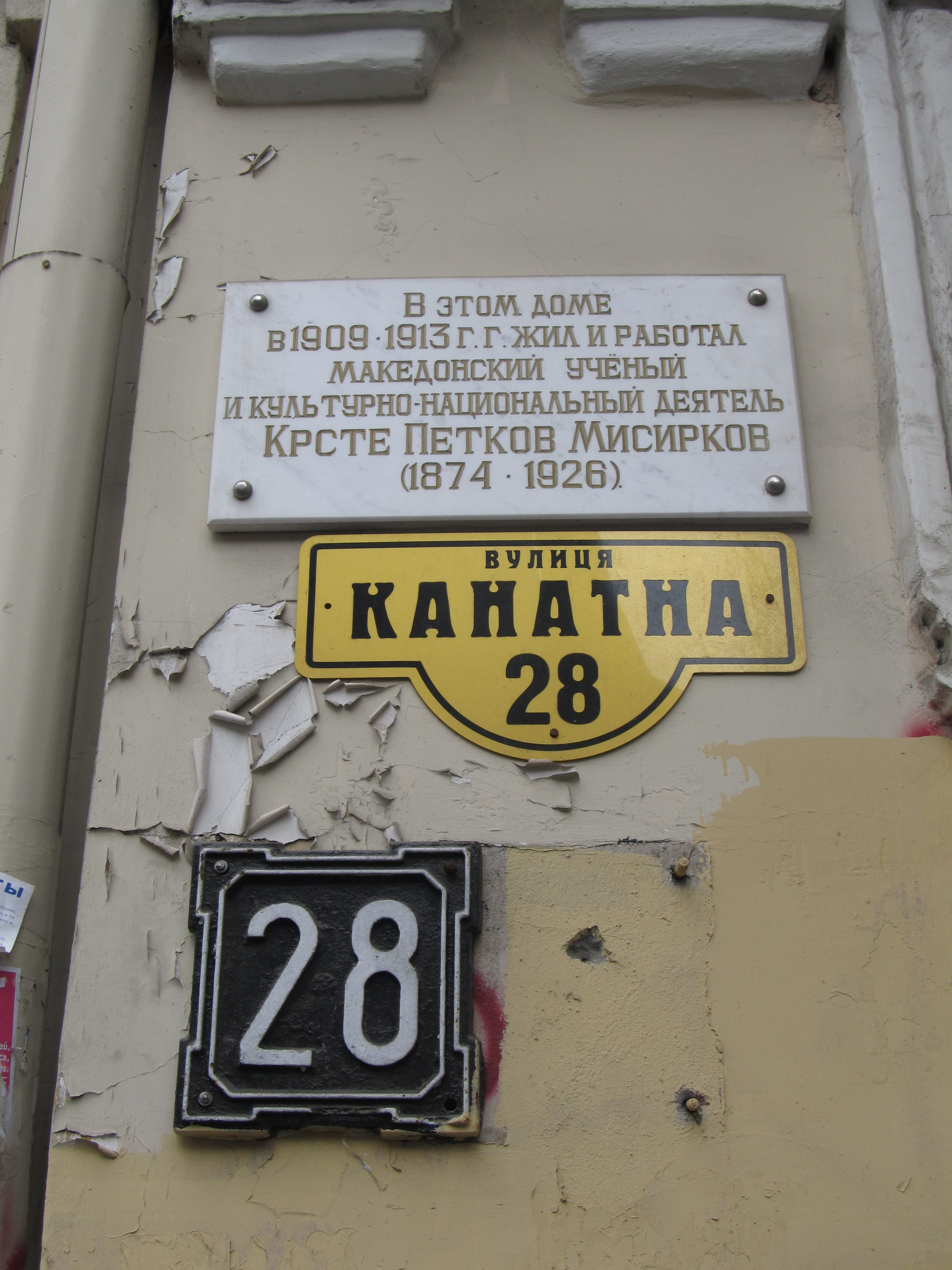
This plaque in Odesa, Ukraine, indicates the house where he lived and worked from the period 1909–1913.

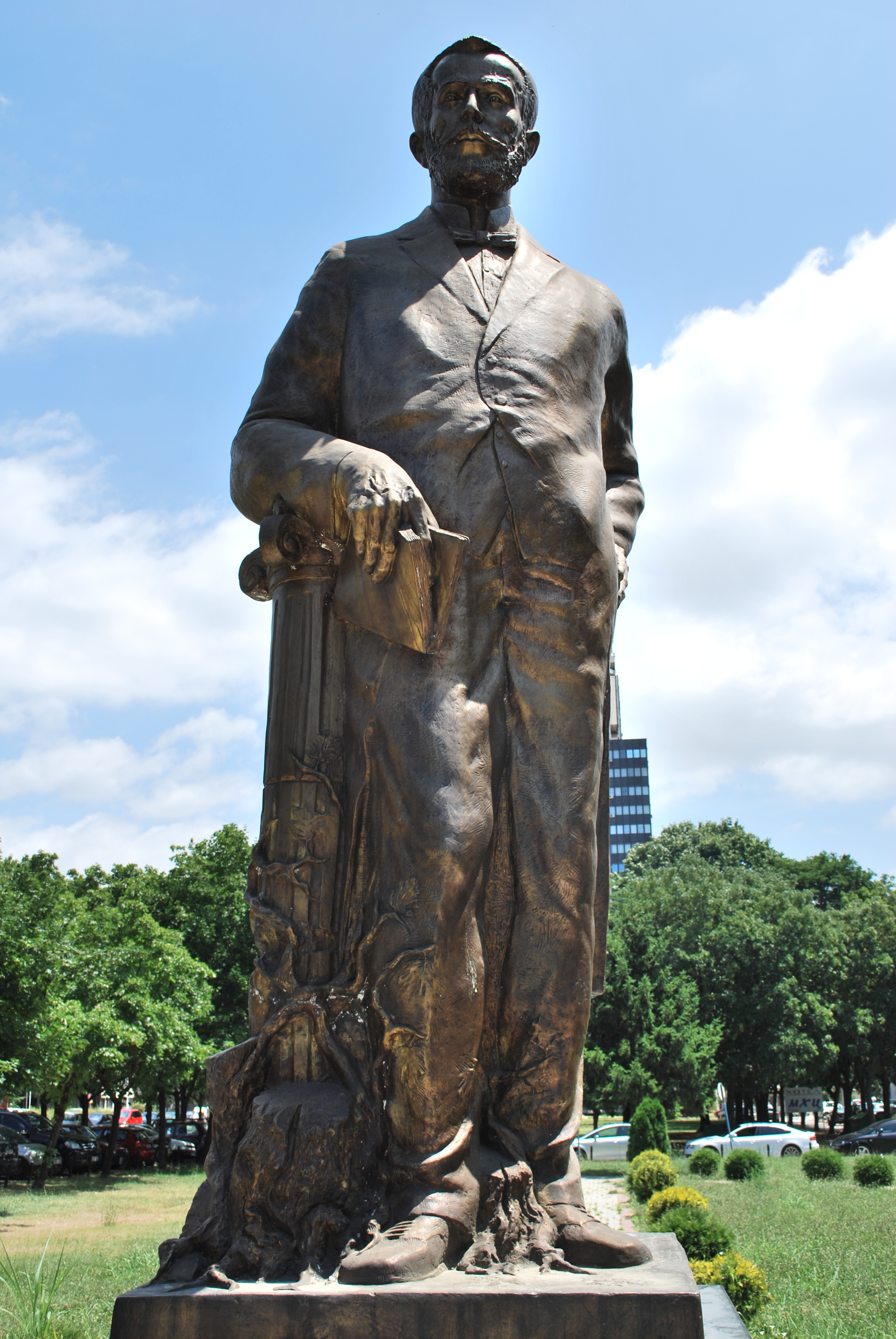
Monument of Misirkov in front of the Macedonian Academy of Sciences and Arts in Skopje.

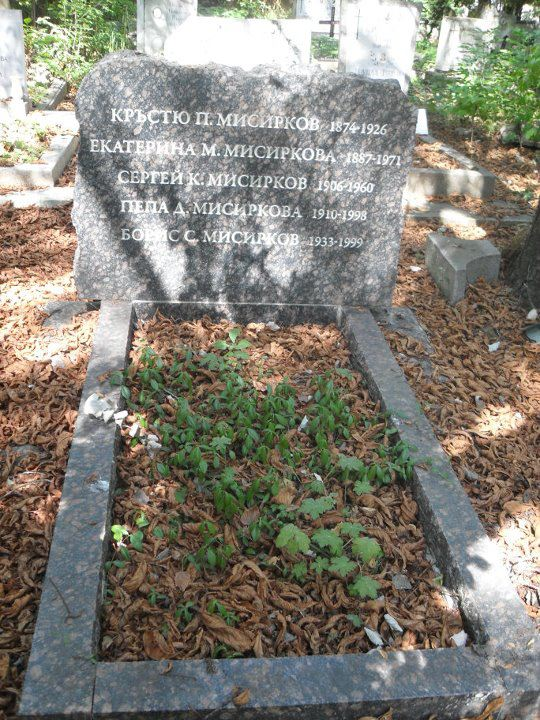
Grave in Sofia

Misirkov was re-discovered in the post-World War II era. His principles were used in the orthography adopted as part of the new Macedonian standard language in 1945, but the Serbian ligatures nj and lj were adopted, as well as j, and the acute rather than the apostrophe in k and g. As such, he is considered "the founder of the modern Macedonian literary language". A memorial plaque on the house where Misirkov lived in Odesa was revealed during the Days of Science of the Republic of Macedonia in Odesa in 2008. Because Misirkov expressed conflicting statements about the ethnicity of the Slavs living in Macedonia, including his own ethnicity, it led to different interpretations between Bulgarian and Macedonian historians. While Misirkov’s legacy has been controversial, there have been attempts among international scholars to reconcile his self-contradictory statements. Thus, per Croatian-American historian Ivo Banac, Misirkov espoused pan-Bulgarian patriotism, furthermore frontally, against the Serbs and the Greeks before them, but in the context of the larger Bulgarohone nation, which was more philologically understood than in an ethnic way, he espoused Macedonian patriotism and sought cultural and national differentiation, separating the Macedonians.

=== North Macedonia ===
In North Macedonia, Misirkov is regarded as the forefather of the Macedonian nation. Ristovski described him as "the most eminent, most significant and more versatile cultural and national worker before liberation". He was recognized as the greatest Macedonian of the 20th century by the Macedonian public in the 2000s in a survey by the newspaper Vreme. Misirkov is regarded as the author of the first scientific magazine in Macedonian. After World War II, the new Macedonian historiography started to regard Misirkov's persona highly. His work and ideas, especially On Macedonian Matters, became a major field of exploration for scholars from the Macedonian Academy of Sciences and Arts, who used them as a basis to support the claim that there was a Macedonian national consciousness as early as the 19th century. The Institute for Macedonian language "Krste Misirkov" has been named after him since 1953. The Macedonian historiography sees his work as a scientific continuation of Gjorgji Pulevski's work. Macedonian organizations, such as the association of writers, have unsuccessfully lobbied for the transfer of the remains of Misirkov from Bulgaria to North Macedonia. His grandson, Boris Misirkov, said that he and his family are not interested in the proposed transfer.

There was a debate about Misirkov's ethnicity in North Macedonia issued by Rastislav Terzioski, who brought to light memos from Russian archives which clearly stated his pro-Bulgarian positions. The publication of his 1913 diary, which revealed his pro-Bulgarian views, sparked a major controversy in Skopje. The Social Democratic Union of Macedonia called for the dismissal of Zoran Todorovski, who was then director of the State Archives of Macedonia. Macedonian scholars have dismissed any dillemma about his national identity. Regarding Misirkov's signature as a "Macedonian Bulgarian", a Macedonian philologist argued:

The signature Macedonian Bulgarian only points to the historical context of the non-existence of an independent Macedonian state. All this is just taken out of context, from a linguistic aspect the phrase can certainly be commented on, it is one thing to be a citizen somewhere, it is another to belong ethnically to someone and have the feeling. Misirkov in many missions, before the end of his life, when he says, the feeling that I am Macedonian should be the highest of all in the world.

Ristovski said that Misirkov's support of the unification of Macedonia with Bulgaria did not reflect his genuine beliefs and sentiments, but was dictated by the conditions of the time. Also per Ristovski, based on the testimony of Misirkov's son and grand-daughter, when Misirkov lived in Sofia, and particularly in Bessarabia, he had to assist the Bulgarians because they were more numerous compared to the Macedonians, who were few. Per Macedonian revisionist historian Zoran Todorovski, the Macedonian historiography deliberately concealed Misirkov's behavior and writings during the Balkan Wars.

=== Bulgaria ===
In Bulgaria, he is regarded as a Bulgarian patriot. In the critique of his 1903 book, Aleksandar Teodorov-Balan stressed the danger of ignoring Misirkov's "Macedonian theory" and urged the Bulgarian government to prevent its spread because it could lead to the "estrangement of the Macedonian Bulgarians, and establishment of a new Slavic literature and new spiritual culture in general for the Slavs in Macedonia". He criticized Misirkov's stance which treated the Macedonian Slavs as different from Bulgarians. Misirkov's son, Sergey, in 1936 on the occasion of the 10th anniversary of his death, in Bulgaria, wrote: "It must be said that K. P. Misirkov lived his entire life with the joys and worries of the Bulgarian people, and everything that concerned Bulgaria and the Bulgarian nation found the most vivid echo in his deeply patriotic soul." However, in 1946, he wrote: "Misirkov's ideas are today embodied in the very life of the existence of the People's Republic of Macedonia. His creativity must be sought out, studied and popularized. This is in the interest of the entire Macedonian people". The last leader of IMRO, Ivan Mihaylov, wrote: "Misirkov sometimes declares himself a student of the Serb Novaković, sometimes speaks of Macedonian culture, but in the end and in general he remains an almost fanatical Bulgarian. His misfortune is that he is inconsistent in his various political wanderings and that very often one gets the impression that he even thinks like a crazy person... In short, this is the notorious Misirkov, whom the handful of traitors to the Bulgarian people, mostly scholarship holders of the Serbian King Alexander, tried to proclaim as some kind of prophet-forerunner for the non-existent Macedonian nation." Academic Hristo Hristov maintained that "Kr. Misirkov is imbued with deep hatred and aversion to the Bulgarian people. This is understandable considering that he is a protege of the Serbian chauvinist organization "St. Sava" and the Serbian Ministry of Foreign Affairs".

The Bulgarian press criticized his separatism. Per a student of his in Bitola, Dragan Zografov: "Misirkov aroused in my adolescent soul only admiration as a man of science. Later, he became antipathetic to me with his separatist ideas, I considered him a mischief-maker for the sacred cause of Macedonia... I believe, I am convinced that during a certain period of his life he was mistaken and, although unintentionally, he did harm to our ideal - a free Macedonia, but a Macedonia with a Bulgarian character, and not some dubious country in national terms". In a written note by academic Nikola Traykov about a conversation with Misirkov's friend from St. Petersburg, Petko Stoyanov, conducted on 3 March 1963, where he said about his last conversation with Misirkov in 1923: "There was also talk about the brochure from 1903 "On Macedonian Affairs" Misirkov justified himself and admitted that he had made a mistake. His explanations for his activities from a later time were naive, with many exaggerations. According to Professor [Stoyanov], Misirkov was displaying mania. "One should not, he told me, idealize Misirkov." Per Bulgarian sources, Misirkov was influenced by the ideas of Stojan Novaković, who was a proponent of Macedonism to promote Serbian interests in the region of Macedonia. According to Bulgarian observers, after the breakup of Yugoslavia, polemics have also arisen in the Republic of Macedonia about the identity of Misirkov. Per historian Chris Kostov, he abandoned the ideas of his 1903 book.

== See also ==
- History of the Macedonian language
- Macedonian studies
