= Slavko Milosavlevski =

Macedonian sociologist (1928–2012)

Secretary of the Presidency of the League of Communists of Macedonia
- In office 20 March 1969 – 29 October 1972
- President: Angel Čemerski
- Preceded by: Angel Čemerski
- Succeeded by: Boro Denkov

Personal details
- Born: 28 January 1928 Vratnica, Kingdom of Serbs, Croats and Slovenes
- Died: 14 October 2012 (aged 84) Vratnica, Macedonia
- Party: League of Communists of Yugoslavia (LCY); League of Communists of Macedonia (LCM)

Slavko Milosavlevski (Macedonian: Слaвко Милосaвлевски; January 28, 1928 – October 14, 2012) was a Macedonian sociologist, politician and dissident during the communist period.

== Life ==
Milosavlevski was born in Vratnica in the Tetovo region on January 28, 1928. He finished primary school in his native village and high school in Skopje. He actively participated in World War II in Yugoslav Macedonia. Milosavlevski completed his undergraduate studies at the Faculty of Law in Skopje in 1957. He completed postgraduate studies at the Institute of Social Sciences in Belgrade in 1960. In 1961/1962, he studied at the University Institute of European Studies in Turin, where he became familiar with Eurocommunism and the Italian Socialist Party of Pietro Nenni. He also developed ideas of Eurocommunism. Milosavlevski received his PhD from the Faculty of Law in Skopje in 1965. Milosavlevski was the first to teach a course in sociology at the Faculty of Law at the University of Skopje from 1961 to 1974. He was an initiator for creation of the Institute for Sociological, Political, and Juridical Research. Milosavlevski was also a member of the League of Communists of Macedonia (LCM) and League of Communists of Yugoslavia (LCY). Milosavlevski was a liberal politician and part of the younger generation of politicians. In the late 1960s, Milosavlevski became a leading advocate of the movement to transform the federal government into an interrepublican agency. He was a member of the Executive Committee of the Central Committee of the LCY from 1966 to 1969 and secretary of the Secretariat of the Central Committee of LCY from 1969 to 1972. He resigned at the 36th session from the Central Committee of LCM in January 1973. He held senior political positions in SR Macedonia and SFR Yugoslavia, but was forced to resign from all political positions in LCM and LCY in 1974 due to not adhering to the official political ideology. He was expelled from academia, remaining in isolation until the early 1990s after the rise of political pluralism. Milosavlevski died in 2012.

== Works ==
Milosavlevski's book Introduction to Sociology was published in 1967 and became a textbook for students at the Faculty of Law in Skopje. It was the first Macedonian sociological textbook. The book aimed to give an overview of social thought from antiquity to the rise of Marxism. It also discussed topics such as the characteristics of nations, the specificities of European nations, and Yugoslavia's national question. The book also covered political and legal aspects, cultural aspects, economic aspects, and national minorities, etc.

Milosavlevski criticised the official political ideology in his works from the 1960s and 1970s, including Revolution and Democracy (1967), Election System, Elective Democracy in Practice (1968), Revolution and Antirevolution (1972), and his doctoral dissertation, "The League of Communists of Yugoslavia in the System of Socialist Democracy in Yugoslavia", which he defended at the Faculty of Law in Skopje in 1965.

== See also ==
- Sociology in North Macedonia
