= Irena Stefoska =

Macedonian historian and politician (born 1967)

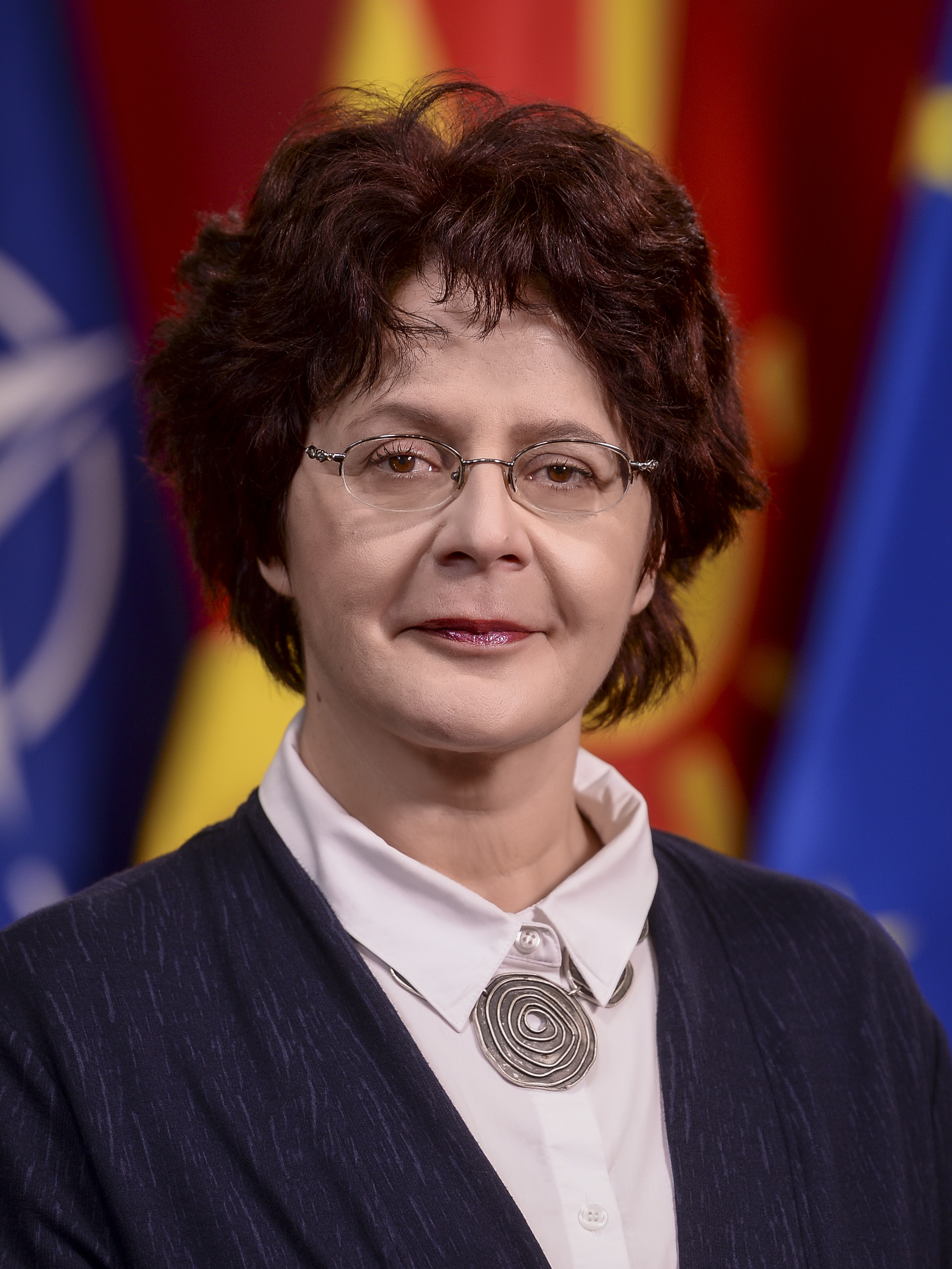
Stefoska in 2020

Irena Stefoska (born 16 September 1967 in Skopje) is a Macedonian historian and politician. She has been a Member of Parliament of North Macedonia (2016–2020) and was Minister of Culture from 2020 to 2022, when her successor was Bisera Kostadinovska-Stojcevska).

== Life ==
Stefoska has a degree (1991) from the Institute of Classical Studies of Ss. Cyril and Methodius University of Skopje, master's degrees from Central European University in Budapest (1994) and the Faculty of Philosophy, University of Belgrade (2001), and a PhD (2007) from Skopje's Institute of History at the Faculty of Philosophy.

She has held a Fulbright Scholarship and a Robert Bosch Stiftung Fellowship in Historical Dialogue and Accountability at Columbia University, United States, and been a research professor at Brown University in the US from 2009 to 2010. Stefoska also spent time at the Georg Eckart Institute in Braunschweig, Germany. Before becoming Minister of Culture she was a full time professor of the Institute of National History at Skobje.

== Politics ==
Stefoska became a member of Parliament of North Macedonia in 2016. From 2016 to 2020 she chaired the Parliamentary Committee on Culture and the group for cooperation with the Greek Parliament. She was appointed Minister of Culture in August 2020, replacing Husni Ismaili.

Stefoska claimed her three priorities as Minister to be “European integration, cultural heritage and young people”. She also claimed that culture is not a luxury but rather an “important strategic investment’ for the benefit of society. In 2021 the opposition party, Alternative, accused Stefoska of discriminating against Albanian artists. Stefoska was replaced as Minister in 2022 by Bisera Kostadinovska-Stojcevska).

== Selected publications ==
- Stefoska, Irena; Stojanov, Darko (May 2017). "A tale in stone and bronze: old/new strategies for political mobilization in the Republic of Macedonia". Nationalities Papers. 45 (3): 356–369. doi:10.1080/00905992.2017.1308346.
- Stefoska, Irena; Stojanov, Darko (1 January 2016). "Remembering and forgetting the SFR Yugoslavia. Historiography and history textbooks in the Republic of Macedonia". Südosteuropa. 64 (2): 206–225. doi:10.1515/soeu-2016-0016. S2CID 163761823.
- Irena Stefoska (4 December 2017), Constructing the Image of the ‘Threatening Neighbour’ in Macedonian History Textbooks, pp. 249–256, doi:10.14220/9783737008112.249, Wikidata Q133698608
- Irena Stefoska (2008). "Two names of a city: Strumica - Tiberioupolis". Zbornik Radova Vizantološkog Instituta (45): 77–87. doi:10.2298/ZRVI0845077S. ISSN 0584-9888. Wikidata Q133698609.
- Irena Stefoska; Saše Tasev (1 January 2001), The Challenges of the Polylogue. Towards Miglena Nikolchina, Meaning and Matricide: Предизвиците на полилогот. Кон Миглена Николчина, Смисла и мајкоубиство, vol. 1, pp. 236–237, doi:10.51151/IDENTITIES.V1I1.28, Wikidata Q133698610
