= Secret Macedonian-Adrianople Circle =

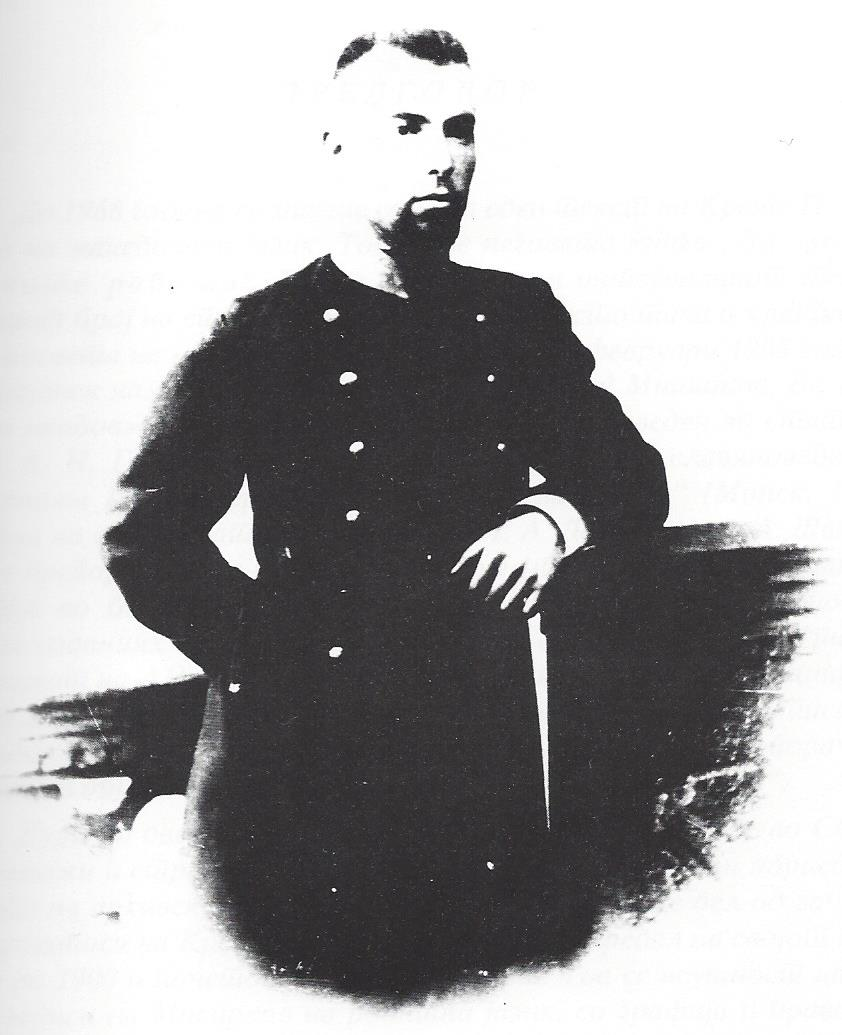
Krste Misirkov in 1899

The Secret Macedonian-Adrianople Circle was founded in St. Petersburg in 1900. Members of it were Bulgarian students in the Russian Empire. Its purpose, according to its founding protocol, was: "To support the Macedonian cause materially and morally and, according to its capabilities, to monitor its development." One of the founders of the circle was Krste Misirkov, who, when he moved to St. Petersburg in 1902, became its chairman.

The circle was in direct contacts with the Supreme Macedonian-Adrianople Committee in Bulgaria, to which it reported on its activities. Misirkov presented his motives for the creation of the circle to the chairman of the Supreme Macedonian-Adrianople Committee in Sofia as follows: "It is known that there is no Bulgarian who is not interested in the situation and fate of that part of our fatherland, which to this day groans under the yoke of Turkey."

In the period 1902-1903, the circle contacted with the Central Committee of the Internal Macedonian-Adrianople Revolutionary Organization. Subsequently, the circle grew into the Macedonian-Adrianople Student Society, with divisions in cities in Russia where Bulgarian students attended. The club existed until 1906, when it merged with the All-Bulgarian Student Association, ceasing its independent activity.

== See also ==
- Macedonian Question
- Secret society
