= Carsten Wieland =

German political consultant and journalist

Carsten Wieland is a political consultant and journalist, specialized in Middle Eastern affairs, he has written a number of books concerning Syria and the Syrian civil war.

== Biography ==
Carsten Wieland was born in 1971 in Mannheim, southwest Germany. At present he works as a political consultant in Europe and the United States.

== Works ==
- Syria at Bay: Secularism, Islamism and "Pax Americana", 2006.
- Syria - A Decade of Lost Chances: Repression and Revolution from Damascus Spring to Arab Spring
- The Syrian Uprising: Dynamics of an Insurgency, 2013.
- Syria: Ballots Or Bullets?: Democracy, Islamism, and Secularism in the Levant, 2006.
