= Postmodernist anthropology =

Postmodern theory (PM) in anthropology originated in the 1960s, along with the literary postmodern movement in general. Anthropologists working in this vein of inquiry seek to dissect, interpret and write cultural critiques.

One issue discussed by PM anthropologists is about subjectivity; because ethnographies are influenced by the disposition of the author, should their opinions be considered scientific? Clifford Geertz, considered a founding member of postmodernist anthropology, advocates that, “anthropological writings are themselves interpretations, and second and third order ones to boot” In the 21st century, some anthropologists use a form of standpoint theory; a person's perspective in writing and cultural interpretation of others is guided by their own background and experiences.

Other major tenets of postmodernist anthropology are:

- an emphasis on including the opinions and perspectives of the people being studied,
- cultural relativism as a method of inquiry
- skepticism towards the claims of science to producing objective and universally valid knowledge
- the rejection of grand, universal schemes or theories which explain other cultures (Barrett 1996).

A critique of anthropologists has been to question whether anthropologists may speak/write on behalf of cultural others, a point made by James Clifford in his book Writing Culture: the Poetics and Politics of Ethnography (1986). Margery Wolf states that, “it would be as great a loss to have first-world anthropologists confine their research to the first world as it is (currently) to have third-world anthropologists confine theirs to the third world”. In the 21st century, the question has been resolved by pointing out that all cultural descriptions are of cultural others. All ethnographic writing is done by a person from one standpoint writing about others living in a different standpoint. Thus, the notion of anthropologists as 'culture brokers' (see Richard Kurin) has been adopted to explain why anthropologists from any given country write about cultural others.
