= Todor Petrov =

Macedonian politician (born 1960)

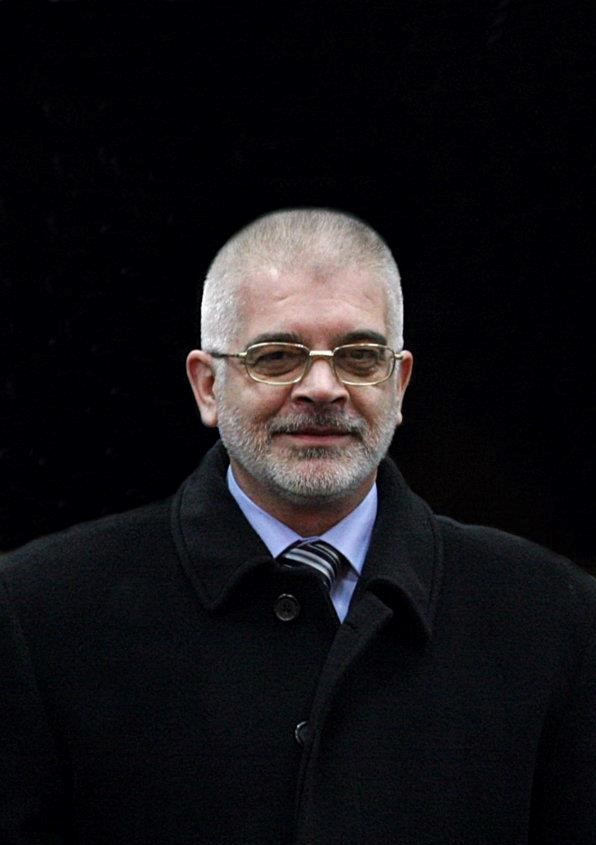

President of World Macedonian Congress
- Incumbent
- Assumed office 15 September 1990

Member of the Assembly of the Republic of Macedonia
- In office 1990–1994

Personal details
- Born: 19 March 1960 (age 66) Gevgelija, SR Macedonia, SFR Yugoslavia
- Party: Independent
- Education: Ss. Cyril and Methodius University

Todor Petrov (born 19 March 1960) is the president of the Macedonian diaspora organisation World Macedonian Congress (WMC). Petrov is a councillor in the electorate of Gazi Baba.

== Life ==
The flag of the Republic of Macedonia between 1992 and 1995, bearing the Vergina Sun

Todor Petrov was born on 19 March 1960 in Gevgelija. He finished his primary and high school in Gevgelija, then he attended the Ss. Cyril and Methodius University of Skopje where he earned a bachelor's degree in economics.

In 1990, Petrov founded the World Macedonian Congress (WMC), a Macedonian diaspora organisation, and became its president. In 1990, during the first democratic elections Todor Petrov was elected as the Member of Parliament from Gevgelija. He was one of three members of the Assembly elected as independent candidates. During his four years as a member of the Assembly of the Republic of Macedonia, he made over 2000 amendments, which make him the biggest amendment proposer in the Assembly. In 1992, after the Republic of Macedonia became independent, Petrov successfully proposed the Vergina Sun symbol as the official flag of the country. In the same year, the country displayed the symbol on its new flag. This lasted until 1995, when the Republic of Macedonia changed its flag as part of the Interim Accord with Greece.

Petrov used to be chairman of the weekly newspaper Makedonsko Sonce, where he promoted the Macedonian cause.

In 2004, Todor Petrov and World Macedonian Congress initiated 2004 Macedonian autonomy referendum, against a government plan to change some administrative divisions which was a consequence of the Ohrid Agreement ending the 2001 insurgency. The government proposal planned to reduce the number of municipalities from 123 to 84, giving greater representation to ethnic Albanians and turning the capital city of Skopje into a bilingual city. Four days before the vote, the United States announced they would start referring to the country as the Republic of Macedonia rather than the former Yugoslav Republic of Macedonia, in a move said to strengthen the government position. Although 95% voted in favour of the change, the voter turnout of 27% was well below the 50% threshold, and the referendum was unsuccessful.

In 2009, Todor Petrov applied to be a candidate of VMRO-DPMNE in the presidential election. He was not able to secure his candidacy at the party's convention, and VMRO-DPMNE appointed Gjorge Ivanov as the party's presidential candidate, who later became President of the Republic of Macedonia.

In March 2016, Petrov used a megaphone which had neo-Nazi marking "SS 14 88" (Schutzstaffel, Fourteen Words, Heil Hitler) written on it in a nationalist rally, which was condemned by European Union mediator Peter Vanhoutte. In March 2022, Petrov claimed that the United States owned bio-labs in Ukraine as a classic spin attempt to defend the Russian invasion there.

== See also ==
- Macedonian Prayer
