= World Macedonian Congress =

Macedonian diaspora organization

- Светски Македонски Конгрес
- Abbreviation: WMC
- Formation: 15 September 1990
- Type: Non-governmental
- Headquarters: Skopje, North Macedonia
- Location: Worldwide
- Chairman: Todor Petrov
- Honourable Presidents: Gjorgjija Atanasoski; Zan Mitrev
- Vice-Presidents: Ismail Bojda; Borce Stefanovski; Vangel Božinovski; Igor R. Janev, Senator of World Macedonian Congress and its Representative in the UN
- Main organ: General Assembly
- Website: www.smk.mk

The World Macedonian Congress (shortened as WMC or SMK; Macedonian: Светски македонски конгрес, romanized: Svetski makedonski kongres) is a Macedonian diaspora organization based in Skopje. Its aims are to represent the rights and interests of Macedonians domestically and internationally. It is seen as a nationalist or ultranationalist organization by researchers. The organization was registered during the fall of communism, on 15 September 1990 by Todor Petrov, who is also the president of the organization.

== History ==
=== Foundation and ideology ===
The World Macedonian Congress was the second of the two international lobby organizations or World Macedonian Congresses established in the Republic of Macedonia (now North Macedonia) with the disintegration of former Yugoslavia. It was created as a rival to the first World Macedonian Congress (created by John Bitove, Sr., a Canadian-Macedonian businessman with the encouragement of the first president of the Republic of Macedonia, Kiro Gligorov) by the independent politician Todor Petrov and president of the Congress. Petrov claimed the Congress was created partly to replace the "Institute for the Macedonian Diaspora", which had been discredited through its past association with the Yugoslavian secret service.

The organization claims ideological descent from one offshoot of the Macedonian Secret Revolutionary Committee, founded by Georgi Kapchev in Geneva, which sent a call to convene an International Congress, to solve the Macedonian Question in January 1899. This idea is disputed by Bulgarian historians on the grounds that Kapchev was a Bulgarian journalist and lawyer.

International researchers and Macedonian researchers have generally seen the organization as a nationalist or ultranationalist organization. In 2001, the organization called NATO the "New Albanian Terrorist Organization" and blocked a highway to prevent NATO from supplying KFOR. According to Macedonian researcher Cvete Koneska, the organization has generally taken hard nationalist stands on political issues, usually regarding Macedonian foreign policy and the country's issues with Greece and Bulgaria. During the Macedonia naming dispute, the organization stood for ending talks with Greece and continuation of Macedonia's membership in the United Nations under its then constitutional name. It also saw antiquity as a source of Macedonian national identity. Macedonian political scientist Zdravko Savevski labelled the organization as far-right and ultranationalist. Political scientist Ognen Vangelov referred to the organization as right-wing.

=== 2004 referendum ===
In 2004, Todor Petrov and the World Macedonian Congress initiated 2004 referendum against changes of administrative divisions. According to the government proposal of municipal border, which would decrease the percentage of Macedonians, and transform Struga and Kičevo into Albanians dominated cities, as well as make Albanian an official language in the capital Skopje. Prior to the referendum, the U.S. recognized the Republic of Macedonia under its constitutional name. The referendum was held on 7 November. Although 95% voted in favor of the change, the voter turnout of 26% was well below the 50% threshold, and the referendum was unsuccessful.

== See also ==
- Macedonian nationalism
- Makedonsko Sonce
- Antiquization
