= Microflex Inc. =

Microflex Inc. is an international corporation manufacturing flexible metal products based in Ormond Beach, Florida and supplying a wide range of industries, with customers including NASA. It was founded in 1975 by Josif and Gjorgjija 'George' Atanasoski. It was originally located in New Haven, Connecticut, however it was relocated to Ormond Beach, Florida in 1980.

Microflex Inc. manufacture metal hose and braid, metallic expansion joints, bellows, and automotive products.

Microflex Inc. hold the following certificates: ASME Certification, ISO Certification, and PED Certification.
