= Gjorgjija Atanasoski =

Macedonian businessman (born 1952)

Gjorgjija 'George' Atanasoski (Macedonian: Ѓорѓија 'Џорџ' Атанасоски; born February 18, 1952) is a Macedonian businessman and politician. He is the founder of MAK AM International Corporation and Microflex Inc., and president of Makedonska Alijansa, a Macedonian political party.

== Career ==
Gjorgjija Atanasoski left Yugoslavia in 1970 for New York City, United States. Atanasoski started his career as an engineer working for New York University. After being five years in the United States, Atanasoski in 1975 founded Microflex Inc. with his brother Josif, an international corporation manufacturing flexible metal products based in Ormond Beach, Florida, and supplying a wide range of industries, with customers including NASA.

In 1996, Atanasoski co-founded and became president of MAK AM International Corporation, an international trading company mostly concerned with importing and exporting to and from Macedonia.

== Key achievements and awards ==
- Founder of Microflex Inc., (1975)
- member and later secretary of the Macedonian Society of New York (1974–1980)
- elected for President of the World Macedonian Congress of North America, (1992)
- Founder of the first Macedonian international weekly magazine Makedonsko Sonce (Macedonian Sun), (1994)
- former candidate for the President of the Republic of Macedonia, (1994)
- Founder and president of MAK AM International Corporation, (1996)
- Founder and president of the political party Makedonska Alijansa (Macedonian Alliance), (1996)
- Ellis Island Medal of Honor, (2004)

== Political and activist career ==
In 1974, Atansoski became secretary of the Macedonian Society of New York, a Macedonian ex-patriate organization promoting Macedonian culture, history and causes in the USA. He has sponsored many Macedonian cultural events and societies, and lobbies for Macedonian human rights to the US Government and many other bodies. In May 1992 he founded the World Macedonian Congress, consider itself as an organization fighting and demanding for more human rights to ethnic Macedonians on an international level, but is seen as an ultranationalist organization by independent researchers and media. Atanasoski is the president of the North American chapter of the MWC, one of the most influential chapters. His work with the MWC ranges from sponsoring historical studies of Macedonia to co-ordinating humanitarian relief efforts.

On June 24, 1994, Atanasoski founded Makedonsko Sonce, a weekly Macedonian international newspaper, the first non-government-controlled newspaper in Macedonian, open to contributions from all citizens.

In 1994 Atanasoski stood as a candidate for President of Macedonia, on a ticket of democratic and free market principles, and the de-corruption and legalisation of the state, as well as the enhancement of the economic and social development of Macedonia. Since 1996, Atanasoski has been the president of the Makedonska Alijansa (Macedonian Alliance) political party.

On May 14, 2005, Atanasoski has been rewarded with the Ellis Island Medal of Honor.
