= Prophecy of Alexander the Great (1907) =

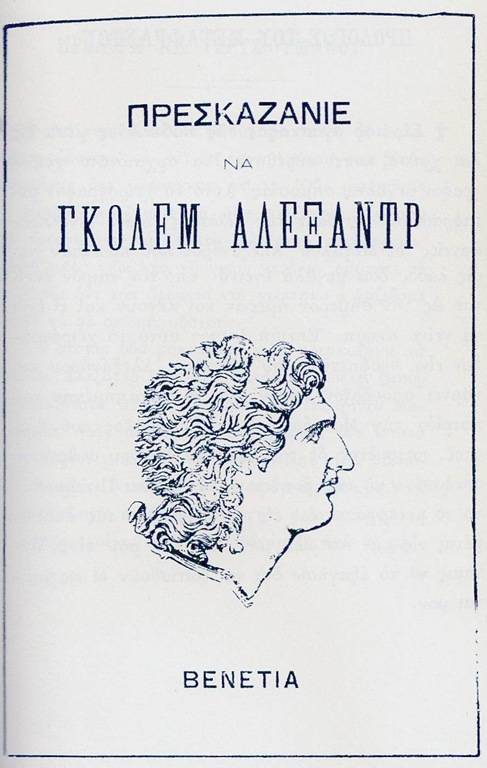
The cover of the pamphlet published in 1907 in Thessaloniki.

The "Prophecy of Alexander the Great" (Πρεσκαζανιε να Γολεμ Αλεζαντρ) is a documented historical literary fabrication and nationalist pamphlet that circulated in the Ottoman region of Macedonia, during early 20th century.

== History ==
It falsely bore an 1845 publication date to bolster regional ethnic and political claims. It was printed using a Slavic Macedonian dialect written in Greek characters. The actual author and editor behind the 1907 hoax was Athanasios Souliotis-Nikolaidis, a prominent Greek intelligence officer, secret agent, and diplomat. In 1905, the Macedonian Committee in Athens published another such pamphlet written in the same way in Slavic Macedonian dialect, but in Greek characters: "Proclamation of the Hellenic-Macedonian Committee from Athens. For our Macedonian brothers". The main part of the pamphlet presented instructions for the fight against Bulgarisation. At that time, Souliotis was a member of the Athens committee. He arrived in Thessaloniki in 1906 and was assigned the task of creating a local Greek committee. The committee was founded in the same year by Souliotis and its activity was focused on nationalist agitation. Souliotis wrote the text of the pamphlet in Greek, and it was translated into Slavic by two local pro-Greek activists. The pamphlet claimed that local Slavic-speakers in Ottoman Macedonia were the direct descendants of the ancient Macedonians, casting neighboring Bulgarians as enemies. A thesis of the pamphlet was that a Greek revival of ancient Macedonia would be imminent, which would make the region part of the restored empire. It regarded the Slavic-speakers of Macedonia as ignorant and stated that they should embrace Greek culture.

== Purpose ==
Although later circulated and sometimes misattributed or packaged as an authentic 1845 manuscript printed in Venice and translated by monk called Atanas Makedonec from an ancient text found in Babylon, historical analysis reveals the 1907 circulation functioned as a modern ideological tool and political maneuver during the volatile Macedonian Struggle. Greek and local pro-Greek activists utilized such cultural and mythical appeals to detach the identity, language, and lineage of Slavic-speakers in Macedonia from Bulgarian irredentism. Souliotis himself wrote in his memoirs: "We carefully and secretly distributed to the villagers the prophecies of Alexander the Great, translated into the Slavo-Macedonian dialect. Through the explanations of the holy monk Athanasius, we reminded them of what was written in the prophecies of Alexander the Great, helping every intelligent Macedonian to understand that Macedonia would not be able to free itself without Greece." With its content, this book gravitates towards the medieval Alexander Romance. According to some Macedonian historians, this small booklet was published in Venice in 1845, as noted on its cover. Per Blaže Ristovski, the booklet nominally fixed national tendency, making it allegedly the first such work in the period up to 1875. However, Dimitar Ljorovski admitted that this book is a propaganda product of Greek nationalists from the early 20th century.

== See also ==
- Megali idea
- Macedonian issue
- Antiquisation
