= Antiquization =

Macedonian identity politics (2006–2017)

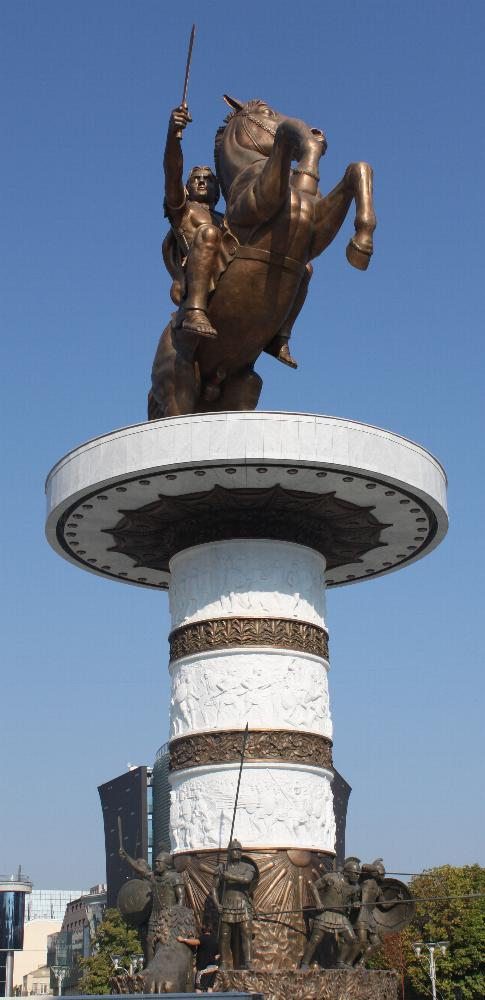
Monument of Alexander the Great (officially "Warrior on Horseback") in Skopje

Antiquization (Macedonian: антиквизација), also sometimes referred as ancient Macedonism (Macedonian: антички македонизам), is a term used mainly to critically describe the identity policies conducted by the nationalist VMRO-DPMNE-led governments of North Macedonia in the period between 2006 and 2017. In the contemporary Macedonian discourse, antiquization refers to the identitarian policies based on the assumption that there is a direct link between today's ethnic Macedonians and Ancient Macedonians. The politics of the ex-Yugoslav era therefore not only embrace the revival of the ancient heritage of the Ancient Macedonians, including the heritage of Philip II and his son Alexander the Great, but also seek to depict a coherent continuity of history and descendancy from the ancient Kingdom of Macedon until the modern Republic of North Macedonia in order to prove the uninterrupted existence of the contemporary Macedonians. Although criticized as causing inter-ethnic and intra-ethnic tensions, even as pseudohistoric, this idea was widespread as of 2019 in North Macedonia.

== Definition ==
The expression "antiquization" originates from the history of arts and describes "the Renaissance practice of giving a city the appearance of ancient Rome or Athens through the introduction of structures organized in the classical mode." Critics use the term "antiquization" in order to reveal "a state-framed set of actions such as direct interventions in the public space and in the public sphere of society in general".

Paeonian tribes and the Kingdom of Macedon. Nearly the whole territory of modern-day North Macedonia lies in the ancient Paeonian Kingdom.

== Narrative referred to as 'antiquization' ==
The narrative promoted by VMRO-DPMNE goes back to the ancient Kingdom of Macedon, continues with personalities from early Christianity, distinguished historical figures who were born in or ruled in or around Skopje and also embraces a group of freedom fighters who struggled for Macedonian independence.

In ancient times Philip II of Macedon was the first who united the Greek city-states and created the basis for the empire which, later on, was expanded by his son, Alexander III of Macedon, also known as Alexander the Great. Alexander's empire is regarded as being important for the spread of Hellenistic culture, arts and sciences in much of the Old World. Modern scholarly discourse has produced several hypotheses about the Macedonians' place within the Greek world, about whether the Ancient Macedonians were Greeks and whether the Ancient Macedonian language was a form of the Greek language or related to it. In parts of the available ancient literature they are described as a Greek tribe, in others the Ancient Macedonians were regarded as barbarians by the Athenians, and who were gradually Hellenized. What the general consensus does agree on is that Philip II was the one who united most of the Greek states, and his son Alexander the Great conquered much of the known world, all the way to India.

In the narrative brought forward by the VMRO-DPMNE, Alexander the Great was clearly not a Greek. According to this version of history, most of the cultural achievements which are perceived as being of Greek origin by historians and laypersons around the world are actually ethnic Macedonian achievements. Therefore, in the view of some, Hellenism's true name would actually be Macedonianism. The Republic of North Macedonia would thus be the owner of great cultural heritage, which always had been denied by the world. And as the then Prime Minister of the Republic of Macedonia Nikola Gruevski put it, it can finally present its true history that has been silenced for so long. North Macedonia, in this view, is seen as the cradle of European civilization.

Moderate Macedonians concede that they speak the Macedonian language, a southern Slavic language and that they are not descendants of the ancient Macedonians. It is the general consensus in historical sciences that Slavic people immigrated into the Balkans and the region of Macedonia around the 6th century. Per the extreme nationalist Macedonian perspective, the modern Macedonians are not Slavs and they are the direct descendants of ancient Macedonians, regarded as non-Greeks. The more moderate Macedonian nationalist perspective is that the Macedonians are the result of the Slavic people who intermingled with the ancient Macedonians.

== Examples ==
Strongly promoted by VMRO-DPMNE politicians, the recollection of Macedonia's heroic past is supported by (pseudo-) scientists, media and civil society efforts. Some historians emphasize the before-mentioned historical continuity; (Note: Vangeli, 2011: 20: "For instance, the newest official "History of the Macedonian People" published by the Institute for National History in 2009, argues that during the interaction of the immigrant Slavs and the native Ancient Macedonians, the ancient features prevailed and defined the development of the region (Ĉepreganov et al.). This resembles a major revision of the Institute's position, which since its foundation, had argued that after the Great Migration, Slavs imposed their culture in the new lands, thus Macedonian culture was Slavic. Mitko Panov, the major author of the chapters on ancient and medieval history, has published a series of articles ("Antiĉkite Makedonci"; "Vizantiskiot kontinuitet") stating that Ancient Macedonians "kept on existing as a people, preserving its ethnic hallmarks and traditions" even in the period of the Great Migration, which influenced the "self-identification" of the immigrant Slavs, even the whole Byzantine culture. He has argued that the political "tendency of the historiography in SFRY based (...) on the relations between Belgrade and Athens" has produced ignorance towards the obvious continuity of Ancient Macedonians (Panov, "Antiĉkite Makedonci")".) archaeologists and linguists present spurious evidence for the resemblance of the language of the ancient Macedonians – a Hellenic language – and the modern Macedonian – a south Slavic language; genealogists offer the alleged scientific proof of the similarity of the DNA of ancient Macedonians and the DNA of the modern Macedonians, (Note: Vangeli, 2011: 20: "Particularly valuable has been the survey by the Swiss project iGenea whose findings were interpreted to prove that "Macedonians have more ancient Macedonian blood" than Greeks, which, on the other hand, have sub-Saharan origin (Aleksovska). While the survey has stirred very positive public reactions, officials have not used it as part of the antiquization process.") whereas their neighboring Greeks have to accept that a blood relationship with the ancient Macedonians cannot be testified.

The extensive cultural politics described by "antiquization" not only describe an identitarian narrative promoted by VMRO-DPMNE. It also supports this narrative with the renaming of important public places, the staging of public events, architectural projects and interference in public education. The former City Stadium was renamed "Philip II Arena". The Skopje International Airport was called "Alexander the Great", just as one of the main motorways, which is part of the pan-European Corridor Nr. 10. A central square in Skopje bears the name "Pella Square" named after Pella, the capital of the ancient kingdom of Macedon. Moreover, traces of so-called "antiquization" can even be found in history schoolbooks. The most explicit, Macedonia's new politics of history become visible in Europe's currently most ambitious urban development project "Skopje 2014". The numerous statues which represent supposed Macedonian heroes, the newly erected triumphal arch Porta Makedonija, the lately constructed buildings for cultural and governmental purposes in neo-Baroque and Neoclassical architecture, the renewed facades of old socialist blocks, the new and the recently redesigned bridges: It all gives the impression of a manifestation of the Macedonian identity politics being carved in stone.

The figures displayed in the project range from Alexander the Great, Justinian I (Emperor of the Roman Byzantine Empire), and Christian missionaries of the 1st millennium to revolutionary characters of the late 19th and early 20th century. According to Valentina Bozinovska, chair woman of the state commission for relations with religious communities, "... the Skopje 2014 project is a statement of all that we have had from the ancient period until today. For the first time we have a chance to create a tangible manifestation of Macedonian identity. ... Civilization practically started here." Greece condemned the statue of Alexander the Great as "provocative", claiming Alexander as exclusively part of its Hellenic heritage. Plaques were placed on such statues after the Prespa Agreement, clarifying that they belong to the ancient Hellenic civilisation.

In addition, new traditions are being (re-)invented in the way that Ancient Macedonian holidays are added or existing holidays expanded with Ancient Macedonian features and/or new ceremonies. Another example fitting into the antiquization narrative is based on an ethnological study in the Hunza Valley of Pakistan, situated in the Pakistani part of the Himalayas. The study revealed that people of the Burusho tribe maintain the legend of being descendants of soldiers of the army of Alexander the Great, and therefore regard North Macedonia as their homeland. As a consequence, in 2008 a delegation of the Hunza royal family visited the Republic of Macedonia and was "welcomed home" by the Prime Minister, the Archbishop of the Macedonian Orthodox Church, the Mayor of Skopje and a flag-waving crowd.

Further, as part of a governmental campaign, videos were broadcast that featured Alexander the Great as the liberator of African and Asian people, saying, it is not Macedonian to retreat. On another occasion the movie "Macedonian Prayer" was broadcast by the state-governed national television at prime time. Being directed by a member of the diaspora organization World Macedonian Congress, this movie claims that the Macedonians were created by God before anyone else and that they constitute the origin of the white race. In 2006, two engineers, one of them a member of the Macedonian Academy of Sciences and Arts (MANU), falsely claimed that the middle text of the Rosetta Stone was written in the Ancient Macedonian language, and that this was the same as an "Aegean dialect" of Slavic Macedonian, when in fact it has long been recognised as Demotic Egyptian.

Analyses of Macedonian textbooks revealed that the recent politics of history have also influenced the knowledge taught in schools. For instance, this is demonstrated in the way the particularity of the ethnic Macedonians throughout the Middle Ages and the Roman era is delineated.

== Historical antiquization ==
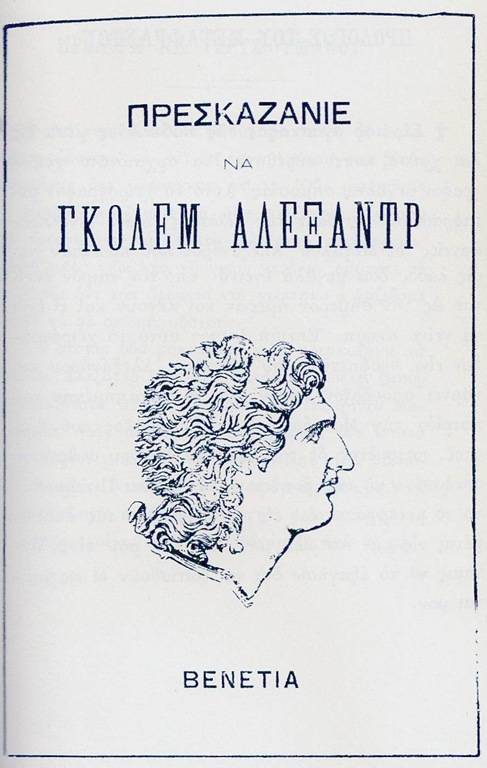
The Prophecy of Alexander the Great (1907) translated into Slav Macedonian by Greek national activists (Megali Idea advocates) in 1907 and issued in Thessaloniki. It was typed with Greek letters and implied to the local Slavs that they were heirs to the ancient Macedonians and part of the Hellenic world that had forgotten its native language.

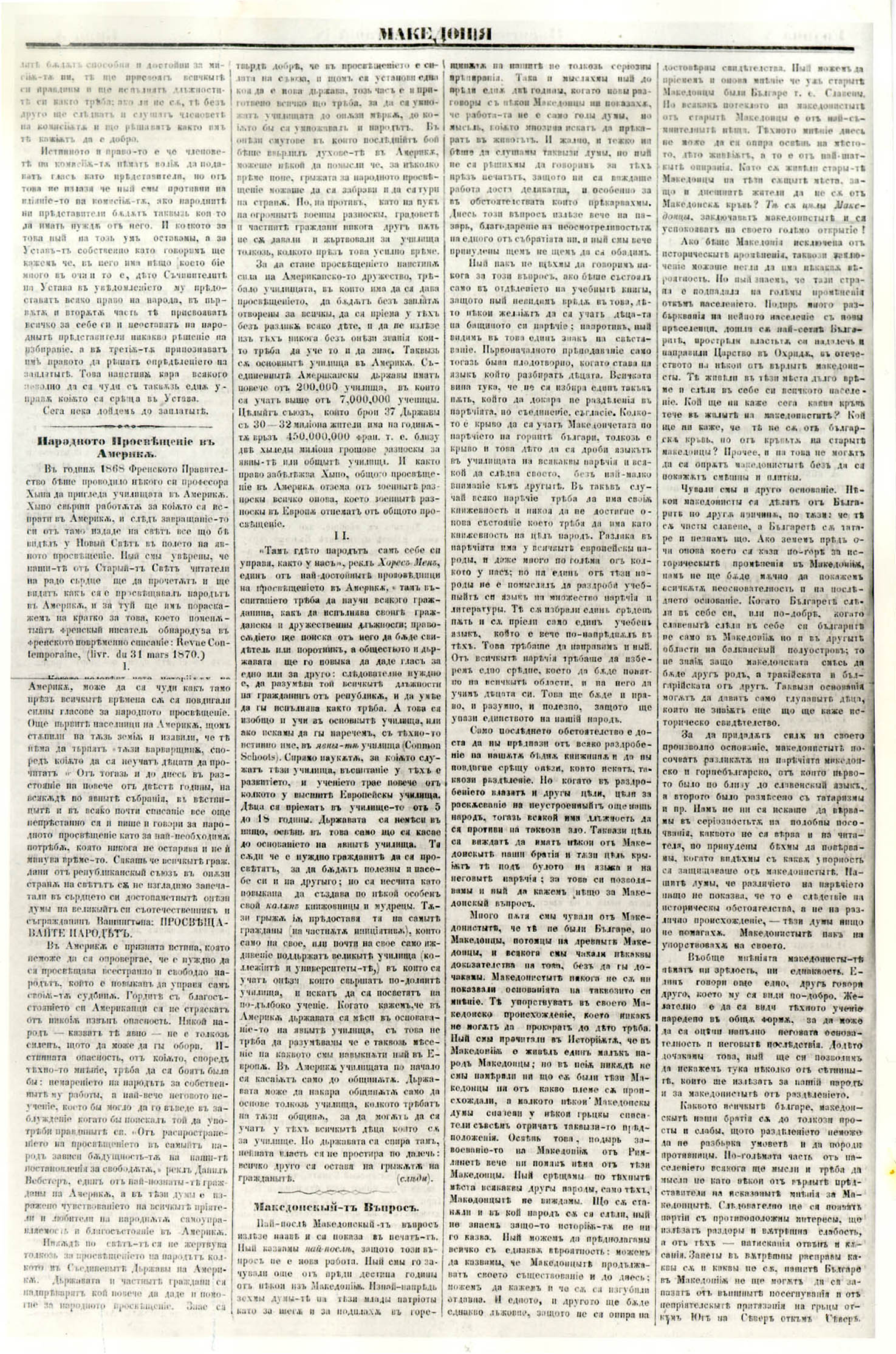
The Macedonian Question an article from 1871 by Petko Slaveykov published in the newspaper Macedonia in Carigrad (now Istanbul). In this article Petko Slaveykov writes: "We have many times heard from the Macedonists that they are not Bulgarians, but they are rather Macedonians, descendants of the Ancient Macedonians, and we have always waited to hear some proofs of this, but we have never heard them."

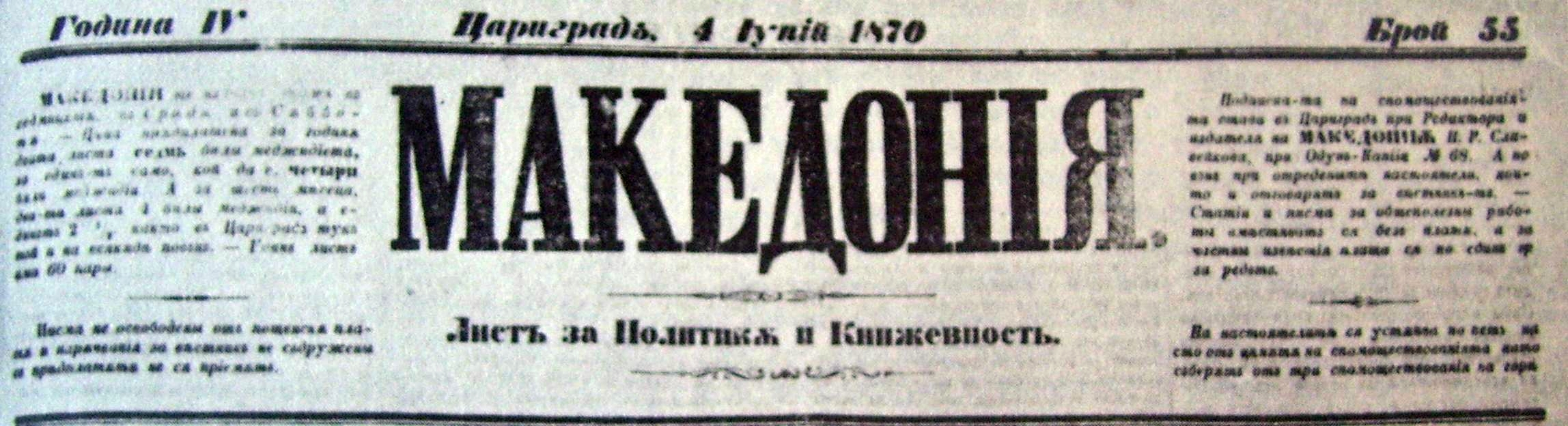
Title page of the 4 July 1870 issue of the Bulgarian newspaper Makedoniya. The newspaper had the title "Macedonia", as its main task per its editor Petko Slaveykov himself, was to educate the misguided (sic): Grecomans in the area, whom he called Macedonists.

Some see the background of antiquization in the nineteenth and early twentieth century and the "myth of ancient descent among Orthodox Slavic speakers in Macedonia, adopted partially due to Greek cultural inputs."

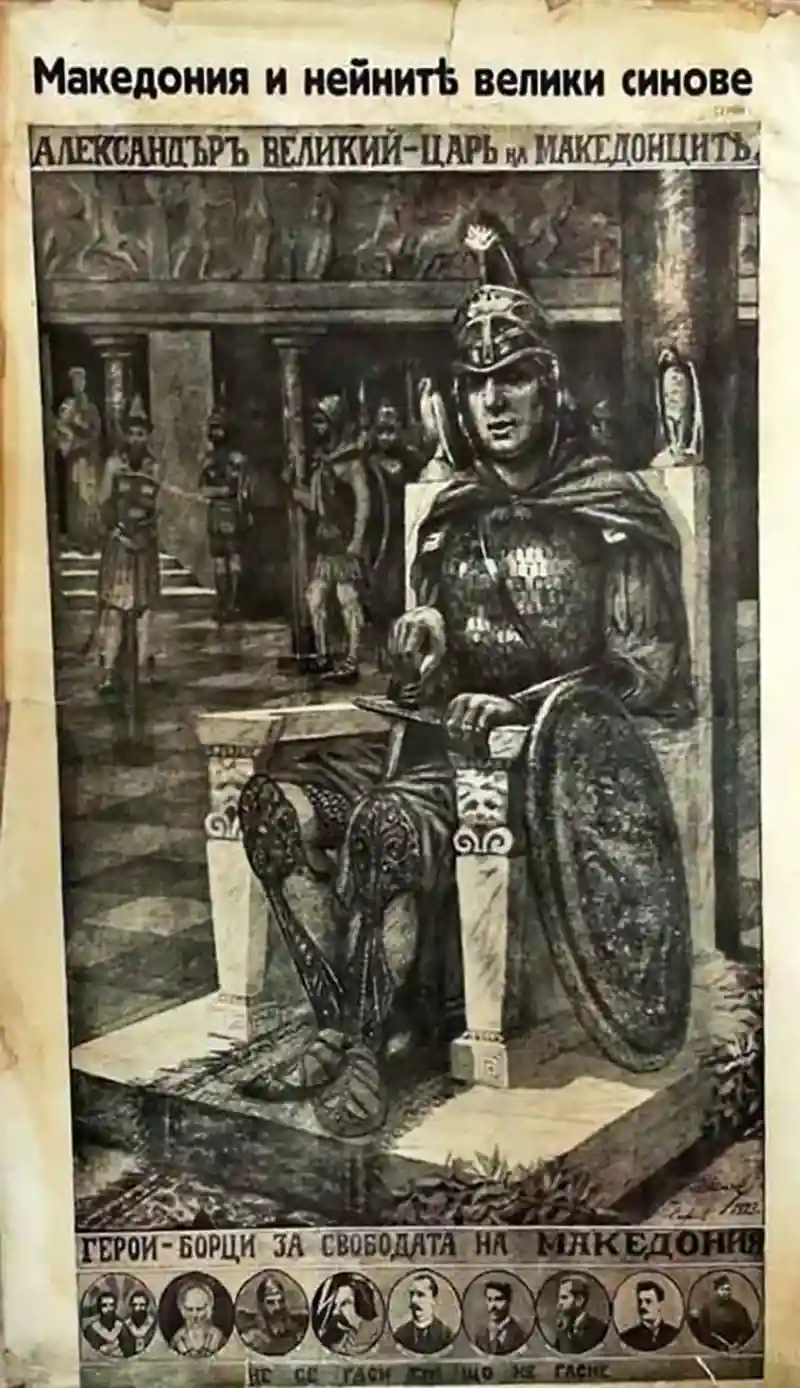
Sheet from a Calendar with Alexander the Great issued by the Ilinden Organization in 1923.

In an article from 1871, published in the newspaper "Macedonia" by Petko Slaveykov, he maintained that he had heard during the 1860s that some young Slavic intellectuals from Macedonia were claiming that they are not Bulgarians, but rather Macedonians, descendants of the Ancient Macedonians. However, they never provided any proof supporting their views. The newspaper had the title "Macedonia", as its main task per Slaveykov himself, was to educate these misguided (sic): Grecomans there, whom he called Macedonists. In 1875 Georgi Pulevski published a "Dictionary of three languages" where he mentions that the homeland of the Macedonian nation is Macedonia and that that land is most famous for the rule of the great king Alexander. These opinions were based on the incorrect claims that the Ancient Macedonians were in fact Early Slavs. In 1934 the communist activist Vasil Ivanovski in his article: "Why we Macedonians are a separate nation" criticizes the Greek chauvinists for claiming: "... the tribe of the ancient Macedonians, as well as the leaders of that tribe – Macedon, Philip of Macedon and Alexander the Great – as an integral part of the ancient Greeks."

=== Ancient Macedonian narratives ===
Important for endorsing such beliefs were anti-Bulgarian attempts by secular and religious Greek institutions. One of these Greek approaches was the spread of the myth of the origin from Alexander the Great and Ancient Macedonians. Greek priests and academics tried to convince the local Orthodox Slavic-speaking population that they were Macedonians, directly related to Alexander the Great, and, as a result, Greeks. The aim was to persuade these people to turn away from Slavic exertion of influence and to accept the authority of the government in Athens. In the last quarter of the nineteenth century in the geographic region called Macedonia, which constituted the last part of the Ottoman Empire on the Balkan Peninsula that still had not gained independence, a serious struggle emerged about the national affiliation of the Christian Slavs. However, the claims of the already independent states Bulgaria, Greece and Serbia overlapped considerably, since they all could refer to Macedonia having been part of their correspondent empire during the Middle Ages.

Wherever one might locate the origin of Ancient Macedonian nationhood among parts of the Orthodox Slavic speaking population: national myths inspired by antiquity did not play an important role in any of the events that Macedonian historiography regards as a milestone of present-day Macedonian state- and nationhood – above all the Ilinden Uprising and the Kruševo Republic in 1903. Furthermore, "there have neither been any references towards Alexander the Great or Ancient Macedonia in the iconography and the popular mythology of the interwar platforms for the Macedonian national liberation. As well, they have been absent in the partisan movement during the Second World War and were not referred to in the proclamation of the Macedonian statehood in 1944."

A narrative that comes close to the notion of Ancient Macedonian nationhood during the coming into being of a modern Macedonian state, was the idea of a United Macedonia, which was based on the estimated territory of the Ancient Kingdom of Macedon under the rule of Philip II. Early national poets used those borders in order to define a corresponding nation in their writings. The ASNOM manifesto (English: Anti-fascist Assembly for the National Liberation of Macedonia; Macedonian: Antifašističko Sobranie za Narodno Osloboduvanje na Makedonija) took reference to the "shameful partition" of Macedonia in the course of the Balkan Wars and it contained the appeal to the "Macedonians under Bulgaria and Greece" to take part in the anti-fascist fight and the struggle for Macedonian unification.

In Yugoslav times, several narratives of origin existed and the myth of Ancient Macedonian origin was incorporated in the nation building process. Nevertheless, according to Vangeli (and contrasting Troebst's view), this narrative was subordinated to the narrative of Yugoslav (i.e. South Slav) origin, which played a central role in Tito's Yugoslavian nation-building process. However, references to antiquity, for instance by means of official history books, were institutionalized already in Yugoslavian times. As Vangeli analyzes, the notion of Macedonian ancient history "[still] was taken with a reserve, and was mostly instrumentalized in the disputes with Bulgarian historiography and also as a protection from the nationalist discourse among certain Macedonians that was based on the idea of 'returning the Bulgarian consciousness' of Macedonians."

Although official institutions used the recollection of antiquity in moderate ways, Ancient Macedonian narratives were crucial for the nationalism of parts of the Macedonian diaspora. Agnew states, that "the 1980s had seen the emergence in Yugoslav Macedonia and in the Macedonian Diaspora (particularly in Australia and Canada) of a Macedonism or Macedonian nationalism that drew exactly opposite conclusions about the ethnicity of ancient Macedonia and Alexander the Great than did Greek nationalism." There has been evidence, that organization established by members of the Macedonian Diaspora in Australia, Canada and the United States used ancient Macedonian symbols for representation purposes already before 1980. Further it has been argued, that ethnic Macedonian refugees who fled from Greek Macedonia in the times of the Greek Civil War, were crucial for this initial development of antiquization, as the narrative of ancient descent has been regarded as credible among Greeks and ethnic Macedonians or Slavs in Greece. Some members of the Macedonian diaspora even believe, without basis, that certain modern historians, namely Ernst Badian, Peter Green, and Eugene Borza, possess a pro-Macedonian bias in the Macedonian-Greek conflict.

=== Post-independence ===
When the Republic of Macedonia declared its independence in 1991 and hence re-opened the national question, it faced criticism and denial from various sides and in various ways, which might have served as a source of inspiration for nationalistic discourses and later antiquization. Already shortly after the independence in 1992, official institutions gradually highlighted the ancient past more and more. The post-independence version of the official "History of the Macedonian People" dealt with the topic of the Ancient Macedonian Kingdom on 200 pages. In comparison, the edition from the year 1969 needed only 20 pages to treat the same topic.

At the same time, the flag of North Macedonia, the first public display of what later has been called antiquization, caused serious tensions with its neighboring country Greece. The new flag of the Republic of Macedonia depicted the Star of Vergina. This symbol, appearing in ancient Greek art of the period between the 6th and 2nd centuries BC and also depicted in the golden Larnax of Philip II, discovered in the 1970s, is regarded by some as the symbol of the Argead dynasty, the ancient royal family of the kingdom of Macedon. It is claimed by Greece to be an integral part of its cultural and historical heritage. This flag dispute went along with the infamous name dispute, since Greece also would not accept the name "Republic of Macedonia" for its neighboring country, as it feared usurpation of history as well as territorial claims from the Slavic-Macedonian side. Due to political pressure by the Greek government, which eventually led to the signing of an Interim Accord in 1995, Macedonia temporally adopted the reference "The former Yugoslav Republic of Macedonia" for international use, removed the Star of Vergina from its flag and erased all allegedly irredentist clauses from its constitution. The Republic of Macedonia also had to refrain from using symbols that constitute a part of Greece's historic or cultural patrimony.

In the aftermath of this agreement most narratives of Ancient Macedonian descent were suspended by official institutions. Yet, the myths of Ancient Macedonian origin never totally disappeared in all political and academic circles. Similarly, the ancient past remained a substantial part of Macedonian national history in history textbooks.

The name dispute with Greece, which has been resolved in the Prespa agreement, renaming the country from Macedonia to North Macedonia, is not only a matter of political conflict, but through the construction of history and claims for heritage, this matter is advanced by scientific advocates for national causes on both sides.

=== NATO and European Union accession ===
In April 2008, Greece blocked the accession of Macedonia to NATO with a veto at the Bucharest summit. Subsequently, in 2009, the Greek government prevented the Republic of Macedonia from getting a date on part of the European Union for starting accession talks. The Accession of North Macedonia to the European Union is still pending. It has been argued, that since then, antiquization has "snowballed into a wider phenomenon." As Macedonia's president Gjorge Ivanov announced, "the Classical drive" has its roots in "the frustration and depression felt after the NATO Summit in Bucharest."

The fact of being excluded from these organizations despite the investments and reforms that had been undertaken, ultimately revitalized the uncertainty concerning the country's economic and security perspectives. This has strengthened the "defeatist attitude", that, irrespective of the efforts of the Macedonian government, Greece and other opponents would always find a possibility to block Macedonia's progress. "The main engine driving nation-state building has not been Albanian-Macedonian relations, but rather the tensions with Greece over Macedonia’s name, particularly acute since the Greek veto to Macedonia's NATO membership in 2008. The widely pursued antiquization campaign, including the megalomanic project Skopje 2014, have emphasized promoting one ethnic defined identity."

On the other hand, it has been argued, that Greece showed vigorous reactions to the initial antiquization policies, such as the renaming of Skopje's airport in 2007, which subsequently altered Greece's attitude towards the Republic of Macedonia. In the end, the name issue and next to it the symbolic dispute about the ancient Macedonian heritage became the last obstacle on Macedonia's unsuccessful way to negotiations for full EU membership.

=== VMRO–DPMNE's arrival to power ===
In the Macedonian parliamentary election, 2006, VMRO-DPMNE became the largest power in the Assembly of the Republic of Macedonia. Since the Macedonian parliamentary election, 2008, the ruling party, led by Prime Minister Nikola Gruevski, formed a coalition with the largest Albanian party, DUI (Democratic Union for Integration). It is this period after the arrival to power of the VMRO-DPMNE that is inseparably linked to antiquization, since it is the time when the myths of ancient nationhood gained new importance due to VMRO-DPMNE's devotion to nationalist and identitarian politics. It is the time when antiquization gained its full potential for political mobilization, when the "name of Alexander the Great was used to simply depict the nation's grandeur and to nourish the people's spirit" and when the VMRO-DPMNE "aimed to gain the loyalty of Macedonian nationalists once again" through the celebration of national mythology.

== Perceptions ==
=== Government (VMRO-DPMNE) position ===
The perceptions of the identitarian and historical politics of VMRO-DPMNE in North Macedonia and across the globe differ strongly. VMRO-DPMNE presents its policies and their visual manifestation as the representation of the true Macedonian history. According to this viewpoint, it is not inventing but representing history as it was and rewriting a hidden history. The antiquization politics and Skopje 2014 are often represented as being conducted and facilitated by the government. This is applicable to the VMRO-DPMNE, the leading party of the government, which seeks to represent issues of the ethnic Macedonian majority of the country, but as Ulf Brunnbauer points out, the coalition partner DUI, rejects these policies.

Proponents of the government's politics of the recollection of ancient Macedonian origin and its display in Skopje 2014 argue that "it neatly offers a linear chronological overview of all things Macedonian." In this view, Skopje 2014 is seen as an opportunity for history to neutrally speak for itself, as if the understanding and presentation of history would not be ideologically and politically disputed but rather obvious and objective. Accordingly, this (re)presentation of history is thus not influenced by VMRO-DPMNE's ideological beliefs.

The term "antiquization", which reveals a willing recollection and re-interpretation of an alleged ancient past, is thus dismissed by government proponents as an "invented neologism in a broad anti-Macedonian conspiracy" that tries to undermine Macedonia's true historical grandeur.

==== Ethno-nationalistic discourse ====
Among critics, antiquization is seen as an ethno-nationalistic discourse that is built around the outstanding figure of Alexander the Great. This power-ridden hegemonic discourse is mainly imposed by the political elite and the VMRO-DPMNE and is based upon a process of rereading history. Such a process of the highly selective nationalist reading of history, the selective remembering and un-remembering of specific matters is regarded as essential for nationalist political mobilization. It has been criticized as pseudohistoric as well.

==== Myths of continuity and autochthony ====
Linked to this nationalistic discourse is the construction of a national Macedonian identity. According to Brunnbauer, the Macedonian state just starts to get engaged with a project which its neighboring countries performed already in the course of the 19th century: to design a historical myth, which is based upon the ideas of historical continuity and autochthonous origin. The aim is to "prove" or to convince Macedonians to believe in the continuity of 'the' Macedonian history and the direct descent of the modern ethnic Macedonians from the Ancient Macedonians. The endeavor is nothing less than drawing an uninterrupted line from the ancient Kingdom of Macedon to the present, in order to emphasize the great achievements of the Macedonian nation, its heritage and its peculiarity.

From a nationalist Macedonian perspective, the self-portrayal as descendants of the Ancient Macedonians has the advantage of presenting the Macedonians as an autochthonous people. In this way, a claim on Macedonian territory can be substantiated. In the words of Margaret MacMillan "History provides much of the fuel for nationalism. It creates the collective memories that help to bring the nation into being. The shared celebration of the nation's great achievements – and the shared sorrow at its defeat – sustain and foster it. The further back the history appears to go, the more solid and enduring the nation seems – and the worthier its claims." These claims not only contain territory. The principle of autochthonism also comprises the historical right of a nation to control certain symbols – "the older the nation is imagined, the more powerful it is, thus the more right it has to manifest its dominion."

In the Macedonian case, the government attempts to legitimize its right to the name and the remaining symbolical capital of Macedonia by means of the supposed straight link with the Ancient Kingdom. The myth of autochthony also supplies the need to distinguish ethnic Macedonians from their neighbors and ethnically differing compatriots, as it suggests that the ancestors of the Macedonians lived in this area before it was populated by the ancestors of the neighboring peoples. Balibar refers to the myth of origins and national continuity as "an effective ideological form, in which the imaginary singularity of national formation is constructed daily, by moving back from present into history." However, unpleasing for the Macedonians is the fact that substantial components of their myth already constitute fundamental elements of the interpretation of national history from their neighboring countries. As a consequence they experience aggressive repudiation for their claims.

Another point of critique against the antiquization narrative and Skopje 2014 aims at the alleged neatly "linear chronological overview of all things Macedonian". Maja Muhić and Aleksandar Takovski regard this claim as ironic, since they almost cannot find any correlation between the represented figures that are used to demonstrate the continuity of Macedonian national identity.

A challenge for the continuity narrative and a reason for the conflicting national historical claims of the different states in the Balkans is the dynamic and changeful past of this region. A part of what is nowadays called the geographical region of Macedonia, belonged to the Ancient Kingdom of Macedon. Thereafter, at various times, the term 'Macedonia' covered different administrative districts of the Roman Empire, the Byzantine Empire, and the Ottoman Empire. None of these districts was permanent or stable. Already in Byzantine times, Byzantine writers used the terms "Macedonia" and "Macedonians" in different, sometimes unclear and misleading ways. "The generally accepted knowledge in today's historiography holds that for Late Antiquity, as well as for later in Byzantium, the term Macedonia/ Macedonians has a regional/provincial/geographical meaning, and certainly not an ethnic one."

==== Reasons and motivation for 'antiquization' ====
Several scholars see VMRO-DPMNE's promotion of so-called antiquization as a reaction to the stagnation of Macedonia's foreign affairs due to Greek opposition to Macedonia's efforts for EU and NATO-membership. According to this view, Gruevski's government thus prioritized its consolidation of power on the national level as well as it aims at fostering Macedonia's nation building process. Christopher Flood describes these kinds of processes in a more general manner. Therefore, political myths and grand narratives, as for example ancient Macedonian nationhood, come up as a consequence of a situation in which a society experienced some kind of trauma. Others point out that the glory of a national hero like Alexander the Great helps to overcome what has been called the 'moral crisis of post-communism': the situation of a country that still has to handle the burden of a complex and tiresome post-communist transition, smoldering ethnicized tensions, a weak economy and low living standards. Vangeli, therefore, summarizes that "antiquity-inspired Macedonian nationalist rhetoric has emerged as a 'compensation for backwardness' (Hanák) (Note: See: Hanák Péter: "A National Compensation for Backwardness", Studies in East European Thought, 46. 1–2 (1994): 33–45.) brought by the unsuccessful regime change and the incomplete consolidation of the new regime." However, as outlined above, Greece's opposition is also motivated by Macedonia's recollection of its alleged ancient history and descent.

Still, antiquization seems to effectively address the negative sentiments of some Macedonians and their feeling of being rejected. The notion of being descendants of a glorious and famous empire comforts some Macedonians and is used to strengthen national pride. The government's rhetoric of the glorious Macedonian past offers distinction from their neighbors, a legitimation for the national struggle and thus serves as an inspiration for political movements. At the same time the image of the celebrated past is contrasted to the image of a problematic and questionable present and in the end it is used for the mobilization of the masses.

Macedonian antiquization can be described as an act of communication that aims at two directions; inward as well as outward. One aims at the inner nation building process, the other at the representation of North Macedonia in the international sphere. By using names like Alexander the Great for its airports and highways, the Republic of Macedonia tried to mobilize the potential of antiquity and to gain the impact of globally known and recognized names. Further, the image of antiquity is used for tourism advertisements on international television. Government-funded campaigns promote North Macedonia as the 'Cradle of Culture' or bear the title 'Macedonia Timeless' while presenting Macedonian archaeology and ancient heritage. In the same way, the monuments and buildings that constitute a part of Skopje 2014 are believed to help to improve Macedonia's image for international visitors and to attract tourists on a long-term basis.

==== Skopje 2014 ====
The urban planning project Skopje 2014 plays a visible role in Macedonia's identitarian politics and virtually can be seen as an illustration of the whole process of antiquization. Hence, this 'mass-production of tradition' and its 'statuomania' also is a central object of critique.

Critics regard Skopje 2014 as a nationalistic construction site, where nation-building gets a new meaning. Here the government literally builds a national identity. The VMRO-DPMNE-led government has been accused of constantly prioritizing cultural policies over objective problems: in the course of the 2008 financial crisis, the Macedonian government spent vast amounts of its state budget on the erection of statues, the construction of monumental buildings and archaeological excavations encouraged by the myths of ancient Macedonian descent instead of focusing on real problems. In this manner identity questions could also serve as a distraction.

==== Neglecting Ottoman and Yugoslav times ====
At first sight it seems ironic that social scientists assert that the identitarian policies of VMRO-DPMNE and its manifestation in Skopje 2014 present disrupted narratives, since the way the past is remembered simply ignores and in its consequence deletes important parts of the history of the region. Critics point out that the remembrance of the Ottoman times is neglected, although over five hundred years of Ottoman rule and culture left its traces in the whole region. They even speak about a "de-Ottomanization" process obliterating Ottoman heritage and moving away from Islam. Also the Yugoslavian times, which had significant impact on the young Macedonian state as well, are cut out of the alleged historical continuity. For VMRO-DPMNE both periods constitute an anathema: the Ottoman rule – the so-called Turkish yoke – is regarded as the dark 500 years. The affiliation to the Socialist Federal Republic of Yugoslavia is seen as the time of suppressing Macedonia's striving for autonomy. The intended cutting off of the socialist legacy again seems ironic, since it was under the guidance and as part of the SFRY that the Republic of Macedonia was constituted for the first time in the year 1944.

In Muhić and Takovskis’ view, Skopje 2014 "aims at creating a Macedonian, Orthodox Christian national identity amidst competing neighbouring agendas and the multicultural setting of the country. It does so by tearing apart, fragmenting and creating discontinuous segments of the organic tissue of the history of this region and country for the benefit of a few and the loss of the vast majority of Macedonian citizens." Also other authors describe Skopje 2014 as a project aimed at redefining Skopje's urban character within a short time. New buildings disguise and hide the modernist constructions of the Yugoslav period as well as the Ottoman architecture of the Čaršija (the Old Bazaar), which have been the two most distinctive characteristics of the city. "Instead, the project promises Skopje a new image, one that will deliver Macedonia a properly "European" capital, at once attractive to outsiders and worthy of national pride."

==== Inter-ethnic tensions ====
Further, critics claim, that the identitarian politics, by writing a mono-ethnic and mono-cultural history, not only leave out certain parts of the country's history, but that the multicultural reality of the Republic of Macedonian is being ignored. Disregarding the Ottoman and Muslim heritage, emphasizing the Christian cultural imprint, focusing only on matters regarding the origin of ethnic Macedonians and ignoring the multicultural Macedonian reality, pushes the Albanian population and other minority groups such as Turks, Vlachs, Serbs and Roma to the side and signals that they are not an integral part of Macedonian history and, hence, Macedonia. Some critics describe that the multicultural approach that was elaborated in the Ohrid Framework Agreement (OFA) in 2001 and improved the conditions of the Albanian population, is now rejected due to antiquization and Skopje 2014. It has also been stated that this mono-ethnic display and interpretation of history symbolically degrades ethnic Albanians to the status they had before the 2001 agreement. This is to say that antiquization and Skopje 2014 erode the basis of the post-OFA Macedonian society, i.e. the inclusive model of representation and the recognition of cultural diversity. Leading to a re-ethnicization of multiple levels of society. Even Sam Vaknin, a former advisor to Prime Minister Gruevski, delineated antiquization as an anti-Albanian nation-building project, rather than being anti-Greek or anti-Bulgarian. Also other authors regard Skopje 2014 as a message in the permanent tensions between the Macedonian majority and the Albanian minority. They coincide in their view upon Skopje 2014 having an ethnic-Macedonian connotation, ignoring the ethnic plurality of the city. In Brunnbauer's view, this also serves to demonstrate the Macedonian claim to ownership of "their" capital, which they see threatened by the Albanians.

Albanians from the local intelligentsia and political class have publicly expressed concerns over antiquization with politician Abdurahman Aliti stating it sent "a message to Albanians that they are newcomers in this country and have nothing to do here." Journalist Sefer Tahiri said that antiquization aimed at returning the country to a "pre-2001 period ... to a mono-ethnic state consisting of Macedonians only". DUI were mainly quiet about antiquization with little dissent in its ranks as expressed by Musa Xhaferi who said "if you ask the Albanian public, it thinks that this project is a provocation, although perhaps it is not the project's goal." To shift attention from Albanians being absent from the Skopje 2014 project, the Macedonian government agreed to fund Skanderbeg Square built around the existing Skanderbeg monument in the part of Skopje with a majority Albanian population.

The Muslim Macedonian speaking (Torbeš) population does not identify with the actions of the VRMO-DPMNE government and its politics of Antiquization that aimed to present a Macedonian history dating to an ancient past. Likewise the Macedonian Muslim community also does not associate itself with the figure of Alexander the Great. Antiquization and Skopje 2014 are widely perceived as causing deterioration in inter-ethnic relations. Minority groups in Macedonia oppose the one-sided ethnocentric approach of antiquization and leading Albanians have warned about the growing frustration among non-Macedonians. Furthermore, Skopje 2014 is largely regarded as blocking Macedonia's European integration process, which some observers consider as one main strategic goal of Albanian politics in Macedonia.

==== Intra-Macedonian tensions ====
It has been argued, that the antiquization process illustrates a situation of power imbalance and power abuse within Macedonian internal politics. It has been described that the government-led discourse attempted to silence opposing voices and by doing so risking the elimination of public space and the emergence of insuperable ideological, political and social gaps in an already unstable social and political realities. These societal fissures do not only run along ethnic lines but even disunite ethnic Macedonians for various reasons, as for instance believing in Slavic or Ancient descent or supporting VMRO-DPMNE or SDSM.

== Consequences of 'antiquization' from a critical perspective ==
The processes in North Macedonia that have been called antiquization, show, which significance the ones in power give to history as a resource for political legitimacy and mobilization. Externally, the enterprise of revising North Macedonia's official history and work on the national self-image of ethnic Macedonians has negatively influenced the dynamics of the name dispute with Greece and, hence, deteriorated the international position of the country. Simultaneously, it has fostered inter-ethnic tensions and posed serious challenges for the weak multicultural society. However, with regard to home affairs, antiquization seems to have fulfilled its purpose. VMRO-DPMNE wins elections on a regular basis, which, according to Brunnbauer do not entirely meet European standards of fairness, but still represent a realistic picture of the political preferences in the country. To the strong criticism of antiquization, the Macedonian government and its proponents replied by defending their indentitarian policies and by further fortifying antiquization. Yet, critics warn about increasing ethnic and other social fissures and a growing fragmentation of the relatively unstable society. Again others consider a continuing blockade of Macedonia's European integration as the country's main threat, as they regard the European integration as the only option for keeping the Macedonian state together and avoiding its disintegration.

Surveys from the Institute of Social Sciences and Humanities Skopje (ISSHS) on the effects of Skopje 2014 on the perceptions of the population of Skopje revealed a high degree of uncertainty regarding their national identity. In a poll asking people to choose the historical period that defines the Macedonian national identity, the breakdown of responses was as follows: Independence (from 1991) 13%; enlightenment period (19th century) 26%; the revolutionary period (beginning of the 20th century) 31%; SFRY 30%. Following the results of a supplementary national poll, carried out by ISSHS in September 2013, only 5.8% of the general population viewed antiquity as a historically and culturally defining period for Macedonia, whereas among ethnic Macedonians the result was 7.6%. "These results show that there is a great discrepancy between the population's sentiment and the narrative the Government seeks to promote."

== See also ==
- Dacianism
