= Vergina Sun =

Rayed solar symbol

The Vergina Sun, as depicted on the top of the Golden Larnax of Philip II of Macedon.

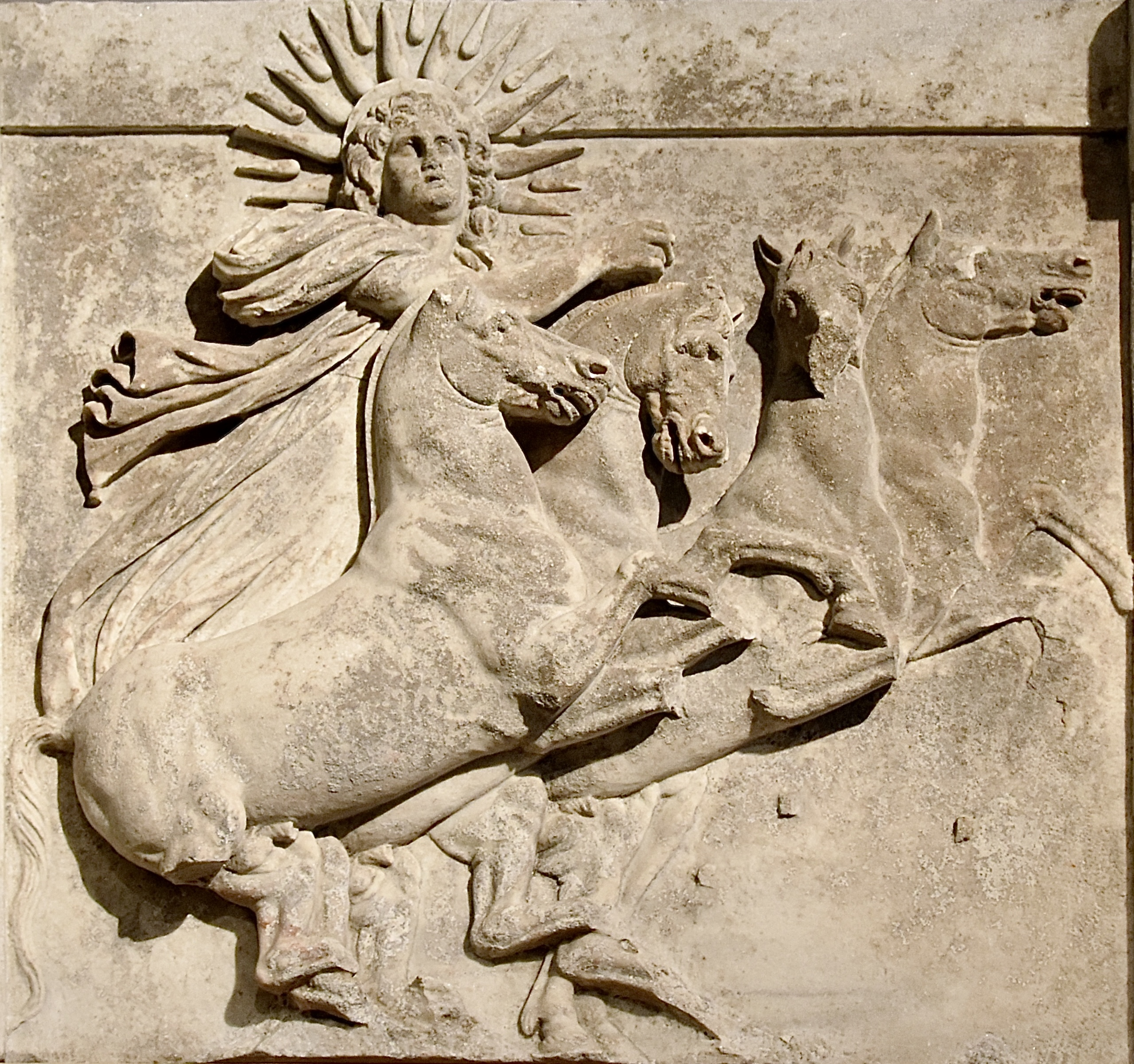
A relief sculpture depicting Helios with a rayed halo (Athena's temple, Ilion, early 4th century BC)

The Vergina Sun (Greek: Ήλιος της Βεργίνας, romanized: Ilios tis Vergínas, lit. 'Sun of Vergina'), also known as the Star of Vergina, Vergina Star or Argead Star, is a rayed solar symbol first appearing in ancient Greek art and architecture in the 5th century BC. The Vergina Sun proper has sixteen triangular rays, while comparable symbols of the same period variously have sixteen, twelve, eight or (rarely) six rays.

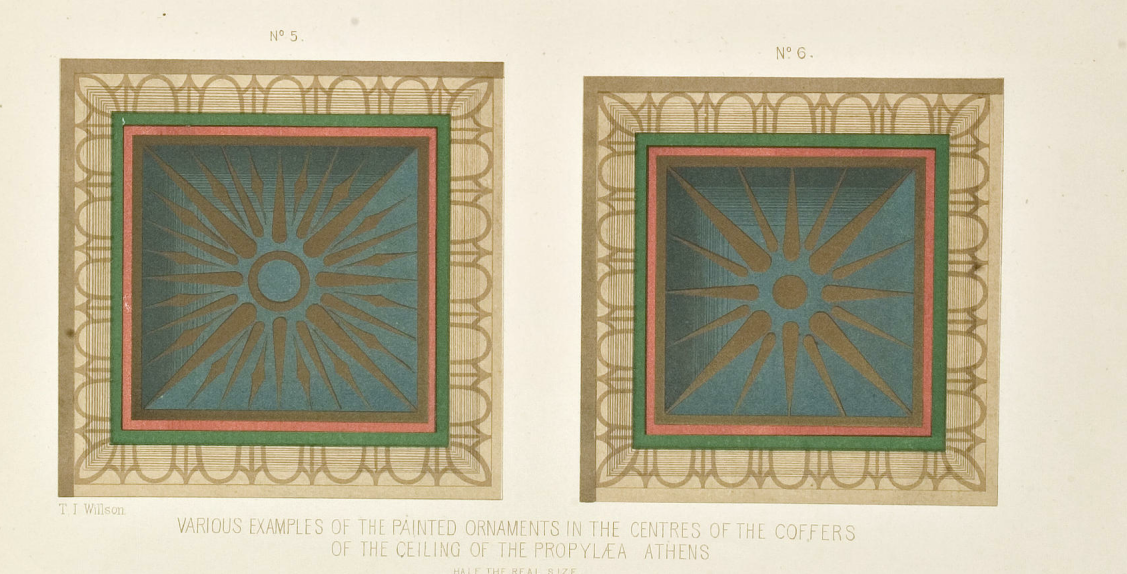
The star motif in the Athens Propylaea by Penrose (1888)

Even though the star appears in several ancient Greek temples, the name "Vergina Sun" became widely used after the archaeological excavations at the site of Aigai, in and around the small town of Vergina, in Central Macedonia, Greece, during the late 1970s. In older references, the name "Argead Star" or "Star of the Argeadai" is used for the Sun as the possible royal symbol of the Argead dynasty of the ancient kingdom of Macedonia. There it was depicted on a golden larnax found in a 4th-century BC royal tomb belonging to either Philip II or Philip III of Macedon, the father and half-brother of Alexander the Great, respectively.

Tentatively interpreted as the historical royal symbol of ancient Macedonia, rather than just a generic decorative element in ancient Greek art, the Vergina Sun came into popular use among Macedonian Greeks since the 1980s, and became commonly used as an official emblem in the Greek region of Macedonia, and by other Greek state entities during the 1990s.

The Vergina Sun symbol was the subject in a controversy in the first half of 1990s between Greece and the newly independent Republic of Macedonia (now North Macedonia), which adopted it as a symbol of Macedonian nationalism and depicted it on its national flag. Eventually, in 1995 and as a result of this dispute, the young republic's flag was revised into a different rayed solar symbol. On 17 June 2018, the two countries signed the Prespa Agreement, which stipulates the removal of the Vergina Sun from public use in North Macedonia. Eventually, in early July 2019 the government of North Macedonia announced the complete removal of the symbol from all public areas, institutions and monuments in the country, except archeological sites.

== Antiquity ==
The star motif appears in the architectural decoration of several ancient Greek temples, where it was used as an ornament in coffered ceilings. The ceiling of the Theseum (Temple of Hephaestus) in Athens provided an early published example: the motif was reproduced in outline in the third volume of The Antiquities of Athens (1794), whose accompanying text described it as being “painted on the soffit of the lacunaria”. Coloured designs and traces of paint recorded on the coffers of the Temple of Nemesis at Rhamnous were subsequently published by the Society of Dilettanti in The Unedited Antiquities of Attica (1817). In 1842, the Transactions of the Royal Institute of British Architects reproduced the Hephaisteion star pattern in a report on Greek architectural polychromy, alongside investigations of pigments from the Hephaisteion and the Propylaea of the Athenian Acropolis. Later nineteenth-century studies of the Athenian Propylaea, including those by Francis Cranmer Penrose and Richard Bohn, further documented the decoration of its coffered ceilings. Franz Sales Meyer, in A Handbook of Ornament (New York: Architectural Book Publishing Co., 1896), referred to this star motif as the “Uraniscus”. The motif also featured in the polychrome decoration of the entrance hall of the British Museum, completed in 1847 to a design "derived from ancient Greek sources", by Robert Smirke and decorated by Sidney Smirke and Leonard Collmann.

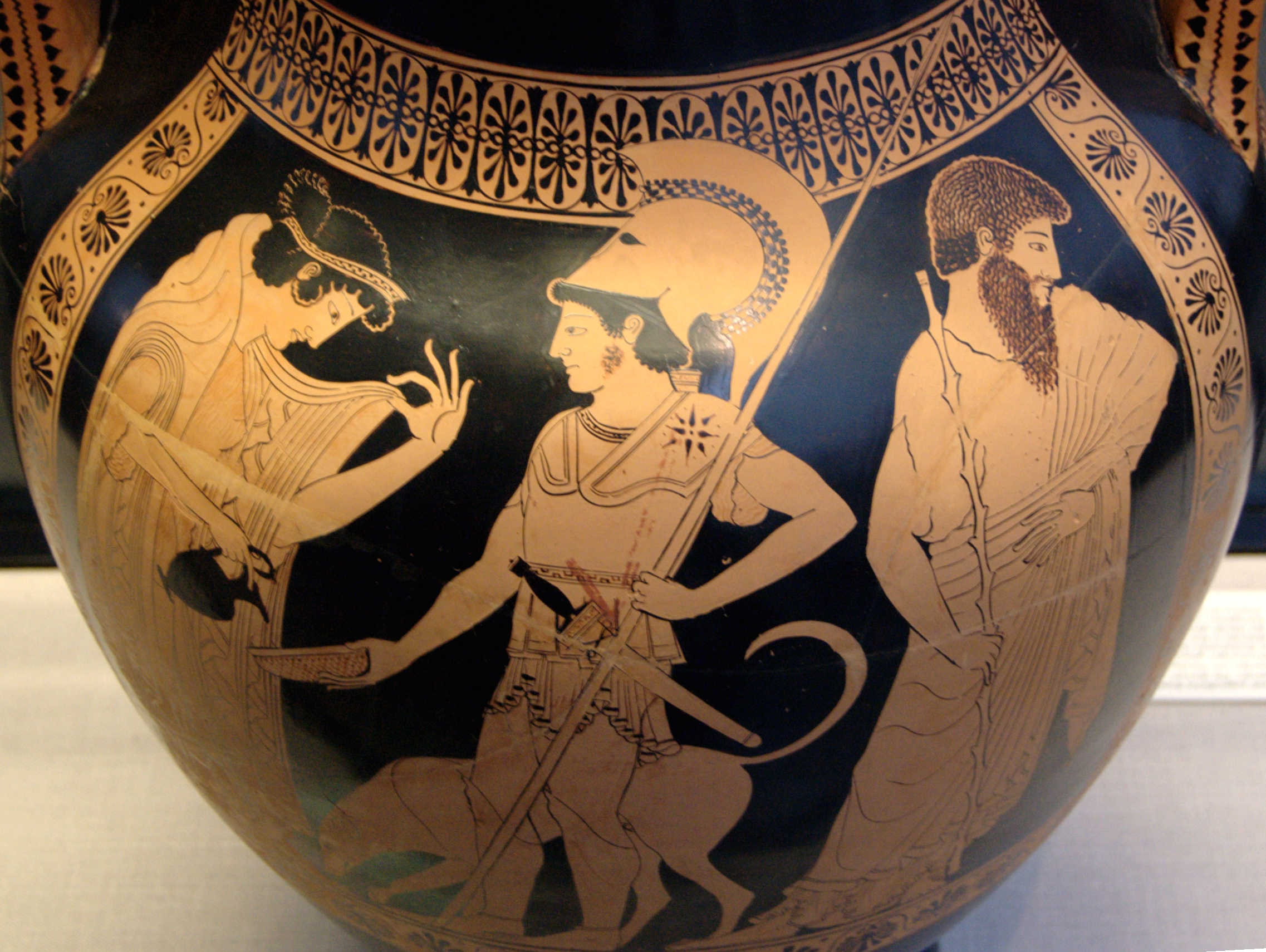
A hoplite with an eight-pointed sun on his left shoulder. Side A of an Ancient Greek Attic red-figure belly-amphora, 500–490 BC, from Vulci, Italy. Staatliche Antikensammlungen, Munich, Germany.

Other early representations of similar motifs date to at least the 6th century BC, with hoplites depicted as bearing sixteen-pointed and eight-pointed sunburst symbols on their shields and armor, and the same symbols being represented on coins from both island and mainland Greece from at least the 5th century BC. The Iliad describes the first panoply of Achilles as having star motifs.

During his excavations at Vergina, the site of the ancient Macedonian capital of Aegae, the archaeologist Manolis Andronikos found the symbol on the coffin (Golden Larnax) believed to belong to Philip II of Macedon, father of Alexander the Great. The "sunburst" symbol was already well known as a symbol used both by the Macedonian royal dynasty (e.g. on coins), as well as being present in the Hellenistic civilization more generally. The symbol might represent the Sun god (Helios), whose role as a patron deity of the Argead dynasty might be implied by a story about Perdiccas I of Macedon narrated by Herodotus (8.137). In the early 1980s, following the discovery of the larnax, there was some debate as to whether the symbol should be considered the "royal emblem" of the Argeads specifically. Αs Eugene Borza (1982) pointed out, the symbol was widely used in Hellenistic-era art, and Adams (1983) emphasized its use as a decorative element in ancient Greek art in general and that it cannot be said to represent either a "royal" or "national" emblem of Macedon exclusively.

=== Gallery ===
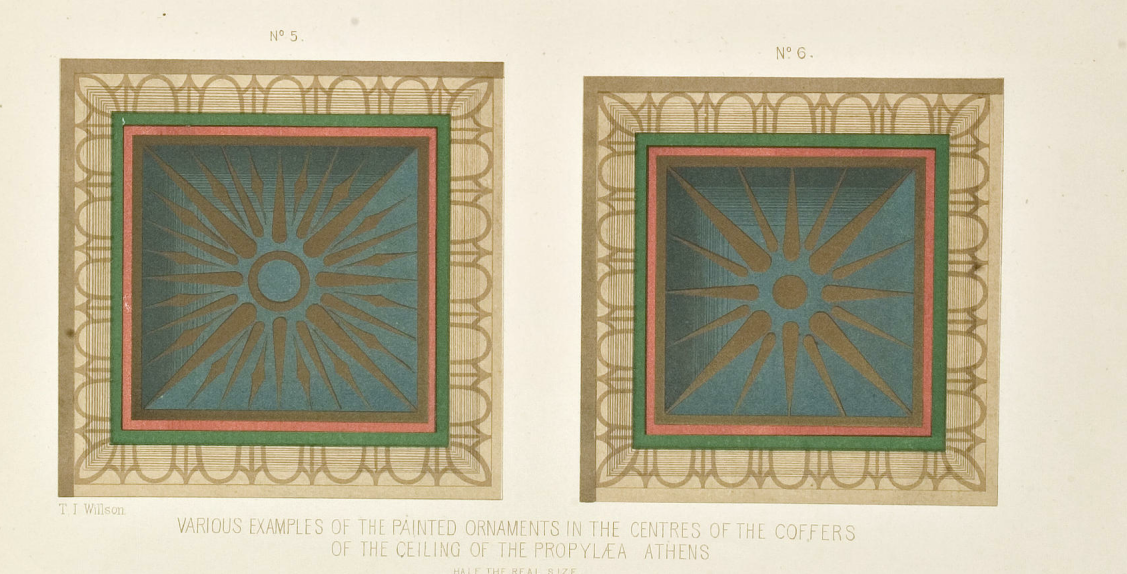
The star (right) ornamenting the coffers of the Propylaea of the Athens Acropolis, mid 5th century BC, source: Penrose, Francis Cranmer. An Investigation of the Principles of Athenian Architecture (1851; revised editions, including 1888)

The same pattern from the Athens Propylaea, as surveyed by Richard Bohn (1882) and published in Die Propyläen der Akropolis zu Athen (Berlin, 1882). Architectural survey and documentation of the Athenian Propylaea. Plate XII p. 60, mid 5th century BC

The star ornamented the ceiling coffers of the Temple of Hephaestus in Athens (Theseum.) Published in Royal Institute of British Architects. Transactions, vol. I, part 2 (1842), plate 10 and pp. 369–375. Report on Greek polychromy and the Hephaisteion star motif. Second half of the 5th century BC

The star ornamented the ceiling coffers of the Temple of Nemesis in Rhamnous, published by Society of Dilettanti. The Unedited Antiquities of Attica (1817), chapter 6, plate 6. Coloured coffer decoration at Rhamnous and Eleusis. Late 5th century BC

The star ornamented the ceiling coffers of a temple, published by Jacques Ignace Hittorff, L’Architecture Polychrome chez les Grecs (1851)

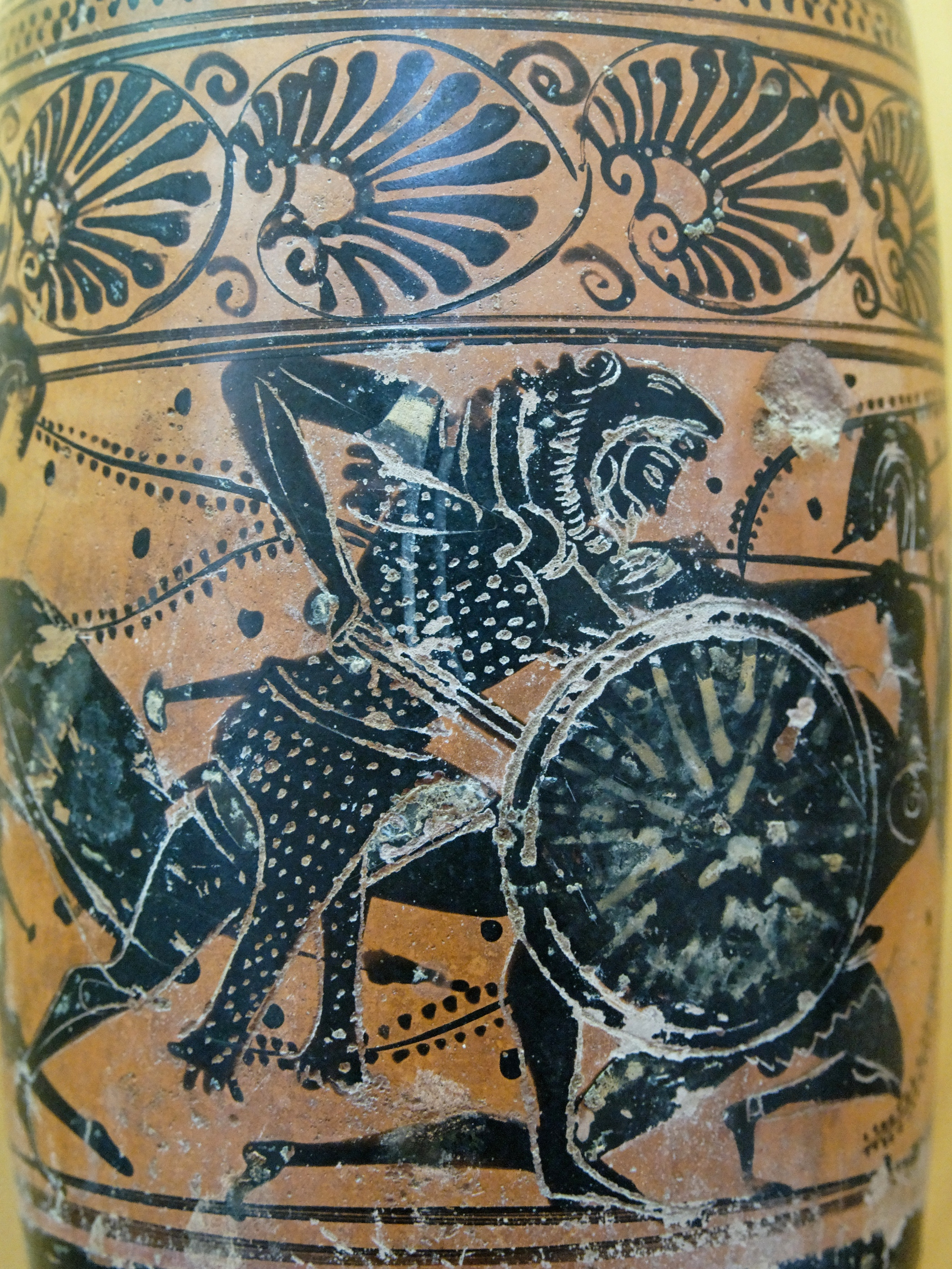
Heracles fighting the Amazons. Attic black-figure lekythos, early 5th century BC, from Gela. An amazon bearing a Vergina sun symbol on her shield. Regional Archaeological Museum "Antonio Salinas", Palermo.

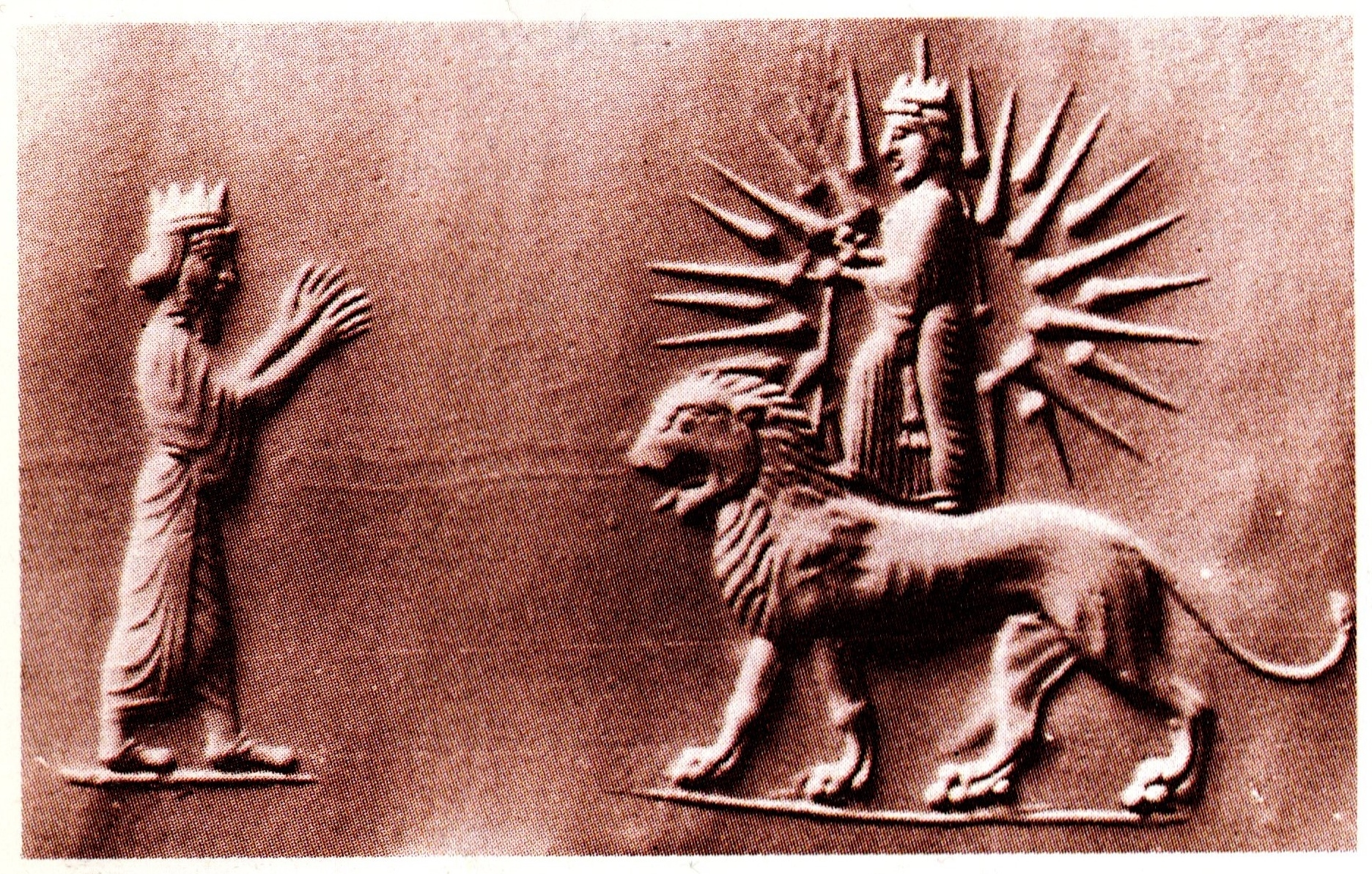
Achaemenid seal, depicting Great King Artaxerxes II together with a radiant sun around the goddess Anahita in a lion and sun motif

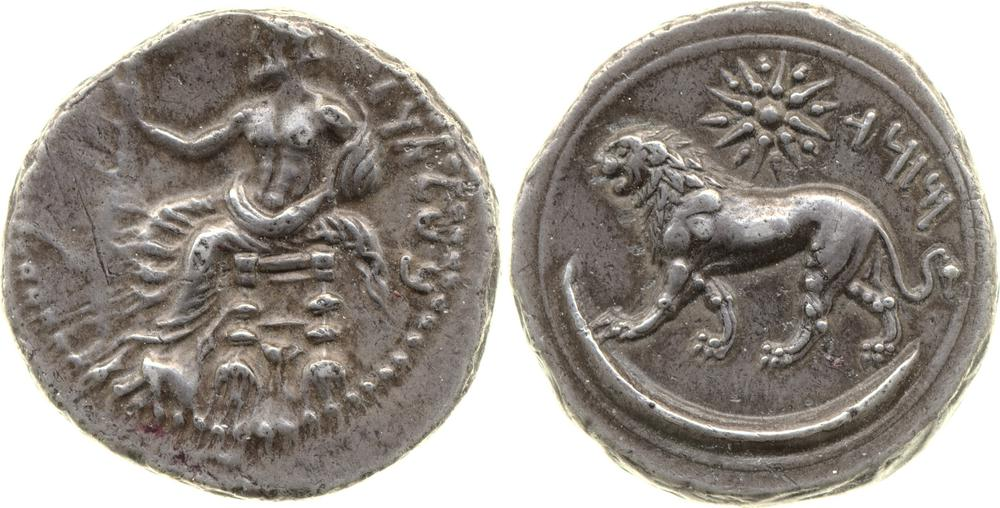
Silver coin of Mazaeus, Persian satrap of Cilicia, minted in Myriandrus, 361–333 BC (circa)

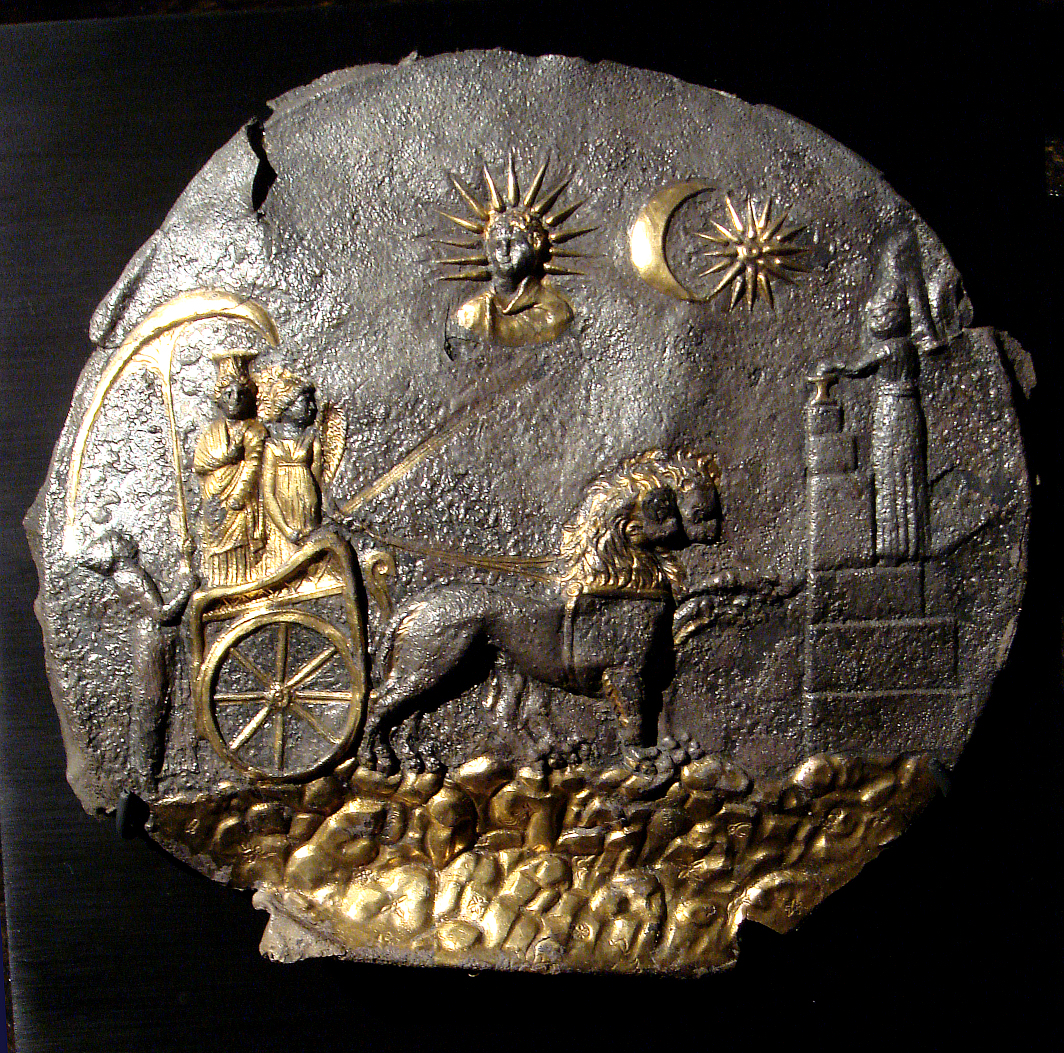
The sixteen-rayed "Vergina Sun" design on the "Cybele Plaque" from Ai Khanoum, Bactria (3rd century BC). The "sunburst" here represents a star, not the Sun, shown in a star and crescent configuration alongside Helios, who is shown separately in the form of a bust with a rayed halo of thirteen rays.

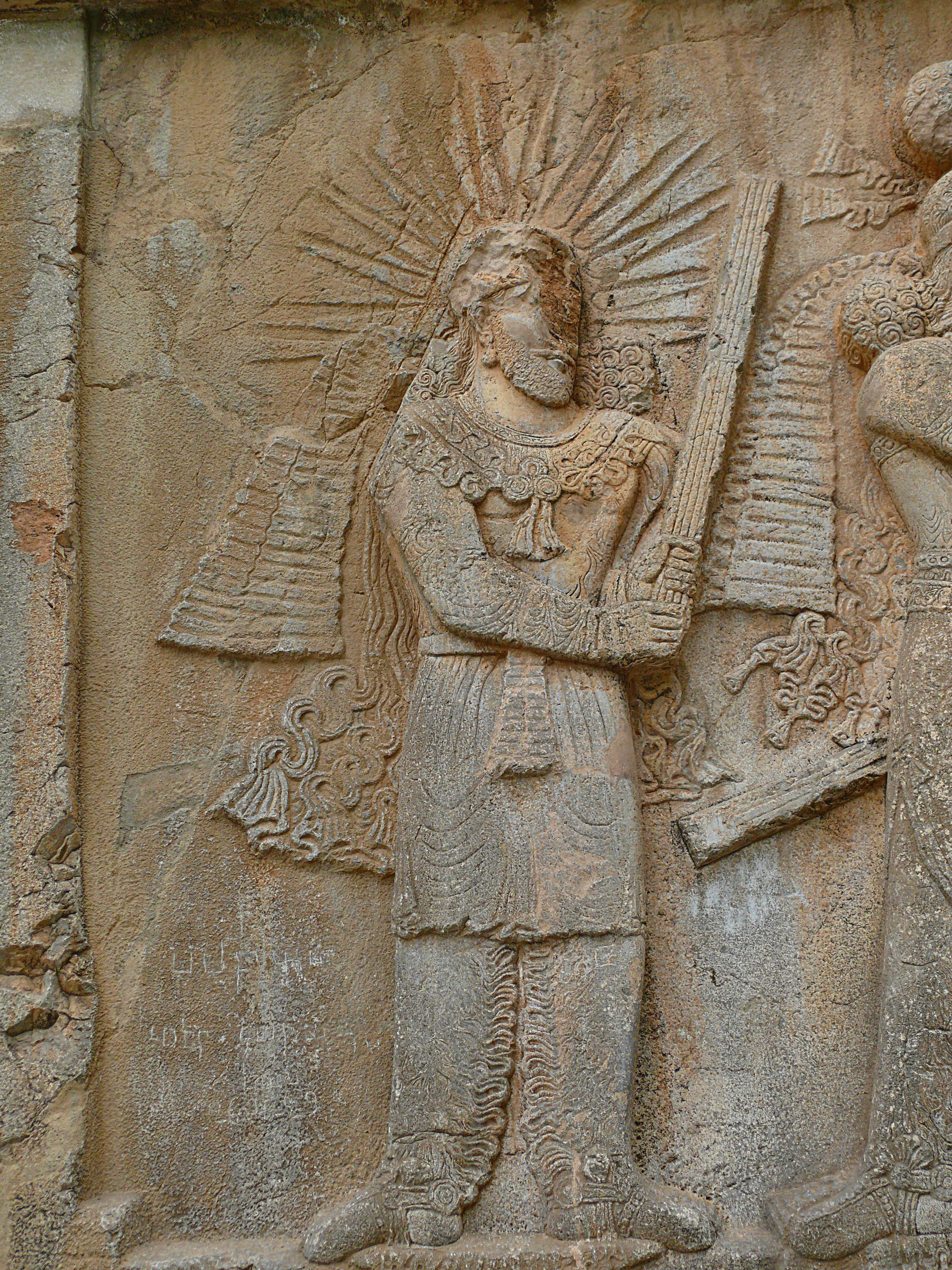
A relief sculpture depicting Mithra with a radiate solar crown (Taq-e Bostan, ca. 4th century CE)

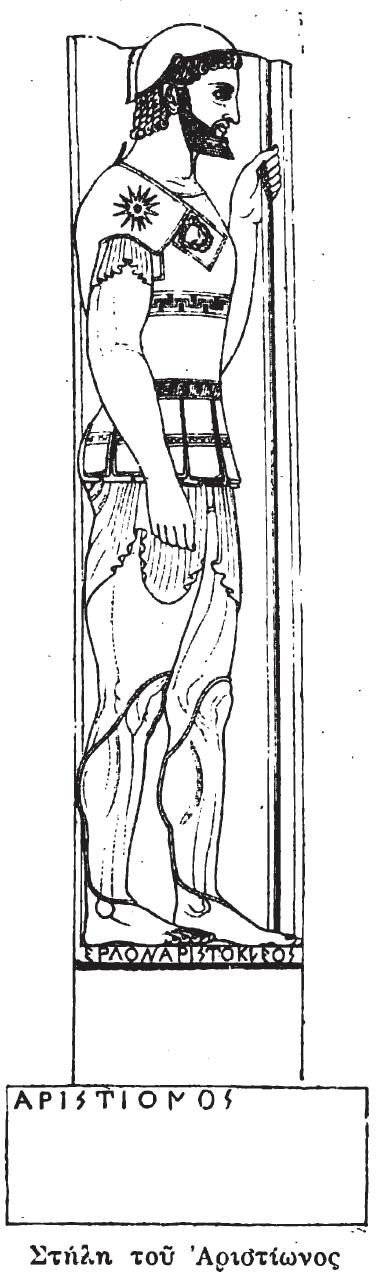
A drawing of the "Stele of Aristion", from the collections of Harvard University, 1894. Funerary stele of an Athenian hoplite (Aristion) having a sixteen-pointed Vergina sun symbol on his right shoulder, c. 520 BC. Relief at the National Archaeological Museum, Athens.

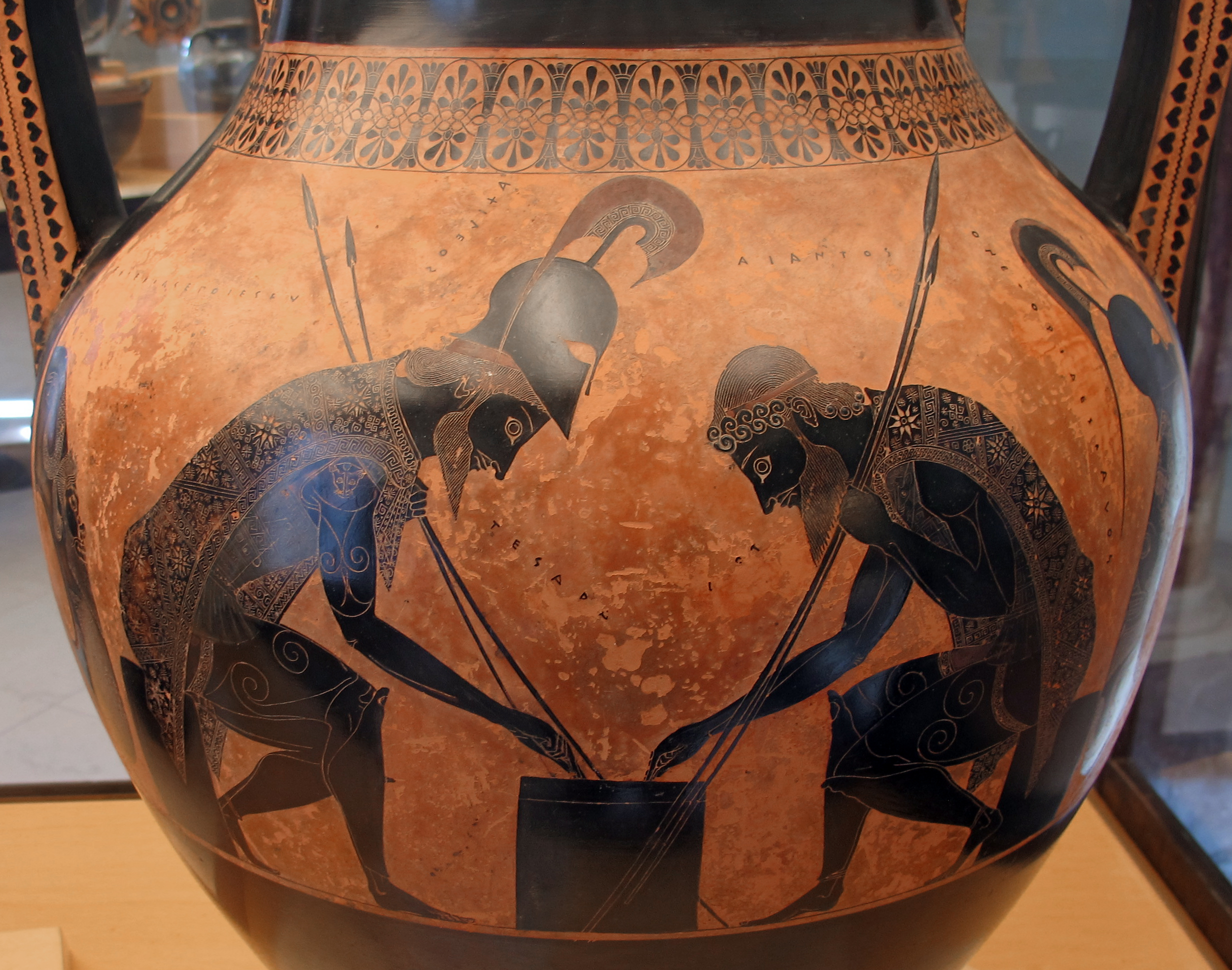
Achilles and Ajax playing a board game. Eight-pointed sun symbols are depicted on their cloaks. Amphora by Exekias, 6th century BC, Vatican Museum.

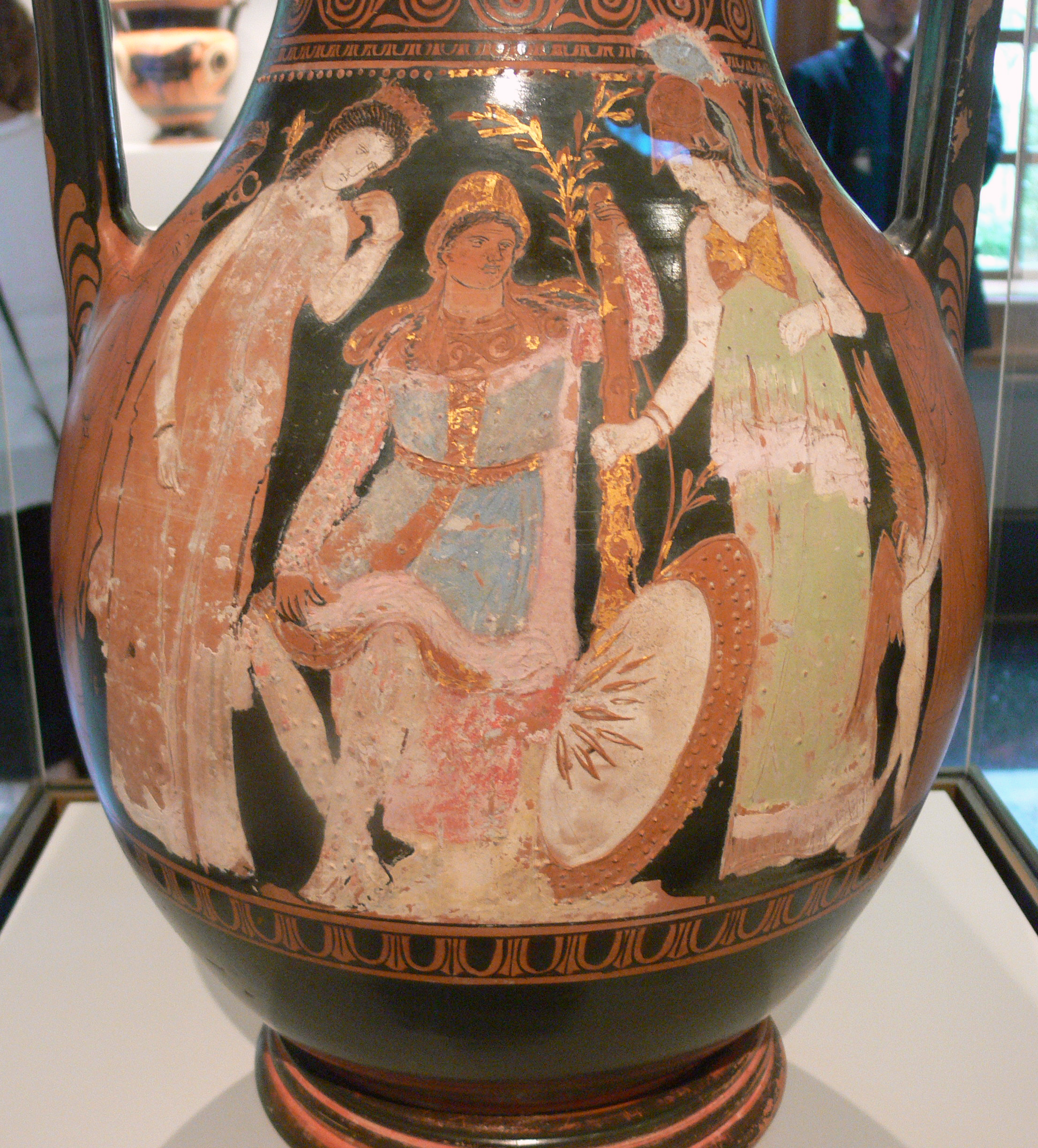
A Vergina sun on Athena's shield. Pithos with the Judgment of Paris, from Athens (4th century BC).

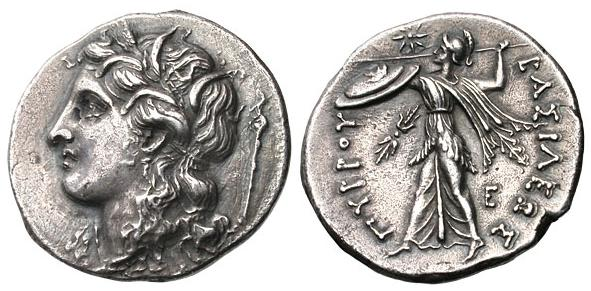
Ancient Greek coin of Pyrrhus, Kingdom of Epirus (r. 297–272 BC). An eight-pointed sun symbol before Athena's face.

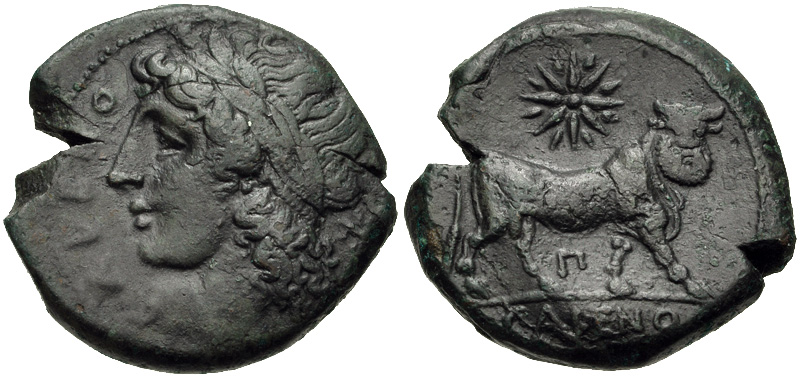
Ancient Greek coin from Campania, Italy (3rd century BC). A Vergina sun symbol is depicted above the bull.

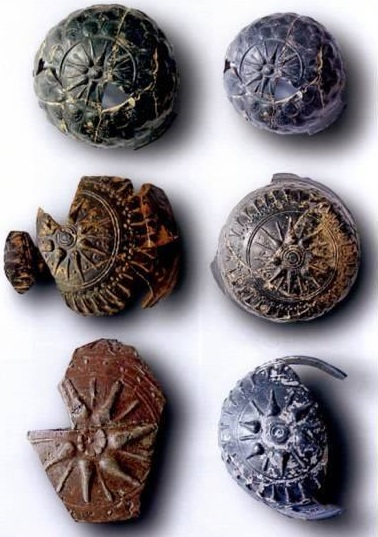
Ancient megarian cups depicting the sixteen-rayed Macedonian sunburst (3rd-2nd centuries BC) found in Ohrid, North Macedonia

The star motif is clearly visible in the ceiling decoration. Entrance Hall, British Museum 1847. Watercolour by Leonard William Collmann and Alfred Stevens.

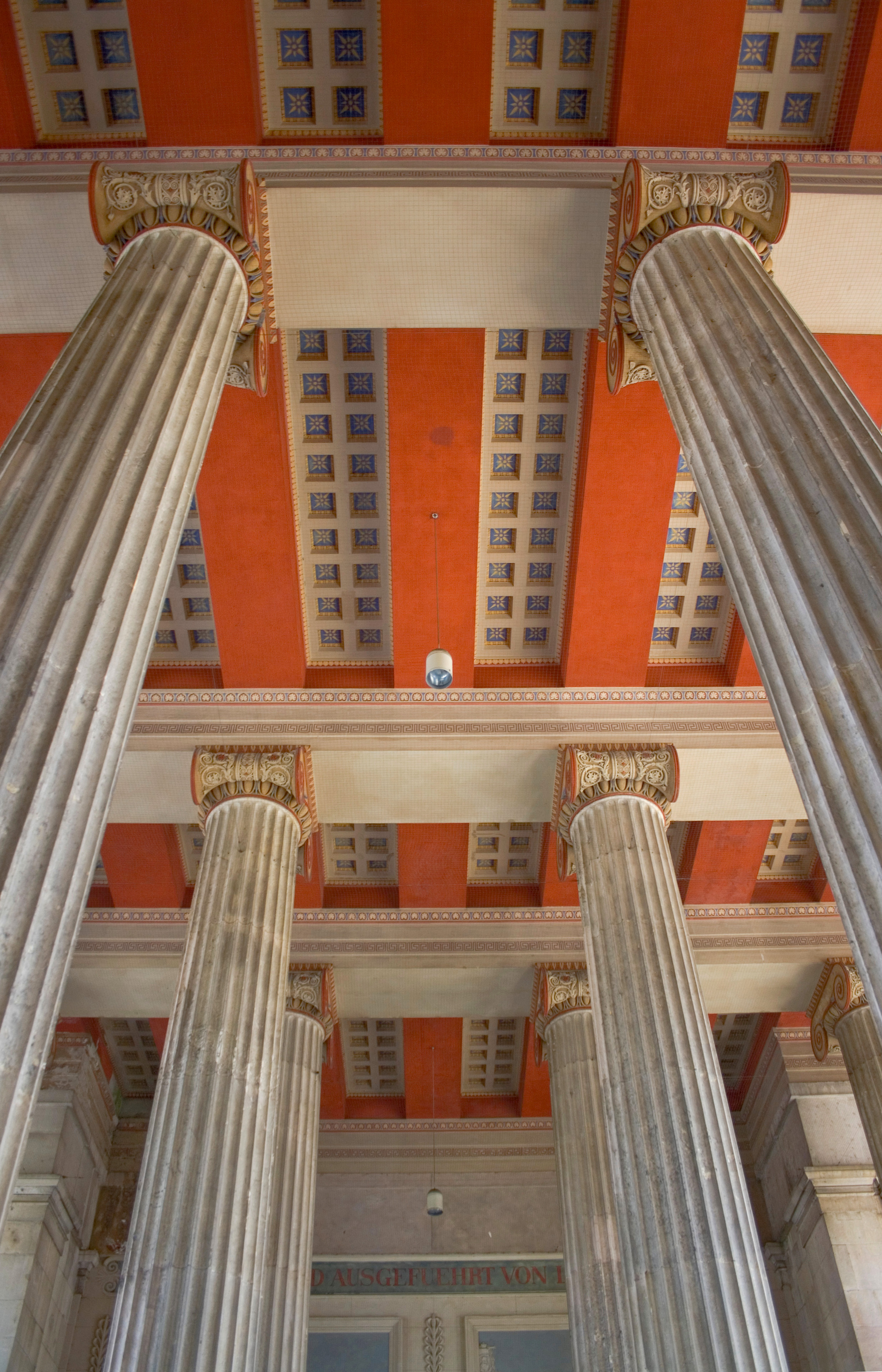
The star motif is painted in celling coffers. Propylaea of Königsplatz, Munich.

The star motif is clearly visible in the ceiling of the portico. Academy of Athens.

== Modern reception ==
=== Official status in Greece ===
The Vergina Sun, designated as an official national symbol by the Hellenic Parliament since February 1993, appears on the (unofficial) flag of Greek Macedonia.

The symbol was introduced in Greece as popular imagery from the mid-1980s, and after 1991, increasingly so in many new contexts in Greece. The Vergina Sun was widely adopted by Greek Macedonians as a symbol of Greek Macedonia. The Vergina Sun on a blue background became commonly used as an official emblem of the three administrative regions, the prefectures and the municipalities of Greek Macedonia.

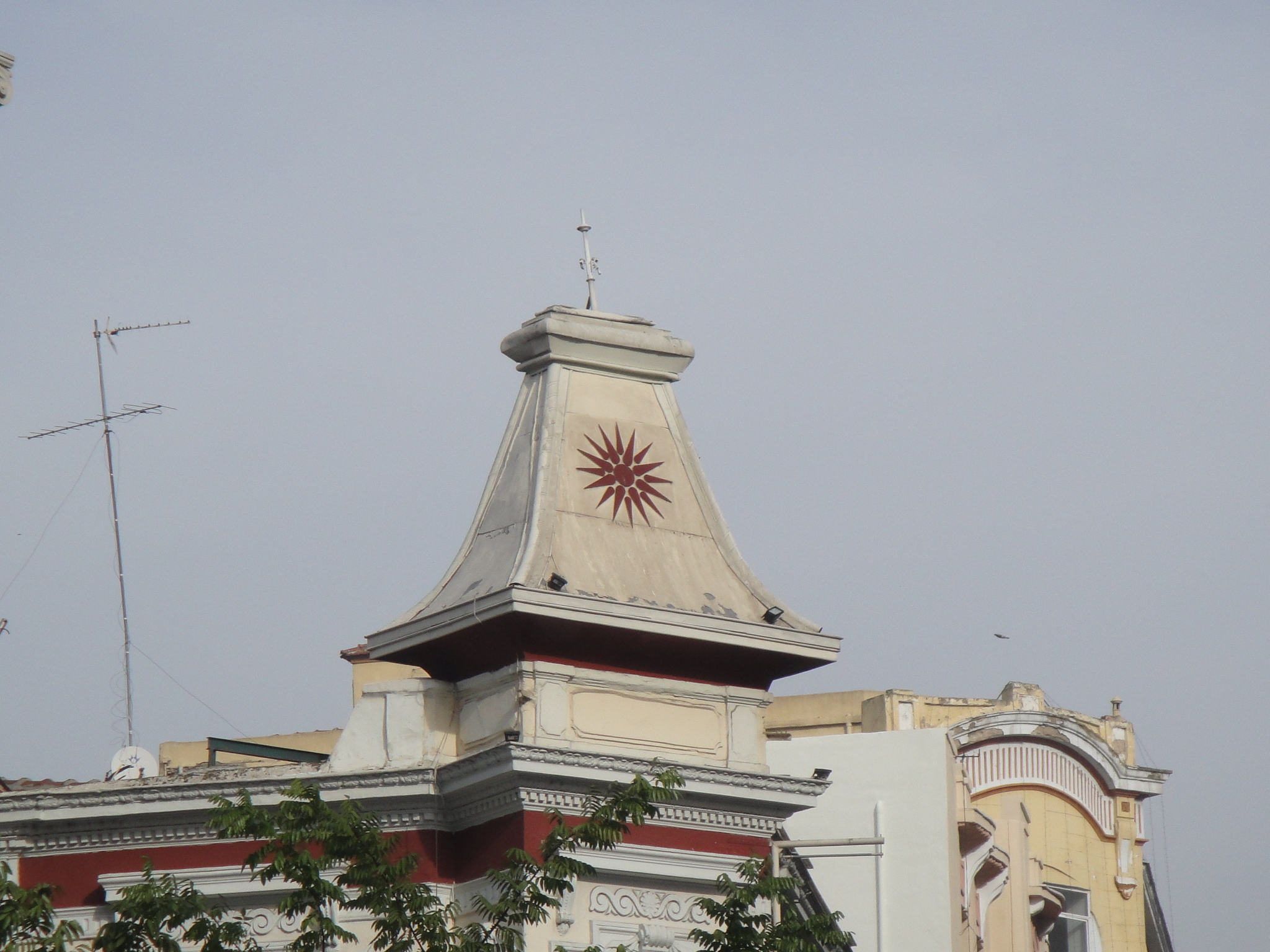
Vergina Sun on a building, Thessaloniki

It was used in official contexts on the reverse of the Greek 100 drachmas coin of 1990–2001, The symbol is placed on the bottom left corner of the Greek driving license, and on Greek passports, it forms the watermark image across pages 22 and 23. It is the emblem of the 3rd Greek Squadron of Control and Warning Station, of Greek Units for the Reinstatement of Order, the Greek First Army, the 193 Squadron of Multiple Missile Launchers and the 34th Mechanized Infantry Brigade. The symbol is also featured in the front side of the new identity card within a hologram of the coat of arms.

In February 1993 the Greek parliament passed a bill designating the Vergina Sun as an official Greek national symbol. In July 1995, Greece lodged a claim for trademark protection of the Vergina Sun as an official state emblem under Article 6ter of the Paris Convention for the Protection of Industrial Property with the World Intellectual Property Organization (WIPO).

==== Greece and Greek Macedonian diaspora ====
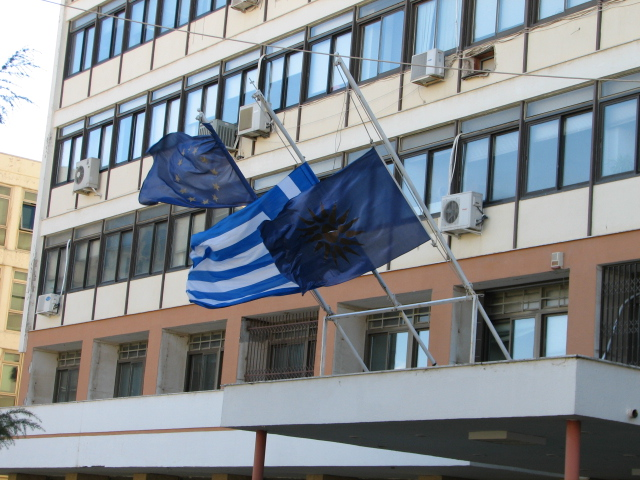
Vergina Sun flag at the Kozani Prefecture, along with the European flag and the flag of Greece

An eight-point sun is the logo of the Museum of the Royal Tombs of Aigai (Vergina) and Thessaloniki International Film Festival. A sixteen-pointed sun appears on Municipality of Chalkidona coat of arms in Thessaloniki region unit, on Municipalities of Veria, Kassandra in Chalkidiki and Almopia coat of arms, on Panserraikos F.C. logo which is a professional first division club from Serres, on Makedonikos FC (Greek: Μακεδονικός) logo which is a Greek professional football club based in Neapoli, on ASF ALEXANDRIAS, A.S MAKEDONAS and G.A.S ALEXANDRIAS in Imathia, on Makedonikos Foufas F.C. in Kozani, on MAS VERGINA FC, on Philippos Alexandreia F.C. in Imathia, on Megas Alexandros BC in Leptokarya, on VERGINA BC in Kalamaria, on A.E Evosmos F.C, Macedonia Efkarpia F.C, on Megas Alexandros Eleonas F.C and on Heidelberg United FC based in the northern Melbourne suburb of Heidelberg West, Victoria, Australia. It is also used by organisations of the Greek Macedonian diaspora, such as the Pan-Macedonian Association, as well as by numerous commercial enterprises and in Greek Macedonian demonstrations. Outside of official usage, the symbol was also used in the logo of the Thessaloniki-based Makedonia television station, and of the former Bank of Macedonia-Thrace. A six-pointed Vergina sun is the logo of the Thessaloniki-based Vergina television station.

An eight-point sun is part of the logo of Greek Parliament party Greek Solution. A seven-pointed sun is the logo of Thessaloniki-based political party EPOS. A sixteen-pointed sun was the logo of Athens-based political party Patriotic Union (Greek: Πατριωτική Ένωση). In 2023, it was reported that the Supreme Civil and Criminal Court of Greece ruled that a political party may not use the symbol as a party emblem.

=== North Macedonia ===
The flag of then Republic of Macedonia between 1992 and 1995

In North Macedonia, the symbol is known as Sun of Kutleš (Macedonian: Сонце од Кутлеш). In 1992, Todor Petrov proposed the Vergina Sun as the national symbol of the newly declared Republic of Macedonia (now North Macedonia). The symbol was adopted by the country in the same year, displaying it on its new flag. This lasted until 1995, when the Republic of Macedonia was forced to modify its flag by Greece. The decision in the Republic of Macedonia caused controversy both within the republic and outside it in its relations with Greece. The republic's large Albanian minority complained that it was an ethnic Macedonian symbol and was not suitable for a multi-ethnic state. Greek opposition was even more vehement. The Greek government and many Greek people, especially Greek Macedonians, saw it as the misappropriation of a Hellenic symbol and a direct claim on the legacy of Philip II. The dispute was exacerbated by clauses in the Republic of Macedonia's constitution that Greeks saw as a territorial claim on the Greek region of Macedonia. A Greek Foreign Ministry spokesman said in January 1995 that "the symbol is Greek and has been stolen." Nationalists on both sides subsequently associated the symbol with the (much later) Star of Bethlehem and have argued that their respective communities have used the symbol for sacred purposes before the Vergina discovery.

Speaking on the BBC World Service's The World Today programme, archaeologist Bajana Mojsov from the Republic of Macedonia said that "the symbolic weight attached to the Vergina Star was archaeologically absurd – but politically inevitable," arguing:

The star of Vergina applies to the 3rd century BC northern Greece – a very different situation, not related to the 21st century AD. I think it's modern politics, and we're witnessing the use of an archaeological symbol for history that it's really not related to.

At the same time, Demetrius Floudas, Senior Associate at Hughes Hall, Cambridge, and one of the leading analysts of the Macedonia naming dispute, claimed that:

what prompted the adoption of the Vergina Star was a desire from Skopje's part to advance maximalist objectives in order to barter with them for other concessions at the negotiating table when the time comes.

Although the authorities in Skopje denied any ulterior motives, the flag became a major issue in the wider political dispute between the two countries of the early 1990s (see Foreign relations of North Macedonia). Greek objections led to the flag being banned from use in a variety of places, including the United Nations, the Olympic Games and offices of the Republic of Macedonia in the United States and Australia. The Republic of Macedonia lodged an objection against Greece's registration of the symbol with WIPO in October 1995. The dispute was partially resolved under a compromise brokered by Cyrus Vance at the United Nations. The symbol was removed from the flag of the Republic of Macedonia as part of an agreement to establish diplomatic and economic relations between the two sides, and it was replaced by a stylised yellow sun with eight widening beams on red ground. The symbol was not referred to as the "Star of Vergina" in the agreement as signed, although the Greeks described it as such in correspondence with Vance.

The Liberal Party (LP) of the Republic of Macedonia, in November 2013, via its president Ivon Velickovski, proposed a draft law to ban the use of the Vergina Sun for civil purposes within the Republic of Macedonia, as "a positive step that will result in the promotion of good neighborly relations between Macedonia and Greece". The draft law required the use of the WIPO-protected Greek symbol to be banned in the Macedonian president's office, events organized under state administration, public Macedonian institutions or political parties, NGOs, media, as well as individuals in the Republic of Macedonia. The draft however was rejected in December 2013 by the majority of the Macedonian Parliament, which at the time was controlled by the nationalist VMRO-DPMNE party. Toni Deskoski, Macedonian professor of International Law and member of the legal team that represented the Republic of Macedonia in the naming dispute with Greece before the International Court of Justice in the Hague for violation of the Interim Accord, argues that the Vergina Sun is not an ethnic Macedonian symbol but it is a Greek symbol that is used by ethnic Macedonians in the nationalist context of Macedonism and that the Macedonians need to get rid of it.

==== Prespa Agreement ====
On 17 June 2018, Greece and the Republic of Macedonia signed the Prespa Agreement, which stipulates the removal of the Vergina Sun from public use across the latter's territory. In a session held on early July 2019, the government of North Macedonia announced the complete removal of the Vergina Sun from all public areas, institutions and monuments in the country, with the deadline for its removal being set to 12 August 2019, in line with the Prespa Agreement. Nonetheless, the municipality of Makedonska Kamenica still displays it on its municipal flag.

==== Ethnic Macedonian diaspora ====
A similar choice was made by the municipality of Liqenas in neighbouring Albania, which has a Macedonian population. The symbol is also used by other ethnic Macedonian minority groups in neighbouring countries and by diaspora organisations. In Canada, a Macedonian advocacy group called United Macedonians Organization uses a stylized version of the sun as part of its logo and makes extensive use of the red Vergina Sun flag.

In early August 2017, the Macedonian consul in Toronto, Canada, Jovica Palashevski, sparked a diplomatic incident between the Republic of Macedonia and Greece, when he delivered a speech against the backdrop of an irredentist map of Greater Macedonia and a red Vergina Sun flag. After strong Greek protests, the Foreign Ministry of the Republic of Macedonia condemned the incident and recalled its diplomat back to Skopje for consultations.

In 2018, IP Australia, the agency of the Australian Department of Industry, Innovation and Science responsible for administering the intellectual property rights in Australia, denied the World Macedonian Congress the right of registering and using the Vergina Sun on its trademark, citing the Paris Convention which recognizes the emblem as a national symbol of Greece. In 2026, an ethnic Macedonian community group in Melbourne was not allowed to parade with the Vergina Sun flag at the 2026 Moomba Festival, as the City of Melbourne had banned the display of cultural flags.

=== Aromanians ===
An eight-pointed version of the Vergina Sun has been used by some members of the stateless Balkan ethnic group of the Aromanians. According to University of Warwick professor Tom Winnifrith, some houses in Kruševo (Aromanian: Crushuva), a town in North Macedonia with a substantial Aromanian population, use star patterns resembling the Vergina Sun. Some Aromanians claim heritage from the ancient Macedonians.

== See also ==
- Inti
- Pella
- Classical Greece
- Radiate crown
- Solar deity
- Solar symbol
- Sun (heraldry)
- Sun of May
