= Makedonsko Sonce =

Македонско сонце Makedonsko Sonce
- Type: Monthly newspaper
- Owner(s): Gorgija- George Atanasoski
- Founder(s): Gorgija- George Atanasoski
- Publisher: Evropa'92
- Editor: Aleksandar Katlanovski
- Founded: June 24, 1994; 31 years ago
- Headquarters: 16 Makedonska brigade 18; Skopje, North Macedonia
- Website: www.makedonskosonce.com

Makedonsko Sonce (Macedonian: Македонско Сонце; English: Macedonian Sun) is a monthly magazine published in North Macedonia. The title means "Macedonian Sun", referring to the Vergina Sun, which is used in the logo of the magazine. It was established by Gjorgija (George) Atanasoski and the first edition was published on June 24, 1994. In the first two decades, the magazine had weekly editions, but in the last few years it is published once a month. It describes its own political stance as affirming "Macedonian national values, not only on territory of Macedonia but also in the other parts of ethnic Macedonia".
