= 2004 Macedonian autonomy referendum =

7 November 2004
- Are you in favor of the territorial organization of local self-government (municipalities and the city of Skopje) determined by the Law on the Territorial Division of the Republic of Macedonia and Determination of the Areas of Local Self-Government Units ("Official Gazette of the Republic of Macedonia" no. 49/96) and the Law on the city of Skopje ("Official Gazette of the Republic of Macedonia no. 49/96)?
- Outcome: Proposal failed as voter turnout was below 50%

Results
Choice	Votes	%
Yes	427,112	95.06%
No	22,212	4.94%
Valid votes	449,324	98.89%
Invalid or blank votes	5,023	1.11%
Total votes	454,347	100.00%
Registered voters/turnout	1,709,536	26.58%

An autonomy referendum was held in Macedonia on 7 November 2004. Voters were asked whether they approved of overturning the municipal redistricting plans that gave greater autonomy to ethnic Albanians following the Ohrid Agreement that ended the 2001 conflict between ethnic Albanian militants and the predominantly ethnic Macedonian government forces. These had been changed to give ethnic Albanians greater control in districts where they had significant presence and gives local authorities greater control over education, health and development. It also reduced the number of municipalities from 123 to 84.

Although 95% voted in favour of the change, the voter turnout of 27% was well below the 50% threshold, resulting in it failing.

== Background ==
The referendum was initiated by the World Macedonian Congress, led by Todor Petrov, whose "group of Voters" party won 0.25% of the vote in the 1998 parliamentary election. It was backed by conservative parties, notably VMRO-DPMNE, and non-Albanian ethnic minority parties. Backers were opposed to the Ohrid Accord and said the law was divisive and would lead to the breakup of the Republic of Macedonia.

The then Prime Minister, Hari Kostov said he would quit if the referendum succeeded and urged voters to boycott the vote, so it would fail to meet the 50% turnout requirement.

The European Union and United States also urged a boycott, and said that accession to the EU and NATO would be more difficult. Four days before the vote the United States announced they would start referring to the country as the Republic of Macedonia rather than the former Yugoslav Republic of Macedonia in a move said to strengthen the government position.

Prior to the vote, a Macedonian newspaper carried a story suggesting that if the referendum succeeded, Albanian militants had planned to blow up a pipeline carrying water to the capital Skopje.

Opinion polls prior to the vote suggested support of between 56 and 65% of voters.

== Question ==
Are you for the territorial organization of the local self-government (the municipalities and City of Skopje) as determined by the Law on Territorial Division of the Republic of Macedonia and Determination of the Areas of the Local Self-Government Units (Official Gazette of the Republic of Macedonia no. 49/1996) and the Law on the City of Skopje (Official Gazette of the Republic of Macedonia no. 49/1996).

== Results ==
Choice	Votes	%
For	427,112	95.06
Against	22,212	4.94
Total	449,324	100.00
Valid votes	449,324	98.89
Invalid/blank votes	5,023	1.11
Total votes	454,347	100.00
Registered voters/turnout	1,709,536	26.58
Source: IFES
