= History of the Macedonians (ethnic group) =

The history of Macedonians has been shaped by population shifts and political developments in the Balkans, especially within the region of Macedonia. The ideas of separate Macedonian identity grew in significance after the World War I, both in Vardar Macedonia and among the left-leaning diaspora in Bulgaria, and were endorsed by the Comintern in 1934. During the World War II, these ideas were supported by the Macedonian Partisans, but the decisive point in the ethnogenesis of this South Slavic people was the creation of the Socialist Republic of Macedonia as a new state within the framework of Yugoslavia.

== Ancient period ==
The region of present-day North Macedonia has been inhabited since Paleolithic times. It occupies most of the ancient kingdom of Paeonia. The Paeonians founded several princedoms, which coalesced into a kingdom in the central and upper reaches of the Vardar and Struma rivers, centered at Bylazora. In 356 BC Paeonia became subject to Philip II. The kingdom of Dardania, inhabited by the Dardani, included Scupi, near modern Skopje. Pelagonia and Derriopos, which became part of the kingdom of Macedon in the mid 4th century BC, corresponded roughly to what is now Pelagonia Statistical Region.

The Roman province of Macedonia was officially established in 146 BC after the Fourth Macedonian War. Pausanias described that Paeon, the eponymous ancestor of the Paionians, was a brother of Epeius and Aetolus, the eponymous ancestors of the Epeians of Elis and the Aetolians respectively. Anson writes that "this notice from Pausanias may suggest that at least by the second century AD the Paeonians were seen as part of the Greek community". By the 4th century AD the area of present-day North Macedonia had become Hellenized or Romanized.

== Middle Ages ==
During most of Late Antiquity and the early Middles ages, the Diocese of Macedonia had been a province of the Byzantine Empire. In the 6th century AD, most of North Macedonia was part of Macedonia Salutaris with Stobi as its capital.

=== Arrival and Settlement of the Slavs ===
The Slavic tribes invaded the Balkan Peninsula in the 5th, 6th, and 7th centuries CE, settling in the Danube river basin and the region of Macedonia, and encountering the Byzantine population who lived in the region. According to Procopius, the first attack on Byzantium took place in 523 and later in 617-619 by the Draguvites and Sagudates. Initially, the Slavic tribes retained independent rule with their own political structure. These units were referred to as Sclaviniae or Zhupas.

Successive Byzantine emperors tried to directly incorporate the Slavs of the region of Macedonia into the socio-economic system of the Byzantine state, with varied success. Emperors Constans II (656) and Justinian II (686) had to resort to military expeditions and forced re-settlement of large numbers of Slavs to Anatolia, forcing them to pay tribute and supply military aid to the empire.

==== Arrival of Kuber and the Sermesianoi ====
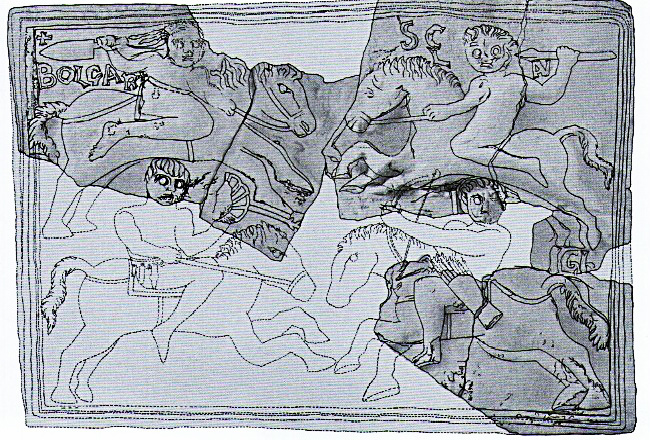
Reconstruction of terracotta tile found in Vinica, which depicts a battle between Bulgars and Early Slavs.

Historical records document that in 682AD - 685AD a Bulgar ruler called Kuber and his subjects settled in the region of Keramisian plain, centred on the city of Bitola in that time part of the Byzantine Empire. Kuber was a chief, who was vassaled to the Avar Khagan. However, whilst he was certainly a Bulgar, he was made chief of a settlement consisting of the descendants of various peoples who had been subjugated by the Avars and actively re-settled in Sirmium, nearer to the Khanate's centre. They may have consisted of Bulgars, Byzantine soldiers and mercenaries, Slavs and even Germanic peoples such as Gepids and Franks. They referred to themselves as Sermesianoi, and at 680 AD they rebelled against the Avars and departed from Sirmium towards the Byzantine Empire. There is no more information of Kuber's life or the Sermesianoi. They had close contacts and may have merged with the Slavic tribe called Dragoviti, who were already established in the area. Some sources suggest Kuber was the brother of Khan Asparuh, who founded the Danubian Bulgarian state in 681, known as First Bulgarian Empire in southeastern Europe. According to Bulgarian historians in the following decades, these people launched campaigns against the Byzantine city of Salonica and established contacts with Danubian Bulgaria. By the early 9th century the lands that Kuber settled had been incorporated into the First Bulgarian Empire. The archaeologist from Macedonian Academy of Sciences and Arts, Professor Ivan Mikulčić, revealed that in the region of Prilep graves were discovered which most likely belong to the Bulgar tribe Kutrigurs which were part of the Sermesianoi. However, Kuber planned an attack on Salonica which was discovered by the Byzantines and he and the Kutrigurs were banished from these parts and set out for the region of Northern Epirus to settle there. In Erseke and Vrap there was a treasure found with supposed Bulgar origin or ownership. However, it is likely that these artefact actually represent evidence of Avar presence in the region, which fits with known historiography. Truly, there were vast similarities between early Avar and Bulgar material culture found in Old Bulgaria.

=== Christianization and adoption of Cyrillic alphabet ===
The historical phenomenon of Christianization, the conversion of individuals to Christianity or the conversion of entire peoples at once, also includes the practice of converting pagan practices, pagan religious imagery, pagan sites and the pagan calendar to Christian uses. After Roman Empire was declared a Christian Empire by Theodosius I in 389, laws were passed against pagan practices over the course of the following years. The Slavic tribes in Macedonia accepted Christianity as their own religion around the 9th century mainly during the reign of prince Boris I of Bulgaria. The Christianization of Bulgaria was the process of converting 9th century medieval Bulgaria to Christianity as state religion.

The creators of the Glagolitic alphabet were the Byzantine Christian monks Saint Cyril and Saint Methodius. Under the guidance of the Patriarchate at Constantinople they were promoters of Christianity and initiated Slavic literacy among the Slavic people. They developed their alphabet from their extensive knowledge of the local Slavic dialect spoken in the hinterland of Thessaloniki, which became the basis for Old Church Slavonic, the first literary Slavic language. Their work was accepted in early medieval Bulgaria and continued by Clement of Ohrid, creator of the Cyrillic script and Naum of Ohrid as founders of the Ohrid Literary School. Cyril and Methodius evangelized from Constantinople into the Balkans In the legacy of Cyril and Methodius, carried on by Clement and Naum, the development of Slavic literacy was crucial in preventing assimilation of the Slavs either by cultures to the North or by the Greek culture to the south. The introduction of Slavic liturgy paralleled Boris I's continued development of churches and monasteries throughout his realm.

=== First Bulgarian empire ===
In the early 9th century, most of the region of Macedonia (as well as other large parts of the Balkan peninsula), excluding its coastal parts and the area of Thessaloniki, were incorporated into the First Bulgarian Empire. With the defeat of the Bulgarian empire by Byzantium in the mid 10th century, the eastern part of the Bulgarian empire and its capital Preslav were annexed into the Byzantine Empire. The western part, covering most of present-day North Macedonia, continued to be ruled by the Tsar Samuil of Bulgaria, who saw himself as the successor of the Bulgarian Empire. Samuil ruled his kingdom from the island of St. Achilles in Prespa. He was crowned in Rome in 997 as Tsar of Bulgaria by Pope Gregory V. The remains of his castle are still present in the city of Ohrid. Under Samuil, the fortunes of the empire and the great military rivalry against Byzantines were once more revived, albeit temporarily. However, Samuil's army was soundly defeated in 1014 by the Byzantine emperor Basil II The Bulgar-Slayer, member of the Macedonian dynasty. Four years later the Bulgarian empire fell once again under Byzantine control, and remained up until the 13th century, when the region was briefly passed to Latin, Bulgarian and back to Byzantine rule. Konstantin Asen, a former nobleman from Skopje, ruled over much of the region as the Tsar of Bulgaria from 1257 to 1277.

=== Serbian empire ===
From the mid-14th century, most of Macedonia was incorporated into the Serbian Kingdom. The Serbs saw themselves as liberators of their Slavic kin. Macedonia was very urbanised and lay along the important trade routes, thus it became the centre of Tsar Stefan Dušan's empire, making Skopje his capital. With his death the region fell under leadership of local nobles, who divided his territories between them. King Marko became the new king in 1371 AD in parts of northwestern Macedonia, with the capital at Prilep in Pelagonia. Grammarist and historian Krste Petkov Misirkov mentions that according to contemporary historical sources and documents, the surname of King Marko was unknown. Disunited, the Balkan provinces fell to the emerging Ottoman Empire one by one.

=== Ottoman rule ===
This expansion of medieval states on the Balkan Peninsula was discontinued by the occupation of the Ottoman Empire in the late 14th century. The region of Macedonia remained part of the Ottoman Empire for the next 500 years, until 1912. Islamization (meaning the process of a society's conversion to the religion of Islam, or a neologism meaning an increase in observance by an already Muslim society) and Turkification (a cultural change in which someone who is not a Turk becomes one, voluntarily or by force) followed. Both terms can be used in contexts of connection with various Slavic people in Macedonia (Pomaks, Torbesh, and Gorani), which converted to Islam during the Ottoman rule. Overall, the large majority of local Bulgarians remained Christian.

== Modern era ==
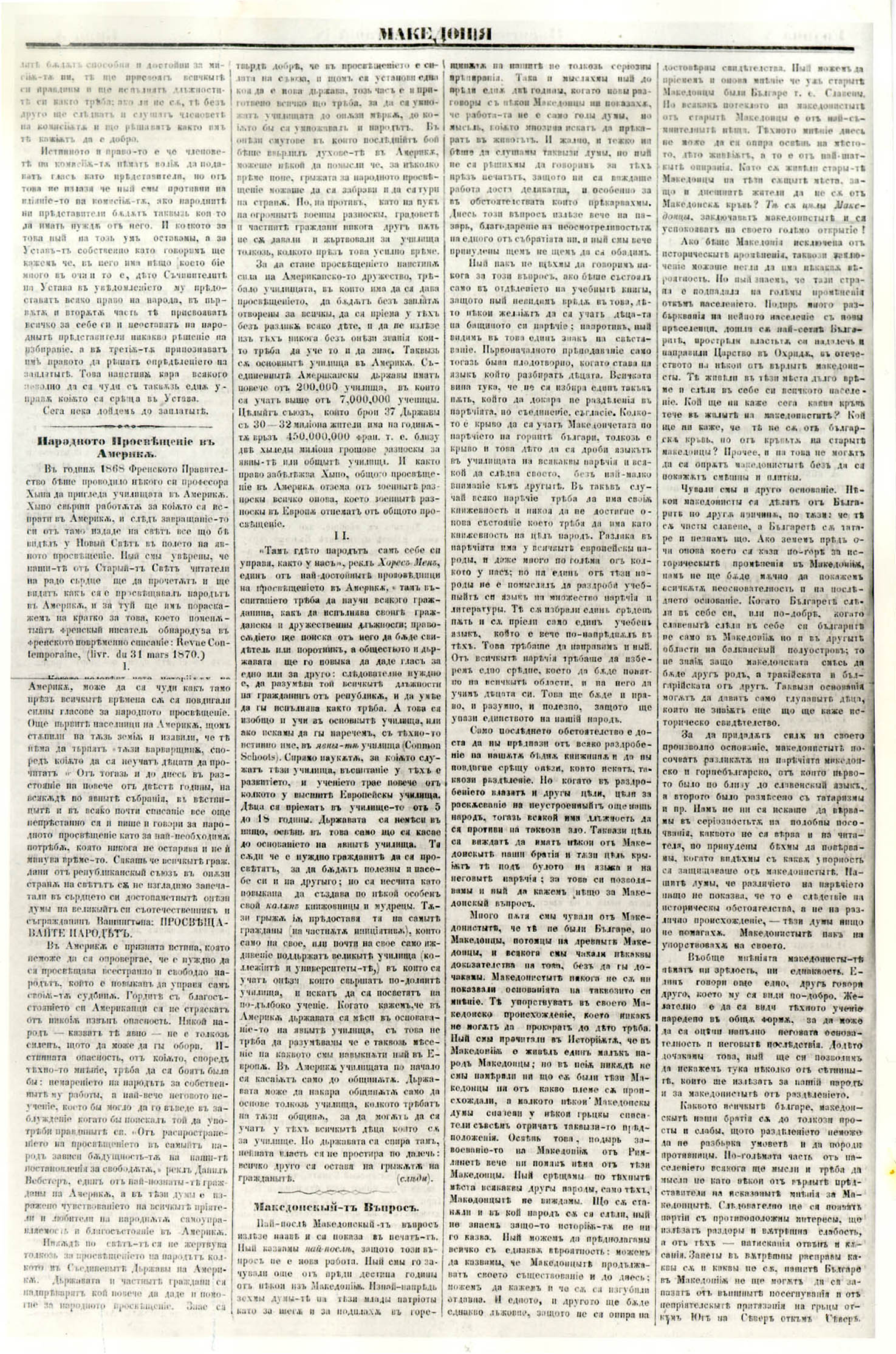
The first page of Petko Slaveykov's article "The Macedonian question" published 18 January 1871, in which he mentions that some people from Macedonia declare themselves as separate people - Macedonians, different from Bulgarians. Those people he refers to as "Macedonists"

During the rule of the Ottomans, the local Bulgarians, Serbs, Albanians and others organized a number of uprisings: Mariovo uprising (1564), Karposh's Rebellion (1689), Kresna-Razlog Uprising (1878) etc. According to the Preliminary Treaty of San Stefano between the Russian and the Ottoman Empire signed at the end of the Russo-Turkish War (1877–78), most of Macedonia was granted to the new autonomous self-governing Principality of Bulgaria. However, the Great Powers, particularly England and Austria grew alarmed with what they saw as extension of Russian power, since Bulgaria was a fellow Slavic Orthodox country that could be easily swayed by Russia. Additionally, they feared that a too rapid collapse of Ottoman rule could create a dangerous power vacuum. Also, Serbia and Greece held resentment at the establishment of what they saw as a Greater Bulgaria, and felt deprived from the spoils of Ottoman decline. This prompted the Great Powers to obtain a revision of this treaty. The subsequent Congress of Berlin a few months later was a meeting of the European Great Powers' which revised the Treaty of San Stefano. Although Greece and Serbia succeeded in becoming independent Kingdoms, autonomous from Turkey. Bulgaria's lost much of the territory it had gained, losing Thrace and Macedonia back to the Turks. These events all conspired to create tensions which would spill over into war. The issue of irredentism and nationalism gained great prominence after the creation of Greater Bulgaria and Turkish collapse following the 1878 Treaty of San Stefano. In the first half of the 20th century, control over Macedonia was a key point of contention between Bulgaria, Greece, and Serbia.

The Internal Macedonian Revolutionary Organization (IMRO) was founded in 1893 in Ottoman Thessaloniki by a "small band of anti-Ottoman Bulgarian revolutionaries". "They considered Macedonia an indivisible territory and all of its inhabitants, no matter their religion or ethnicity". The organization was secret revolutionary society with aim to make Macedonia an autonomous state but that later became an agent serving Bulgarian interests in Balkan politics. However, the results of the Balkan Wars were not favourable for the members of the IMRO, splitting Macedonia into three parts. The Greek part was heavily Hellenized by re-settlement of Greeks from other provinces, as well as through a governmental policy of linguistic and cultural Hellenization of Slav speakers. The Slavs who lived in the small portion allocated to Bulgaria continued to be considered as Bulgarians. Moreover, Bulgarians in Bulgaria believed that most of the population of Macedonia was Bulgarian. The remaining portion allocated to Serbia, renamed the Vardar Banovina following King Alexander Karadjordjevic's reorganization of the Kingdom of Serbs, Croats, and Slovenes into the Kingdom of Yugoslavia, was subject to a policy of Serbianization, whereby the Macedonian language was deliberately distanced from Bulgarian, and Bulgarian Exarchate authorities were removed. Simultaneously after the Balkan Wars, a new entity began to arise among the Slavic-speaking population — a Macedonian one.

Greece, Bulgaria and Serbia all wished to claim Macedonia, as a key strategic part of their newly formed kingdoms. Throughout the 19th century, each kingdom tried to claim Macedonia as its own. This was done through the media of church and education, particularly between Greece and Bulgaria. Through the advancement of Greek or Bulgarian language, and provision of local priests either from the Bulgarian Exarchate or Orthodox Church of Constantinople, an entire village would be claimed to be 'Greek', while its neighbour would be 'Bulgarian'. This ad hoc arrangement did not follow any geographic or ethnic correlates, and occurred at the expense of the development of a local, Macedonian identity, and often involved harassment of peoples in order to profess loyalty to Greece or Bulgaria, and abdicate profession of any independent identity.

=== Ilinden Uprising and after ===
In 1893, the Macedonian Revolutionary Organization was established, (later called Internal Macedonian-Adrianople Revolutionary Organization [IMARO]). This organization advocated the creation of an autonomous Macedonia and Thrace. The organization was founded in Ottoman Thessaloniki by a "small band of anti-Ottoman Macedono-Bulgarian revolutionaries. "They considered Macedonia an indivisible territory and claimed all of its inhabitants "Macedonians", no matter their religion or ethnicity" (although in practice their followers were primarily of Bulgarian origins). On August 2, 1903, IMRO led the locals in the Ilinden Uprising, named after the festival of the Prophet Elijah on which it began. That was one of the greatest events in the history of the population in the regions of Macedonia and Thrace. The high point of the Ilinden revolution was the establishment of the Kruševo Republic in the town of Kruševo. By November 1903, the Ilinden Uprising was suppressed. The uprising was led by activists of the IMRO including Jane Sandanski, Nikola Karev, Dame Gruev and Pitu Guli

The failure of the 1903 insurrection resulted in the eventual split of the IMRO into a left wing (federalist) and a right wing. The left-wing faction opposed Bulgarian nationalism and advocated the creation of a Balkan Socialist Federation with equality for all subjects and nationalities, including Bulgarians. The right-wing fraction of IMRO drifted more and more towards Bulgarian nationalism as its regions became increasingly exposed to the incursions of Serb, Bulgarian and Greek armed bands, which started infiltrating Macedonia after 1903. The period of time from 1905 to 1907 saw a great deal of violent fighting between the IMRO and Turkish forces as well as between IMRO and Greek and Serb detachments.

After the Young Turk Revolution of 1908, both fractions laid down their arms and joined the legal struggle. The federalist wing welcomed in the revolution of 1908 and later joined mainstream political life as the Peoples' Federative Party (Bulgarian Section). The right wing formed the Bulgarian Constitutional Clubs and like the PFP participated in Ottoman elections.

=== Balkan Wars ===
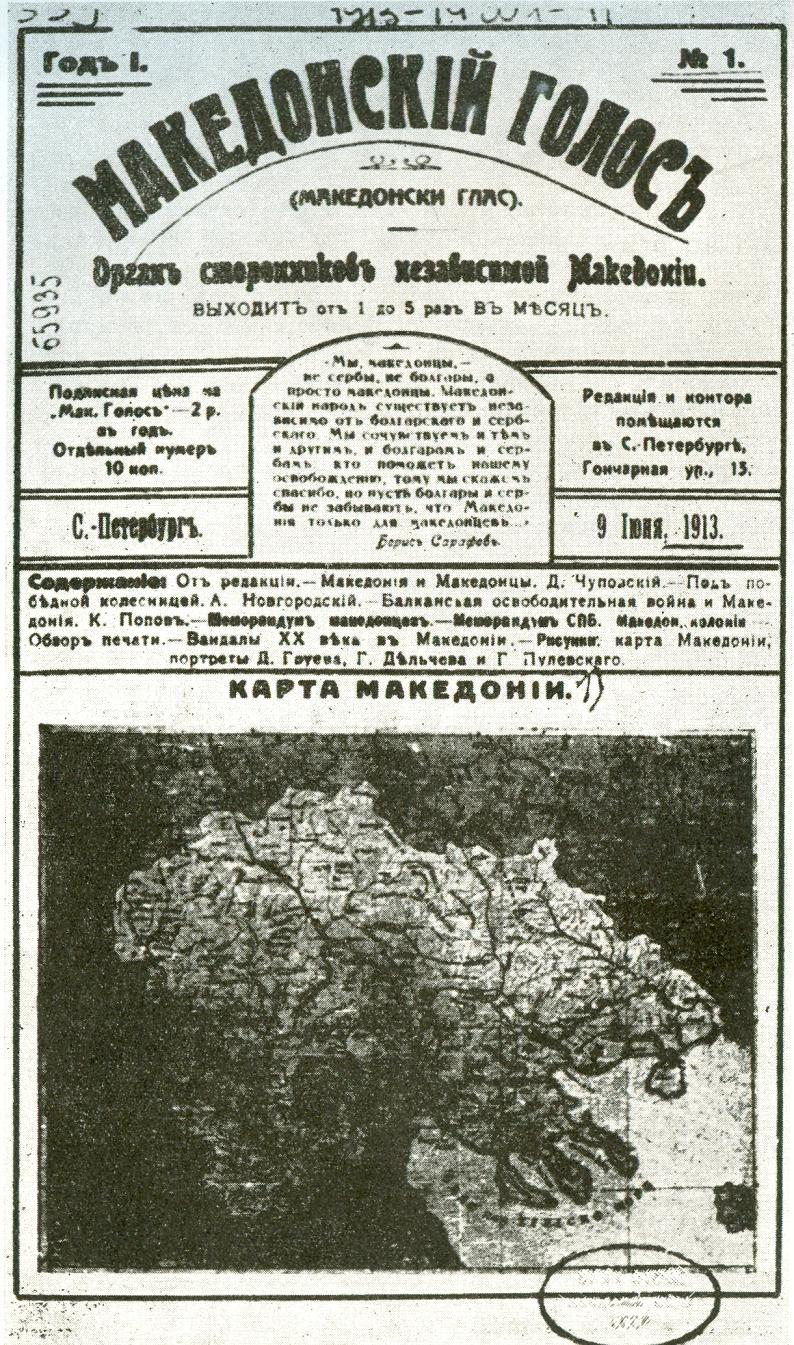
The first number of the Macedonian Voice newspaper published by ethnic Macedonians in Saint Petersburg from 1913 until 1918 by Dimitrija Čupovski and the members of the Macedonian Colony in Peterburg. The newspaper propagated that there existed a "homogenous Slav population possessing its own history, its own way of life" that were neither Serbs nor Bulgarians, but a separate people.

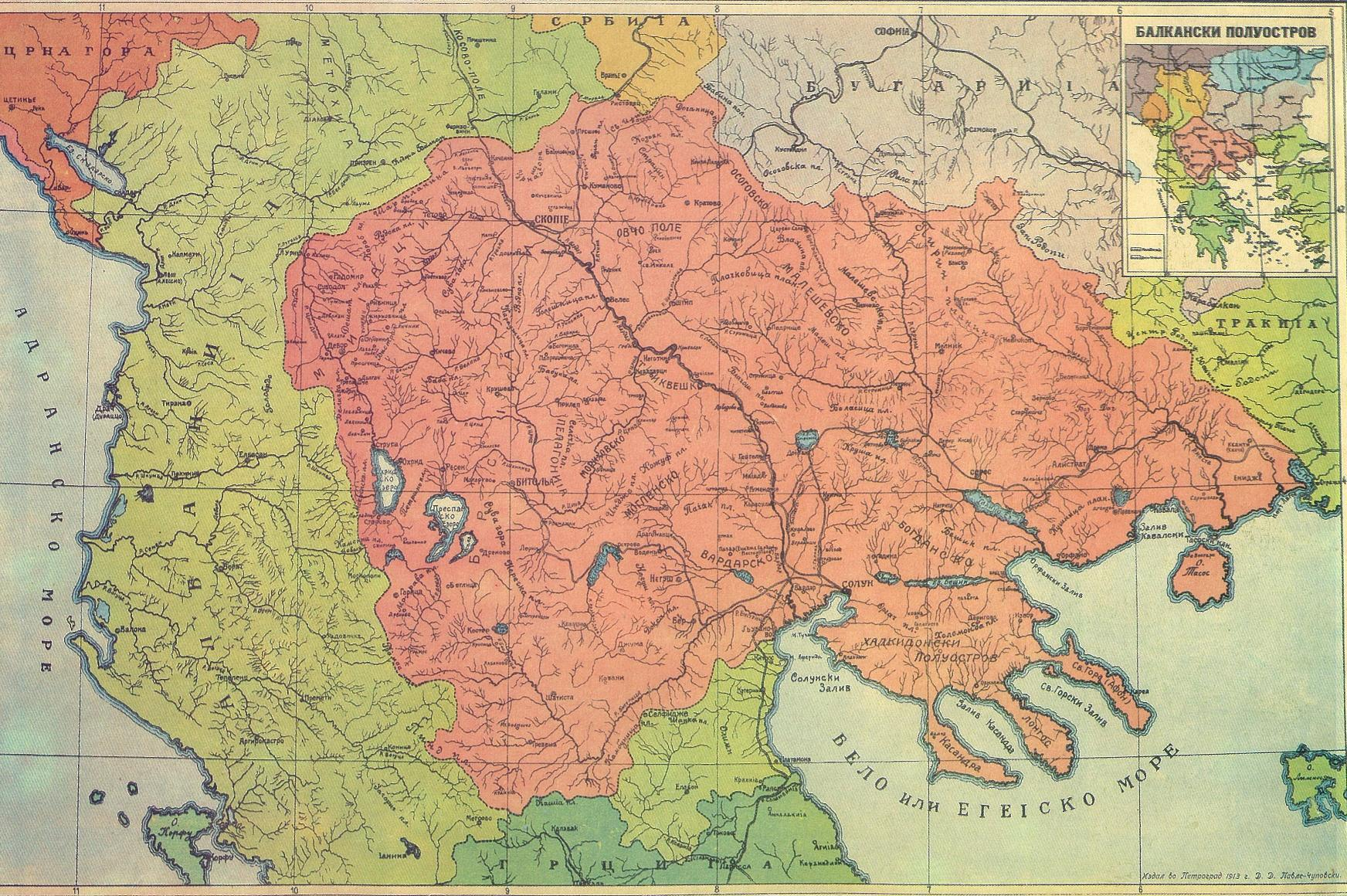
Map of Macedonia on the basis of earlier publication in the newspaper Macedonian Voice of the Saint Petersburg Macedonian Colony, 1913

During the Balkan Wars, former IMRO leaders of both the left and the right wings joined the Macedono-Odrinian Volunteers and fought with the Bulgarian Army. Others like Yane Sandanski with their bands assisted the Bulgarian army with its advance and still others penetrated as far as the region of Kastoria in the Villayet of Monastir. In the Second Balkan War, IMRO bands fought the Greeks and Serbs behind the front lines, but were subsequently routed and driven out. Notably, Petar Chaulev was one of the leaders of the Ohrid Uprising in 1913 organized jointly by IMRO and the Albanians of Western Macedonia.

The Balkan Wars resulted in important demographic changes to the European territories of the Ottoman Empire, especially after they were defeated and forced out of the region. What we may call 'Ottoman Macedonia' was divided between the Balkan nations, with its northern parts going to Serbian, the southern to Greece, and the northeastern to Bulgaria.

The wars were an important precursor to World War I, to the extent that Austria-Hungary took alarm at the great increase in Serbia's territory and regional status. This concern was shared by Germany, which saw Serbia as a satellite of Russia. Serbia's rise in power thus contributed to the two Central Powers' willingness to risk war following the assassination in Sarajevo of the Archduke Francis Ferdinand of Austria in June 1914.

=== World War I ===
The attack on the Balkans by the Central Powers was begun by Austria, who initially suffered setbacks by fierce Serbian resistance. It was not until Germany sent its troops that broke the resistance and allowed its allies, Austria-Hungary and Bulgaria to advance. Bulgaria occupied much of Macedonia, advancing into Greek Macedonia too, ever desirous of the area. The IMRO, led by Todor Aleksandrov, maintained its existence in Bulgaria, where it played a role in politics by playing upon Bulgarian irredentism and urging a renewed war to 'liberate' Macedonia. This was one factor in Bulgaria allying itself with Germany and Austria-Hungary in World War I. The IMRO organized the Valandovo action of 1915, which was an attack on a large Serbian force. In September 1915, the 11th Macedonian division in Bulgarian army was established with over 40 000 men — Bulgarian refugees from the Serbian army, volunteers etc. The Bulgarian army, supported by the organization's forces, was successful in the first stages of this conflict, managed to drive out the Serbian forces from Vardar Macedonia and came into positions on the line of the pre-war Greek-Serbian border, which was stabilized as a firm front until end of 1918.

In September 1918, the Serbs, British, French and Greeks broke through on the Macedonian front and Tsar Ferdinand was forced to sue for peace. Under the Treaty of Neuilly (November 1919), Bulgaria lost its Aegean coastline to Greece and nearly all of its Macedonian territory to the new state of Yugoslavia, and had to give Dobruja back to the Romanians (see also Western Outlands and Western Thrace).

=== Macedonians under Serbia ===
The territory of the present-day state of North Macedonia came under the direct rule of Serbia (and later the Kingdom of Yugoslavia), and was sometimes termed "southern Serbia", and, together with a large portion of today's southern Serbia, it belonged officially to the newly formed Vardar Banovina (district). An intense program of Serbianization was implemented during the 1920s and 1930s when Belgrade enforced a Serbian cultural assimilation process on the region. Between the world wars in Serbia, the dialects of Macedonia were treated as a Serbian dialects (UCLA Language Material Sources,). Only the literary Serbian language was taught, it was the language of government, education, media, and public life; even so local literature was tolerated as a local dialectal folkloristic form. The Serbian National Theatre in Skopje even performed some plays (now the classical drama pieces) in the local language.

Greece, like all other Balkan states, adopted restrictive policies towards its minorities, namely towards its Slavic population in its northern regions, due to its experiences with Bulgaria's wars, including the Second Balkan War, and the Bulgarian inclination of sections of its Slavic minority. Many of those inhabiting northeastern Greece fled to Bulgaria and very small group to Serbia (68 families) after the Balkan Wars or were exchanged with native Greeks from Bulgaria under a population exchange treaty in the 1920s. Greeks were resettled in the region in two occasions, firstly following the Bulgarian loss of the Second Balkan War when Bulgaria and Greece mutually exchanged their populations in 1919, and secondly in 1923 as a result of the population exchange with the new Turkish republic that followed the Greek military defeat in Asia minor. Thus, Greek Macedonia now came to be Greek dominant for the first time since the 7th century.

The Slavic speakers that stayed in northwestern Greece were regarded as a potentially disloyal minority and came under severe pressure, with restrictions on their movements, cultural activities and political rights. The chasing of macedonian Bulgarians after 1919 Many emigrated, for the most part to Canada, Australia, the United States, and other Eastern European countries like Bulgaria. The Greek names for some traditionally Slavic or Turkish speaking areas became official and the Slavic speakers were forced to change their Slavic surnames to Greek sounding surnames, e.g., Nachev becoming Natsulis. A similar procedure was applied to Greek names in Bulgaria and Serbia (e.g. Nevrokop becoming Goce Delchev). In Greece, there was a government sponsored process of Hellenization. Many of the border villages were closed to outsiders, ostensibly for security reasons. The Greek government and people have never recognized the existence of a distinct "Macedonian" ethnic group, as the term "Macedonian" is already reserved for the ethnic Greek population that has traditionally inhabited Greece's northern region (Greek Macedonia). According to Peter Trudgill Slavic speakers in northern Greece with a non-Greek national identity have tended or forced to leave Greece. As a result, the overwhelming majority of remaining Slavic speakers were forced and now declare themselves as Greeks

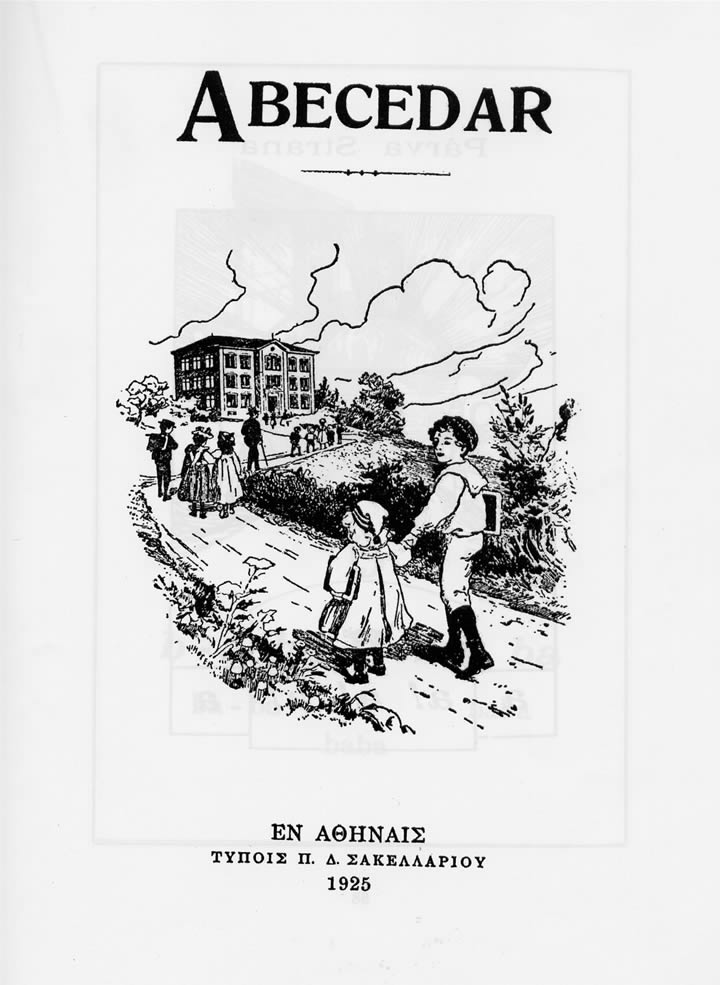
The cover page of the primer "ABECEDAR", prepared by a special government commissioner was published by the Greek government in Athens in 1925, intended for the Slavic-speaking minority children in Greek Macedonia to learn their native language in school.

On August 10, 1920, upon signing the Treaty of Sèvres that "measures were being taken towards the opening of schools with instruction in the Slavic language in the following school year of 1925/26". Thus, the primer intended for the "Slavic-speaking minority" children in Greek Macedonia to learn their native language in school, entitled "ABECEDAR" was offered as an argument in support of this statement. This primer, prepared by a special government commissioner was published by the Greek government in Athens in 1925, but was printed in a specially adapted Latin alphabet instead of the traditional Cyrillic, since Cyrillic was the official alphabet of the neighboring Bulgaria. Serbian language, on the other hand, uses both Cyrillic and Latin scripts. Nevertheless, the Abecedar schoolbooks were confiscated and destroyed before they got into the reach of the children.

In 1924 IMRO entered negotiations with the Comintern about collaboration between the communists and the Macedonian movement and the creation of a united Macedonian movement. The idea for a new unified organization was supported by the Soviet Union, which saw a chance for using this well developed revolutionary movement to spread revolution in the Balkans and destabilize the Balkan monarchies. Todor Alexandrov defended IMRO's independence and refused to concede on practically all points requested by the Communists. No agreement was reached besides a paper "Manifesto" (the so-called May Manifesto of 6 May 1924), in which the objectives of the unified Macedonian liberation movement were presented: independence and unification of partitioned Macedonia, fighting all the neighbouring Balkan monarchies, forming a Balkan Communist Federation and cooperation with the Soviet Union.

Failing to secure Alexandrov's cooperation, the Comintern decided to discredit him and published the contents of the Manifesto on 28 July 1924 in the "Balkan Federation" newspaper. IMRO's leaders Todor Aleksandrov and Aleksandar Protogerov promptly denied through the Bulgarian press that they've ever signed any agreements, claiming that the May Manifesto was a communist forgery.

The policy of assassinations was effective in making Serbian rule in Vardar Macedonia feel insecure but in turn provoked brutal reprisals on the local peasant population. Having lost a great deal of popular support in Vardar Macedonia due to his policies Ivan Mihailov, a new IMRO leader, favoured the internationalization of the Macedonian question.

He established close links with the Croatian Ustashe and with Italy. Numerous assassinations were carried out by IMRO agents in many countries, the majority in Yugoslavia. The most spectacular of these was the assassination of King Alexander I of Yugoslavia and the French Foreign Minister Louis Barthou in Marseille in 1934. in collaboration with the Croatian Ustaše. The killing was carried out by the IMRO terrorist Vlado Chernozemski and happened after the suppression of IMRO following the 19 May 1934 military coup in Bulgaria.

During the 1930s, the Comintern prepared a Resolution about the recognition of the Macedonian nation. It was accepted by the Political Secretariat in Moscow on January 11, 1934, and approved by the Executive Committee of the Comintern. The Resolution was published for first time in the April issue of Makedonsko Delo under the title ‘The Situation in Macedonia and the Tasks of IMRO (United)’.

=== World War II ===
Upon the outbreak of World War II, the government of the Kingdom of Bulgaria declared a position of neutrality, being determined to observe it until the end of the war, but hoping for bloodless territorial gains. But it was clear that the central geopolitical position of Bulgaria in the Balkans would inevitably lead to strong external pressure by both sides of World War II.

Bulgaria was forced to join the Axis powers in 1941, when German troops prepared to invade Greece from Romania reached the Bulgarian borders and demanded permission to pass through Bulgarian territory. Threatened by direct military confrontation, Tsar Boris III had no choice but to join the fascist block, which officially happened on 1 March 1941. There was little popular opposition, since the Soviet Union was in a non-aggression pact with Germany.

On April 6, 1941, despite having officially joined the Axis Powers, the Bulgarian government maintained a course of military passivity during the initial stages of the invasion of Yugoslavia and the Battle of Greece. As German, Italian, and Hungarian troops crushed Yugoslavia and Greece, the Bulgarians remained on the side-lines. The Yugoslav government surrendered on April 17. The Greek government was to hold out until April 30. On April 20, the period of Bulgarian passivity ended. The Bulgarian Army entered Nazi-occupied Greece. The goal was to gain an Aegean Sea outlet in Thrace and Eastern Macedonia and much of eastern Serbia. The so-called Vardar Banovina was divided between Bulgaria and Italians which occupied West Macedonia.

At the beginning of the war in the Balkans, Macedonia shows how complicated the situation was. The political sympathies were intertwined with the national feelings. As a rule, the pro-Serbian elements were for the English-French Allies and the pro-Bulgarian, for the Axis powers. Besides, some of the former revolutionary activists were not far from the thought of solving the Macedonian question through accession of Macedonia, or parts of it, to Italy. The followers of Ivan Mihailov fought for pro-Axis and pro-Bulgarian Macedonia. In this situation, the population was divided in different groups. And time was crucial.

Thus, on April 8, 1941, in Skopje a meeting was held, where the question: "What had to be done?" was put up. What actions should be undertaken in those crucial days in order not to omit, as it had already happened, the precise moment for liberating Macedonia. On that meeting were present mainly pro-Bulgarian followers of the idea for the liberation through independence of Macedonia, namely: Dimitar Gyuzelov, Dimitar Chkatrov, Toma Klenkov, Ivan Piperkov and other popular activists of IMRO as well as members of Yugoslav Communist Party (YCP) - Kotse Stojanov, Angel Petkovski and Ilja Neshovski, invited by Trajko Popov. The latter despite a communist, member of YCP, was an active follower of the idea of IMRO for the creation of a pro-Bulgarian, Macedonian state under German and Italian protection. But the situation changed dynamically.

Ten days later, when the Bulgarian army entered Yugoslav Vardar Macedonia on April 19, 1941, it was greeted by most of the population as liberators. Former IMRO members were active in organizing Bulgarian Action Committees charged with taking over the local authorities. Some former IMRO (United) members such as Metodi Shatorov, who were leading member of the Yugoslav Communist Party, also refused to define the Bulgarian forces as occupiers (contrary to instructions from Belgrade) and called for the incorporation of the local Macedonian Communist organizations within the Bulgarian Communist Party. This policy changed towards 1943 with the arrival of the Montenegrin Svetozar Vukmanović-Tempo, who began in earnest to organize armed resistance to the Bulgarian occupation. Many former IMRO members assisted the authorities in fighting Tempo's partisans.

IMRO was also active in organizing the resistance of the Bulgarian population in Aegean Macedonia against Greek nationalist and communist regiments. With the help of Mihailov and Macedonian emigrants in Sofia, several pro-German armed detachments - Uhrana were organized in the Kostur, Lerin and Voden districts of Greek Macedonia in 1943-44. These were led by Bulgarian officers originally from Aegean Macedonia - Andon Kalchev and Georgi Dimchev.

Local recruits and volunteers formed the Bulgarian 5th Army, based in Skopje, which was responsible for the round-up and deportation of over 7,000 Jews in Skopje and Bitola. Harsh rule by the occupying forces encouraged some Macedonians to support the Communist Partisan resistance movement of Josip Broz Tito. In Greece, it has been estimated that the military wing of the Communist Party of Greece (KKE), the Democratic Army of Greece (DSE) had 14,000 soldiers of Slavic Macedonian origin out of total 20,000 fighters. Some Macedonians which had been supporters of Communist partisan movement few in the Italian occupied area to Tito's Partisan resistance movement, fighting the occupying Bulgarians, Germans and Italians as well as opposing the Serbian royalist Chetniks. The Macedonian resistance at the end of the war had a strongly nationalist character, not at least as a reaction to Serbia's pre-war repression.

On 2 August 1944 in the St. Prohor Pčinjski monastery at the Antifascist Assembly of the National Liberation of Macedonia (ASNOM) with Panko Brashnarov (the former IMRO revolutionary from the Ilinden period and the IMRO United) as a first speaker, the modern Macedonian state was officially proclaimed, as a federal state within Tito's Yugoslavia, receiving recognition from the Allies.

On 5 September 1944, the Soviet Union declared war on Bulgaria and invaded the country. Within three days the Soviets occupied the northeastern part of Bulgaria along with the key port cities of Varna and Burgas. The Bulgarian Army was ordered to offer no resistance to the Soviets. On 8 September 1944, the Bulgarians changed sides and joined the Soviet Union in its war against Nazi Germany.

After the declaration of war by Bulgaria on Germany, Ivan Mihailov - the IMRO leader arrived in German-occupied Skopje, where the Germans hoped that he could form a Macedonian state with their support. Seeing that the war is lost to Germany and to avoid further bloodshed, he refused. The Bulgarian troops, surrounded by German forces and betrayed by high-ranking military commanders, fought their way back to the old borders of Bulgaria. Three Bulgarian armies (some 500,000 strong in total) entered Yugoslavia in September 1944 and moved from Sofia to Niš and Skopje with the strategic task of blocking the German forces withdrawing from Greece. Southern and eastern Serbia and Macedonia were liberated within a month.

=== Macedonians in Yugoslavia ===
The People's Republic of Macedonia was proclaimed at the first session of the ASNOM (on St. Elia's Day – August 2, 1944). The Macedonian language was proclaimed the official language of the Republic of Macedonia at the same day. The first document written in the literary standard Macedonian language is the first issue of the Nova Makedonia newspaper in autumn 1944. Later, by special Act, it became a constitutive part of the Federal Republic of Yugoslavia. For the next 50 years, the Republic of Macedonia was part of the Yugoslav federation.

Former members of the IMRO (United) which participated in the Communist Party of Yugoslavia, ASNOM and the forming of Republic of Macedonia as a federal state of Socialist Federal Republic of Yugoslavia as Panko Brashnarov, Pavel Shatev, Dimitar Vlahov and Venko Markovski were quickly ousted from the new government. Such Macedonian activists came from Bulgarian Communist Party, have declared Bulgarian ethnicity before World War II never managed to get rid of their pro-Bulgarian bias and because of that, the first and second one were annihilated. As last survivor among the communists associated with the idea of Macedonian autonomy, Dimitar Vlahov was used "solely for window dressing". They ware chanched (sic) from cadres loyal to the Yugoslav Communist Party in Belgrade, who had pro-Serbian leanings and education before the war. It was not important that these party members have declared Bulgarian origin during the war, as for example Kiro Gligorov, Mihajlo Apostoloski and Lazar Koliševski.

Following the war, Tito separated Yugoslav Macedonia from Serbia, making it a republic of the new federal Yugoslavia (as the Socialist Republic of Macedonia) in 1946. He also promoted the concept of a separate Macedonian nation, as a means of severing the ties of the Slavic population of Yugoslav Macedonia with Bulgaria, although the Macedonian language is close to and largely mutually intelligible with Bulgarian, and to a lesser extent Serbian. The differences were emphasized and the region's historical figures were promoted as being uniquely Macedonian (rather than Bulgarian or Serbian). A separate Macedonian Orthodox Church was established, splitting off from the Serbian Orthodox Church in 1967 (only partly successfully, because the church has not been recognized by any other Orthodox Church). The ideologists of a separate and independent Macedonian country, same as the pro-Bulgarian sentiment, was forcibly suppressed.

Tito had a number of reasons for doing this. First, he wanted to reduce Serbia's dominance in Yugoslavia; establishing a territory formerly considered Serbian as an equal to Serbia within Yugoslavia achieved this effect. Secondly, he wanted to sever the ties of the Macedonian population with Bulgaria as recognition of that population as Bulgarian could have undermined the unity of the Yugoslav federation. Thirdly, Tito sought to justify future Yugoslav claims towards the rest of geographical Macedonia; in August 1944, he claimed that his goal was to reunify "all parts of Macedonia, divided in 1915 and 1918 by Balkan imperialists." To this end, he opened negotiations with Bulgaria for a new federal communist state (see Bled agreement), which would also probably have included Albania, and supported the Greek Communists in the Greek Civil War. The idea of reunification of all of Macedonia under Communist rule was abandoned in 1948 when the Greek Communists lost the civil war and Tito fell out with the Soviet Union and pro-Soviet Bulgaria.

Tito's actions had a number of important consequences for the Macedonians. The most important was, obviously, the promotion of a distinctive Macedonian identity as a part of the multi-ethnic society of Yugoslavia. The process of ethnogenesis, started earlier, gained momentum, and a distinct national Macedonian identity was formed. Revisionist historian Zoran Todorovski estimated the number of victims during the era as 50,000, including those killed, imprisoned, deported, subject to forced labor, torture, etc.

The critics of these claims question the number as it would imply roughly a third of the male Christian population at that time. And the reasons of imprisonment, they argue, were multiple as there were Macedonian nationalists, Stalinists, Middle class members, Albanian nationalists and everybody else who was either against the post war regime or denounced as one for whatever reasons. Unlike the time before World War II, when Macedonia was hotbed for unrest and terror and about 60% of the entire royal Yugoslav police force was stationed there, after the war there were no signs of disturbances comparable with pre-war times or post war times in other parts of former Yugoslavia, such as Croatia, Bosnia and Serbia. Whatever the truth, it was certainly the case that most Macedonians embraced their official recognition as a separate nationality. Even so, some pro-Bulgarian or pro-Serbian sentiment even among members of the Communist Party persisted despite government suppression; even as late as 1991, convictions were still being handed down for pro-Bulgarian statements. Some of them even created pro-Bulgarian literary works. Local Albanian intellectuals in the area also support the local Slavic inhabitants with Pro-Bulgarian sentiments, for which they have also been repressed. Bulgarians from other parts of Yugoslavia also support Bulgaria's position on the Macedonian question.

After World War II, ethnic Macedonians living in Greece organized themselves in Narodno Osloboditelen Front (NOF) in 1945, and started fighting against the right-wing government in Athens. In 1946, NOF agreed to unite with the Democratic Army of Greece and start a join fight (see: Greek Civil War). Many of the Slavic speaking Macedonians who lived in Greece either chose to emigrate to Communist countries (especially Yugoslavia) to avoid prosecution for fighting on the side of the Greek communists. Although there was some liberalization between 1959 and 1967, the Greek military dictatorship re-imposed harsh restrictions. The situation gradually eased after Greece's return to democracy, but Greece still receives criticism for its treatment of some Slavic-speaking Macedonian political organizations. Greece, however, recognizes the Rainbow political party of the Slavic-speaking Macedonians who canvas during elections.

The Macedonians in Albania faced restrictions under the Stalinist dictatorship of Enver Hoxha, though ordinary Albanians were little better off. Their existence as a separate minority group was recognized as early as 1945 and a degree of cultural expression was permitted.

As ethnographers and linguists tended to identify the population of the Bulgarian part of Macedonia as Bulgarian in the interwar period, the issue of a Macedonian minority in the country came up as late as the 1940s. In 1946, the population of Blagoevgrad Province was declared Macedonian and teachers were brought in from Yugoslavia to teach the Macedonian language. The census of 1946 was accompanied by mass repressions, the result of which was the complete destruction of the local organizations of the Internal Macedonian Revolutionary Organization and mass internments of people at the Belene concentration camp. The policy was reverted at the end of the 1950s and later Bulgarian governments argued that the two censuses of 1946 and 1956 which recorded up to 187,789 Macedonians (of whom over 95% were said to live in Blagoevgrad Province, also called Pirin Macedonia) were the result of pressure from Moscow. Western governments, however, continued to list the population of Blagoevgrad Province as Macedonian until the beginning of the 1990s despite the 1965 census which put Macedonians in the country at 9,630. The two latest censuses after the fall of Communism (in 1992 and 2001) have, however, confirmed the results from previous censuses with some 3,000 people declaring themselves as "Macedonians" in Blagoevgrad Province in 2001 (<1.0% of the population of the region) out of 5,000 in the whole of Bulgaria.

=== Macedonians after Independence ===
The country of North Macedonia officially celebrates 8 September 1991 as Independence day, with regard to the referendum endorsing independence from Yugoslavia, albeit legalizing participation in "future union of the former states of Yugoslavia". The Republic of Macedonia remained at peace through the Yugoslav wars of the early 1990s. A few very minor changes to its border with Yugoslavia were agreed upon to resolve problems with the demarcation line between the two countries. However, it was seriously destabilized by the Kosovo War in 1999, when an estimated 360,000 ethnic Albanian refugees from Kosovo took refuge in the country. Although they departed shortly after the war, soon after, Albanian radicals on both sides of the border took up arms in pursuit of autonomy or independence for the Albanian-populated areas of the Republic. A short conflict was fought between government and ethnic Albanian rebels, mostly in the north and west of the country, between March and June 2001. This war ended with the intervention of a NATO ceasefire monitoring force. In the Ohrid Agreement, the government agreed to devolve greater political power and cultural recognition to the Albanian minority.

In this period, it has been claimed by Macedonian scholars that there exist large and oppressed ethnic Macedonian minorities in the region of Macedonia, located in neighboring Albania (up to 5,000 people), Bulgaria (up to 20,000, mainly in Blagoevgrad Province), Greece and Serbia (about 20,000 in Pčinja District). Because of those claims, irredentist proposals are being made calling for the expansion of the borders of the Republic of Macedonia to encompass the territories allegedly populated with ethnic Macedonians, either directly or through initial independence of Blagoevgrad province and Greek Macedonia, followed by their incorporation into a single state; the population of the neighboring regions is presented as "subdued" to the propaganda of the governments of those neighbouring countries, and in need of "liberation".

The supporters of Macedonism generally ignore censuses conducted in Albania, Bulgaria and Greece, which show minimal presence of ethnic Macedonians. They consider those censuses flawed, without presenting evidence in support, and accuse the governments of neighboring countries of continued propaganda. During this period, ethnic Macedonians living in the region continue to complain of official harassment. This was confirmed in 2005 by the European Court of Human Rights with a judgment whereby Bulgaria was sentenced to pay damages amounting to 6,800 euros for a violation of Article 11 (freedom of assembly and association) of the European Convention on Human Rights for its refusal to give court registration to "UMO Ilinden-Pirin", the Macedonian political party in Bulgaria. A similar judgment was passed against Greece for also violating Article 11 in regards of the members of the Greek Rainbow party.

== See also ==
- Demographic history of Macedonia
- A list of prominent ethnic Macedonians
- Macedonian nationalism
- Political views on the Macedonian language
- Macedonian Bulgarians
