= Mikulčić =

Mikulčić and Mikuličić are South Slavic patronymic surnames derived from the given name Mikula. Notable people with the sutnames include:

- Ema Mikulčić (born 1992), Croatian tennis player
- Ivan Mikulčić (1936–2020), Macedonian archaeologist
- Siniša Mikuličić (born 1983), Croatian sports sailor
