= Mauros =

Bulgar leader

- Allegiance: Kuber; Byzantine Empire
- Service years: 680s, 710s (documented)
- Rank: patrikios and archon of the Sermisianoi and the Bulgars
- Conflicts: Siege of Chersonesos (711)

Mauros (Bulgarian: Мавър; Greek: Μαύρος, "black, dark") (fl. 686–711) was a Bulgar leader, one of the chief subordinates and closest supporters of Kuber, a 7th-century Bulgar ruler in Macedonia. After orchestrating a foiled attempt to capture Thessaloniki for Kuber, Mauros remained in the city and joined the ranks of the Byzantine aristocracy. He was bestowed the noble title of patrikios and was deeply involved in the power struggle between Justinian II and Philippikos Bardanes in the beginning of the 8th century. Mauros is the earliest attested leader, styled archon, to be placed by the Byzantine government in charge of a dependent people, in this case the Bulgars and Sermesianoi who had fled to Byzantium.

== Bulgar plot to capture Thessaloniki ==
Mauros first appears in the sources in relation to Kuber's plot to conquer Thessaloniki in c. 686–687. From the testaments of contemporaneous historians, it is apparent that Mauros was a well-respected figure among the population ruled by Kuber, which consisted of Bulgars and Sermesianoi (Byzantine refugees from Sirmium on the Sava) who had settled in Macedonia. Bulgarian historian Plamen Pavlov conjectures that Mauros may have been the kavhan (first minister) or ichirgu-boil (general of the highest rank) of Kuber. Regardless of whether he had an official title at all, Mauros was certainly among Kuber's most trusted associates. Prior to his mission in Byzantium, Mauros was polygamous and a heathen.

Due to the increasing flight of Kuber's Byzantine subjects to Thessaloniki, he and Mauros hatched a plan to seize the city and use it as a base for future expansion. Mauros was seen as the ideal candidate to carry out the mission not only due to Kuber's trust in him, but also because Mauros was fluent in Slavic and Greek. In line with the plan, Mauros was sent by Kuber to Thessaloniki pretending to be a refugee in charge of a group of people fleeing from Kuber. Mauros was not only welcomed inside the city, but also put in charge of all Bulgar and Sermesianoi refugees and given the title of hypatos by Byzantine Emperor Justinian II (r. 685–695, 705–711). Mauros appears to have commanded his own military force, consisting of former subjects of Kuber who were nominally part of the Byzantine army. While many of Thessaloniki's notables were suspicious of Mauros, his significant power enabled him to effectively deal with anyone who was close to uncovering his plot.

Mauros intended to organize an uprising in Thessaloniki on Easter Saturday, the night before Easter, relying on the lack of preparedness among the city's defenders. However, his plan had perhaps been revealed to the Byzantines: the Byzantine navy and its chief admiral Sisinnios arrived in the city, preventing Mauros from undertaking any military activity. When the navy anchored in Thessaloniki, Mauros appeared to fall ill and spent a long time in bed under the surveillance of Sisinnios. While the allegations against Mauros were never proven, he was nonetheless dispatched outside the city along with Sisinnios's men, hoping to attract new refugees from Kuber and the local Slavs.

== Byzantine patrikios ==
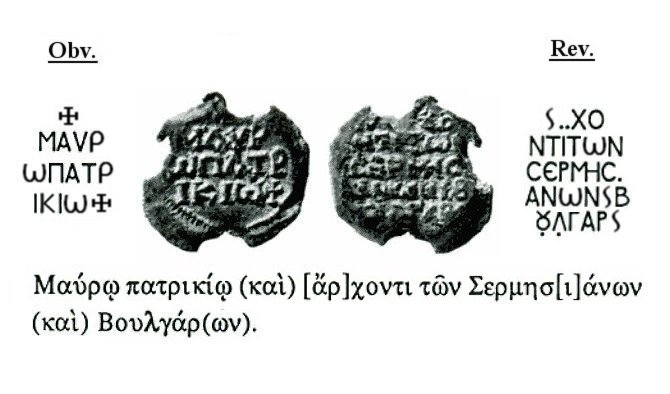
Seal of Mauros, one of Kuber's chief associates, from 684 to 685 AD. The inscription says: "Of Mauros, patrikios and archon of the Sermesianoi and Bulgaroi".

Though Mauros did not sever his ties with Kuber, at the same time he continued his rise in the Byzantine hierarchy. Three preserved seals, the earliest from the late 7th century, testify to Mauros's elevation to the status of "patrikios and archon of the Sermesianoi and the Bulgaroi". In fact, Mauros appears to have been the first attested case in a long Byzantine tradition of granting rulers of unassimilated but pro-imperial populations the title of archon. Some researchers assert the identification of Kuber's associate with Mauros of the seals; others do not exclude the possibility that the Mauros of the seals was the former's son. Historian Daniel Ziemann even suggests that Mauros the Bulgar may or may not be a different person from Mauros the patrikios.

Even as a member of the Byzantine nobility, Mauros made one more attempt to assist Kuber in an anti-Byzantine plot, this time threatening the life of the emperor. However, he was once again unsuccessful. The conspiracy was uncovered by his own son from a Byzantine woman, Mauros was imprisoned in a Constantinople suburb and stripped of his noble titles.

Despite this episode, the next reference to Mauros describes him once again as a patrikios in service of Justinian towards the end of that emperor's second reign in 705–711. In 711, he was involved in Justinian's attempt to quell a rebellion in Chersonesos, the main Byzantine city in Crimea. Mauros and another patrikios, Stephen, were dispatched to Chersonesos supported by the navy, where on the orders of the emperor they installed the spatharios Elias as governor. Even though their arrival was met with no apparent resistance, it was supervened by repressions and the torture of local leaders.

On the way back from Chersonesos, the navy was hit by a horrible storm which claimed thousands of victims, but Mauros survived. Not long after the first expedition, he had to return to Chersonesos because sedition in the city had begun anew, and the newly installed Elias had joined the insurgents. Prior to Mauros's arrival, a naval expedition had failed to crush the uprising and its leaders had been murdered. Assessing the size of the rebellion, Justinian dispatched Mauros in charge of a large force complete with siege engines. Mauros had some success with the siege of the city early on, but the arrival of Khazar support for the insurgents caused Mauros to abandon Justinian and he too joined the ranks of his opponents, led by Philippikos Bardanes.

Justinian apparently sought to intercept the ships of the insurgents at Sinope, on the Black Sea coast of Asia Minor, since he moved to that city. However, he arrived only to see the rebel navy pass Sinope en route to the capital Constantinople, where Philippikos (r. 711–713) was proclaimed emperor. As a close ally of the new ruler, Mauros was tasked with the arrest of Justinian's son Tiberios who had sought refuge inside the Church of St Mary of Blachernae. Mauros and Ioannes, another associate of Philippikos, seized him and Tiberios was promptly executed. This is the last mention of Mauros in the sources, and his subsequent fate is unknown.

== Sources ==
- Cameron, Averil (2003). Fifty years of prosopography: the later Roman Empire, Byzantium and beyond. Oxford University Press. ISBN 978-0-19-726292-4.
- Curta, Florin (2006). Southeastern Europe in the Middle Ages, 500–1250. Cambridge University Press. ISBN 978-0-521-81539-0.
- Saint Nicephorus (1990). Cyril A. Mango (ed.). Short history. Dumbarton Oaks. ISBN 978-0-88402-184-1.
- Oikonomidès, Nicolas (1986). A collection of dated Byzantine lead seals. Dumbarton Oaks. ISBN 978-0-88402-150-6.
- Theophanes the Confessor (1982). Harry Turtledove (ed.). The chronicle of Theophanes: an English translation of anni mundi 6095-6305 (A.D. 602–813). University of Pennsylvania Press. ISBN 978-0-8122-1128-3.
- Ziemann, Daniel (2007). Vom Wandervolk zur Grossmacht: die Entstehung Bulgariens im frühen Mittelalter (7.–9. Jahrhundert) [From Nomads to Great Power: The Emergence of Bulgaria in the Early Middle Ages (7th–9th Century)] (in German). Böhlau Verlag Köln Weimar. ISBN 978-3-412-09106-4.
- Андреев, Йордан; Лазаров, Иван; Павлов, Пламен (1999). Кой кой е в средновековна България [Who is Who in Medieval Bulgaria] (in Bulgarian). Петър Берон. ISBN 978-954-402-047-7.
- Бакалов, Георги (2007). История на българите: Военна история на българите от древността до наши дни [History of the Bulgarians: Military History of the Bulgarians from Antiquity to Modern Times] (in Bulgarian). София: Труд. ISBN 978-954-621-235-1.
- Бешевлиев, Веселин (1981). Прабългарски епиграфски паметници [Bulgar Epigraphic Records] (in Bulgarian). София: Издателство на Отечествения фронт. OCLC 8554080.
- Петров, Петър (1981). Образуване на българската държава [Formation of the Bulgarian State] (in Bulgarian). София: Наука и изкуство. OCLC 252433946.
