= Micula (disambiguation) =

Micula is a commune in Romania.

Micula may also refer to:

- Micula (surname)
- Micula River, an alternate name for the Egherul Mare River
