= Sermesianoi =

The Sermesianoi or, alternatively, Keramisians were a group of 70,000 Bulgars, Pannonian Avars and Byzantine Christians from Syrmia. They fled in Byzantine region of Macedonia, following a successful revolt against the Avar Khaganate led by the Bulgar noble Kuber, around the year 680.

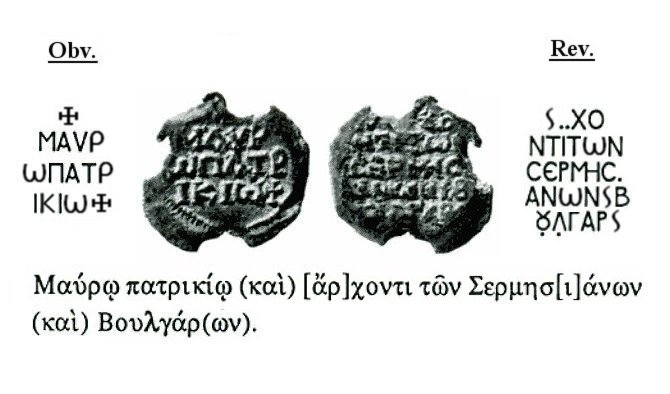
Seal of Mauros, one of Kuber's chief associates, from 684 to 685 AD. The inscription says: "Of Mauros, patrikios and archon of the Sermesianoi and Bulgaroi".

== In Avar Pannonia ==
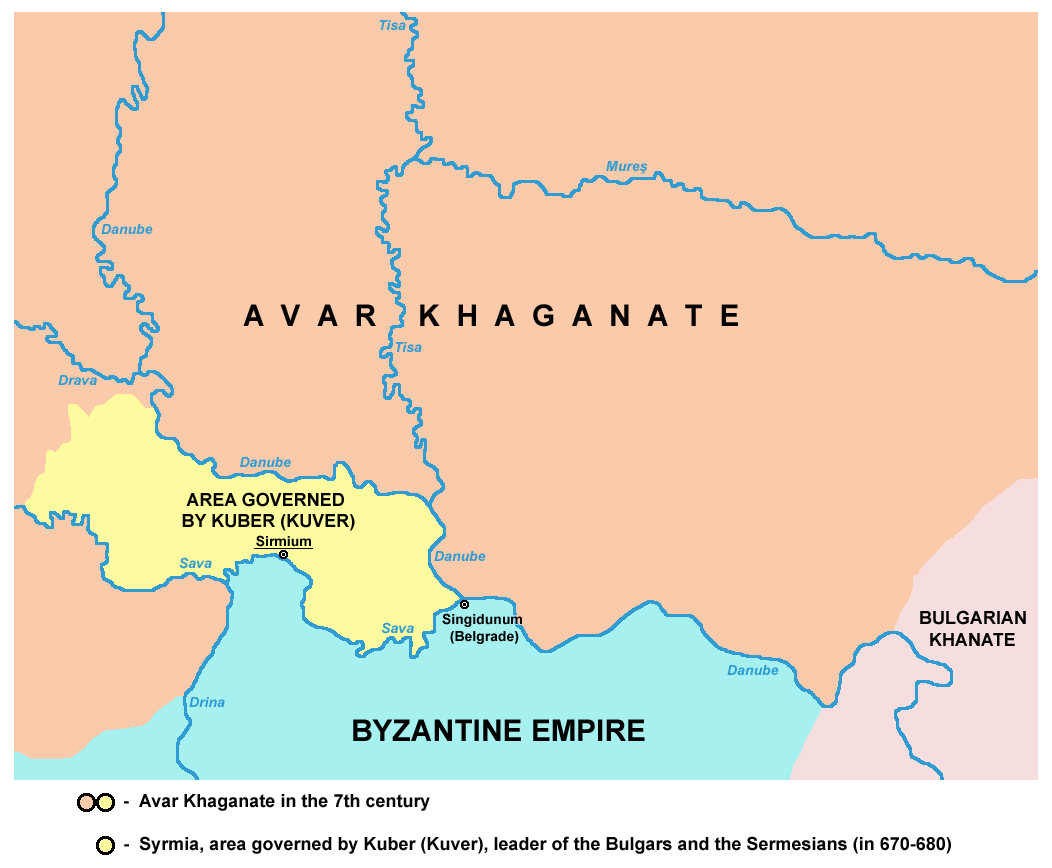
Syrmia, the region governed by Kuber in the Avar Khaganate

The Sermesianoi were a mixed population, which included the descendants of Roman (Byzantine) Christians, whom the Avars had captured in the Balkan Peninsula and settled in the region of Sirmium. Kuber had been made governor of the region by the Avar Khagan. Kuber's subjects called themselves Sermesianoi, but the Byzantines referred to them as "Bulgars". They had preserved their Roman and Christian traditions, even though their ancestors had been taken to the Avar Khaganate some 60 years prior to Kuber's appointment.

As the Sermesianoi never stopped dreaming of returning to their ancestors' homes, Kuber rose up in open rebellion against the Khagan. According to modern historians, Kuber's rebellion occurred in the 670s or early 680s. Around 70,000 Sermesianoi joined him and departed for the Byzantine Empire. The Khagan attempted to hinder their migration, but they routed the Avars in five or six battles and crossed the Danube.

== In Byzantine Macedonia ==
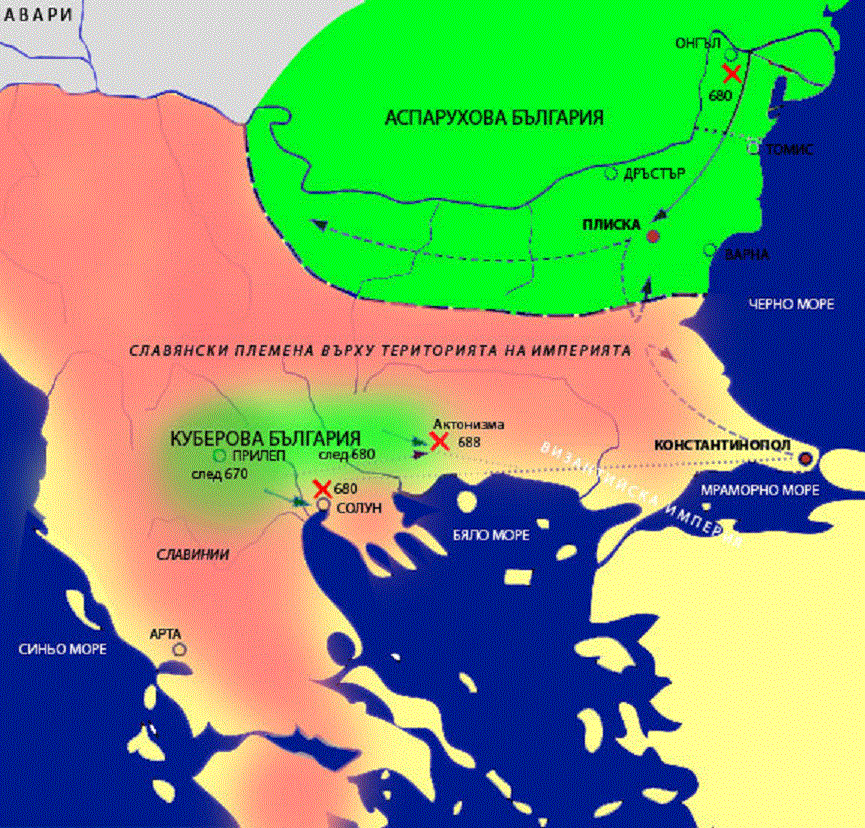
Bulgaria of Kuber

Kuber and the Sermesianoi went as far as south as the plain of Thessaloniki, where they settled, asking for the permission of the Byzantine emperor. The emperor gave his consent and ordered the nearby Slavic tribe of the Dragovites to supply Kuber and his people with food. Kuber and his associate Mauros subsequently attempted to seize Thessaloniki, taking advantage of a civil war in the city but were unsuccessful.

Kuber and those Sermesianoi who had not returned to their ancestral homes ultimately settled in the Keramisian field, most likely the Pelagonia plain in North Macedonia, hence their other name, "Keramisians" (most likely a corruption of Sermesianoi). Macedonian archaeologist Ivan Mikulčić localizes the settlement of the Sermesianoi to modern western North Macedonia and eastern Albania and attributes the treasures found at Vrap and Ersekë (the Avar Treasure) to Kuber's people. German archeologist Joachim Werner has also linked the Vrap Treasure to Kuber and the Sermesianoi. According to Werner, the treasure may have been part of the Khagan's treasury, which was robbed by Kuber and then carried south of the Danube.

== See also ==
- Kuber
- Mauros
- Avar Treasure

== Sources ==
- Curta, Florin (2006). Southeastern Europe in the Middle Ages, 500–1250. Cambridge: Cambridge University Press.
- Curta, Florin (2001). The Making of the Slavs: History and Archaeology of the Lower Danube Region, c. 500–700. Cambridge: Cambridge University Press. ISBN 9781139428880.
- Fine, John V. A. Jr. (1991) [1983]. The Early Medieval Balkans: A Critical Survey from the Sixth to the Late Twelfth Century. Ann Arbor: University of Michigan Press. ISBN 0-472-08149-7.
- Hupchik, Dennis P (2002). The Balkans. From Constantinople to Communism. Palgrave MacMillans. ISBN 1-4039-6417-3.
- Микулчиќ, Иван (1996). Средновековни градови и тврдини во Македонија [Medieval towns and castles in the Republic of Macedonia]. Makedonska akademija na naukite i umetnostite. ISBN 9989-649-08-1.
- Szádeczky-Kardoss, Samuel (1990). "The Avars". In Sinor, Denis (ed.). The Cambridge History of Early Inner Asia (Volume I. Cambridge University Press. pp. 206–228. ISBN 0-521-24304-1.
