= Kuber =

7th-century Bulgar leader

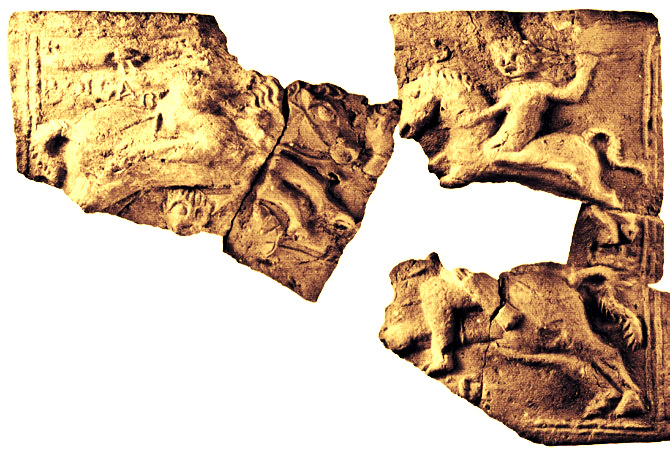

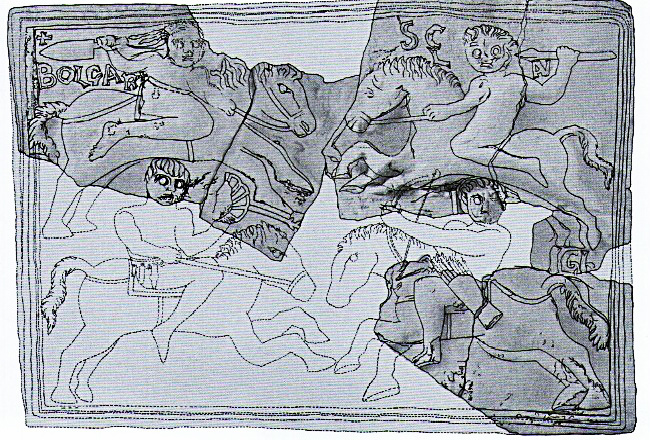
Terracotta tile with the Latin inscription "BOLGAR" and "SCLAVIGI" found in Vinica, North Macedonia, which according to some interpretations depicts a battle scene from the late 7th century between Kuber's Bulgars and Slavs.

Kuber (also Kouber or Kuver) was a Bulgar leader who, according to the Miracles of Saint Demetrius, liberated a mixed Bulgar and Byzantine Christian population in the 670s, whose ancestors had been transferred from the Eastern Roman Empire to the Syrmia region in Pannonia by the Avars 60 years earlier. According to a scholarly theory, he was a son of Kubrat, brother of Khan Asparukh and member of the Dulo clan.

== Origins ==
According to the Byzantine scholar, Theophanes the Confessor, Kubrat's (unnamed) fourth son, who left the Pontic steppes after his father's death around 642, became "the subject of the [Khagan] of the Avars in Avar Pannonia and remained there with his army". According to a scholarly theory, first proposed by the Bulgarian historian Vasil Zlatarski, Kuber was the fourth son of Kubrat, the Christian ruler of the Onogur Bulgars in the steppes north of the Black Sea. Kuber's story is continued in the second book of the Miracles of Saint Demetrius. The book is a hagiographic work, written in Thessaloniki in the 680s or 690s. Denis Sinor wrote "The Avar Kaghan entrusted Kuber and his suite with the governing of the descendants of the Christian Byzantine prisoners of war, carried off sixty years ago, who were living mixed with Avars and Bulgars north of the Danube, not far from the former province of Pannonia Sirmiensis." Nevertheless, Kuber's people soon liberated the POWs and led them south to the region of modern North Macedonia. The American historian John Van Antwerp Fine, Jr. writes that, if Zlatarski's theory is correct, Kuber was named for his father, because Kuber and Kubrat are most probably two Greek versions of the same Bulgar name. However, others suggest Kuber is but a reference to Asparukh's own Kubiar branch of Kubrat's Dulo clan where "Kubi-ar" may mean "fair haired". Finally, Croatian researchers have proposed that Kubrat of Onoguria's five sons correspond to the five brothers from White Croatia who took Avaria in 677, whereby Kuber would be Chrobatos (Χρωβάτος).

== In Avar Pannonia ==
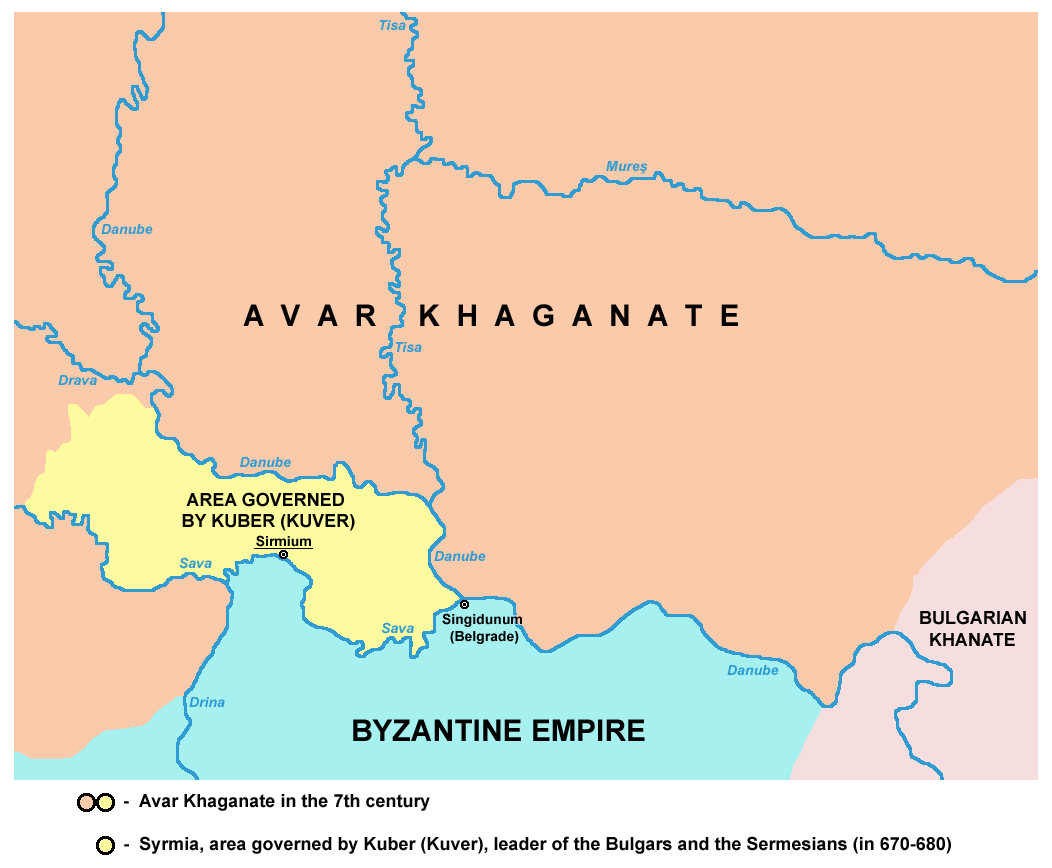
Syrmia, the region governed by Kuber in the Avar Khaganate

Kuber was the ruler of a mixed population in the Avar Khaganate, including the descendants of the prisoners of war whom the Avars had captured in the Balkan Peninsula and settled around Sirmium. He was made governor by the khagan. Historian Samuel Szádeczky-Kardoss – who accepts Kuber's identification as Kubrat's son and thus a scion of the royal Dulo clan – writes that Kuber became governor of that region, because the Khagan wanted to separate him from his Bulgar subjects who had followed him from the Pontic steppes. Kuber's subjects called themselves Sermesianoi, but the Byzantines regarded them as "Bulgars". They preserved their Christian traditions, although their ancestors had been taken to the Avar Khaganate about 60 years before Kuber's appointment.

The Sermesianoi did not cease to dream of their return to their ancestors' homes. Taking advantage of his subjects' feelings, Kuber rose up in open rebellion against the Khagan "in our times", according to the Miracles of Saint Demetrius. Modern historians say that Kuber's rebellion occurred in the 670s or early 680s. Around 70,000 Sermesianoi joined him and departed for the Byzantine Empire. The khagan attempted to hinder their migration, but they routed the Avars in five or six battles and crossed the river Danube.

== In Byzantine Macedonia ==
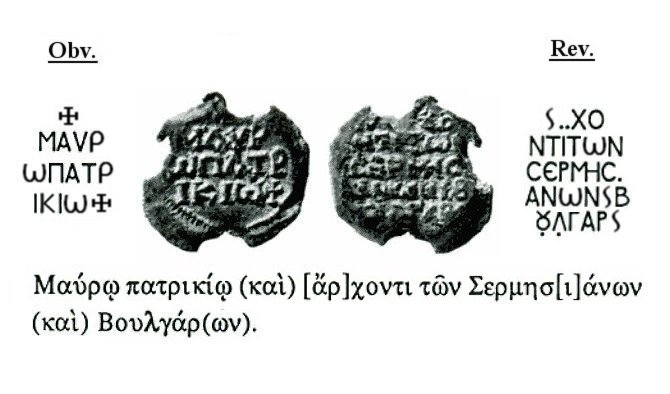
Seal of Mauros, one of Kuber's chief associates, from 684–685 AD. The inscription says: "Of Mauros, patrikios and archon of the Sermesianoi and Bulgaroi".

Kuber and his people moved as far as the region of Thessaloniki. He decided to settle together with the Sermesianoi in a plain and sent his envoy to the Byzantine Emperor, whom the Miracles of Saint Demetrios did not name, to request his permission. The emperor gave his consent and ordered the nearby Slavic tribe of the Dragovites to supply Kuber and his people with food. However, Kuber's people still wanted to go back to their ancestral homes and started to disperse. Fearing of the decline of his power base, Kuber asked the emperor to forbid the Sermesianoi to leave the plain and to confirm Kuber's position as their ruler. His request seems to have been rejected, because he attempted to seize Thessaloniki, taking advantage of a civil war in the city. However, Saint Demetrius unmasked Kuber's agents who tried to open the gates of Thessaloniki, hindering him from entering the city, according to the saint's hagiography.

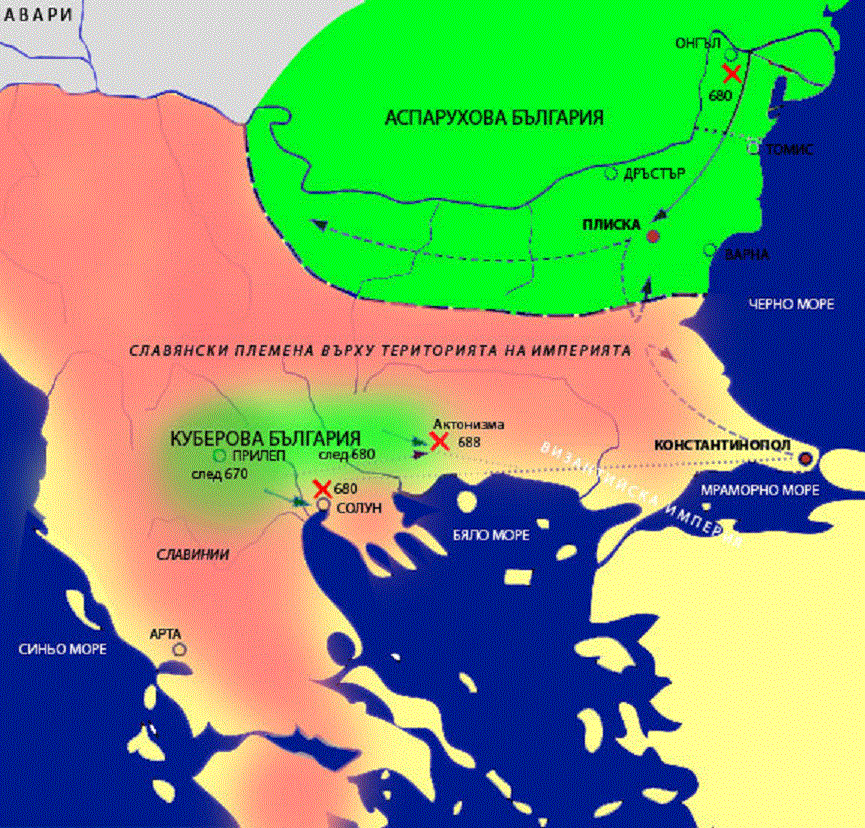
Bulgaria of Kuber according to Bulgarian historiography.

There is no more information about Kuber's life in the Miracles. However, he is linked to the ambush and defeat of Byzantine Emperor Justinian II at the hands of the Bulgars in 689, on his return to Constantinople from a campaign "to subjugate the Bulgars and the Sclavinians" around Thessaloniki. According to Veselin Beshevliev, based on an inscription on the Madara Rider, Kuber may have also had help from Khan Asparukh's son, Tervel, who is said to have cooperated against Justinian II with his "uncles in the region of Thessaloniki". Walter Pohl rejected this theory, arguing that it is highly doubtful, since it relied on circular reasoning and contradicts other historical evidence. Eventually, Kuber's attempted "statelet" proved ephemeral, and his Bulgars are assumed to have quickly been assimilated by the surrounding Slavs. Other historians reject the theory.

The Macedonian archaeologist Ivan Mikulčić attributes the treasures found at Vrap and Ersekë to Kuber's people, thus argues that Kuber's Bulgars moved to those areas after the failed attempt to capture Thessaloniki.

== Honour ==
Kuber Peak in Tangra Mountains on Livingston Island in the South Shetland Islands, Antarctica is named after Kuber.

== See also ==
- Sermesianoi

== Sources ==
=== Primary sources ===
- The Chronicle of Theophanes Confessor: Byzantine and Near Eastern History, AD 284–813 (Translated with Introduction and Commentary by Cyril Mango and Roger Scott with the assistance of Geoffrey Greatrex) (2006). Oxford University Press. ISBN 978-0-19-822568-3.

=== Secondary sources ===
- Curta, Florin (2001). The Making of the Slavs: History and Archaeology of the Lower Danube Region, c. 500–700. Cambridge: Cambridge University Press. ISBN 9781139428880.
- Curta, Florin (2006). Southeastern Europe in the Middle Ages, 500–1250. Cambridge: Cambridge University Press.
- Fine, John V. A. Jr. (1991) [1983]. The Early Medieval Balkans: A Critical Survey from the Sixth to the Late Twelfth Century. Ann Arbor: University of Michigan Press. ISBN 0-472-08149-7.
- Gluhak, Alemko (1990), Porijeklo imena Hrvat [Origin of the name Croat] (in Croatian), Zagreb, Čakovec: Alemko Gluhak
- Heršak, Emil; Nikšić, Boris (2007), "Hrvatska etnogeneza: pregled komponentnih etapa i interpretacija (s naglaskom na euroazijske/nomadske sadržaje)" [Croatian Ethnogenesis: A Review of Component Stages and Interpretations (with Emphasis on Eurasian/Nomadic Elements)], Migration and Ethnic Themes (in Croatian), 23 (3)
- Hupchik, Dennis P (2002). The Balkans. From Constantinople to Communism. Palgrave MacMillans. ISBN 1-4039-6417-3.
- Микулчиќ, Иван (1996). Средновековни градови и тврдини во Македонија [Medieval towns and castles in the Republic of Macedonia]. Makedonska akademija na naukite i umetnostite. ISBN 9989-649-08-1.
- Ostrogorsky, George (1968). History of the Byzantine State. Oxford: Oxford: Basil Blackwell. ISBN 9780631110705.
- Szymański, Wojciech; Dąbrowska, Elżbieta (1979). Awarzy. Węgrzy [Avars. Hungarians]. Ossolineum. ISBN 83-04-00246-9.
- Szádeczky-Kardoss, Samuel (1990). "The Avars". In Sinor, Denis (ed.). The Cambridge History of Early Inner Asia (Volume I. Cambridge University Press. pp. 206–228. ISBN 0-521-24304-1.
- Živković, Tibor (2012). De conversione Croatorum et Serborum: A Lost Source. Belgrade: The Institute of History.
