= Calyptrosciadium =

Scientific classification
- Kingdom: Plantae
- Clade: Tracheophytes
- Clade: Angiosperms
- Clade: Eudicots
- Clade: Asterids
- Order: Apiales
- Family: Apiaceae
- Subfamily: Apioideae
- Tribe: Komarovieae
- Genus: Calyptrosciadium; Rech.f. & Kuber

Genus of flowering plants

Calyptrosciadium is a genus of flowering plant in the family Apiaceae. It is native to Iran and Afghanistan.

== Species ==
As of January 2023, Plants of the World Online accepted two species:

- Calyptrosciadium bungei (Boiss.) Pimenov, syn. Calyptrosciadium polycladum
- Calyptrosciadium rechingeri Pimenov & Kljuykov
