= Mikulić =

Mikulić is a Croatian surname, a patronymic of the name Mikula. Notable people with the name include:

- Božo Mikulić (born 1997), Croatian footballer
- Branko Mikulić (1928–1994), communist politician and statesman in the Yugoslavia
- Ivan Mikulić (born 1968), Herzegovinian Croat singer who represented Croatia in the Eurovision Song Contest 2004
- Josip Mikulić (born 1986), Bosnian football defender, currently playing for NK Zagreb
- Luka Mikulić (born 2005), Bosnian footballer
- Marijana Mikulić (born 1981), Croatian actress
- Tomislav Mikulić (born 1982), Croatian football player who plays as a defender
- Zoran Mikulić (born 1965), Croatian handball player
- Zvonimir Mikulić (born 1990), Croatian footballer
