= Mikula =

Mikula may refer to:

- Mikula (surname)
- Mikula Krajačević (1582–1653), Croatian priest
- Mikula Selyaninovich, Russian legendary hero
- Mikula Golubev, fictional mutant character published by Marvel Comics
- 2969 Mikula, a Main-belt Asteroid
- The protagonist of the Croatian film Captain Mikula, the Kid

== See also ==
- Mikulić
