= Calyptrosciadium bungei =

Scientific classification
- Kingdom: Plantae
- Clade: Tracheophytes
- Clade: Angiosperms
- Clade: Eudicots
- Clade: Asterids
- Order: Apiales
- Family: Apiaceae
- Genus: Calyptrosciadium
- Species: C. bungei

Binomial name
- Calyptrosciadium bungei (Boiss.) Pimenov

Synonyms
- Prangos bungei Boiss.; Calyptrosciadium polycladum Rech.f. & Kuber; Calyptrosciadium polycladum subsp. bamianicum Leute

Species of plant

Calyptrosciadium bungei is a species of flowering plant in the family Apiaceae, native to Afghanistan and Iran. It was first described by Pierre Edmond Boissier in 1888 as Prangos bungei.
