= Veselin Beshevliev =

Bulgarian historian and philologist

- Born: 25 March 1900; Sofia, Bulgaria
- Died: March 1992 (aged 91–92); Sofia

Veselin Ivanov Beshevliev (Bulgarian: Веселин Иванов Бешевлиев; 25 March 1900 – c. 1992) was a Bulgarian historian and philologist. He was a correspondent member of the Bulgarian Academy of Sciences from 1941 to his death. Beshevliev is considered one of the world's top authorities on the history and culture of the Bulgars.

== Career ==
Beshevliev studied History and Slavic Philology at Sofia University from 1919 to 1920 and Classical Philology at the Universities of Halle, Jena and Würzburg in Germany from 1920 to 1925. He was awarded his PhD by the Julius Maximilian University of Würzburg in 1925. He subsequently taught Classical Philology at the Sofia University as an assistant (1925–1929), docent (1929–1933) and professor (1933–1944).

Beshevliev became a full member of the Bulgarian Institute of Archaeology in 1933 and a corresponding member of the Bulgarian Academy of Sciences (BAS) in 1941. After Bulgaria's occupation by the Soviet Union and the installation of the Fatherland Front's puppet government in 1944, Beshevliev was dismissed from his job and placed under State Security surveillance due to anonymous denunciations for "Greater Bulgarian chauvinism" and "fascist gall against the Government". Even though a 1945 investigation prompted by allegations of fascist sympathies found no evidence of the accusations, the surveillance continued until 1969.

After his rehabilitation in the mid-1950s, he headed the Epigraphy Department of the Archaeological Institute and Museum of BAS. Then, from 1964 until he retired in 1972, he was head of the Department of Ethnogenesis of Balkan Peoples and Historical Geography of the Balkans at BAS's Institute for Balkan Studies. Beshevliev was awarded the prestigious Herder Prize in 1972.

He died in Sofia on 9 October 1992.

=== Publications ===
- 1979, Old Bulgarian Inscriptions, first edition; 1992, second edition
- 1981, Proto-Bulgarian Epigraphic Monuments
