= Mikula (surname) =

The surname Mikula or Mikuła may refer to:

- Barbara Mikuła, founder of Polish independent music label Mystic Production
- David Mikula (born 1983), Czech footballer
- Jan Mikula (born 1992), Czech footballer
- Krzysztof Mikuła (born 1974), Polish politician
- Patrycja Mikula (born 1983), Polish model and Playboy Cybergirl
- Piotr Mikuła (born 1976), Polish Olympic field hockey player
- Susan Mikula (born 1958), American artist and photographer
- Tom Mikula (1926–2014), American football player
