= Vrap =

- Village
- Location within Albania
- Coordinates: 41°9′N 19°47′E
- Country: Albania
- County: Tirana
- Municipality: Tirana
- Administrative unit: Baldushk

Population
  - Total: 3,000+
- Time zone: UTC+1 (CET)
  - Summer (DST): UTC+2 (CEST)

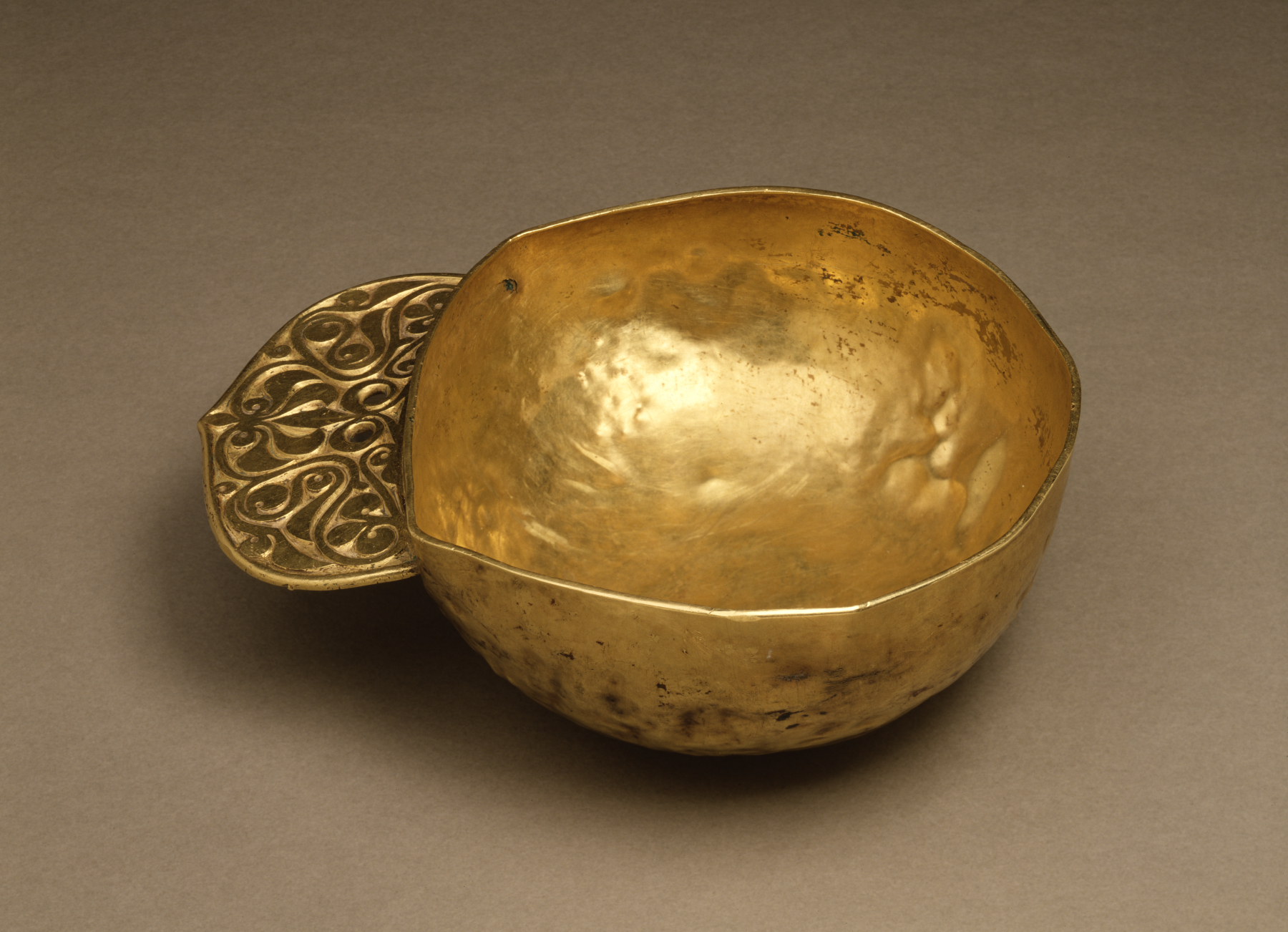
Avaric drinking bowl found in Vrap, now in Walters Art Museum.

Vrap (it means 'running' in Albanian) is a village in the former municipality of Baldushk in Tirana County, Albania. At the 2015 local government reform it became part of the municipality Tirana.

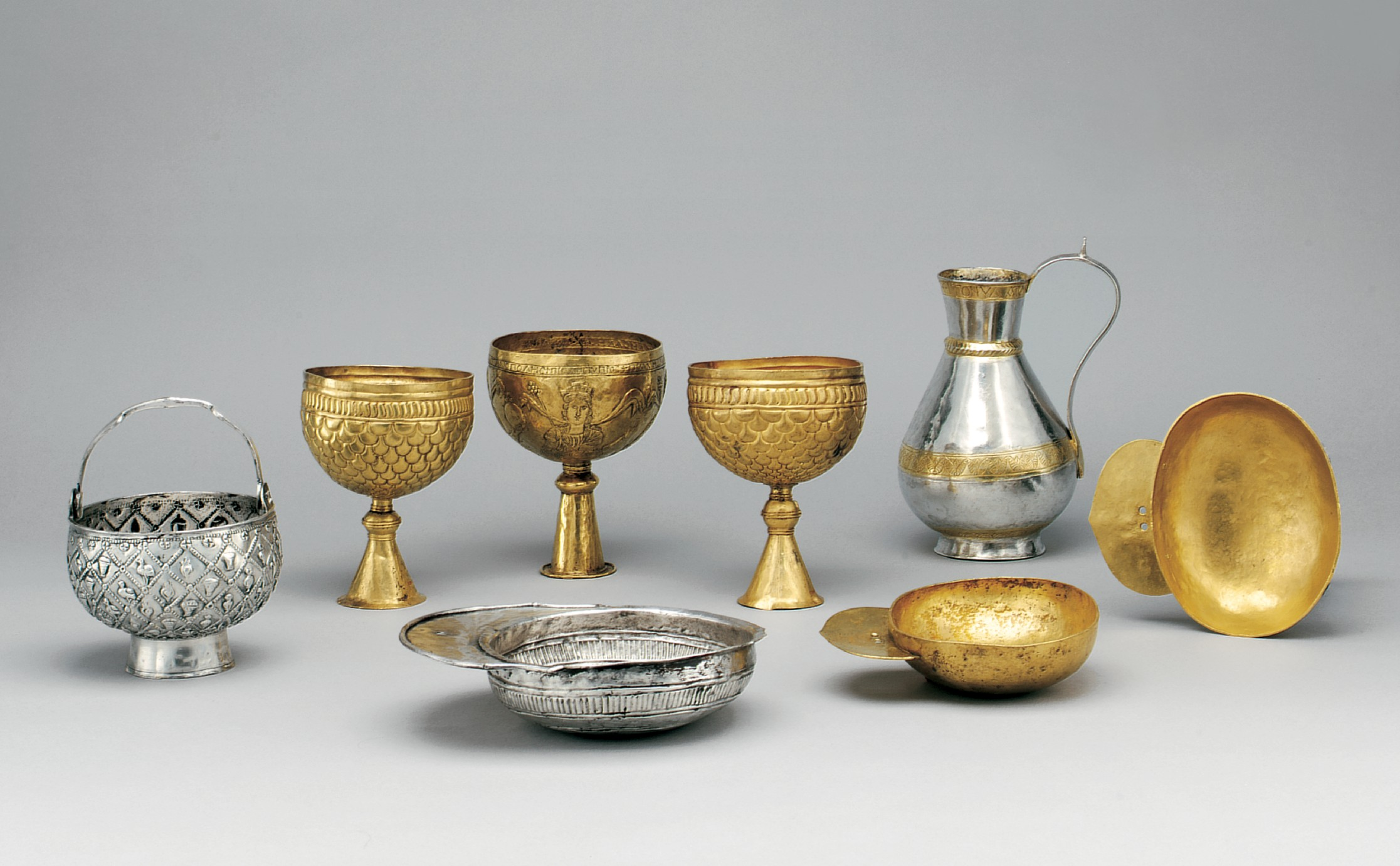
The Avar Treasure, on display at the Metropolitan Museum of Art

Vrapi is a village with a very old history. A long time ago there was a city called Akac. This city had 7 churches the ruins of which are still visible today. One of the most important was the "Saint George" church (kisha e Shen Gjergjit) that was the biggest and was used for its strategic position for the observation of the coastal area. The village lies in a wonderful geographical position. In this village in the old times there was a branch of the Egnatia road that connected the city of Durrës with that of Elbasan, whose traces are still recognisable today.
