= Ivan Mikulčić =

Macedonian archaeologist (1936–2020)

Ivan Mikulčić (Croatian: Ivan Luka Mikulčić; Macedonian: Иван Микулчиќ) was a prominent archaeologist from North Macedonia.

== Biography ==
Mikulcic was born on March 25, 1936, in the then Kingdom of Yugoslavia in the Srem town of Inđija to a Croat family. He graduated in archeology from the Faculty of Philosophy at the University of Belgrade in 1958, and in 1965 he defended his doctorate. He worked later in the museums in Stip, Bitola and Skopje, and since 1969 he was teaching at the Faculty of Philosophy at the University of Skopje. In 1969 he received the title of assistant, then associate professor (1974) and full professor (1979). He retired in 2000. Mikulčić has also been the head of the Institute of Art History and Archeology in Skopje for 10 years, as well as the Deputy Dean of the Faculty of Philosophy there. With his efforts a department of archeology was established with a special program within the mentioned Institute, where he was the organizer of the postgraduate training in archeology. Mikulcic focused his active field and office research on the archaeological heritage of North Macedonia and more broadly in the Balkans, working mainly on the Ancient period, and also in the study of Prehistory and the Middle Ages. Mikulicic died in June 2020 in Bitola.

== See also ==
- Historiography in North Macedonia
