= House of Mihajlo Apostolski =

Building in North Macedonia

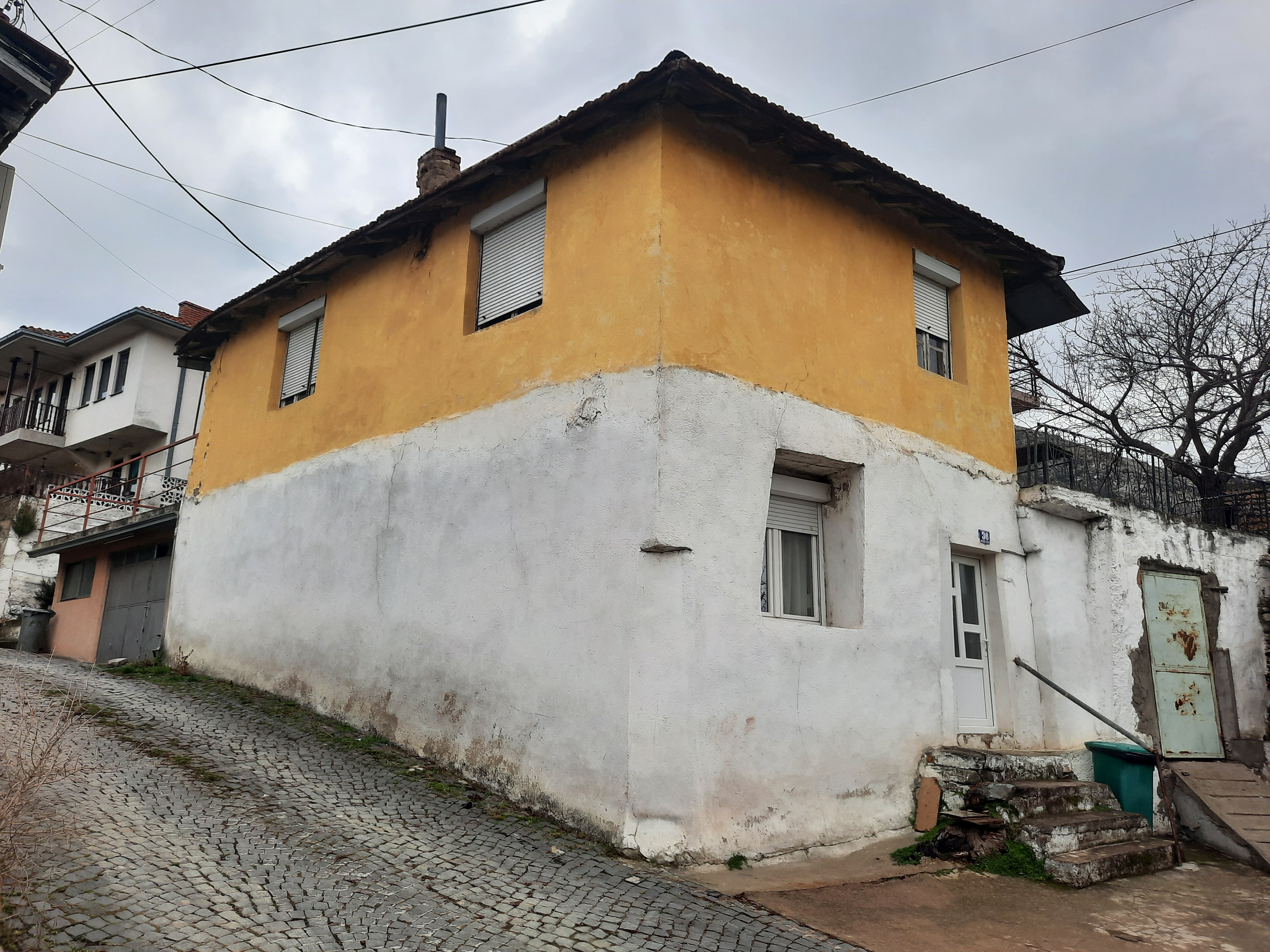
- The house in 2022

General information
- Status: Monument of Culture
- Location: Nikola Karev St. no. 36, Novo Selo, Štip, North Macedonia

Technical details
- Floor count: 2

The House of Mihajlo Apostolski is a house in the suburb of Novo Selo, Štip, North Macedonia. The house is the birthhouse of the Macedonian WWII general and statesman Mihajlo Apostolski and the building is registered as a Cultural Heritage of North Macedonia.

== Gallery ==
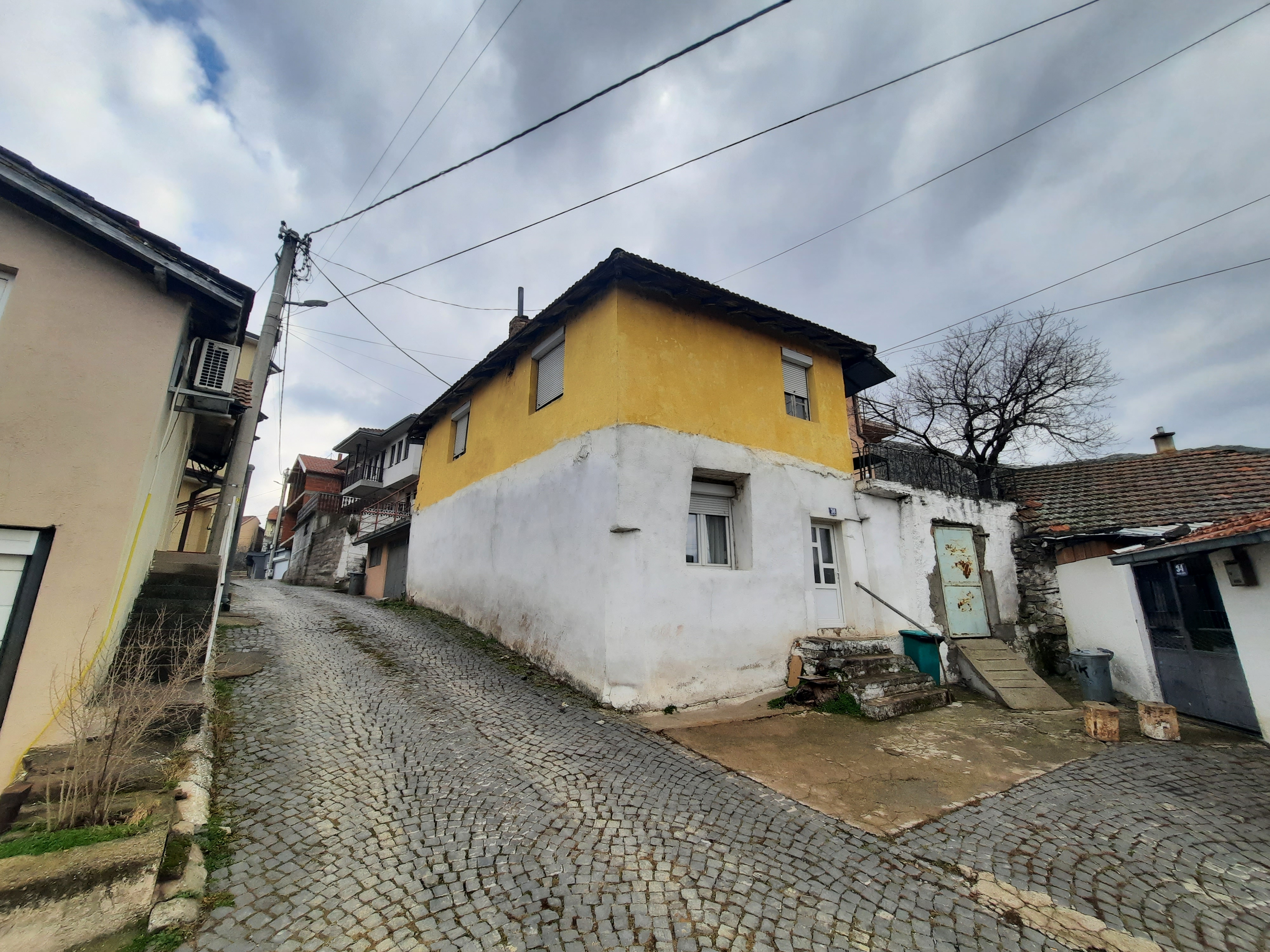

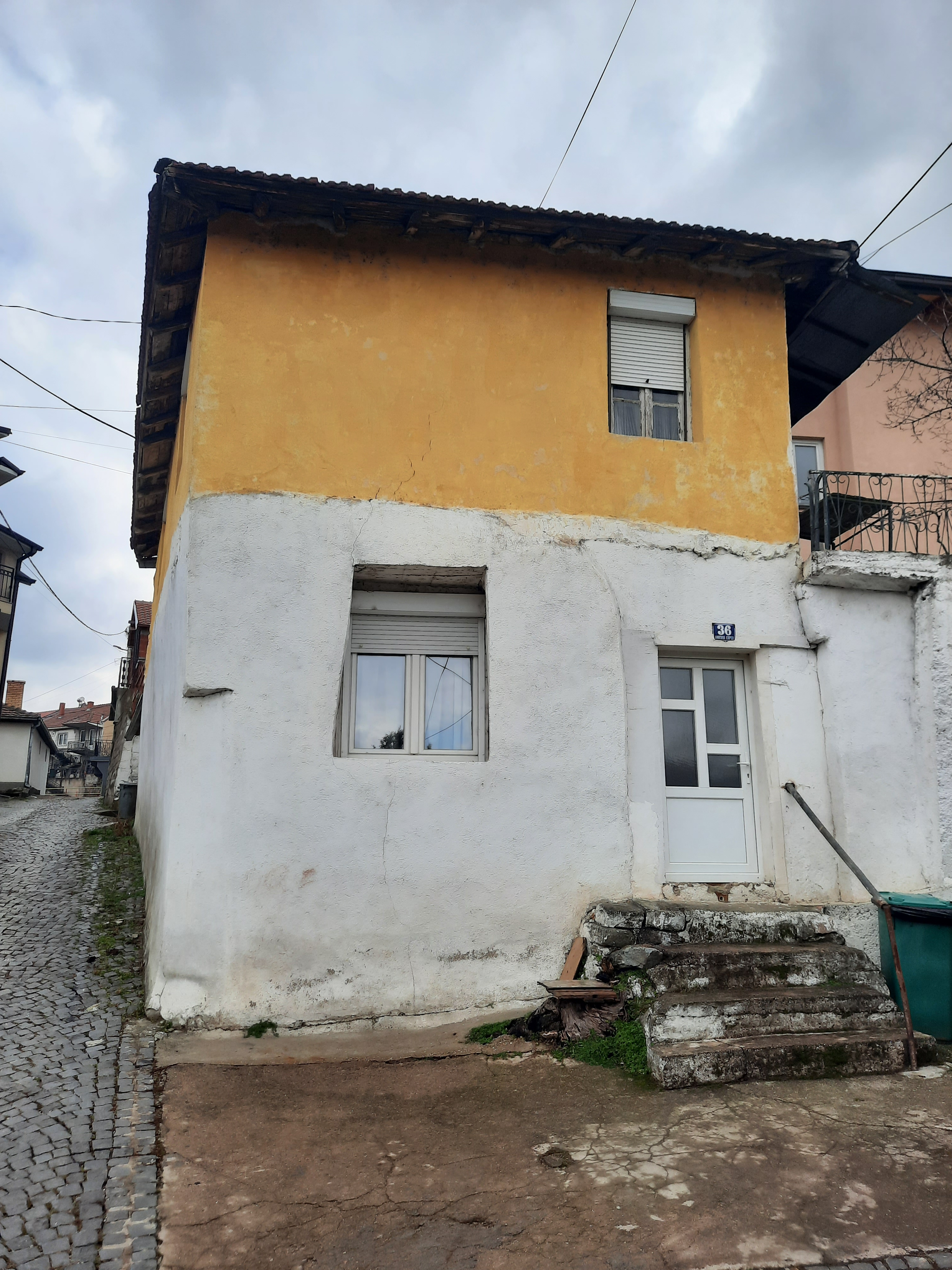

== See also ==
- House on Krste Misirkov St. no. 12 - a cultural heritage site
- House on Krste Misirkov St. no. 14 - a cultural heritage site
- House on Krste Misirkov St. no. 67 - a cultural heritage site
- House on Krste Misirkov St. no. 69 - a cultural heritage site
- Dormition of the Theotokos Church - the seat of Novo Selo Parish and a cultural heritage site
- Novo Selo School - the building of the former school and the present seat of the Rectorate of the Goce Delčev University. It is also a cultural heritage site
- Ascension of Christ Church - a 14th-century church and a cultural heritage site
