= House on Krste Misirkov St. no. 30, Štip =

House on Krste Misirkov St. no. 30
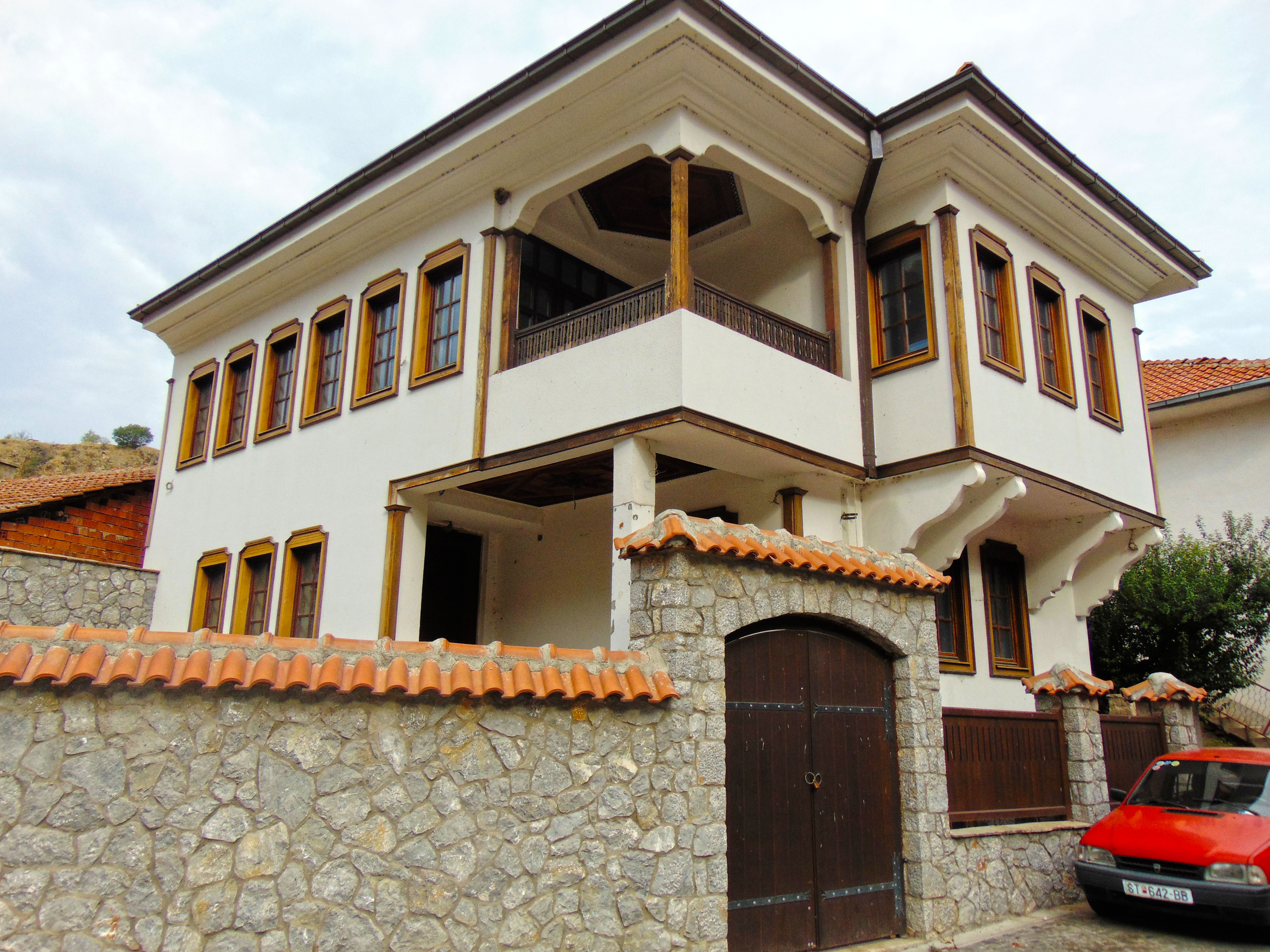
- The house in 2021
- Interactive map of the House on Krste Misirkov St. no. 30 area

General information
- Status: Monument of Culture
- Location: Krste Misirkov St. no. 30, Novo Selo, Štip, North Macedonia
- Coordinates: 41.73471403°N 22.18101235°E
- Owner: Mijalkov family (formerly)

Technical details
- Floor count: 2

The House on Krste Misirkov St. no. 30 is a house in the suburb of Novo Selo, Štip, North Macedonia. The house is registered as a Cultural Heritage of North Macedonia.

== Галерија ==
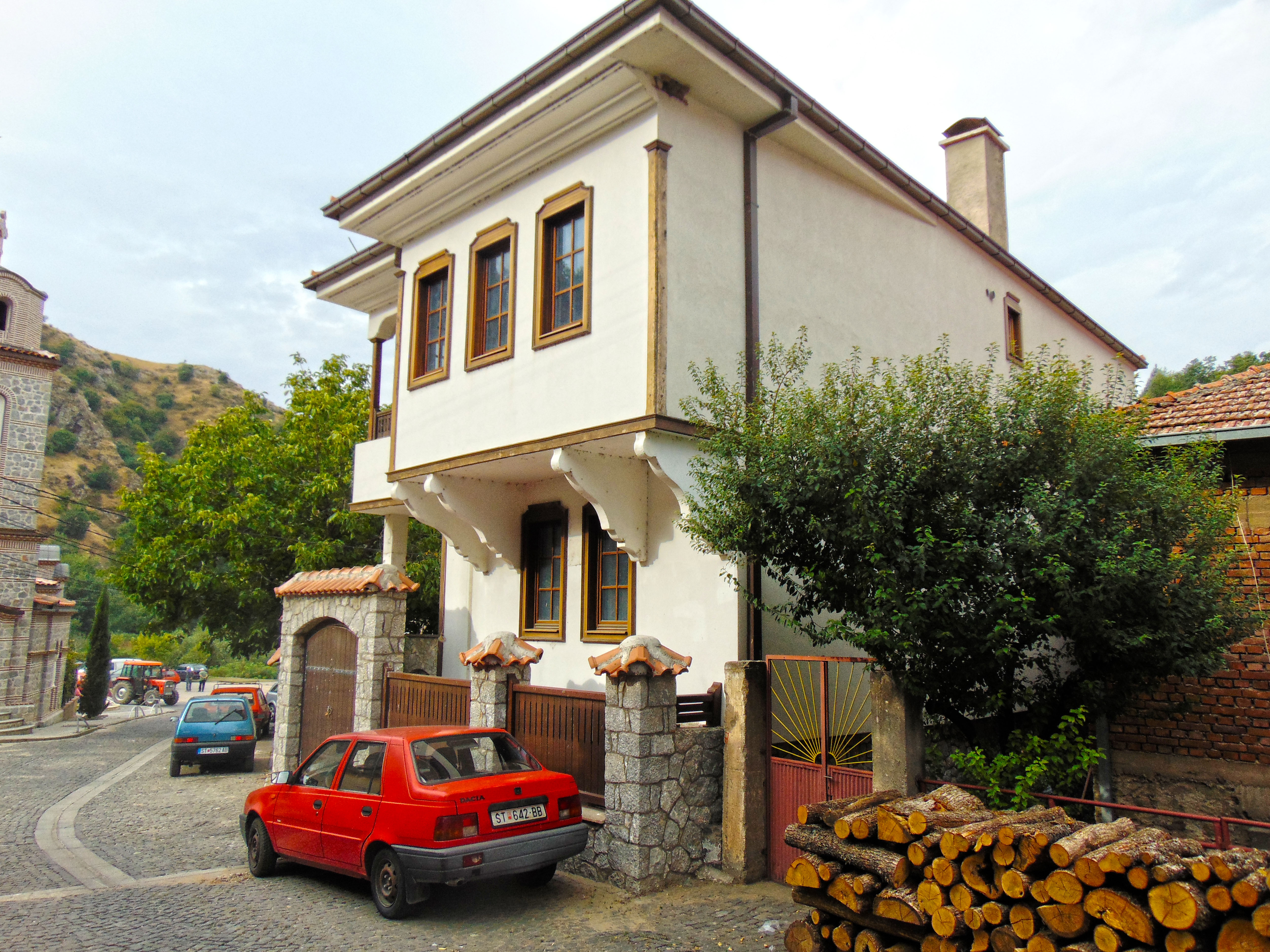
The house seen from north-east

== See also ==
- Museum of the Activists of IMRO from Štip and Štip Region - a historical museum and cultural heritage site
- House on Krste Misirkov St. no. 67, Štip - a cultural heritage site
- House on Krste Misirkov St. no. 69, Štip - a cultural heritage site
- Dormition of the Theotokos Church - the seat of Novo Selo Parish and a cultural heritage site
- Novo Selo School - the building of the former school and the present seat of the Rectorate of the Goce Delčev University. It is also a cultural heritage site
