= Museum of the Activists of IMRO from Štip and Štip Region =

- Музеј на дејците на ВМРО од Штип и Штипско; Muzej na dejcite na VMRO od Štip i Štipsko
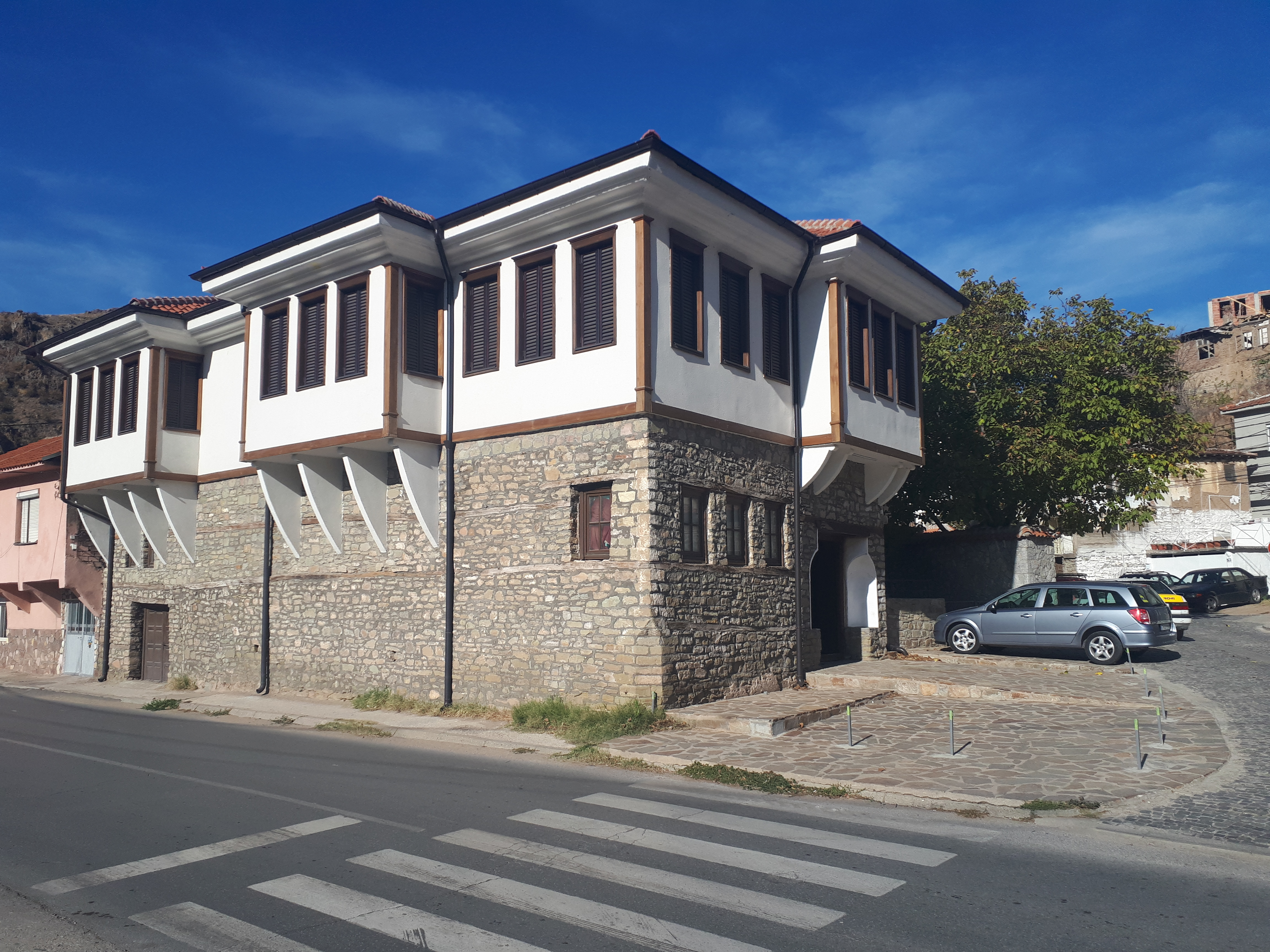
- The museum in 2018
- Established: December 20, 2014
- Location: "Krste Misirkov" Str. no. 34; Novo Selo, Štip, North Macedonia
- Type: Historical museum
- Андонова куќа Andonova kukja (Macedonian)
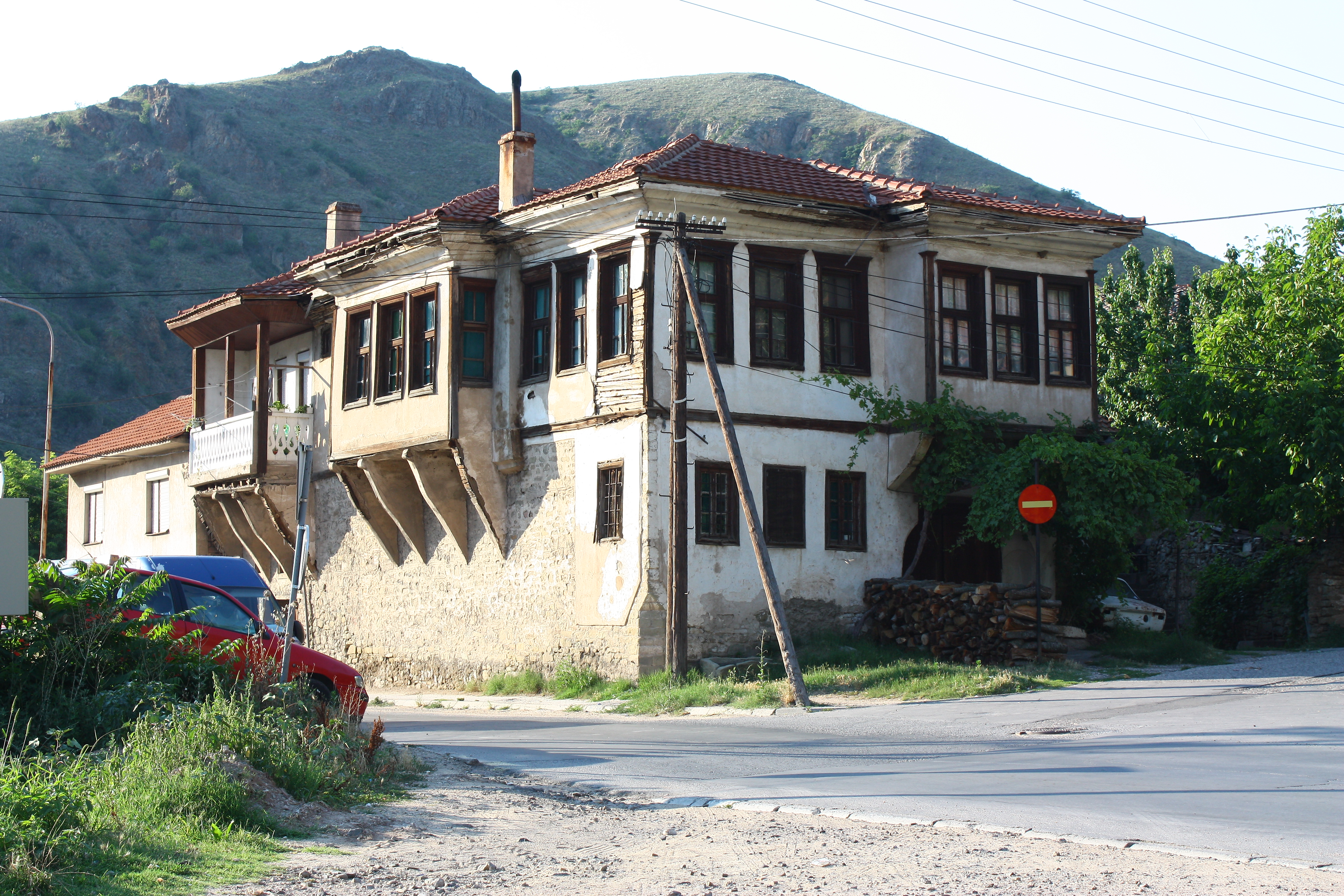
- The house in 2010
- 41°44′04″N 22°10′51″E

Site notes
- Owner: Štip Museum; Andonov family (formerly)

The Museum of the Activists of IMRO from Štip and Štip Region, the building also known as House of Andonov, is a historical museum in Novo Selo, Štip, North Macedonia. The building, which is part of the old town architecture, is registered as a Cultural Heritage of North Macedonia under the name House on "Krste Misirkov" Str. no. 34. The museum is dedicated to IMRO (VMRO) activists and its revolutionary activity in and around the area of the town of Štip.

== History ==
=== As a house ===
The national-revival era house was owned by the Andonovi family.

=== As a museum ===
The house was restored and purchased by the Ministry of Culture. The museum was officially opened by the then Prime Minister Nikola Gruevski, the Minister of Culture Elizabeta Kančeska Milevska and the Mayor of Štip Municipality, Ilčo Zahariev in 2014.

The museum exhibits documents, weapons and objects, as well as 11 wax figures of the teachers in Štip and leaders of the Macedonian Revolutionary Organization, Goce Delčev, Dame Gruev and Gjorče Petrov as well as many Štip figures including Miše Razvigorov, Todor Aleksandrov and Vančo Mihajlov. These items are displayed within seven exhibition galleries in the museum building.

The museum covers the period from the founding of IMRO in 1893 to the liquidation of IMRO in 1934 and is under the jurisdiction of the Štip Museum.

== Gallery ==
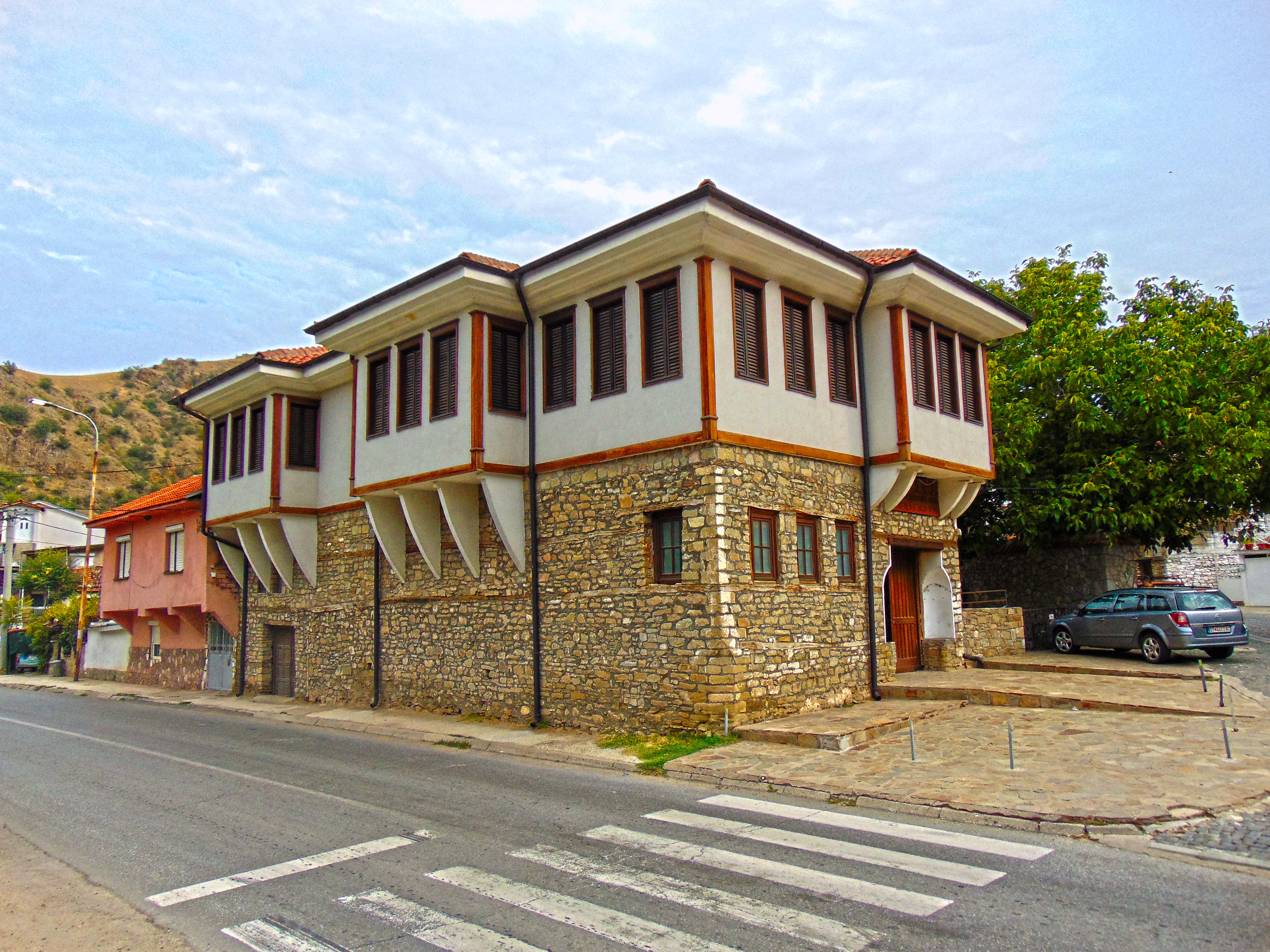

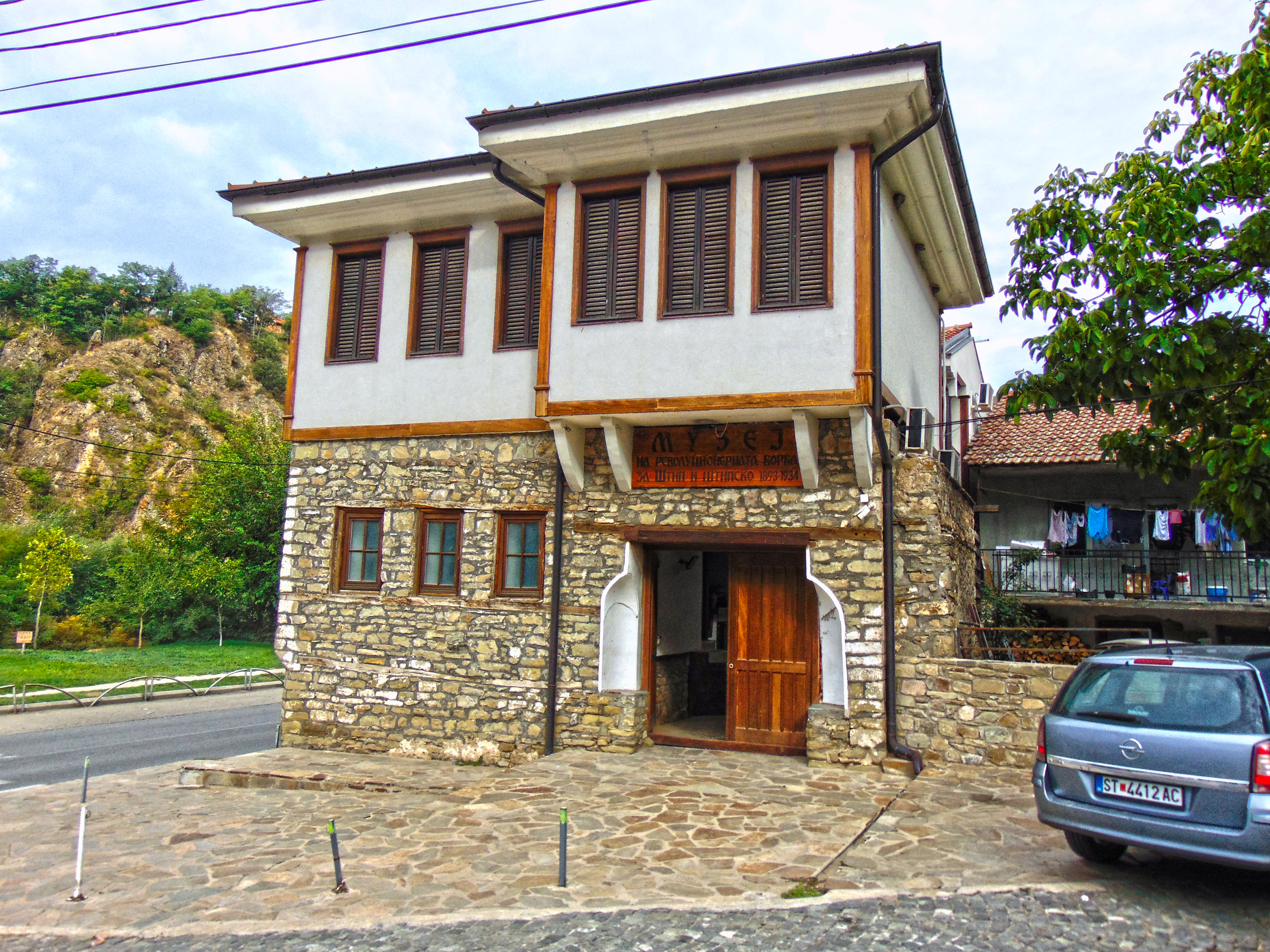

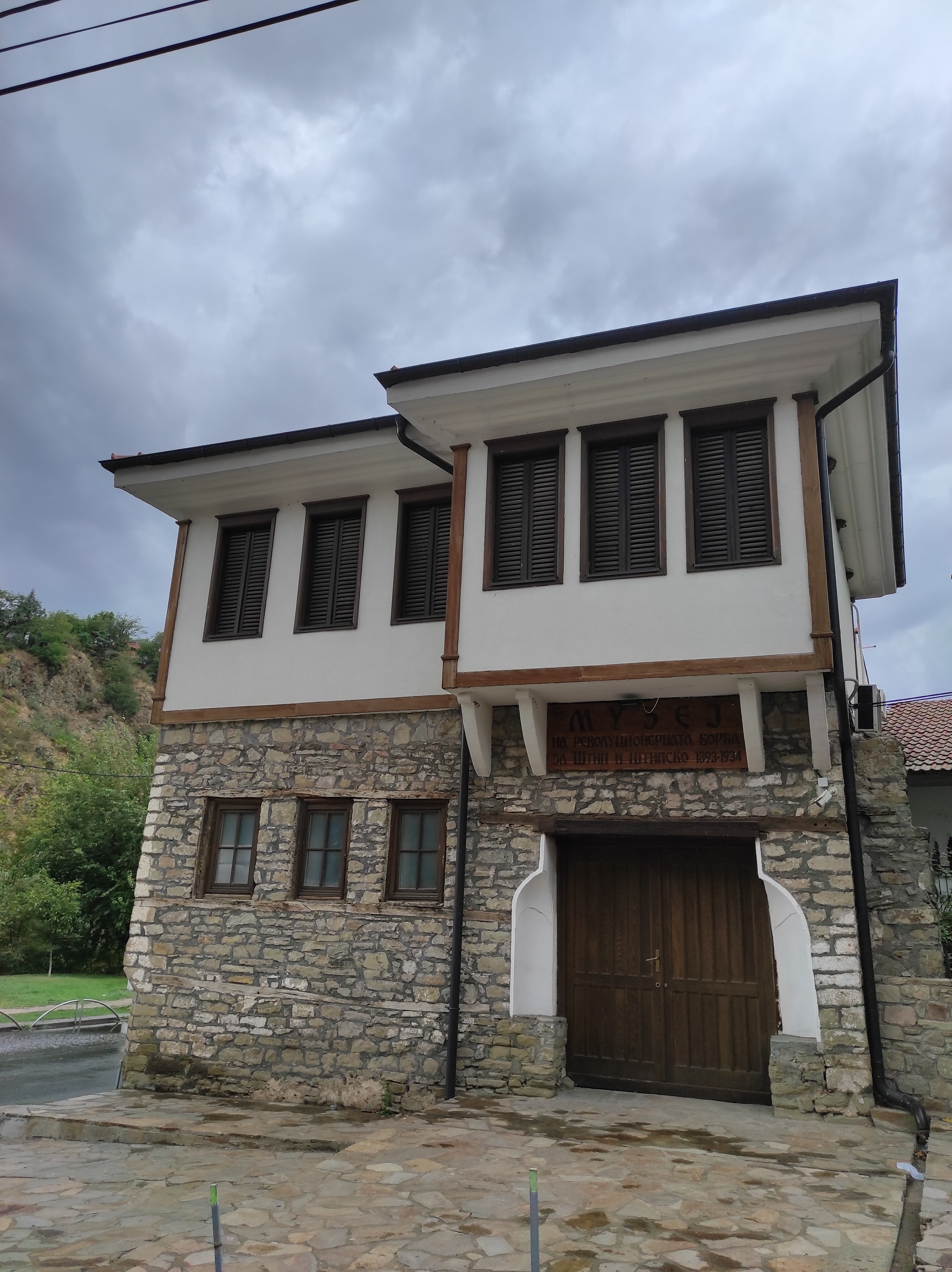

== See also ==
- House on Krste Misirkov St. no. 30, Štip – a cultural heritage site
- House on Krste Misirkov St. no. 67, Štip – a cultural heritage site
- House on Krste Misirkov St. no. 69, Štip – a cultural heritage site
- Dormition of the Theotokos Church – the seat of Novo Selo Parish and a cultural heritage site
- Novo Selo School – the building of the former school and the present seat of the Rectorate of the Goce Delčev University. It is also a cultural heritage site
