= Apostolski =

Apostolski (feminine form Apostolska) is a surname. Notable people with the surname include:

- Mihailo Apostolski (1906–1987), Yugoslav Partisan
- Cveta Apostolska (born 1913), Yugoslav Partisan
- Vancho Apostolski (1925–2008), President of the Presidency of the Socialist Republic of Macedonia
- Mile Apostolski (born 1927), Yugoslav Partisan
- Elżbieta Apostolska (born 1944), Polish gymnast
- Alin Apostolska (born 1961), French and Canadian author of Macedonian origin
