= Mihailo Apostolski =

Macedonian partisan and military leader

- Михаило Апостолски
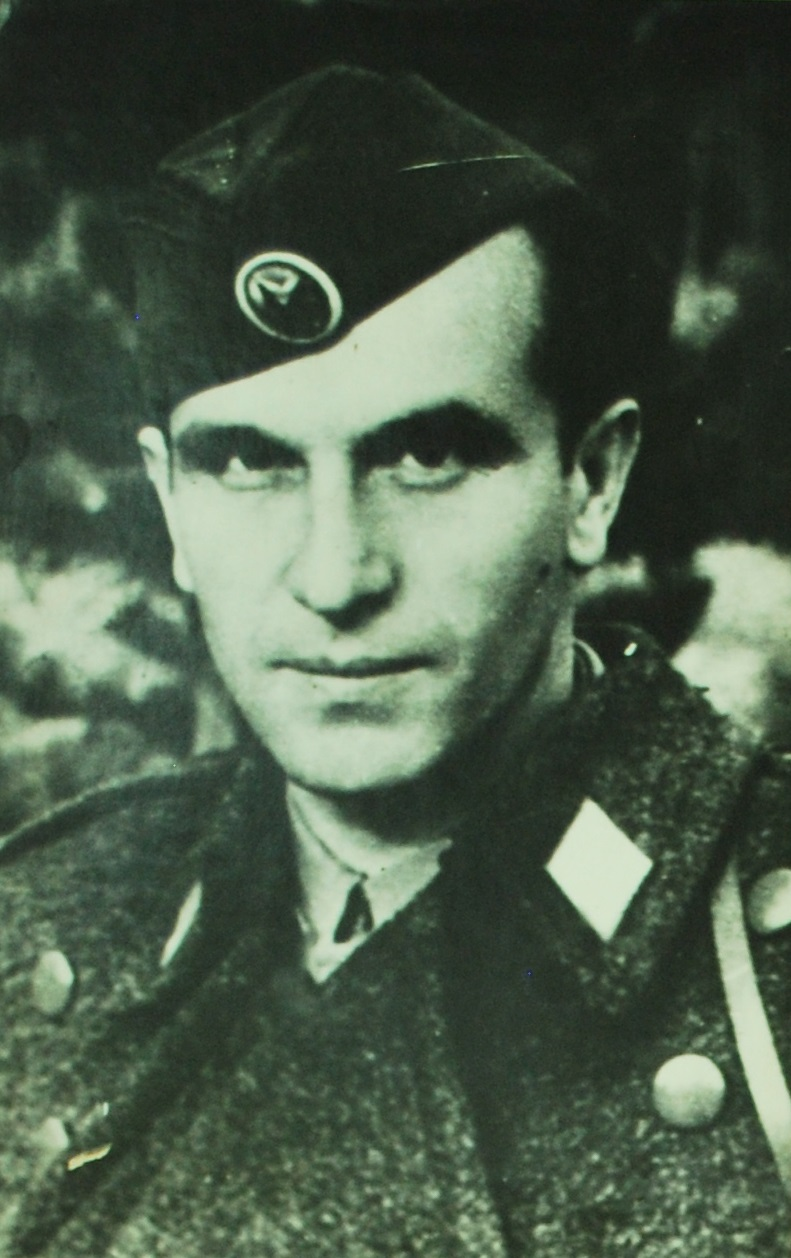
- Born: November 8, 1906; Novo Selo, Ottoman Empire
- Died: August 7, 1987 (aged 80); Dojran, SFR Yugoslavia
- Education: Military Academy, Kingdom of Yugoslavia
- Spouse: Cveta Apostolska
- Military career
- Allegiance: Kingdom of Yugoslavia; SFR Yugoslavia
- Rank: Colonel General
- Known for: Commander of the Headquarters of the People's Liberation Army and Partisan detachments in Macedonia during World War II.

Mihailo Apostolski (Macedonian: Михаило Апостолски; November 8, 1906 – August 7, 1987), also known as Mihail Mitev Apostolov (Bulgarian: Михаил Митев Апостолов) and Mihailo Mitić (Serbian: Михаило Митић), was a Macedonian general, partisan, military theoretician, politician, academic and historian. He was the commander of the General Staff of the National Liberation Army and Partisan Detachments of Macedonia, colonel general of the Yugoslav People's Army, and was declared a People's Hero of Yugoslavia.

== Life ==
=== Early life ===
Apostolski was born as Mihail Mitev Apostolov in Novo Selo, in the Kosovo vilayet of the Ottoman Empire (now North Macedonia) on November 8, 1906, into a Bulgarian Exarchist family, to Mite Apostolov and Vasa Apostolova. He attended primary and secondary school in Štip. In the interwar period, he was known under the name Mihajlo Mitić. On October 1, 1924, he enrolled into the Military Academy in Belgrade (capital of Kingdom of Yugoslavia), graduating from it on April 1, 1927. He became an infantry second lieutenant, and then he was appointed as sergeant in the 23rd Infantry Regiment in Štip, holding the latter position until September 28, 1931. Apostolski acquired the rank of infantry lieutenant on April 3, 1931. On October 1, 1941, he enrolled into the High Military Academy, graduating from it on November 7, 1933. On October 29, 1933, he married Cveta Pančević, the sister of future first Macedonian president Kiro Gligorov. On October 9, 1933, he was appointed as acting commander of the First Company of the 43rd Infantry Regiment. After serving as commander of the First Company of the 13th Mountain Battalion, he was promoted to Captain Second Class on April 3, 1935. In October 1935, he was accepted as a trainee for the General Staff profession, and he successfully completed the trainee period in March 1938. He was then assigned to serve in the General Staff of the 38th Infantry Division Dravska in Ljubljana and was promoted to Captain First Class on April 3, 1938. In 1938, he graduated from the Commanding Academy as a major.

=== During World War II ===
During the invasion of Yugoslavia in April 1941, he was a General Staff Major of the Royal Yugoslav Army in Ljubljana. Apostolski was assigned to serve in the rear command of the Triglav Division Headquarters, with the division as part of the 7th Army having the task of defending the border front towards Italy. After the capitulation of Yugoslavia and the subsequent occupation of Vardar Macedonia, Apostolski returned to Ljubljana after a brief stay in Belgrade, where he was captured by the Italian army and was taken to the camp Vestone. Shortly after, his father, a First World War Bulgarian army veteran, petitioned the Bulgarian Minister of Defense to help release Apostolski. On this occasion, an order was issued to the military attaché in Rome to take action so that Yugoslav prisoners of war from Bulgarian background can be set free from Italian captivity, among whom Apostolski was named first.

After being released from prison, Apostolski received a certificate that he was a "Bulgarian" on June 23, 1941. On November 18, he filed an application for appointment in the Bulgarian army. He was offered the rank of captain, however he refused. On December 15, General Konstantin Lukash, interceded for him, looking for a job in the Bulgarian State Railways' system, but without success. Afterwards, Apostolski entered the Sofia University under a fake name, where he conducted underground work. In April 1942, he became a member of the Communist Party of Yugoslavia, and in June the same year he was appointed as commander of the General Staff of the National Liberation Army and Partisan Detachments of Macedonia. On May 1, 1943, he was promoted to Major General. During the Second Session of Anti-Fascist Council for the National Liberation of Yugoslavia (AVNOJ), he was listed as a participant, although he did not participate. On October 1, 1944, he was promoted to Lieutenant General. He became a member of the Initiative committee for the organization of the Antifascist Assembly of the National Liberation of Macedonia (ASNOM). Apostolski participated in the First Session of the ASNOM and was elected to its presidency.

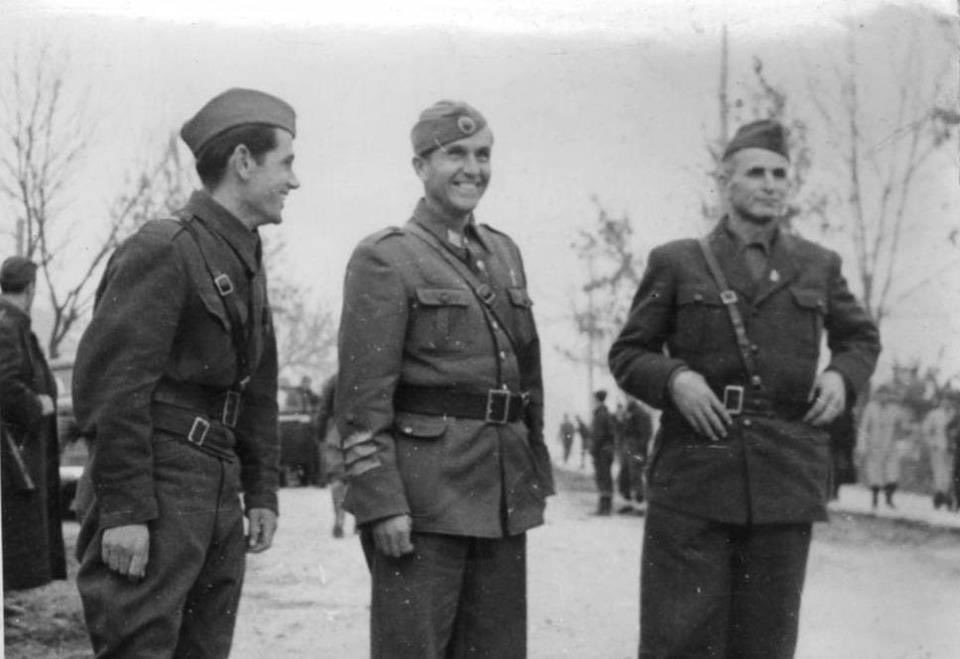
Apostolski and Metodija Andonov in liberated Bitola in November 1944.

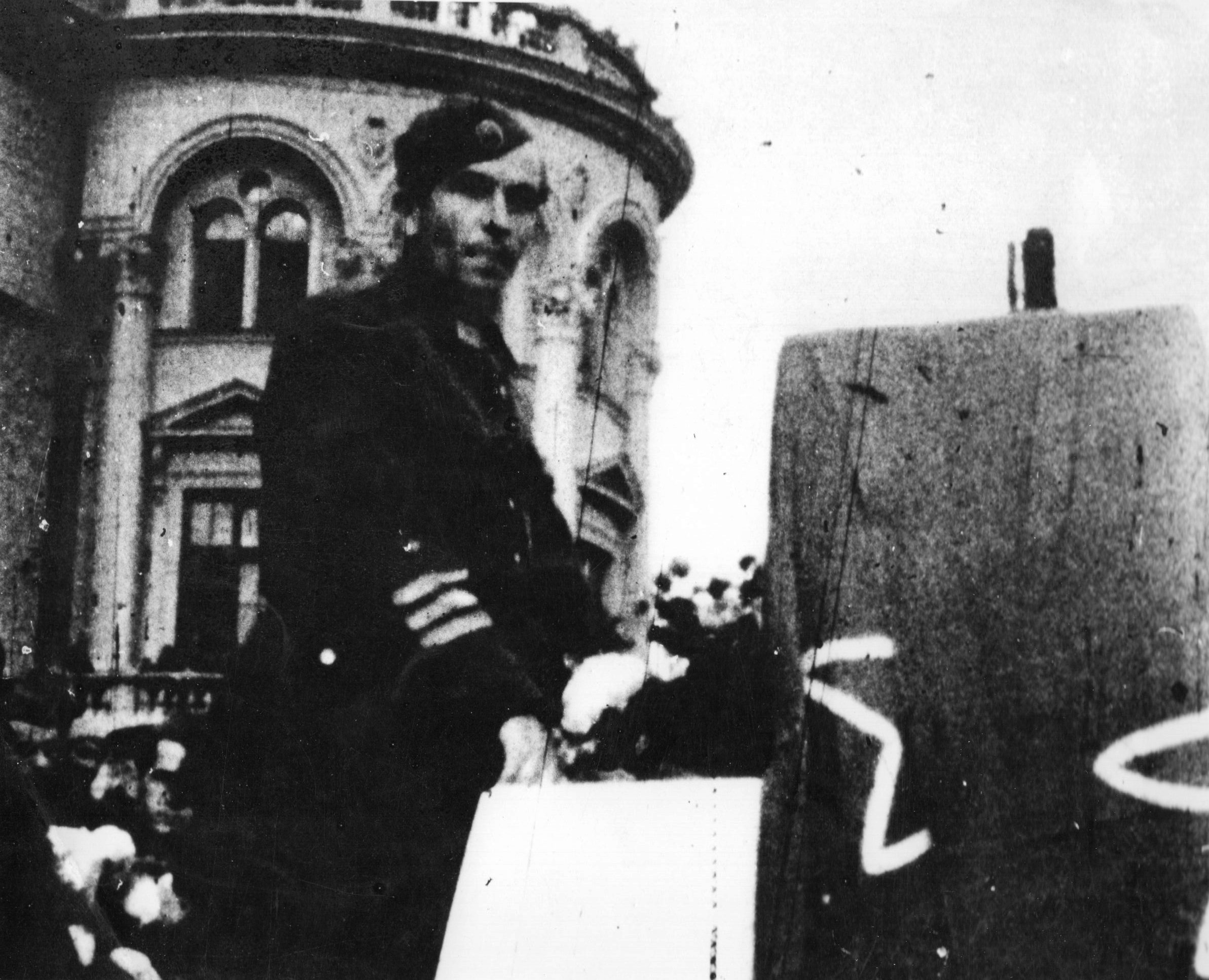
Apostolski delivering a speech in Skopje at end of the National Liberation War of Macedonia in 1945.

=== After World War II ===
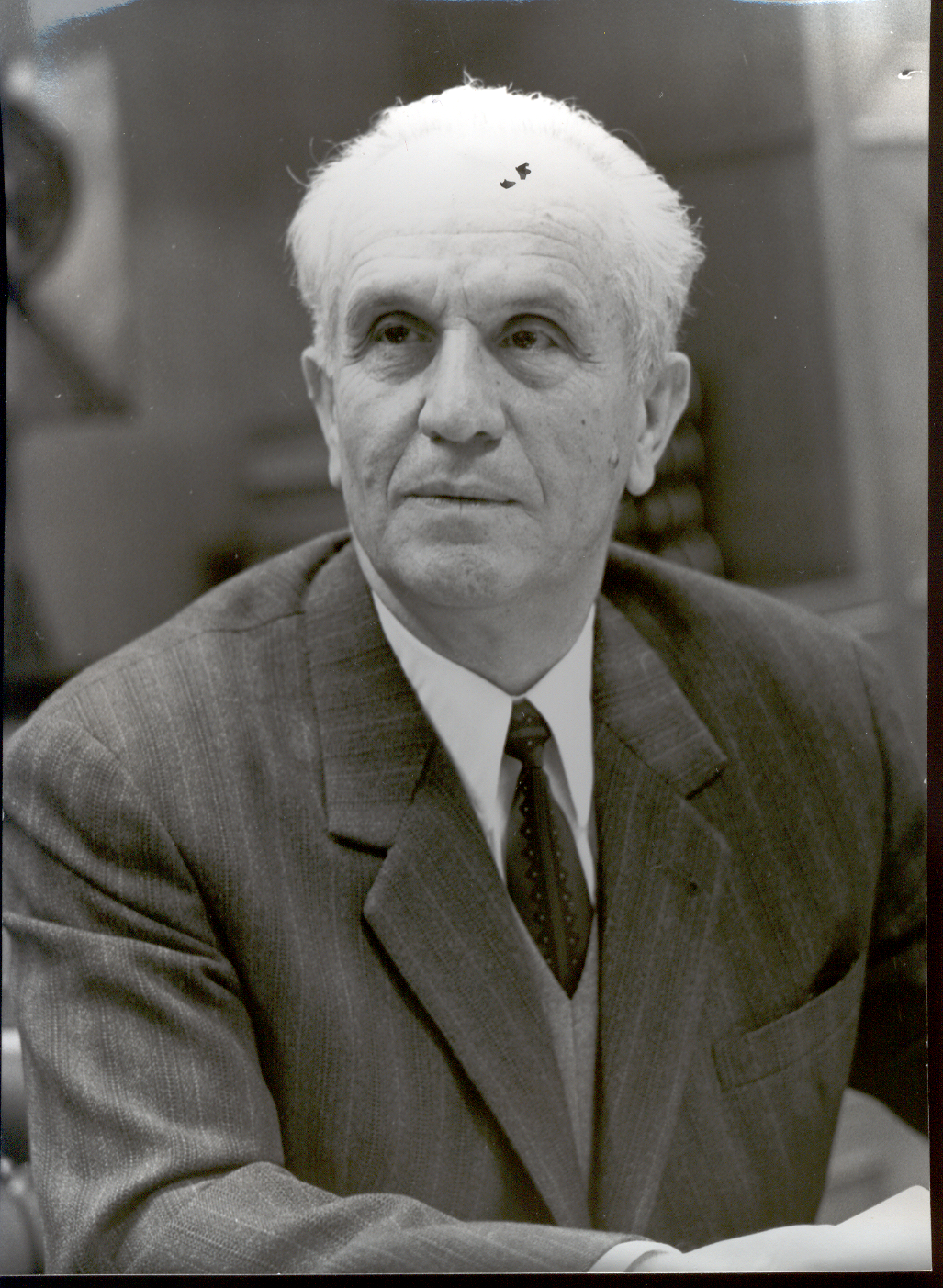
Apostolski as president of Macedonian Academy of Sciences and Arts in 1976.

After the Second World War, Apostolski pursued a career in the Yugoslav People's Army, serving as deputy head of its General Staff, commander of the Sarajevo districts (6th Army 1946-48, and 7th Military District (1948-52)), and director of the military academy. On October 9, 1953, he was declared as a People's Hero of Yugoslavia and received the Commemorative Medal of the Partisans of 1941. He retired as a military officer in 1958 with the rank of Colonel General. Apostolski became an academic and historian, dedicating himself to the affirmation of the Macedonian nation, identity and language. He researched the history of the National Liberation Struggle. From 1965 to 1970, he was the head of the Institute of National History in Skopje, SR Macedonia. He also served as editor-in-chief of the three-volume book History of the Macedonian People, published in 1969. In 1967, he became a professor in the Philosophical Faculty in the University of Skopje. From July 1978 to June 1981, he was the president of the Council of the Academies of Sciences and Arts of Yugoslavia. As a representative of the Yugoslav Macedonian historiography, he downplayed the decisive role of the Bulgarians in the capture of Skopje in 1944. Apostolski caused a scandal with the leadership of the Bulgarian Communist Party, Bulgarian scientists, and the Bulgarian media with an article published in the Belgrade magazine NIN in 1979, where he stigmatized the Bulgarians as morally inferior people. He was accused by Bulgarian academics of systematically falsifying history and using hate speech against Bulgaria and the Bulgarian people. He was actively involved in the formation of the Macedonian Academy of Sciences and Arts, of which he was member of since its creation. He was also its president from 1976 to 1983. He was also a member of:

- Serbian Academy of Sciences,
- Yugoslav Academy of Sciences and Arts (now: Croatian Academy of Sciences and Arts),
- Academy of Sciences and Arts of Bosnia and Herzegovina and
- Academy of Sciences and Arts of Kosovo.

On June 14, 1982, he became doctor of military science. He died on August 7, 1987, in Dojran, SR Macedonia, SFR Yugoslavia.

== Legacy ==
His birthplace, the House of Mihajlo Apostolski, is recognized as a protected object of Cultural Heritage of North Macedonia. In 1995, the Military Academy in Skopje, Republic of Macedonia (now North Macedonia), was named "General Mihailo Apostolski". Per historian Chris Kostov, the works by him and his contemporaries were based on their negative experiences with the Bulgarian authorities.
