= Novo Selo (Štip suburb) =

Novo Selo Ново Село
- Suburb
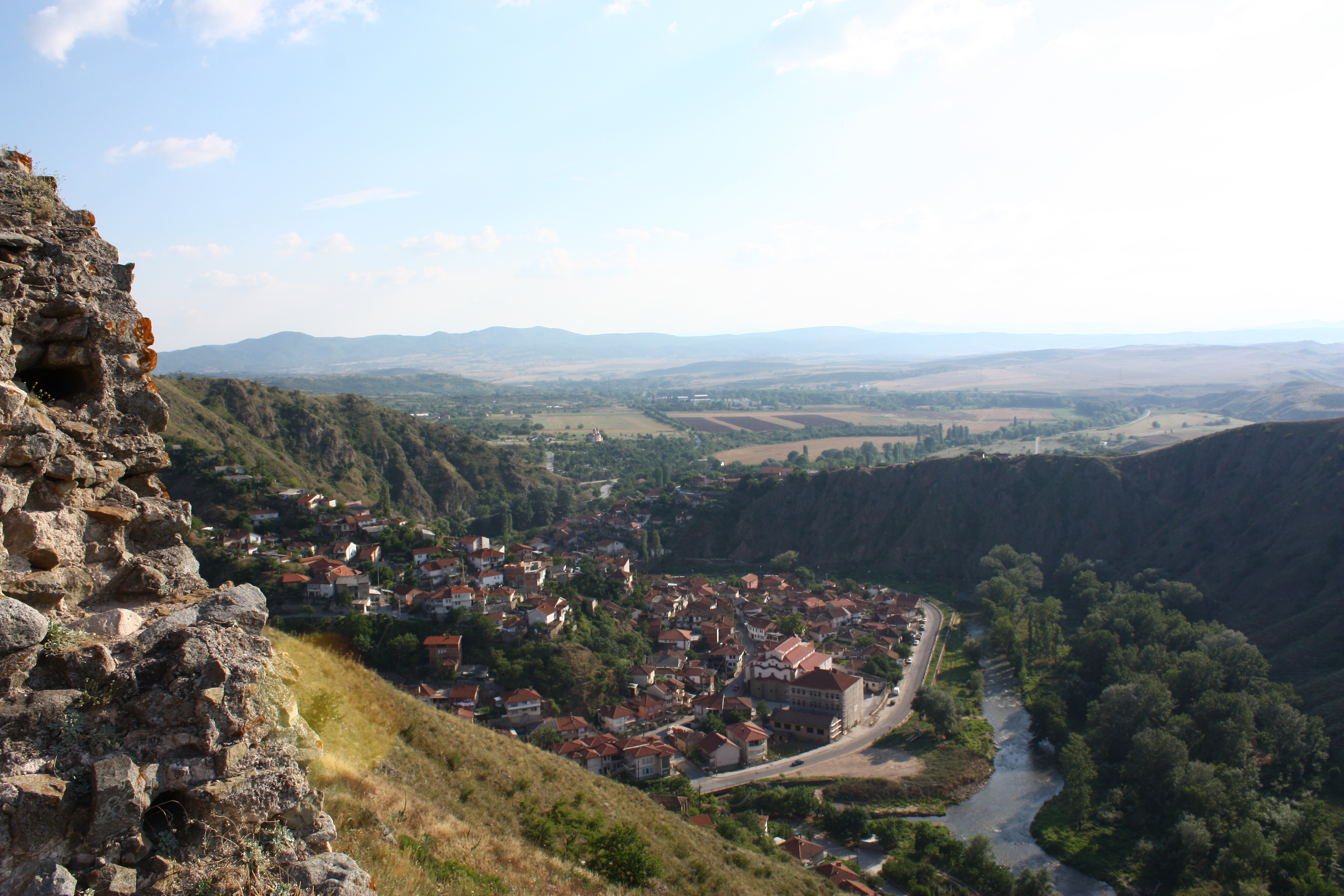
- Panorama of the suburb taken from the Štip Fortress
- Etymology: New Village
- Interactive map of Novo Selo
- Country: North Macedonia
- Municipality: Štip
- Elevation: 300 m (980 ft)

Population (2002)
  - Total: 3,636

Novo Selo (Macedonian: Ново Село) is a suburb adjacent to the town of Štip.

== Geography and location ==
Novo Selo is located in the greater urban area of Štip and colloquially it is considered to be a suburb of the town. The access to Novo Selo is along the river Otinja, which in the village flows into Bregalnica. The settlement is located on both sides of Bregalnica and most of it is on the left side. Immediately above Novo Selo is the hill on which the Štip fortress is built, also called Isar or Isarot.

== History ==
Novo Selo is one of the oldest settlements in this area. Although there is no precise data on its creation, it is assumed that Novo Selo existed as a separate settlement before the 13th century, as evidenced by the numerous churches from that period, including the Ascension of Christ Church, which is the oldest church in the vicinity of Štip. During the 13th and 14th century, Novo Selo was a waqf of Sultan Bayazit, and then, in the time of Sultan Murat, Novo Selo was declared a military and guard settlement, thus gaining special rights and privileges. According to the 1519 census, there were 21 Christian families living in Novo Selo. In the census registers of 1570, 30 Christian families and 5 unmarried Christians were registered in Novo Selo.

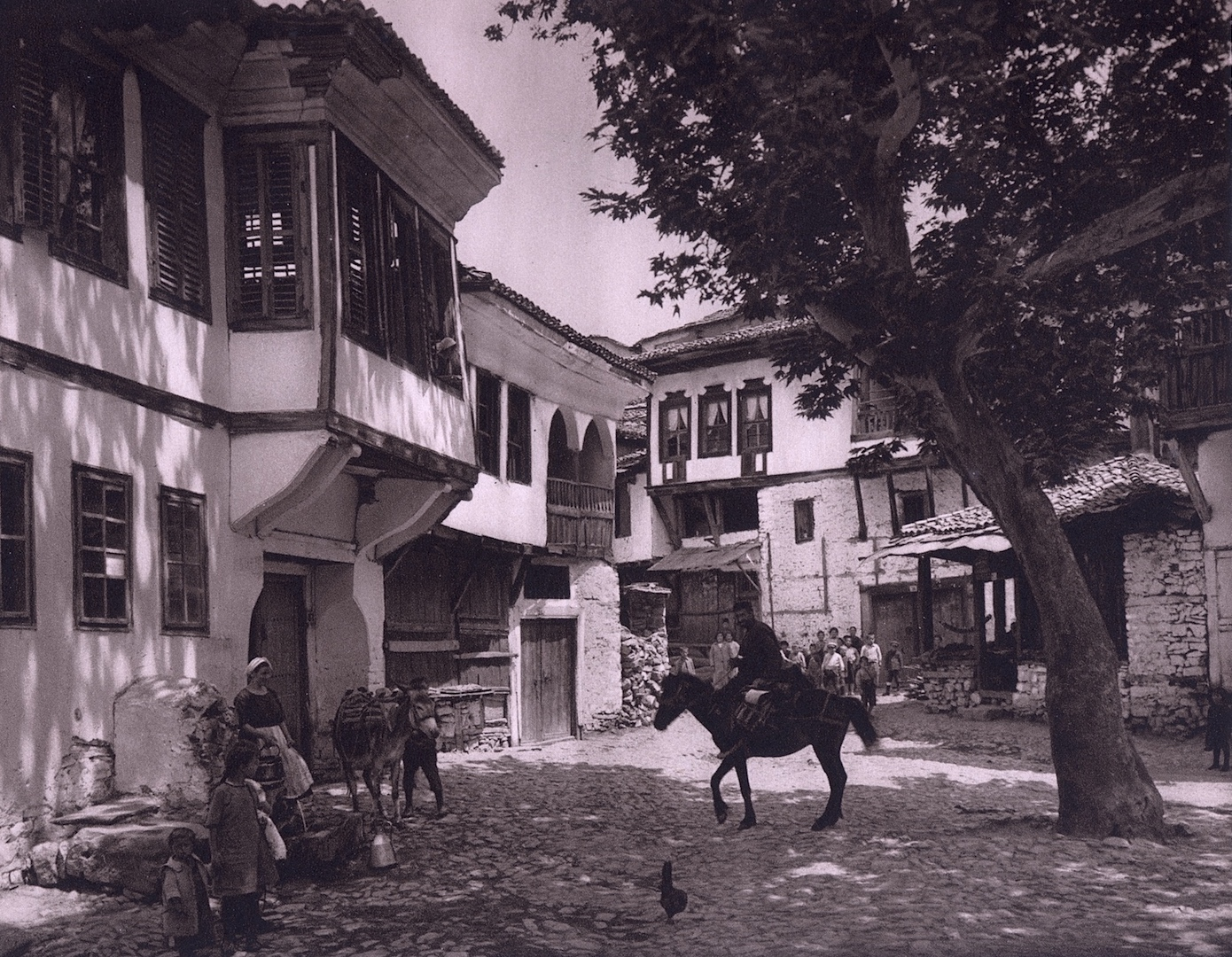
Novo Selo in 1926.

In the 19th century, Novo Selo played an important role in awakening the national consciousness and the struggle against the Ottoman rule, especially with the arrival of Damjan Gruev and Goce Delčev, who worked as teachers in the Novo Selo School.

At the beginning of the 20th century, Novo Selo was inhabited exclusively by a Bulgarian Christian population. All its inhabitants fell under the supremacy of the Bulgarian Exarchate. According to the data of the Exarchate Secretary Dimitar Mishev ("Macedonia and its Christian Population") in 1905. There were 3,616 Bulgarians living in the village (all under the Exarchate) and there were two Bulgarian schools – one primary and one secondary school with 412 students.

== Demographics ==
According to the 2002 census, the suburb of Novo Selo had over 3,636 inhabitants, all Macedonians.

== Education ==
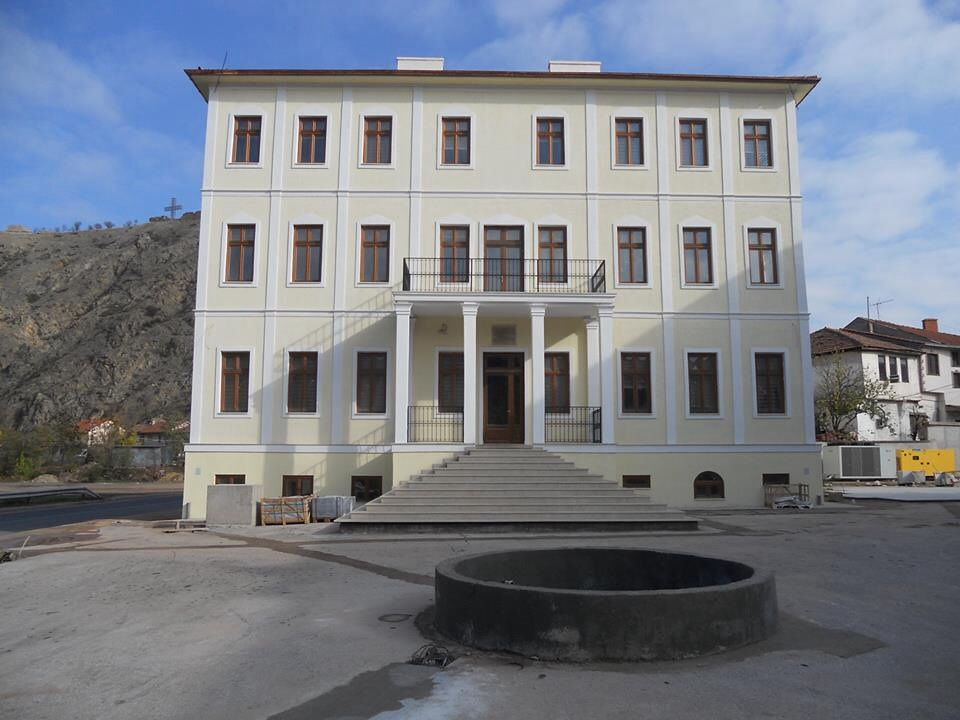
The building of the former Ottoman era Bulgarian School, now Rectorate.

The Rectorate of the Goce Delčev University is located in Novo Selo. The Rectorate is located in the building of the former Novo Selo School.

== Religion ==
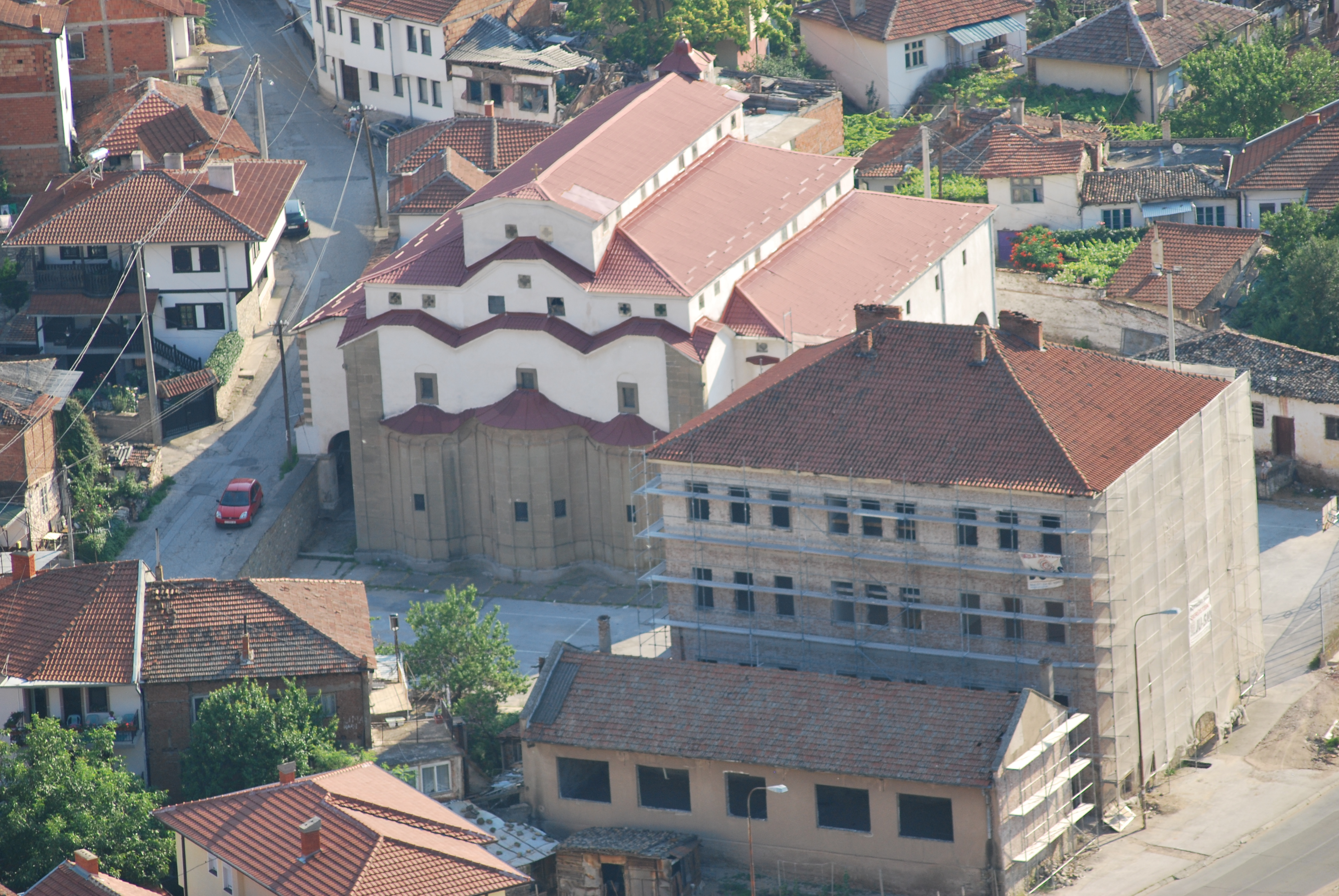
Dormition of the Theotokos Church

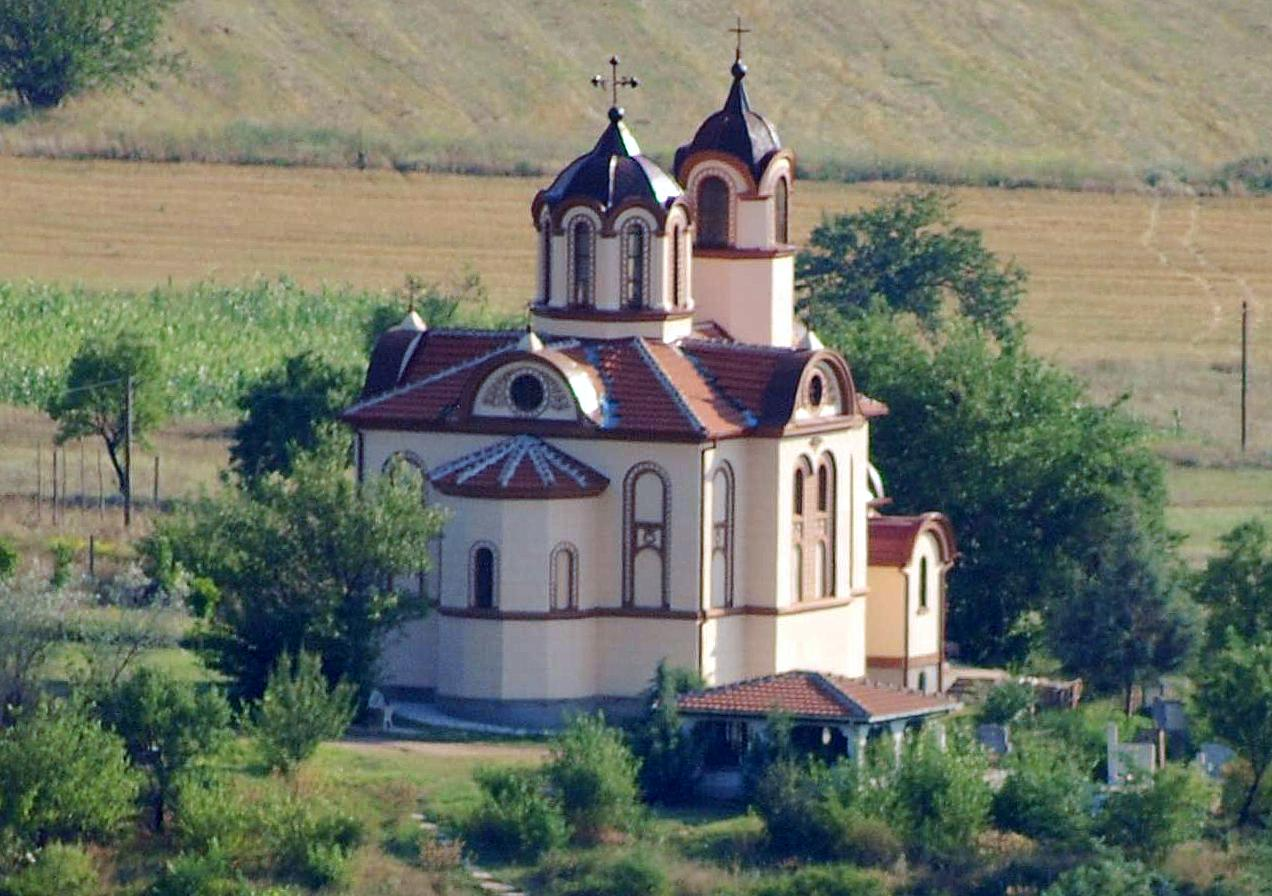
Holy Trinity Church

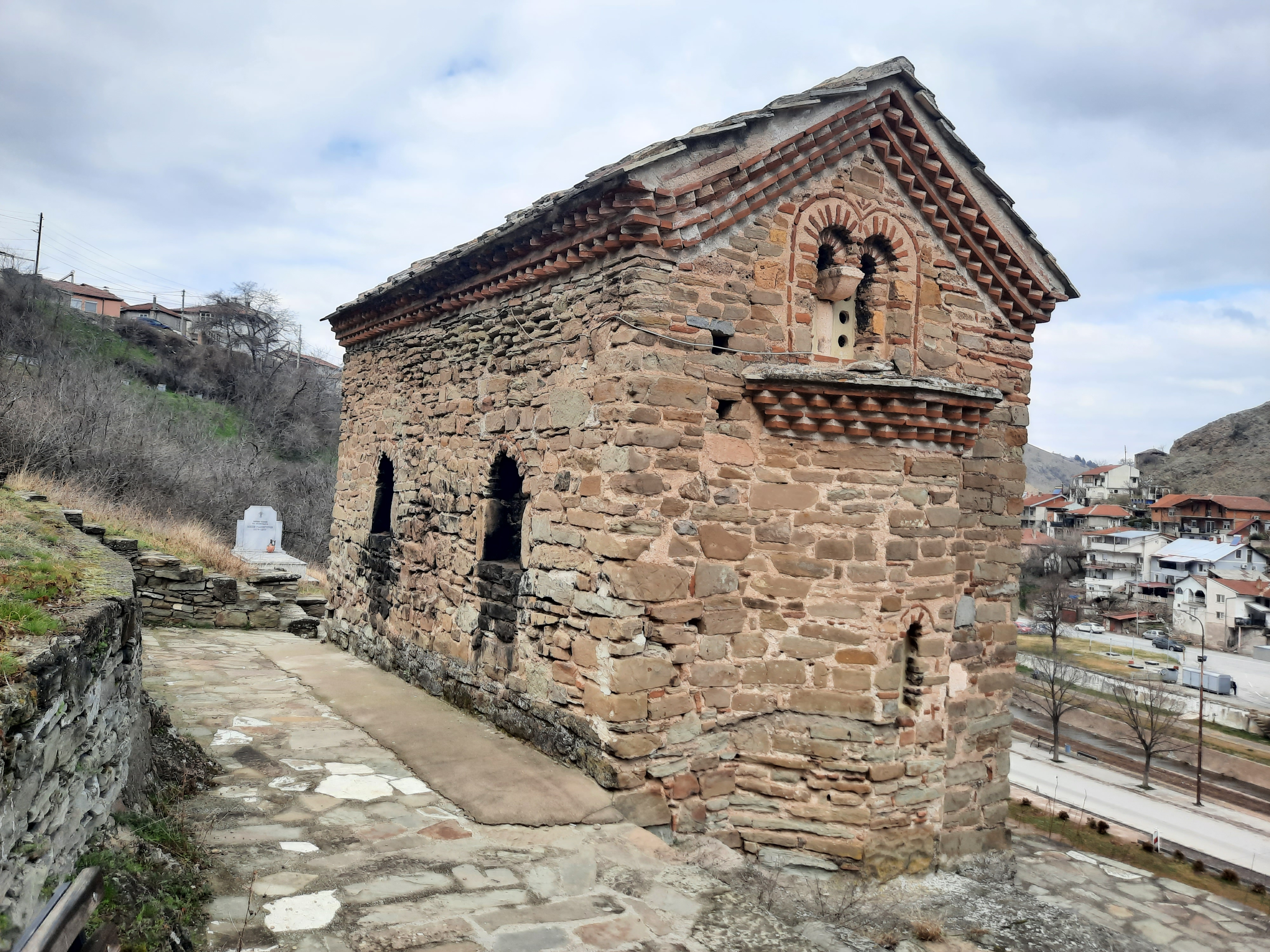
Ascension of Christ Church

There are six Christian Orthodox churches located within Novo Selo:

- Dormition of the Theotokos Church – the main church, completed in the 19th century. It is the work of Andreja Damjanov, and in it the canopy stands out. It has been declared as Monument of Culture.
- Ascension of Christ Church – built in 1369 by Duke Dimitrija. It has been declared as Monument of Culture;
- St. John the Baptist Church – a small one-nave church, built high on the rocks on the right side of the road Štip-Novo Selo. It has been declared a Monument of Culture;
- Shroud of the Theotokos Church – a cornerstone laid on August 1, 2012;
- St. Demetrius of Thessalonica Church – a cornerstone laid on May 17, 2014
- Holy Trinity Church – a cemetery church built from 1922 to 1925, when it was consecrated and it is not known by which hierarch. The church is a founding work of Todor Čepreganov from Štip. It has been declared a Monument of Culture.

== Sights ==
- House of Mihajlo Apostolski

== Notable people ==
- Todor Aleksandrov
- Mihajlo Apostolski
- Vančo Mihajlov
- Slaveyko Arsov
- Mihail Gogov
