= Jewish Cemetery, Štip =

Cemetery in Novo Selo, Štip, North Macedonia

Jewish Cemetery
- Еврејски гробишта Evrejski grobišta
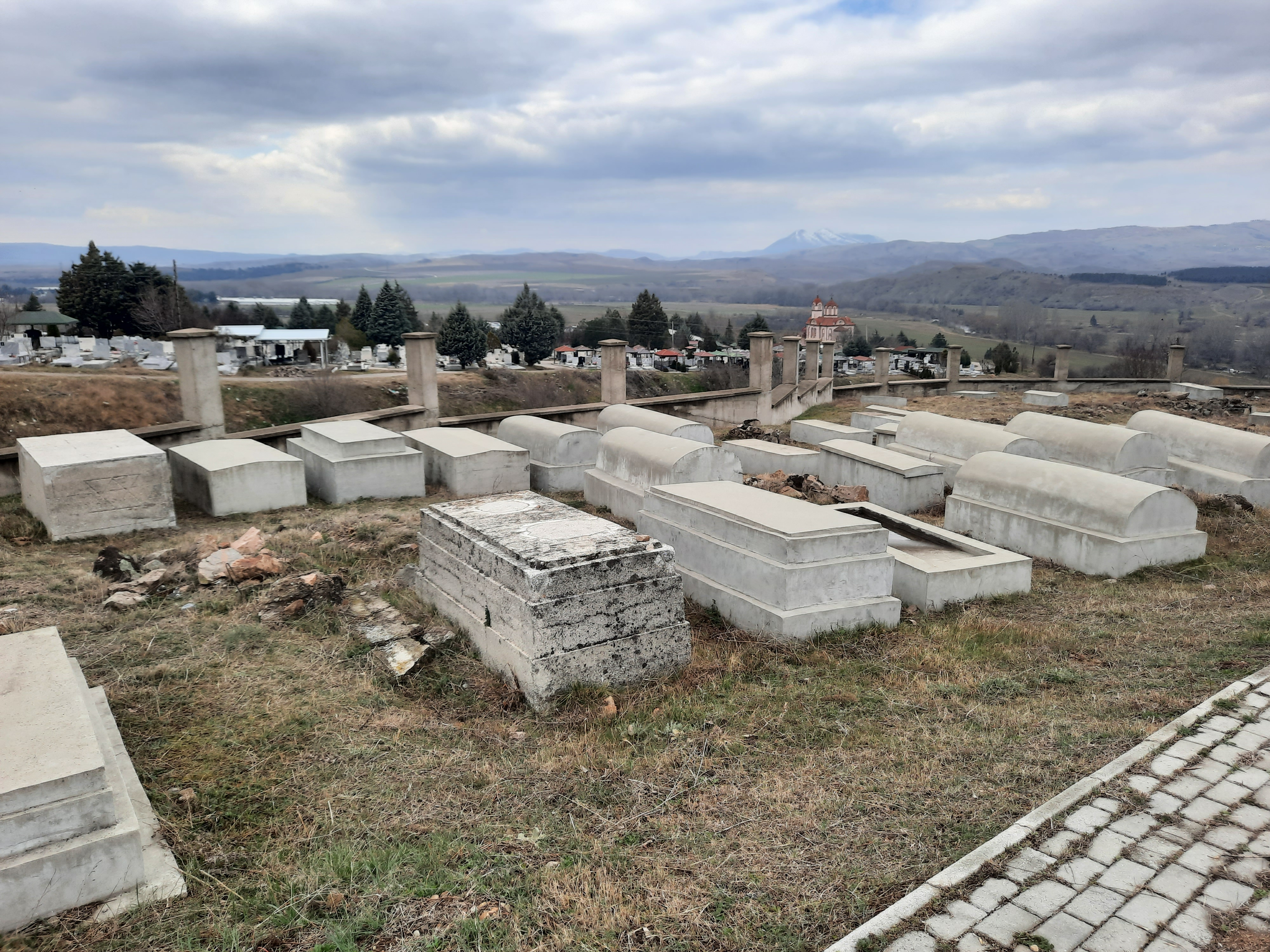
- Interactive map of Jewish Cemetery

Details
- Location: Novo Selo, Štip
- Country: North Macedonia
- Coordinates: 41°43′45.332″N 22°10′42.795″E
- Type: Jewish
- Owned by: Štip Museum

The Jewish Cemetery is the cemetery of the Jewish community in Štip, 5 km away from the town, i.e. in the outskirts of the suburb of Novo Selo, in North Macedonia. The cemetery is registered as a Cultural Heritage of North Macedonia.

== History ==
=== Background ===
The Jewish cemetery of Štip date back to before the arrival of the Spanish and Portuguese Jewish refugees. It can not be determined with certainty that the cemetery of the Jews from Štip has always been in the same place. The Romaniote Jewish community in Štip has existed since the beginning of the AD. The first written documents about the Jews in Štip date back to the 15th century, with the settlement of Spanish and Portuguese Jews who were persecuted from the Iberian Peninsula by King Ferdinand and Queen Isabella, refusing to accept Christianity.

It is believed that when Sultan Mehmed II conquered Constantinople in 1453 and moved his capital there, he began to inhabit that city. At that time, most of the Jewish population from Štip was moved to Constantinople. With the arrival of refugees from Spain and Portugal, the Jews in Štip strengthened their ranks. According to the jargon of the Jews of Štip, it could be said that most of the newcomers were from Portugal.

=== 17 century-Interwar period ===
According to the archeological excavations, the oldest tombs in the Jewish cemetery in Štip date from the 17th century, and from then until the 1940s they buried the dead in the same place. Access to them was very difficult, especially for people who carried the dead on a stretcher under Jewish law. There were no Jewish stonemasons in the town between the interwar period, so the teacher Menachem Mercado Zion drew the text of the tombstones in large and clear letters, and the stonemason Christians took over the inscriptions.

=== World War II ===
During World War II, with the deportation of the Macedonian Jews to the Treblinka extermination camp, the Jewish cemetery in Štip became devastated and demolished. The Bulgarian soldiers in that period collected all the stone memorial plaques and took them to the spa near the village Kežovica, about two kilometers away from the town of Štip, and from them then built the base of the pool itself. According to the lists in German and Bulgarian, 551 Jews from Štip were killed in Treblinka.

=== 21st Century ===
In September 2009, the Štip Museum started with the renovation of the Jewish Cemetery. According to Zoran Čitkušev, the then director of the museum in Štip, it was planned to renovate and conserve the graves. At the same time, it was planned to arrange the cemetery itself, build an access road and install a fence wall. The renovation was carried out with funds from the Central Government, the Ministry of Culture and the Office for Protection of Cultural Heritage. On April 1, 2015, a memorandum for cooperation was signed between the Štip Municipality and the Ministry of Culture, with which in 2016 the protective wall of the cemetery was built and completed. Today, there are 120 Jewish tombstones in the cemetery, placed horizontally, according to the Jewish burial method.

== Gallery ==
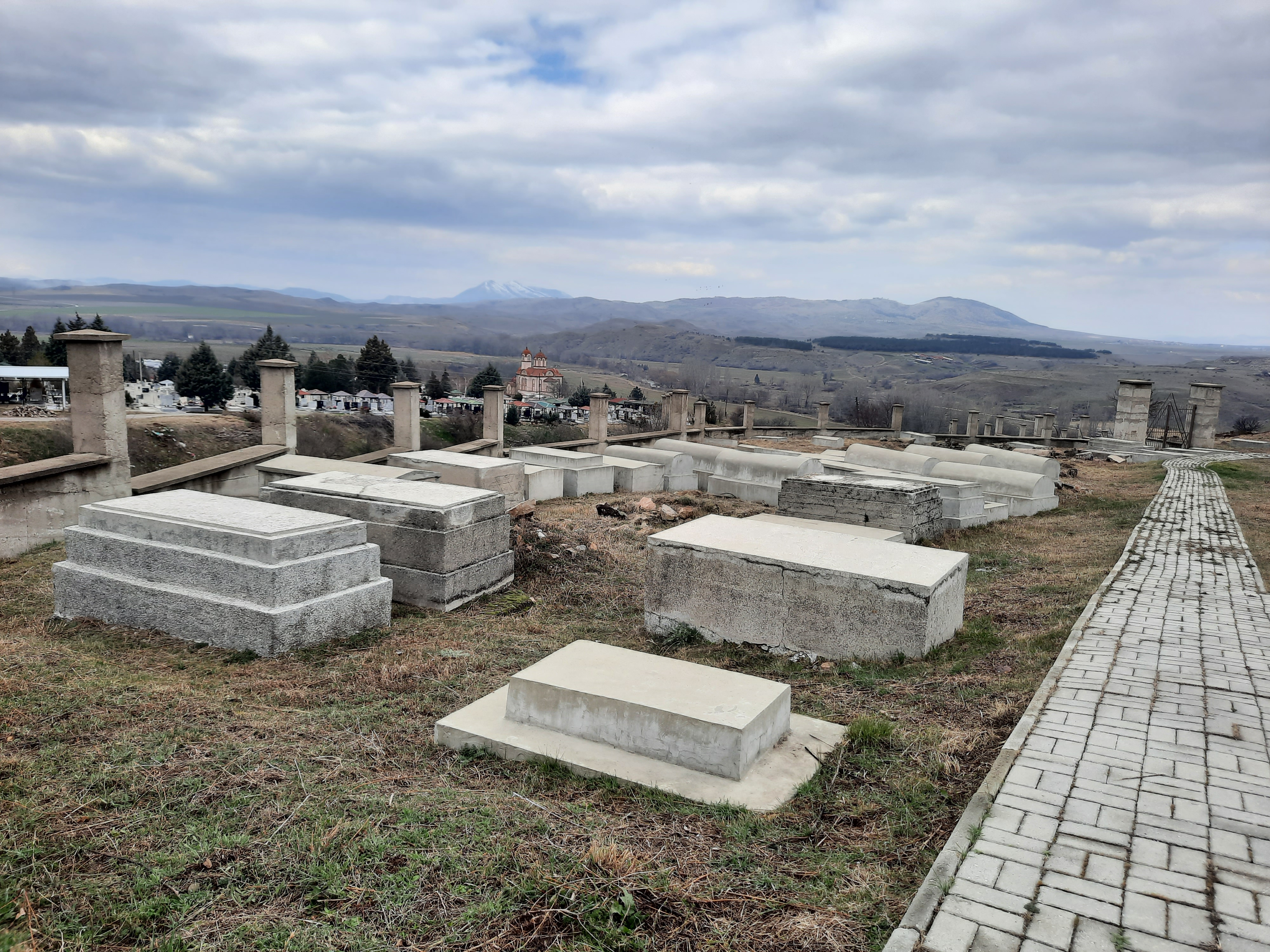

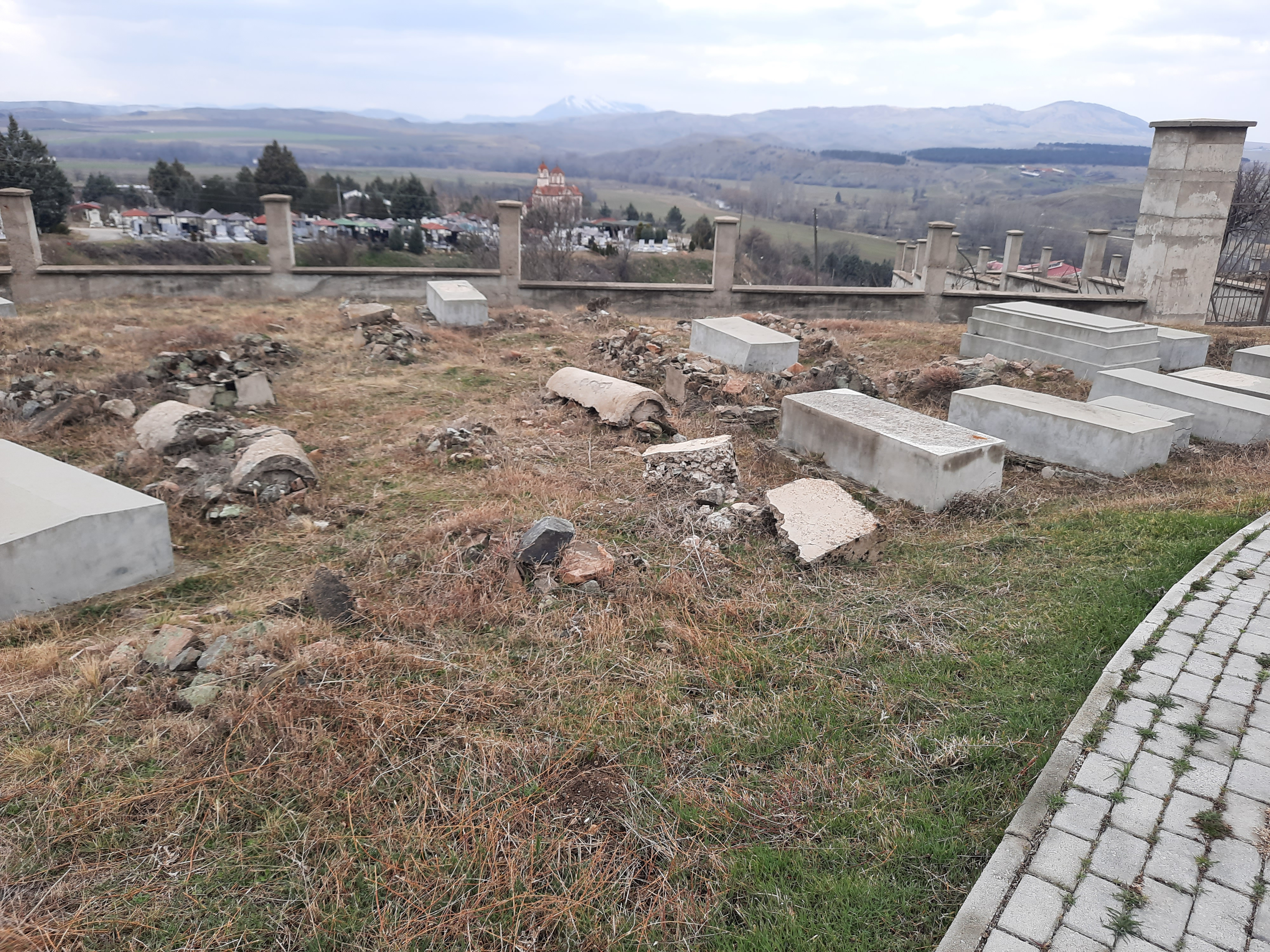

== See also ==
- Dormition of the Theotokos Church - the seat of Novo Selo Parish and a cultural heritage site
- Novo Selo School - the building of the former school and the present seat of the Rectorate of the Goce Delčev University. It is also a cultural heritage site
- Saint John the Baptist Church - a cultural heritage site
- Holy Trinity Church - the cemetery church and a cultural heritage site
- Ascension of Christ Church - a cultural heritage site
