= Novo Selo School =

Historical building in North Macedonia

- Новоселско училиште Novoselsko učilište (Macedonian)
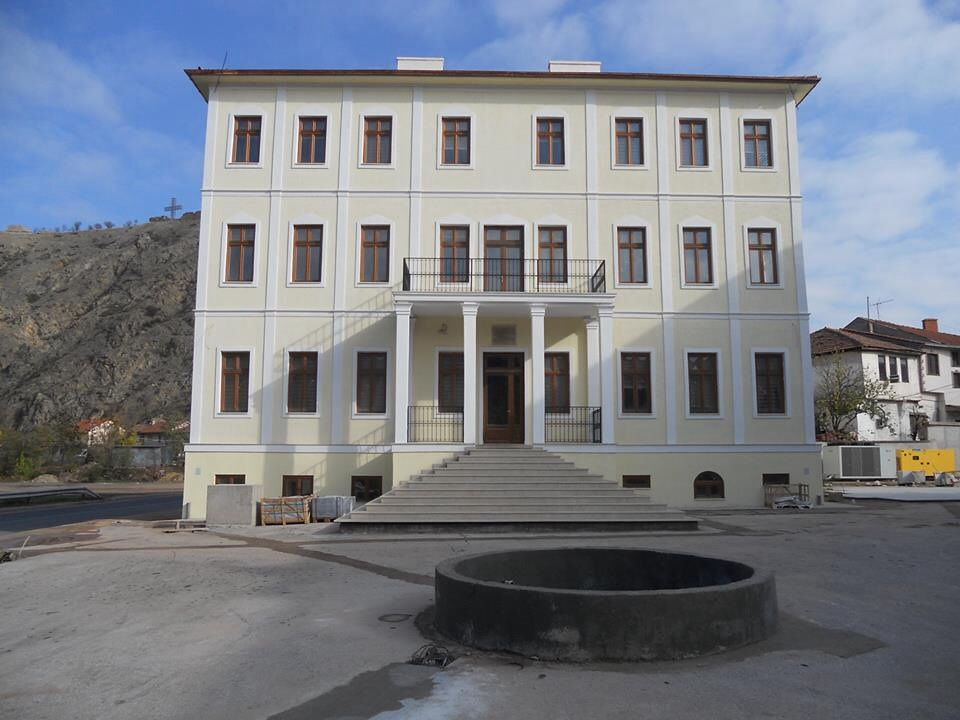
- Interactive map of Novo Selo School
- 41°44′10.8″N 22°10′56.6″E
- Type: Builging
- Location: Novo Selo, Štip, North Macedonia

Site notes
- Governing body: Goce Delčev University

The Novo Selo School is the building of the former Ottoman-era Bulgarian Exarchist school in Novo Selo, Štip, North Macedonia. The same building is now the seat to the Rectorate of the Goce Delčev University. The building is registered as a Cultural Heritage of North Macedonia. It is located in the yard of the Dormition of the Theotokos Church.

== History ==
=== As a school building ===
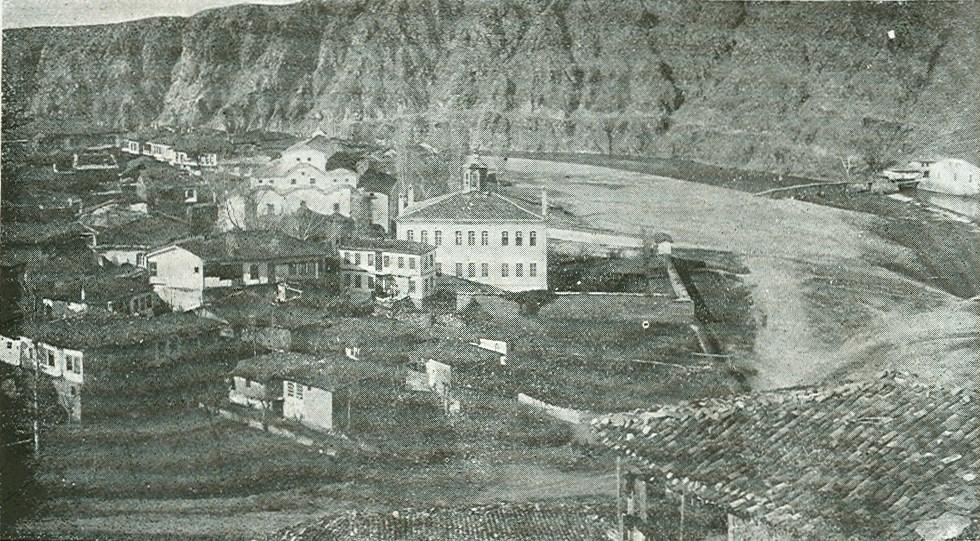
The school in the beginning of the 20th century.

The foundations of the building were laid in the 1877. The first school year was in 1882. The IMARO-revolutionary Gotse Delchev taught at the school for two years in the period 1894–1896. Dame Gruev, Petar Poparsov, Todor Aleksandrov and Ivan Mihaylov also taught at the Bulgarian school here. In 1912, the school employed 7 teachers who taught to 151 male and 100 female students. During the Balkan Wars, the school was turned into a hospital. During World War I, the building was used for military purposes.

During the Interwar Period, the school was a primary school from first to fourth grade. Before the start of the April War in 1941, the school was set on fire and almost completely destroyed, leaving only the foundations and some walls. Immediately after the arrival of the Bulgarian rule, construction works were carried out and the new version of the building was slightly different in appearance from the old building. Enrollment for students even began in September of that year.

In the period 1946–1949, the facility was seat of the Teachers School. Later, the Štip High School was situated here. In recent years, as a school institution, the facility was a school building within the "Vančo Prke" Elementary School.

=== As a rectorate ===
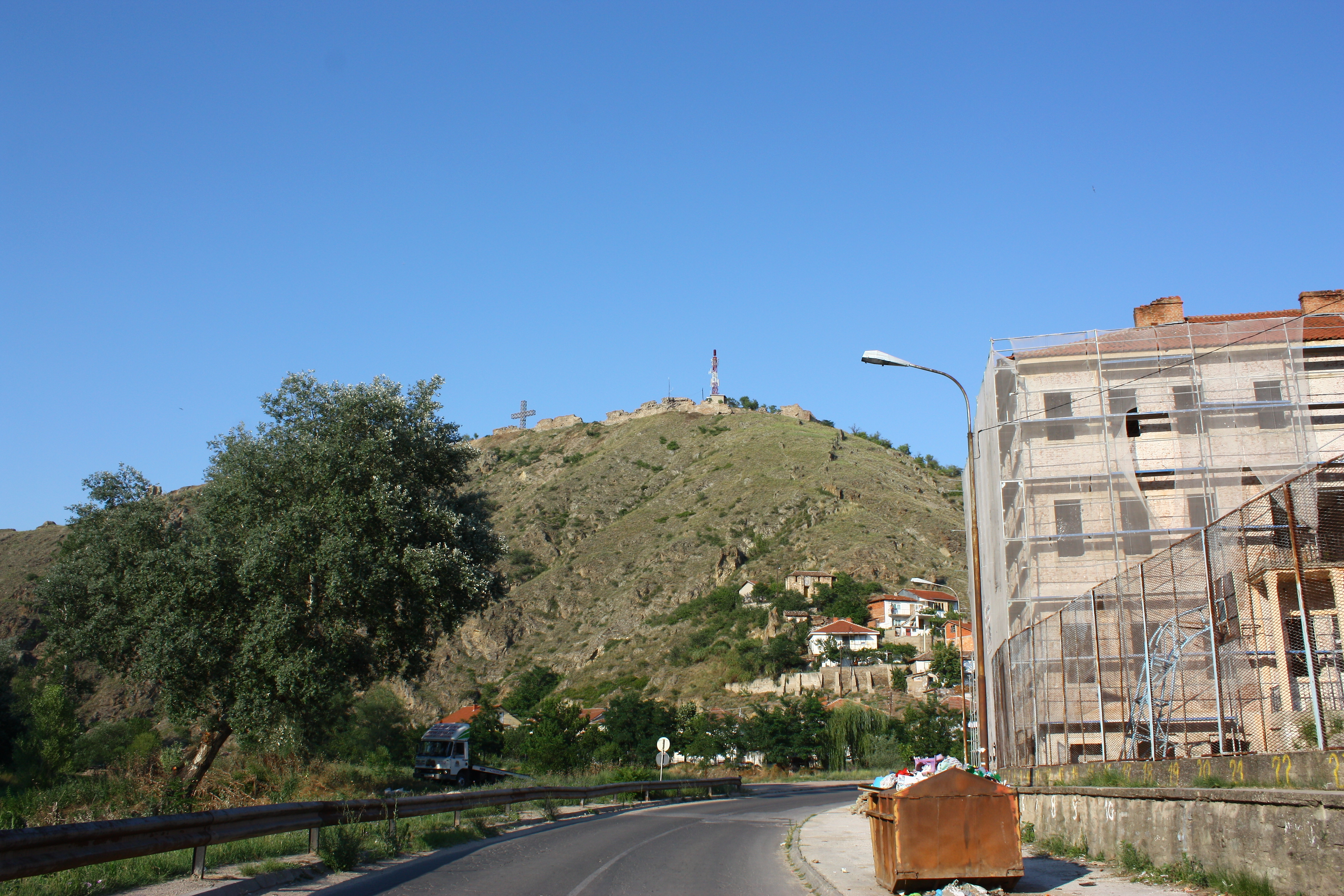
The building in 2010 during the renovation.

The building was renovated in order to become the seat of the Rectorate of the Goce Delčev University.

== See also ==
- Dormition of the Theotokos Church - the seat of Novo Selo Parish and a cultural heritage site
- Saint John the Baptist Church - a cultural heritage site
- Holy Trinity Church - the cemetery church and a cultural heritage site
- Ascension of Christ Church - a cultural heritage site

== Gallery ==
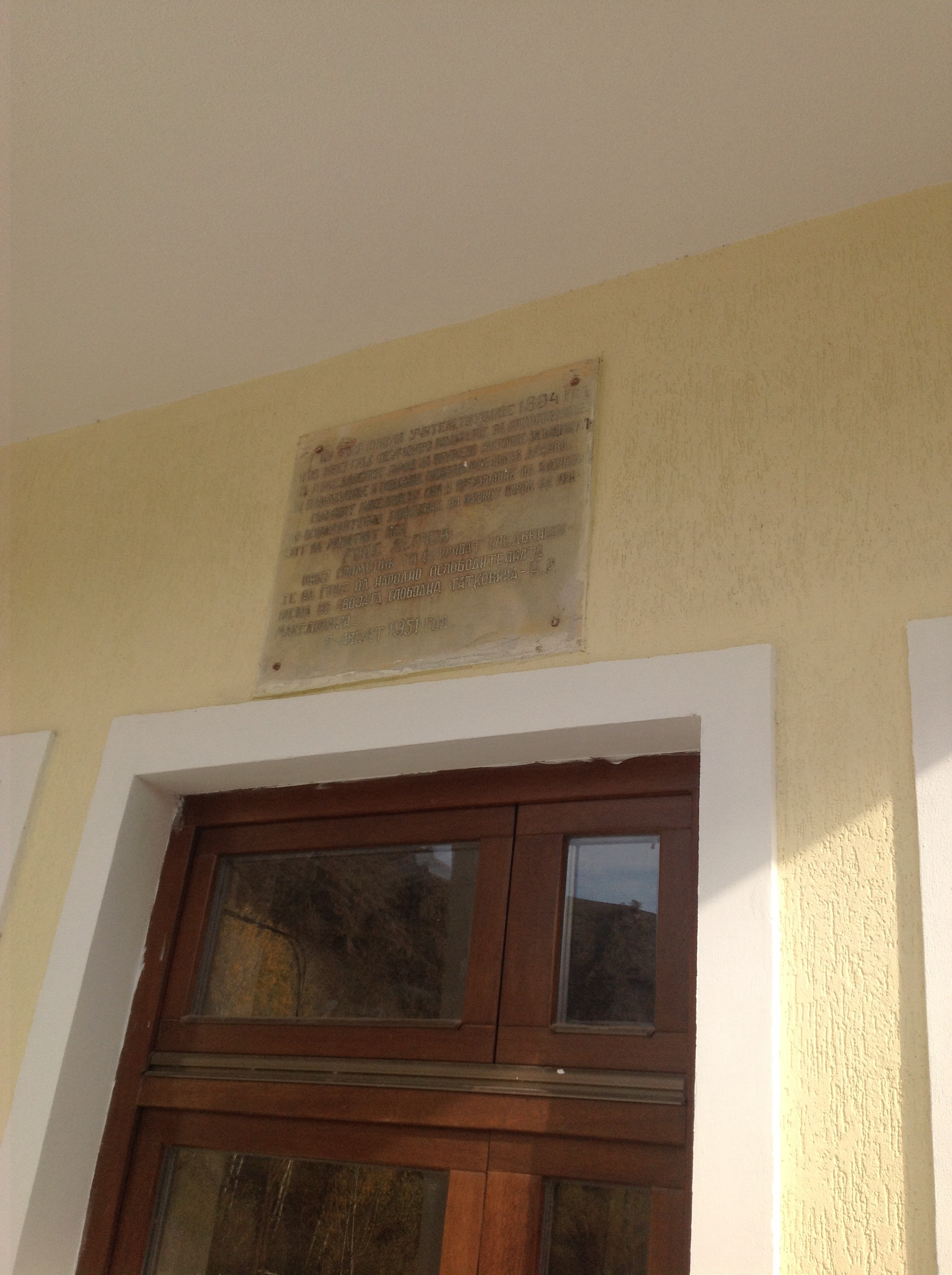

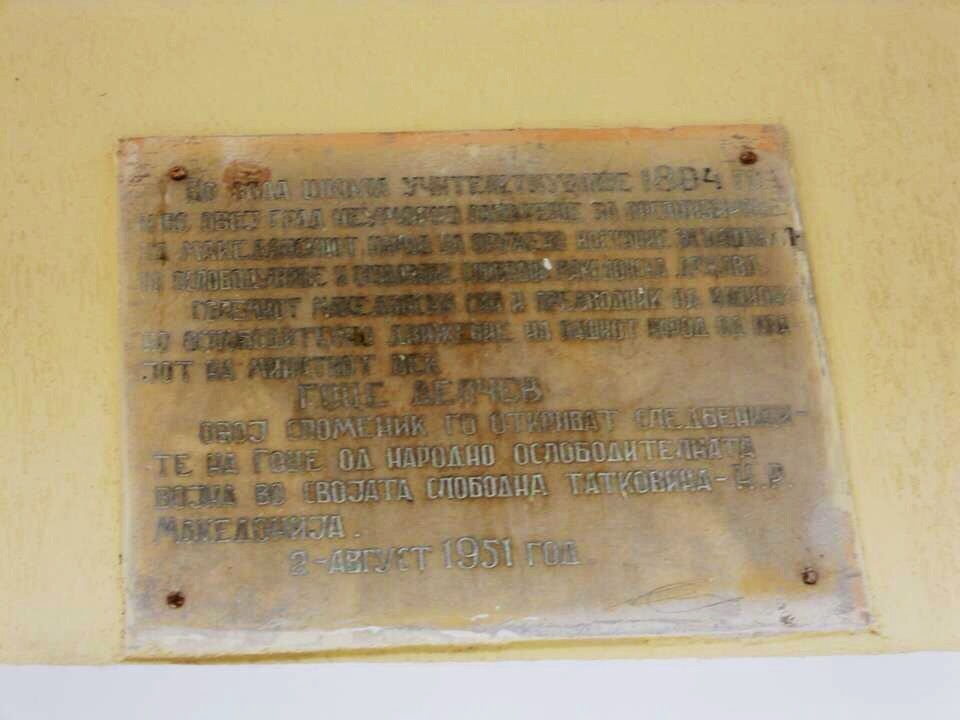
The memorial plaque honoring Goce Delčev, placed above the entrance door on August 2, 1951

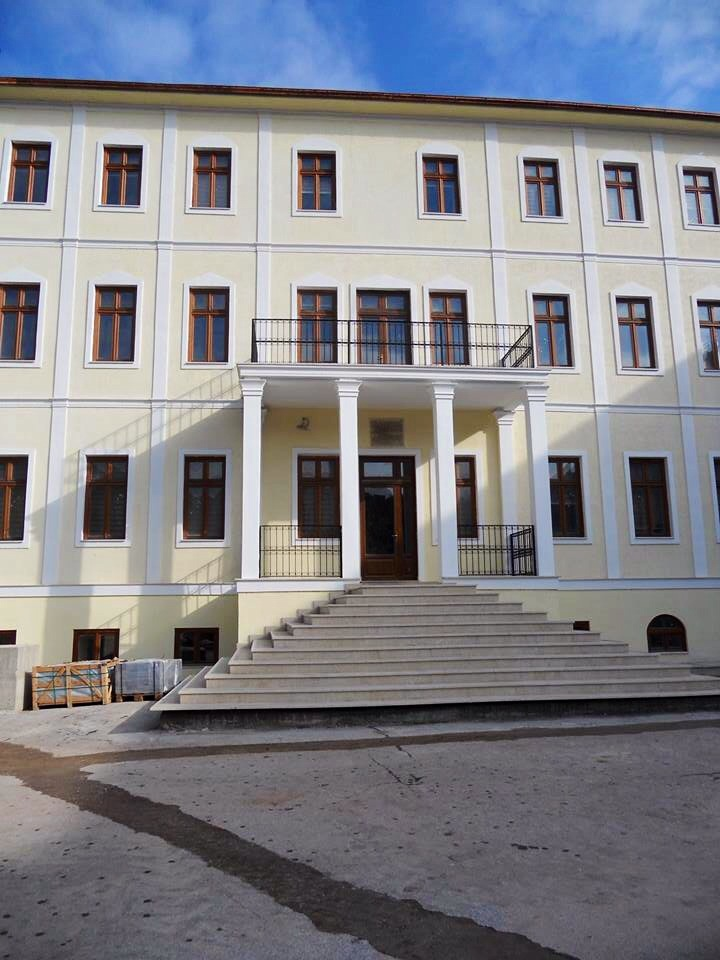
The entrance

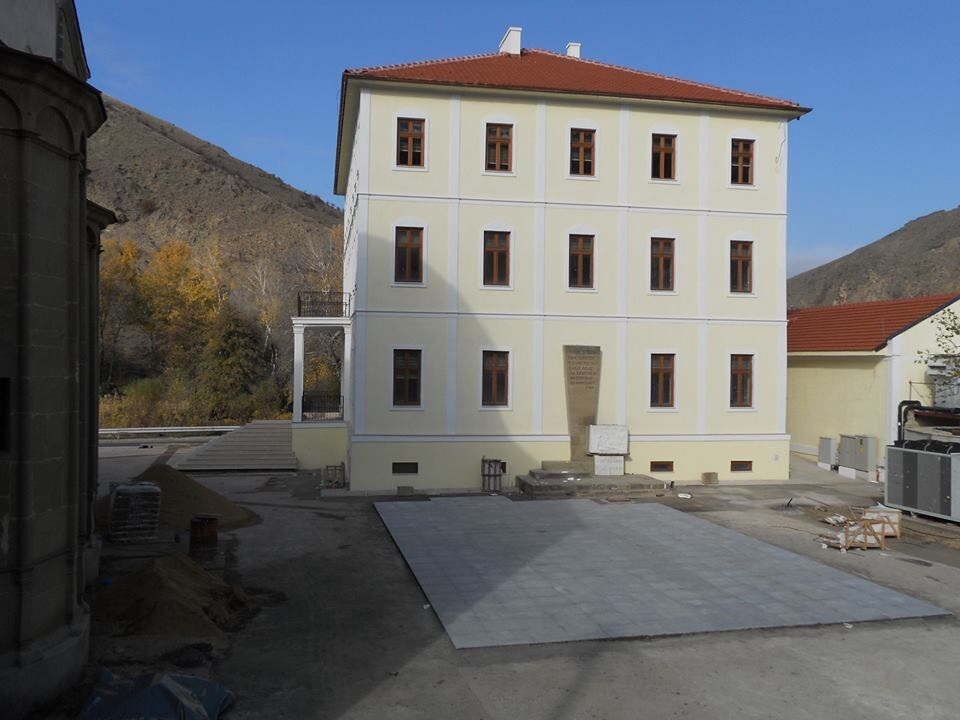
The southern wall
