= St. John the Baptist Church, Novo Selo, Štip =

St. John the Baptist Church
- Црква „Св. Јован Крстител“
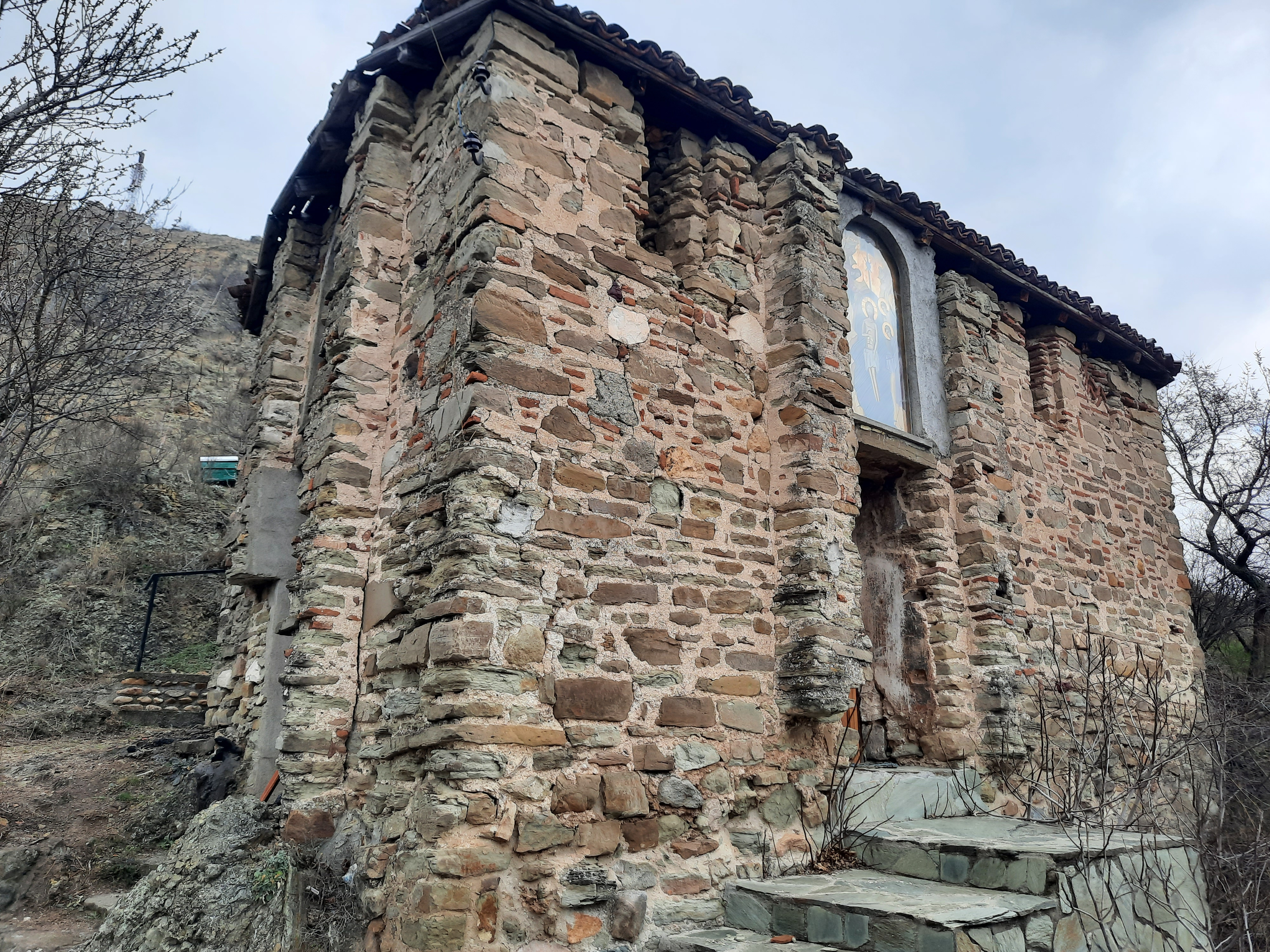
- The church in 2022
- St. John the Baptist Church
- 41.736833°N 22.184111°E
- Country: North Macedonia
- Denomination: Eastern Orthodox; Macedonian Orthodox Church
- Website: www.bregalnickaeparhija.org.mk

History
- Dedication: John the Baptist

Architecture
- Completed: 1350

Administration
- Diocese: Bregalnica Diocese
- Parish: Novo Selo Parish

The St. John the Baptist Church is a Macedonian Orthodox church in the neighbourhood of Novo Selo, Štip. The church is registered as a Cultural Heritage site of North Macedonia.

The church is located high on the rocks in the suburb of Novo Selo, on the right bank of the river Otinja.

== History ==
The church was built in 1350 with the support of Jovan Probištipovikj (Jovan of Probištip) at a time when the land was owned by the despot Jovan Oliver.

== Features ==
It is a small single-nave church without a dome. The south façade is decorated with lizens, and above the west entrance there is a profiled niche similar to the one on the south side, in which there is a fresco by the patron John the Baptist. Only insignificant fragments of the frescoes are preserved - the representation of Saints Constantine and Helena on the southern wall.

== Gallery ==
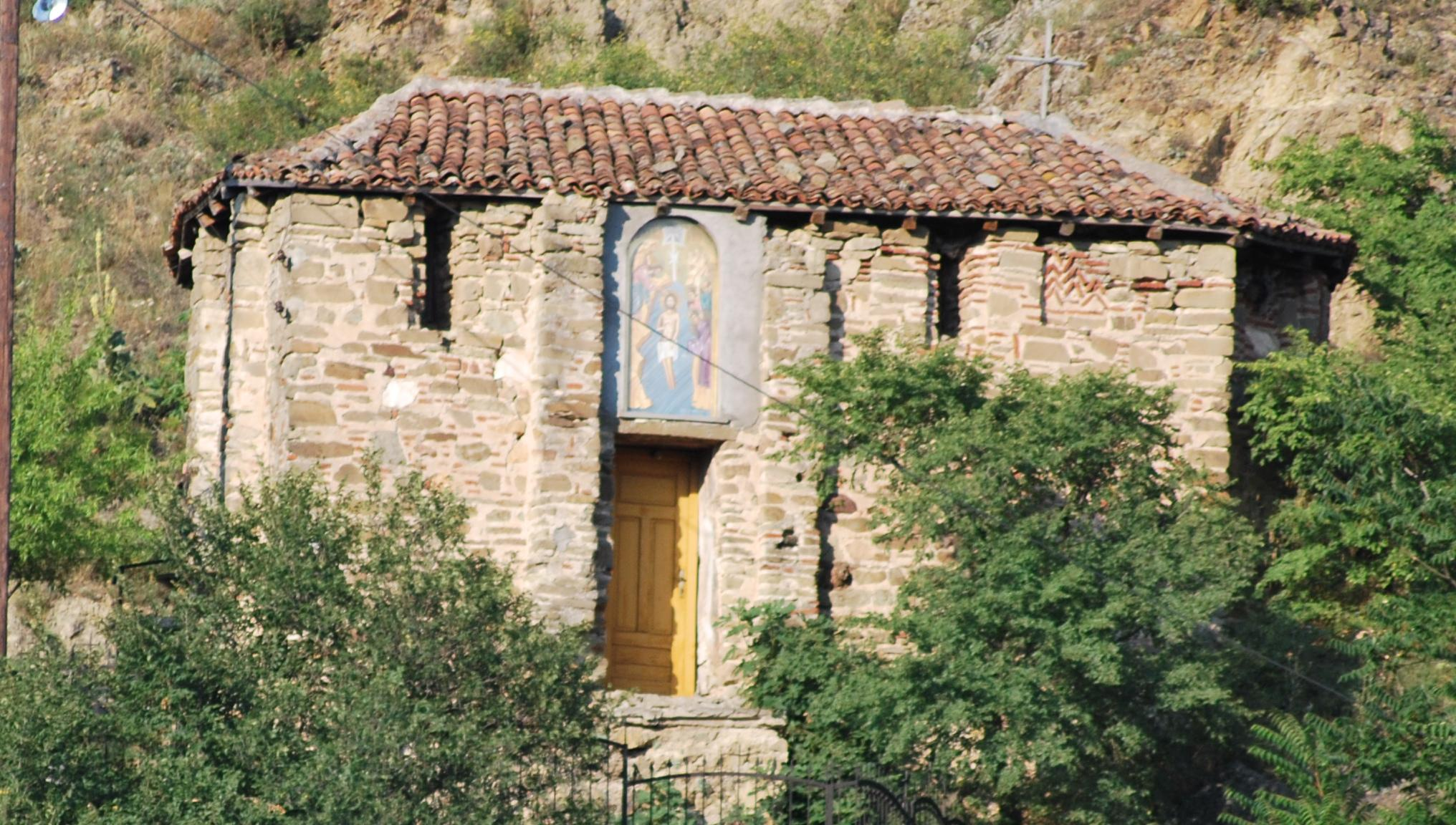
The church seen from the south

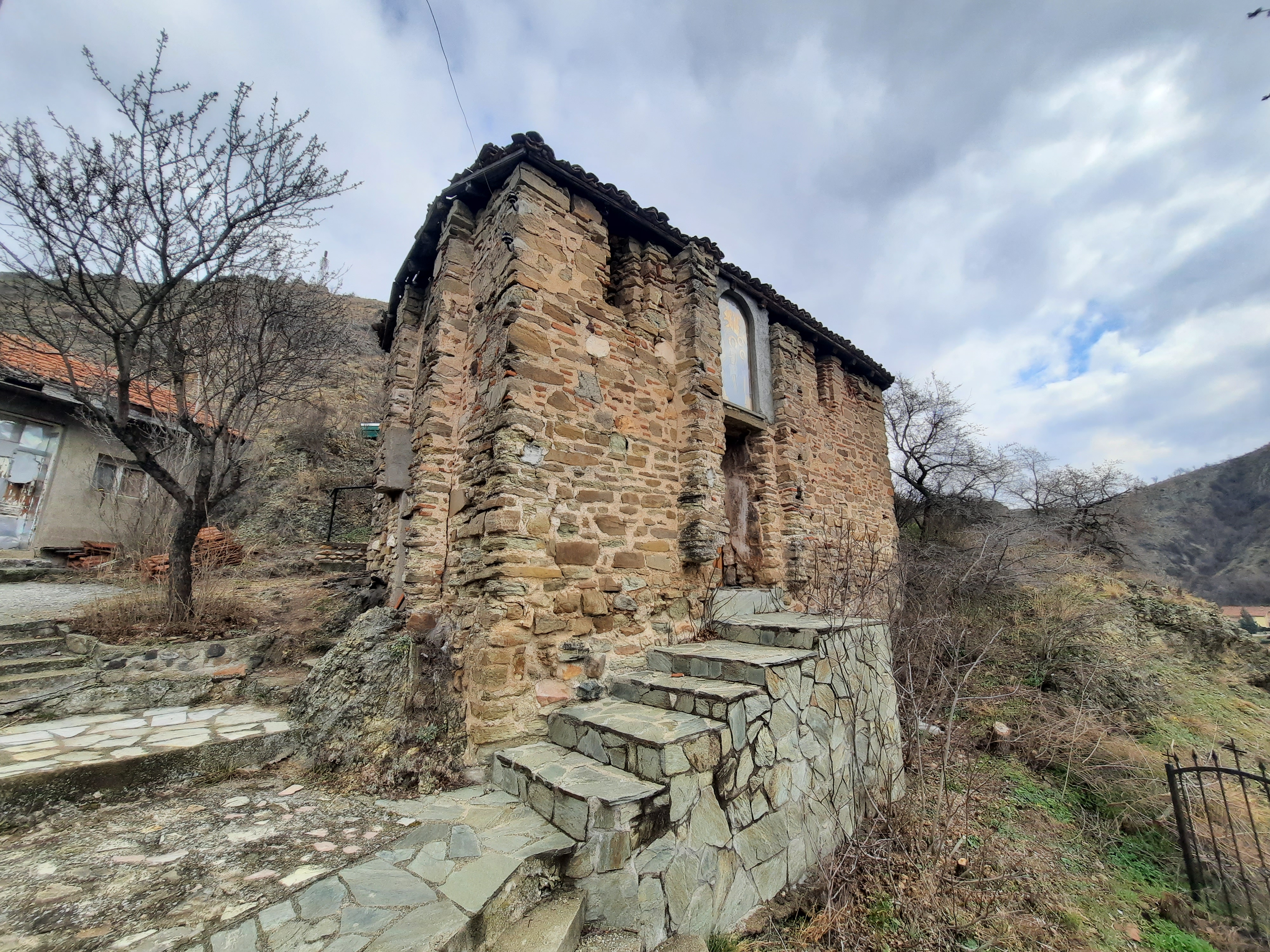
The church seen from the south-west

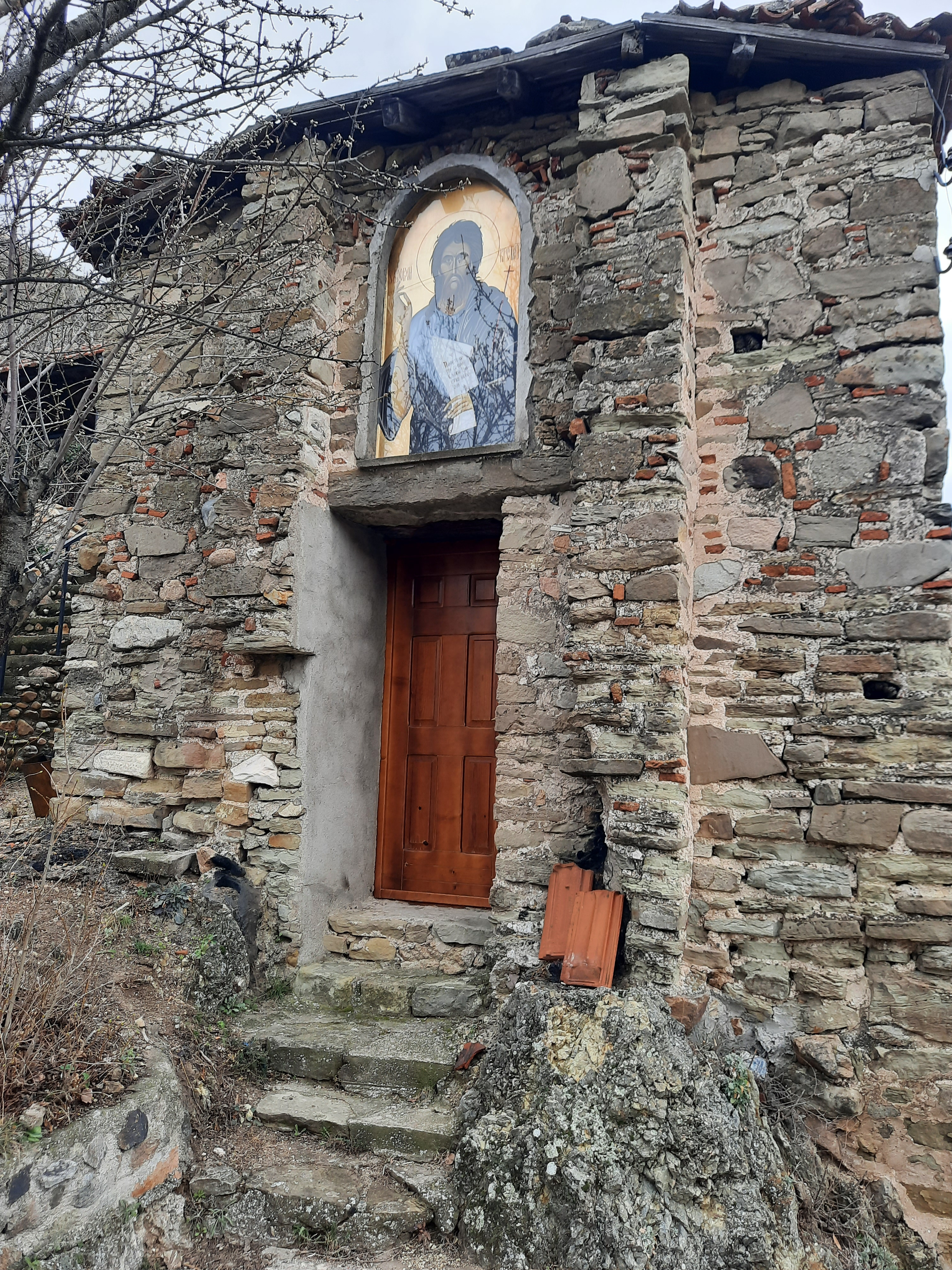
The western entrance

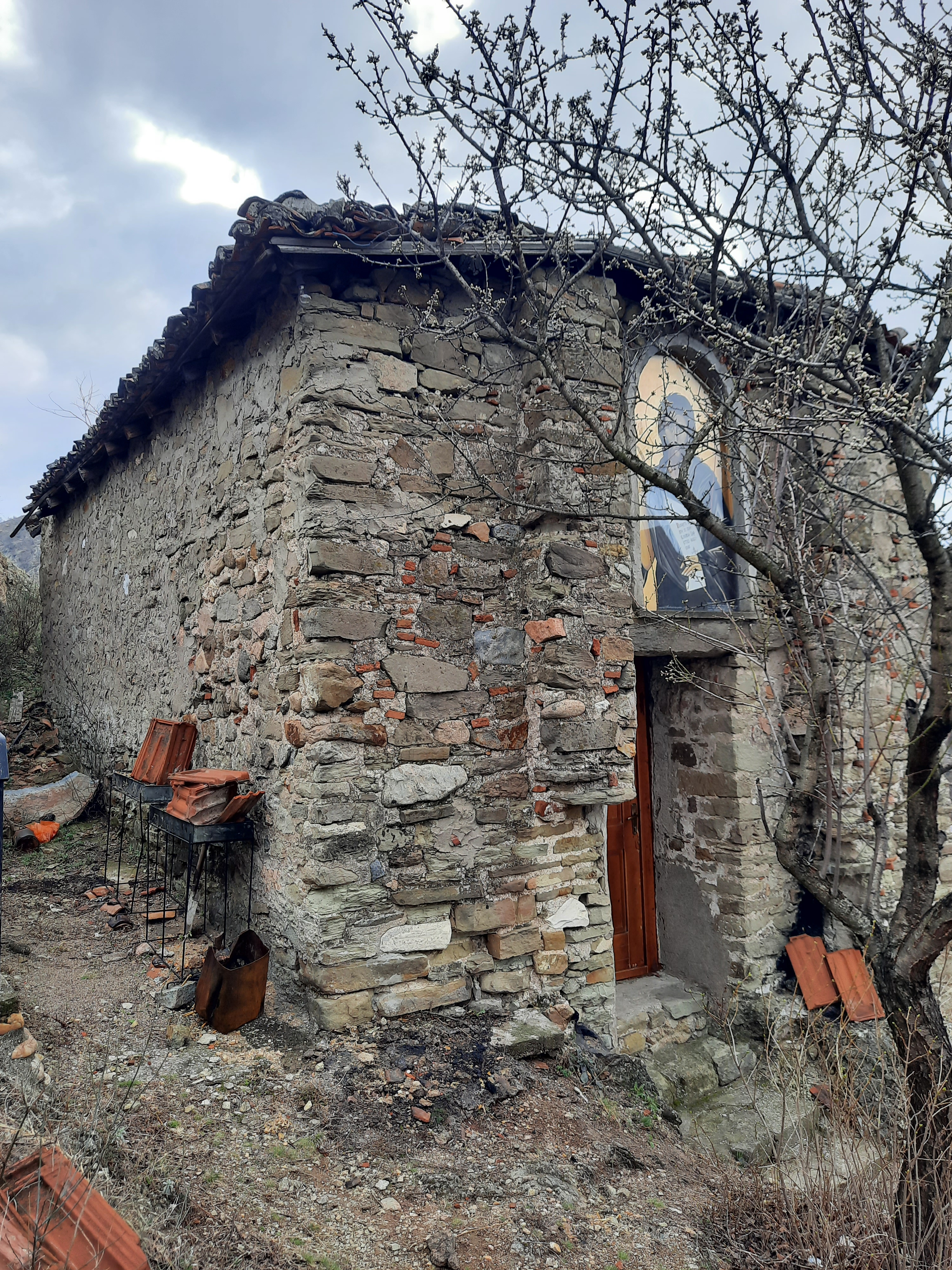
The western entrance

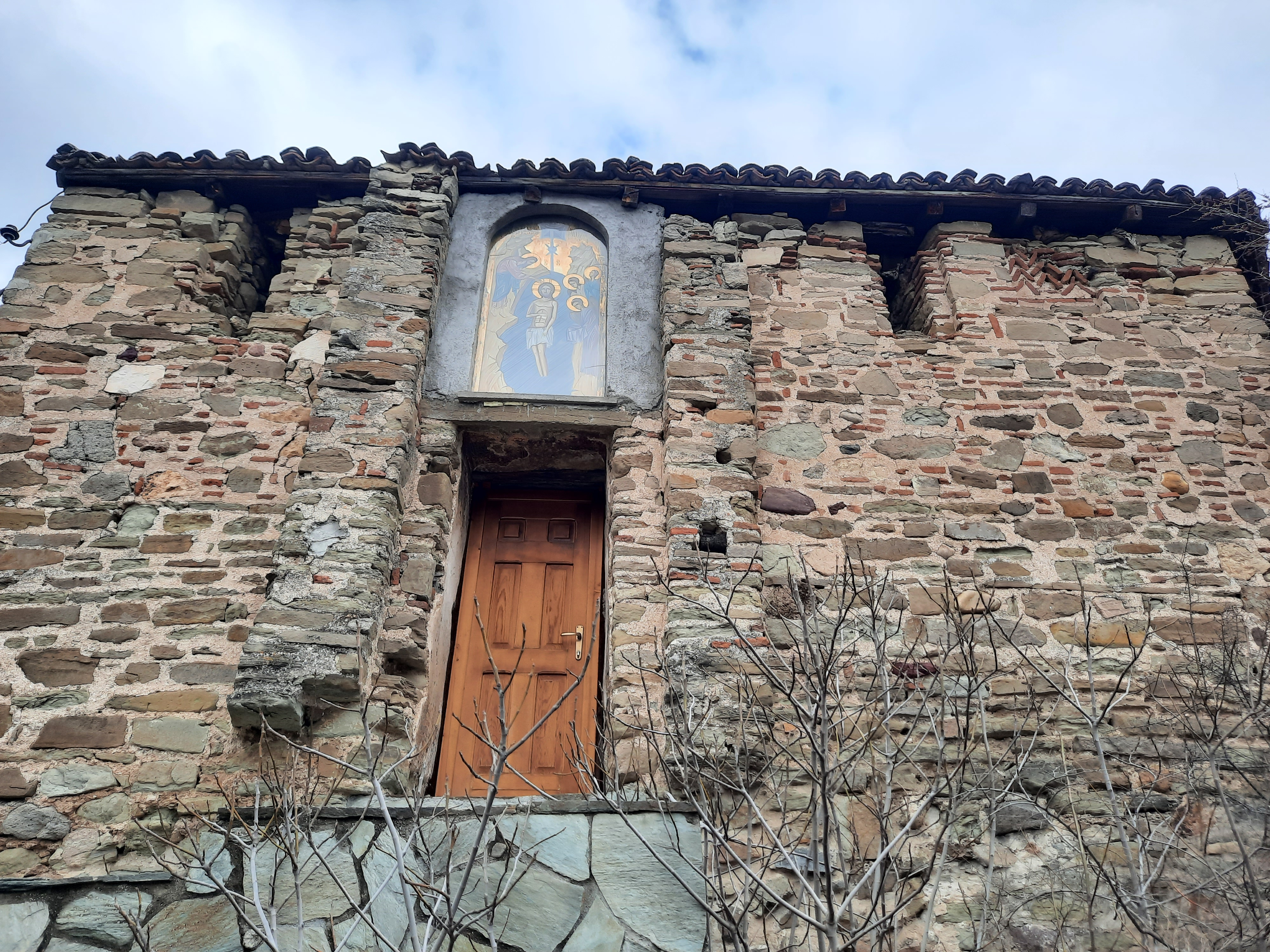
The southern entrance

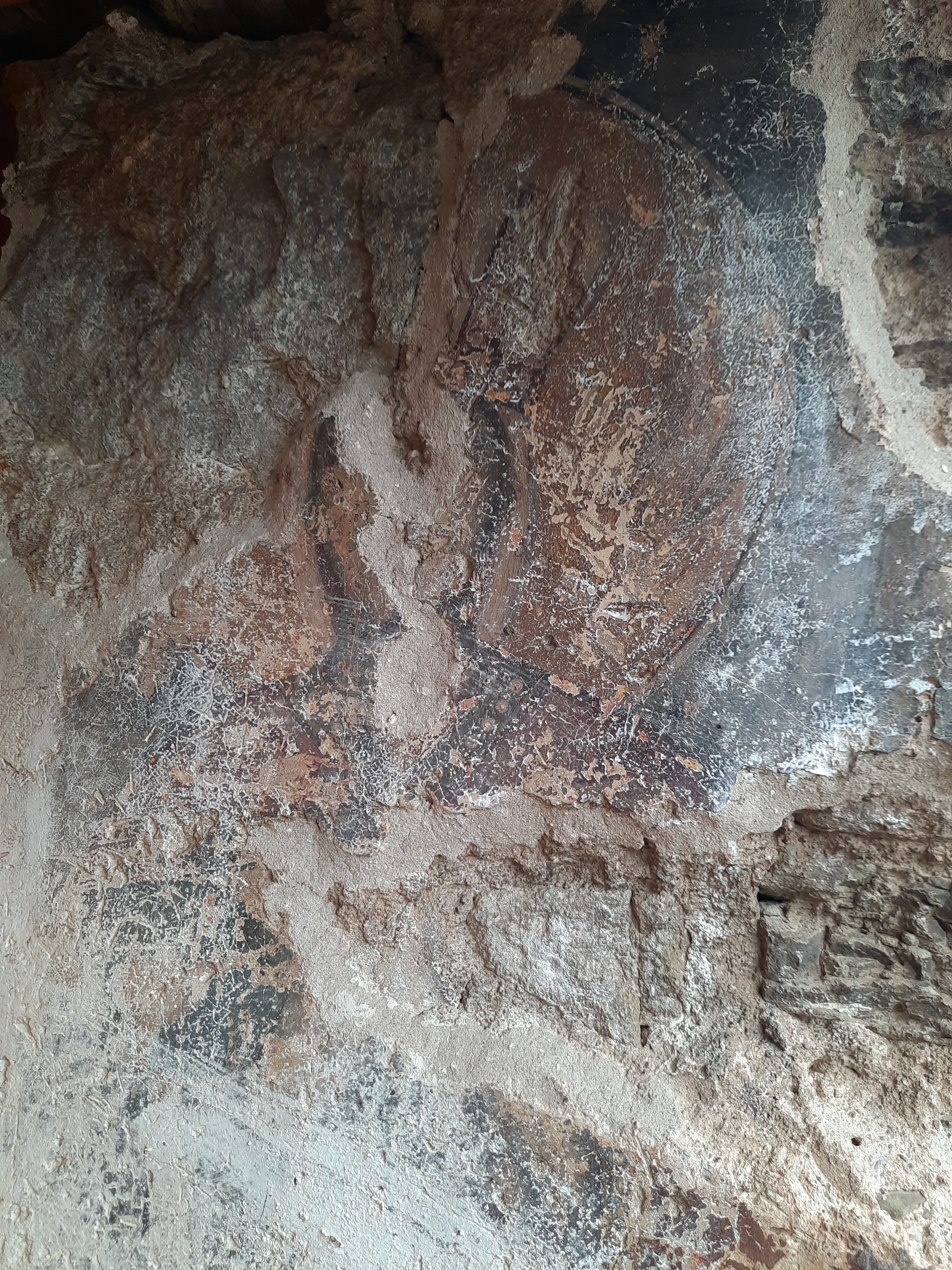
A frescoe on the right site of the southern entrance (probably the one of Constantine)

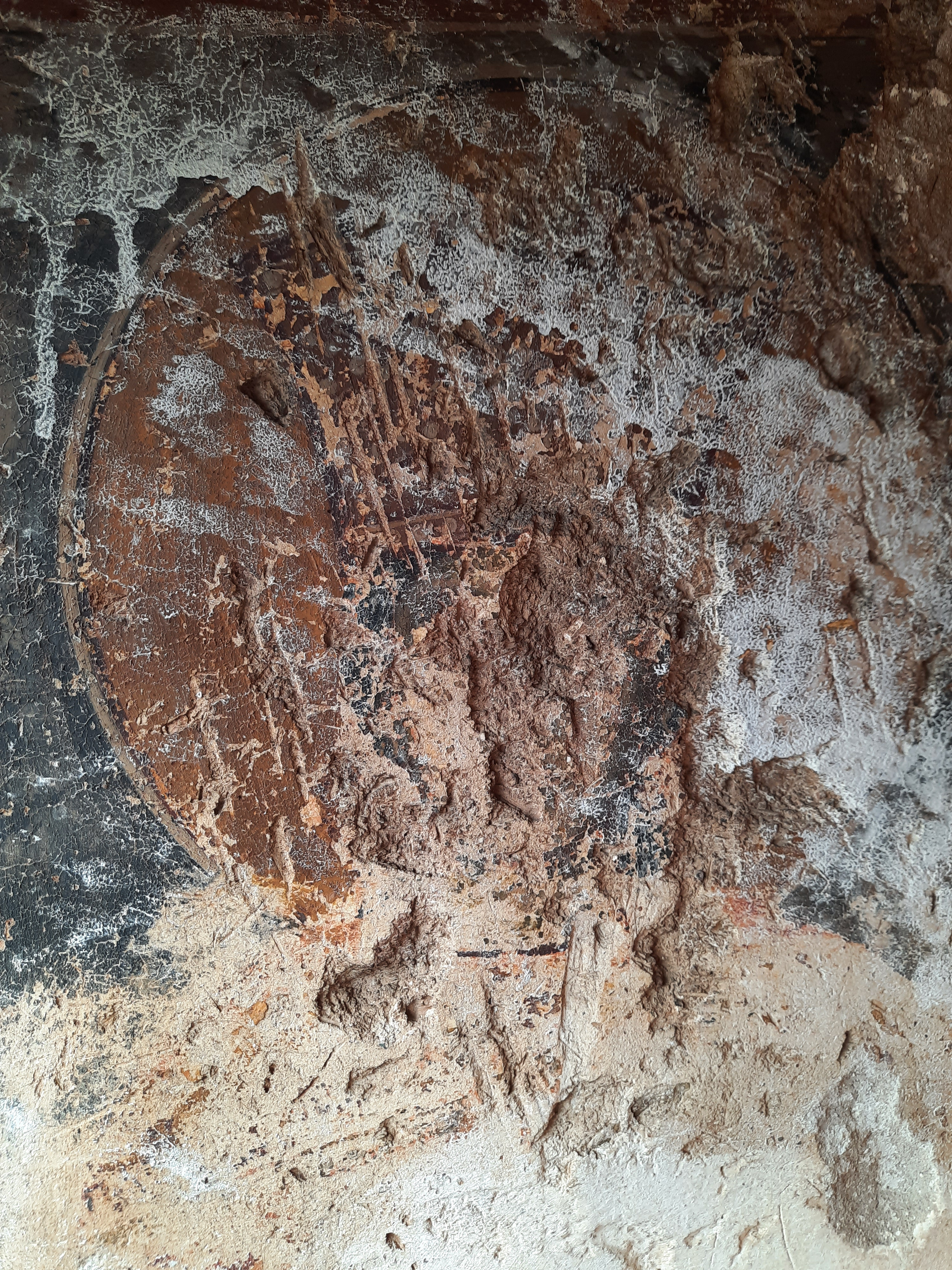
A frescoe on the left site of the southern entrance (probably the one of Helena)

== See also ==
- Dormition of the Theotokos Church - the seat of Novo Selo Parish and a cultural heritage site
- Ascension of Christ Church - a cultural heritage site
- Holy Trinity Church - the cemetery church and a cultural heritage site
- Novo Selo School - the building of the former school and the present seat of the Rectorate of the Goce Delčev University. It is also a cultural heritage site
