= Ascension of Christ Church, Novo Selo, Štip =

Ascension of Christ Church
- Црква „Вознесение Христово“
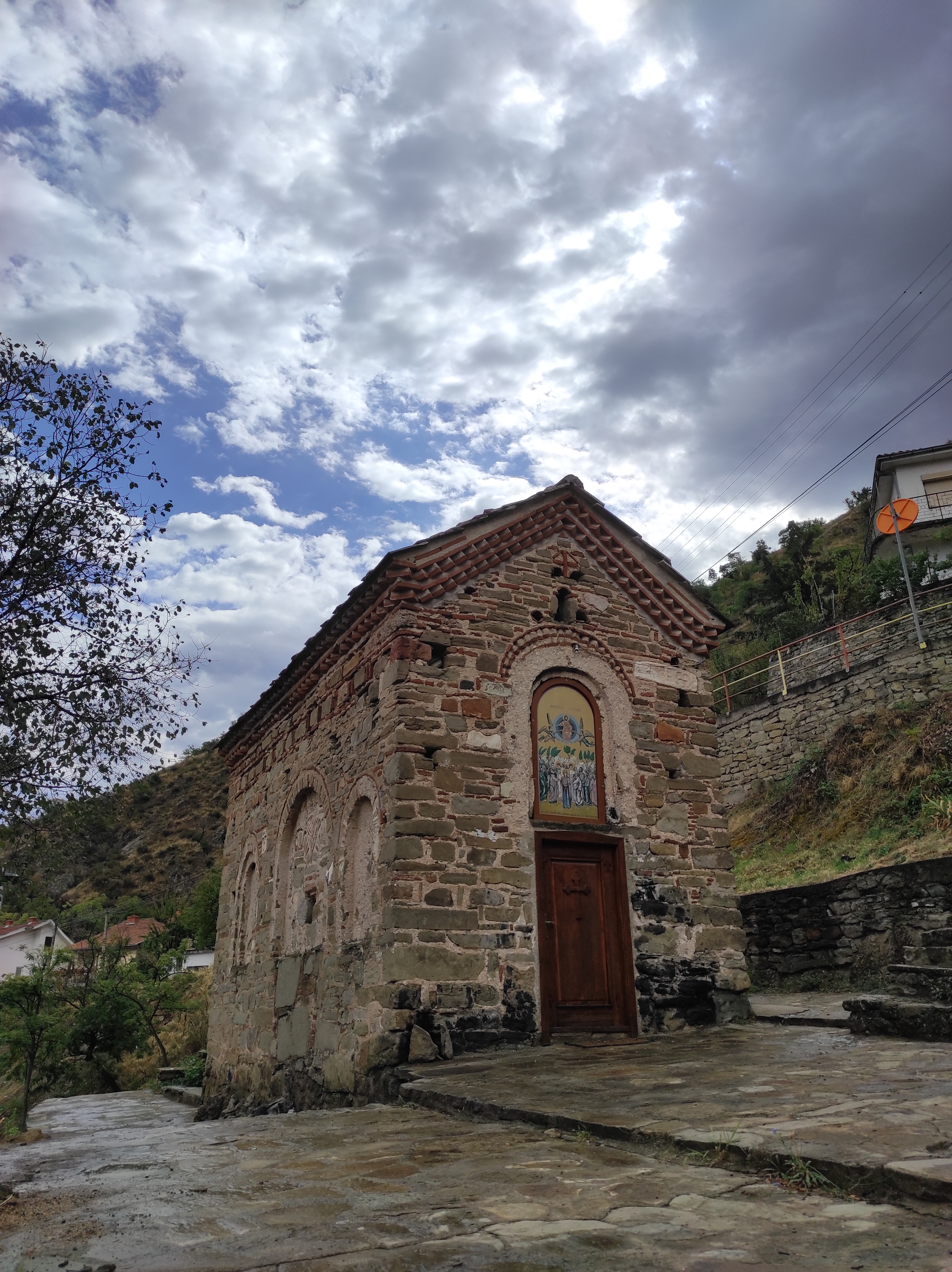
- The church in 2021
- Ascension of Christ Church
- 41.734779°N 22.184804°E
- Country: North Macedonia
- Denomination: Eastern Orthodox; Macedonian Orthodox Church
- Website: www.bregalnickaeparhija.org.mk

History
- Dedication: Ascension of Jesus

Architecture
- Completed: 1369

Administration
- Diocese: Bregalnica Diocese
- Parish: Novo Selo Parish

The Ascension of Christ Church is a Macedonian Orthodox church in the neighbourhood of Novo Selo, Štip. The church is registered as a Cultural Heritage site of North Macedonia.

The church is located on the left side of the river Otinja, in the eastern part of Novo Selo, 1 km from the center of Štip which is located to the east.

== Features ==
It is a one-nave temple that is considered to have been built by Duke Dimitrija in 1369. The original frescoes of the church have not been preserved. According to the Greek inscription, it was repainted in 1601 by the painter Jovan in the style of the school of Linotopi. This second fresco painting lasted from May 13 to July 6, 1601, and the founding inscription mentions Bishop Rufim, the priest Dojko and the founder Pavle Mutavdžija.

== Gallery ==
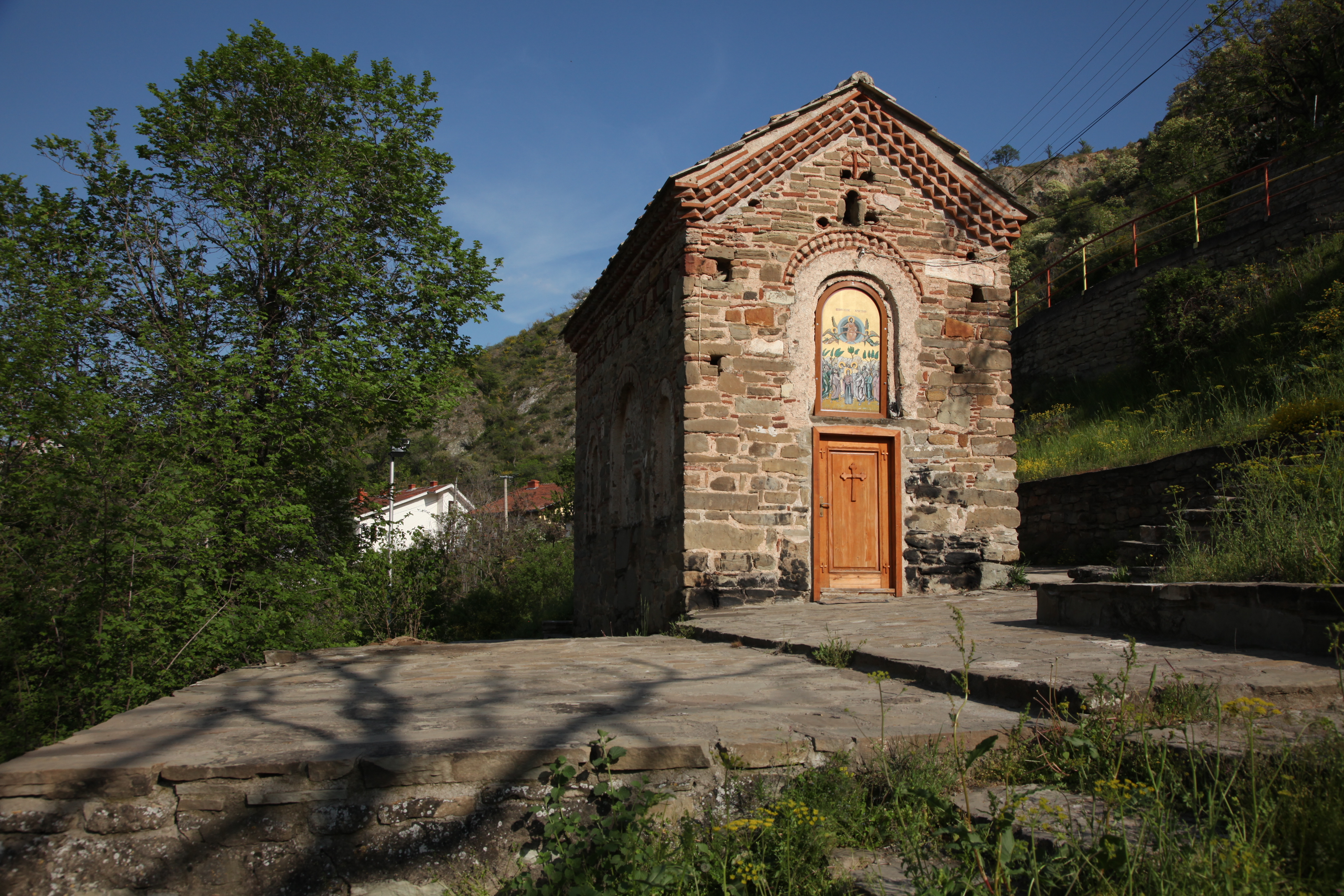
The church from a north-west view

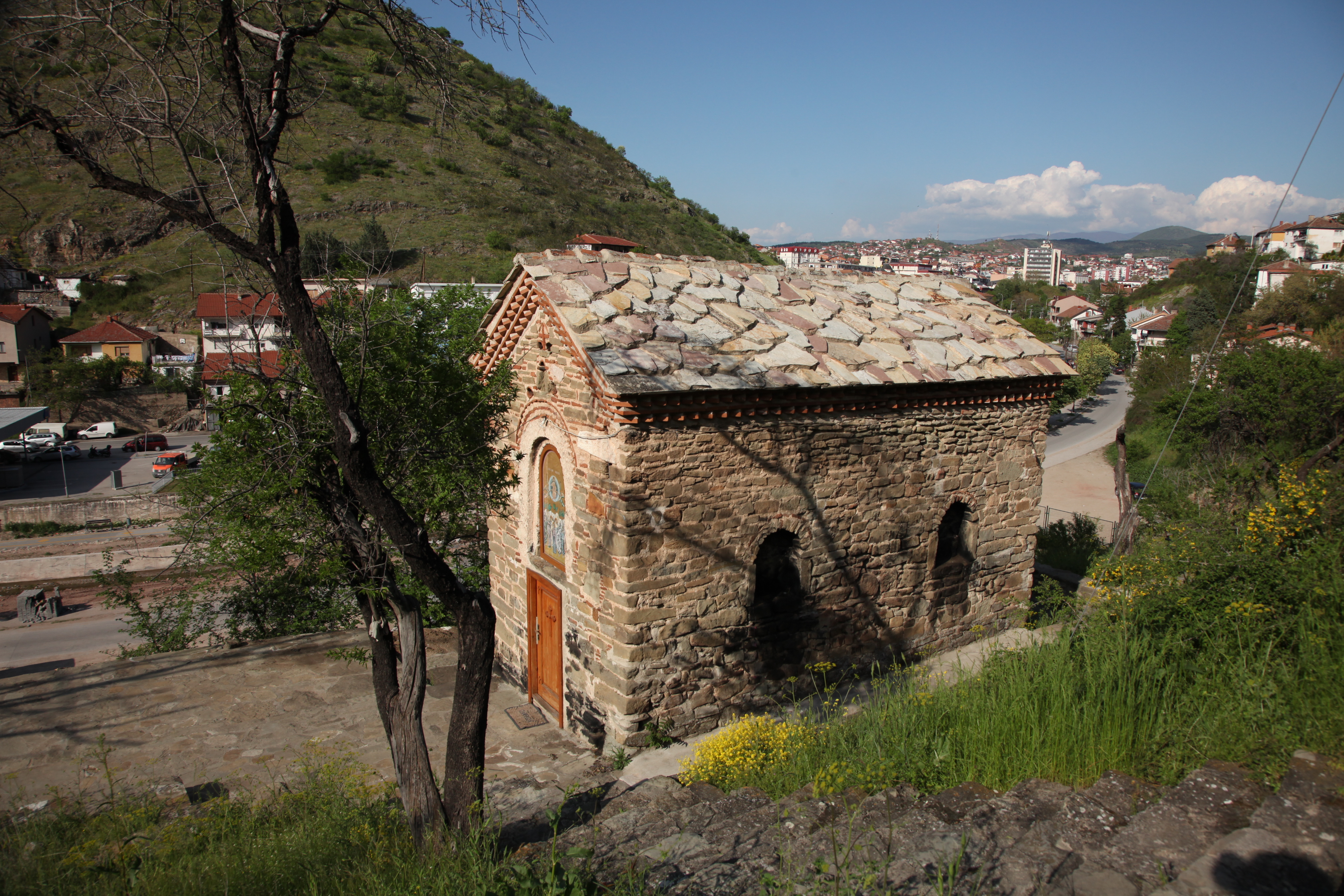
The church seen from the south (in the background, Štip is located)

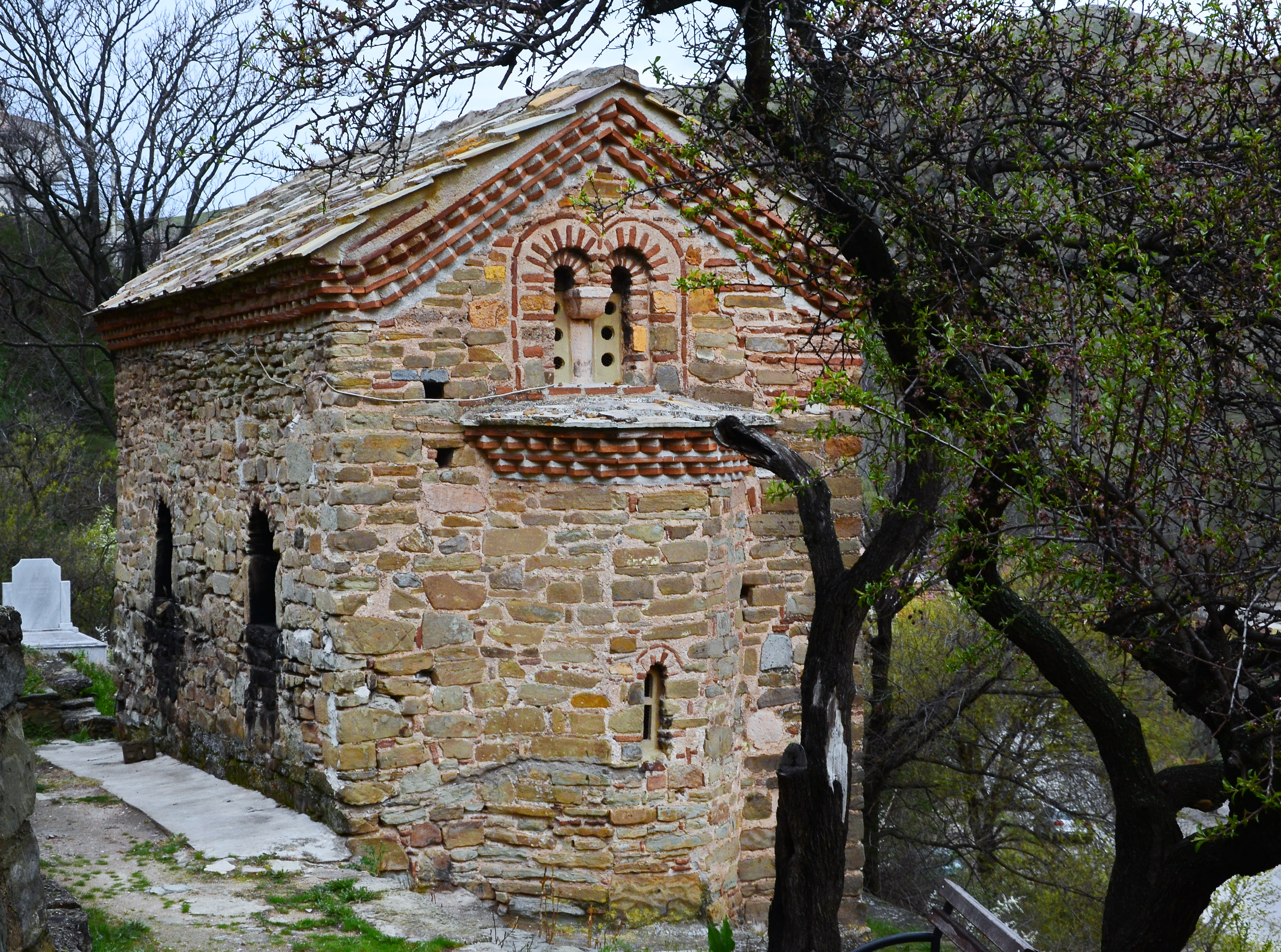
The apse 2021

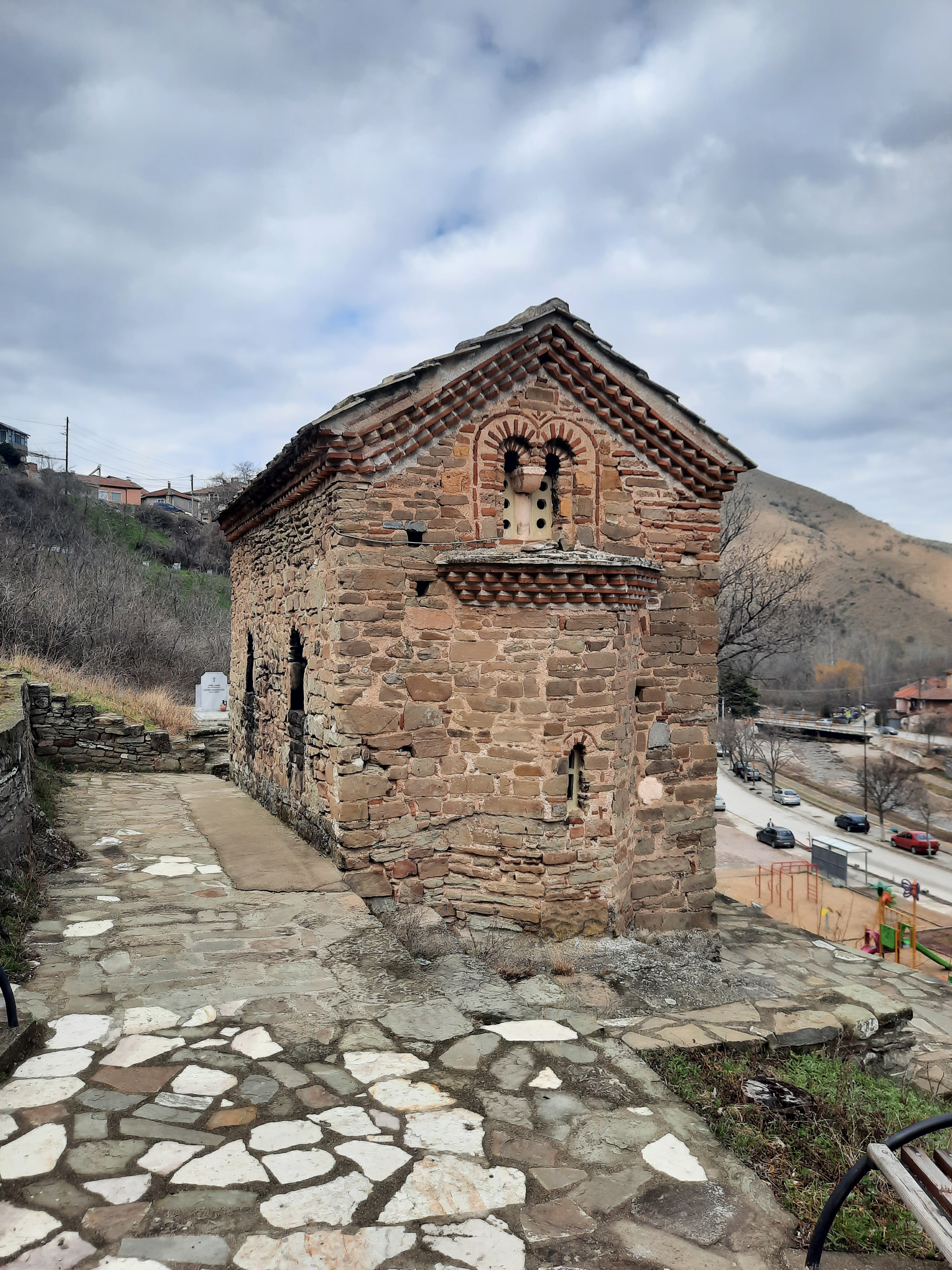
The apse in 2022

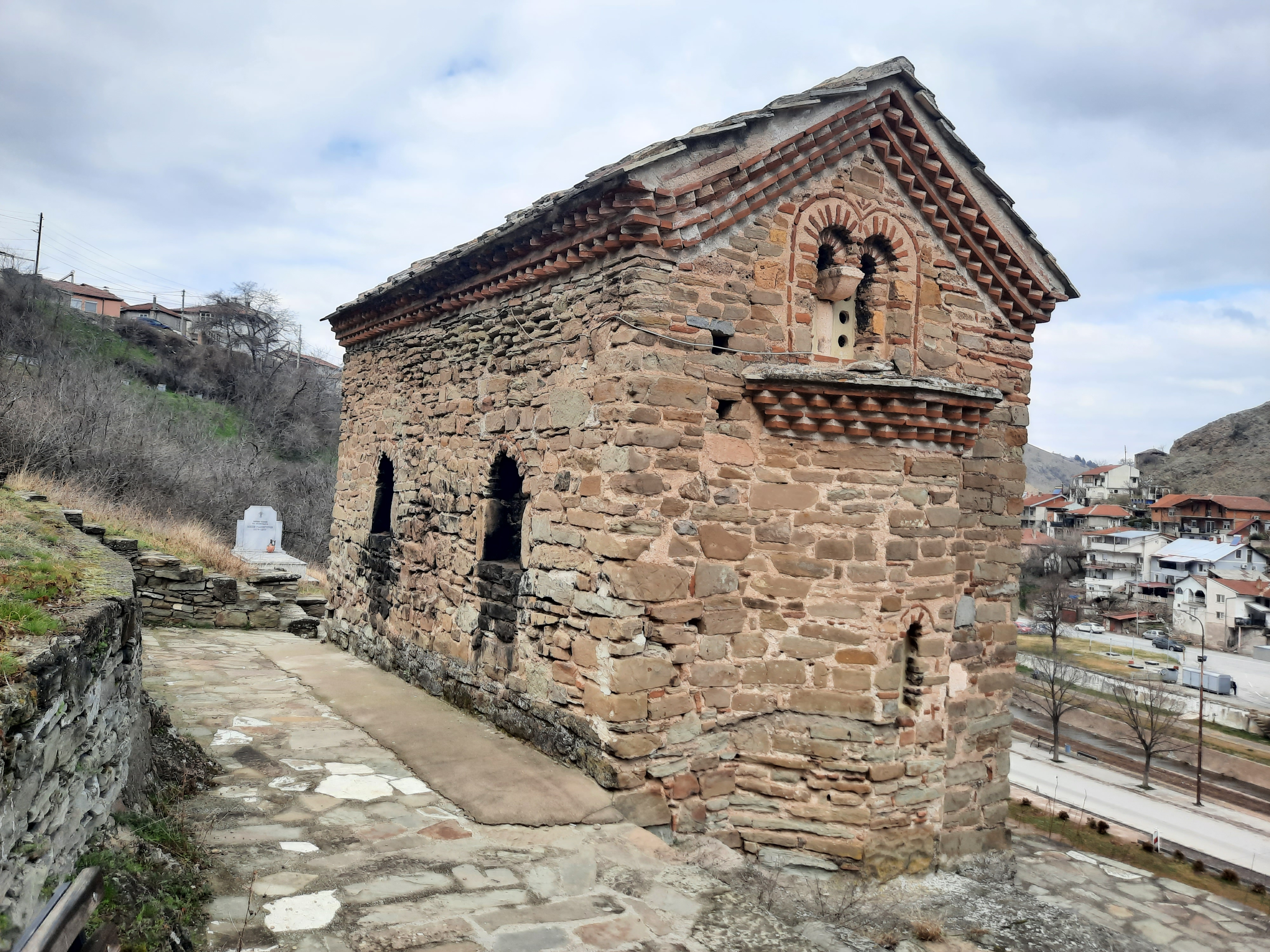
The southern wall and the apse

== See also ==
- Dormition of the Theotokos Church - the seat of Novo Selo Parish and a cultural heritage site
- Saint John the Baptist Church - a cultural heritage site
- Holy Trinity Church - the cemetery church and a cultural heritage site
- Novo Selo School - the building of the former school and the present seat of the Rectorate of the Goce Delčev University. It is also a cultural heritage site
