= Dormition of the Theotokos Church, Novo Selo, Štip =

Dormition of the Theotokos Church
- Црква „Успение на Пресвета Богородица“
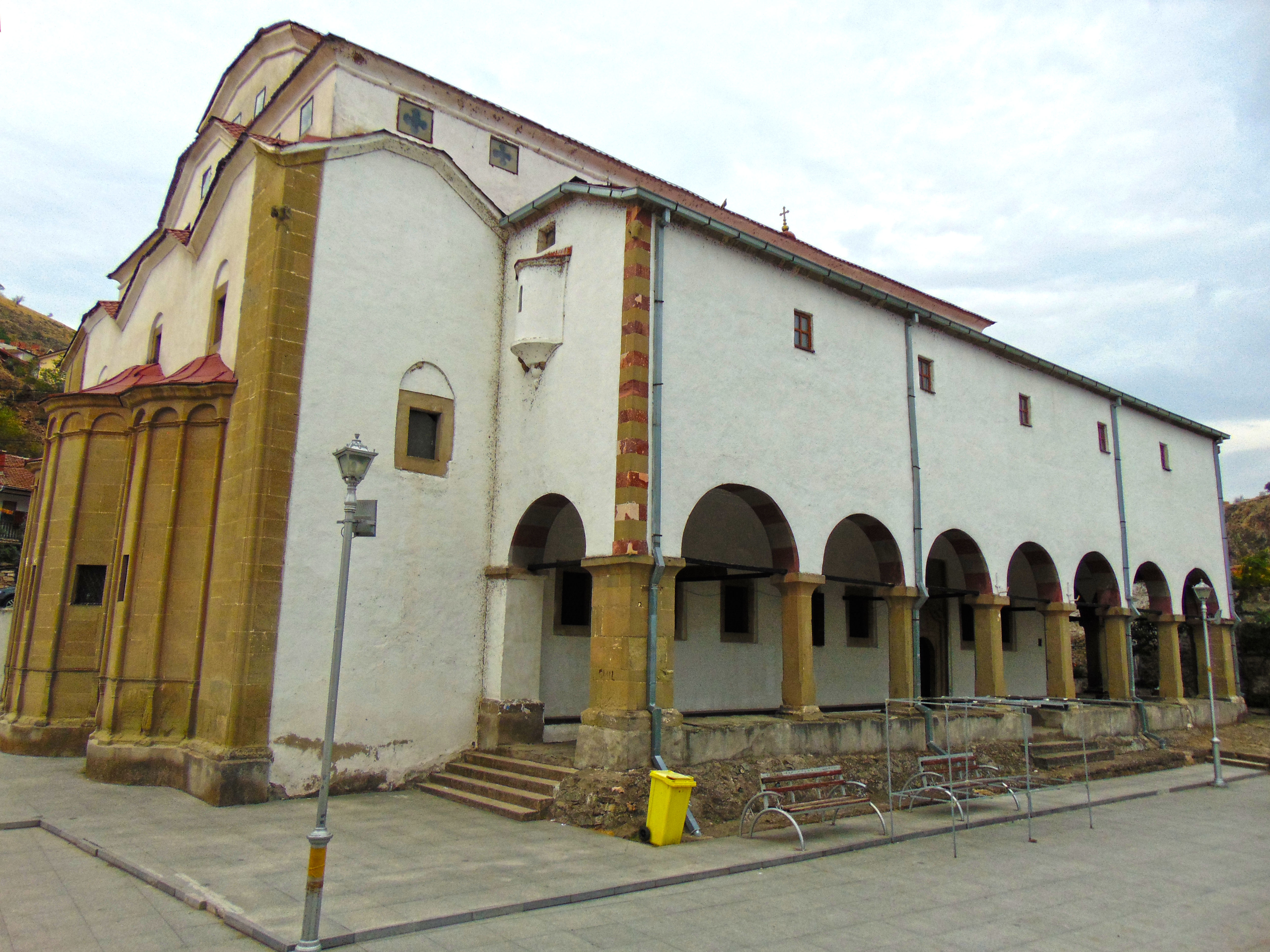
- The church in 2021
- Dormition of the Theotokos Church
- 41.736076°N 22.182108°E
- Country: North Macedonia
- Denomination: Eastern Orthodox; Macedonian Orthodox Church
- Website: www.bregalnickaeparhija.org.mk

History
- Status: open
- Dedication: Dormition of the Mother of God

Architecture
- Years built: 14
- Groundbreaking: 1836
- Completed: 1850

Administration
- Diocese: Bregalnica Diocese
- Parish: Novo Selo Parish

The Dormition of the Theotokos Church is a Macedonian Orthodox church in the neighbourhood of Novo Selo, Štip. The church is the seat of the Novo Selo Parish. The church is registered as a Cultural Heritage of North Macedonia.

== History ==
The church began construction in 1836 and was completed in 1850. It was built by the builder Andrey Damyanov with his group of brothers and is a large three-nave basilica with spacious galleries on the first floor. The icons of the iconostasis are from the same period, made by painter Stanislav Dospevski, Stanilov, Vangelov, Krste zograf, Teodosie, Dimitar Papradiški, Hristo from Samokov, Zahari Zograf, and the frescoes on the domes are presumed to have been made in the same period. The depth of the iconostasis, the canopy, the royal doors and the bishop's throne were made in the same period by Nikola Damyanov. There is no information when and by which hierarch she was consecrated.

After the construction, services began in the Church Slavonic language. Later, Bulgarian Exarchate school was built next to the church. During the First World War, the bodies of 19 Bulgarian officers and soldiers killed during the Battle of Krivolak were buried in the churchyard, including that of Hristo Chernopeev. Later the graves of the soldiers were obliterated.

== Gallery ==
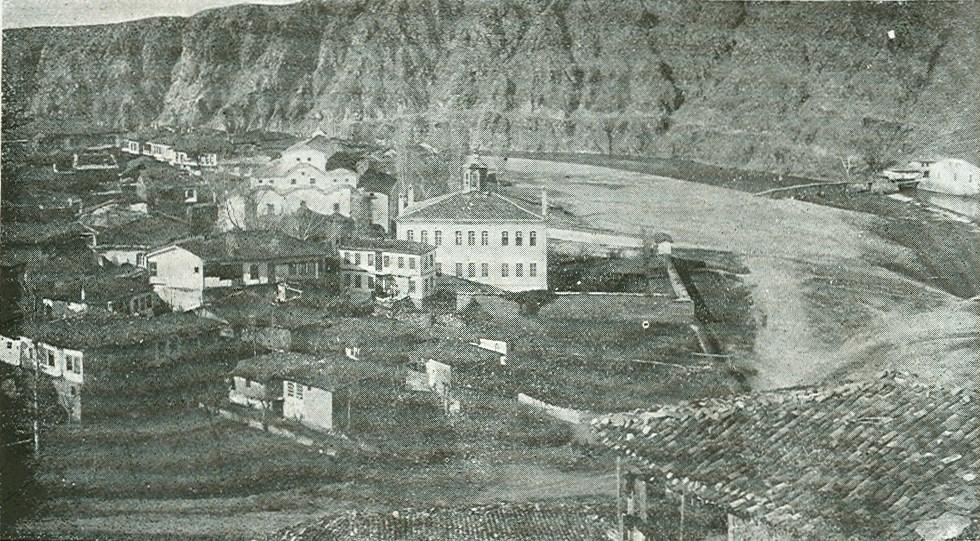
The Church and the School in the beginning of the 20th century

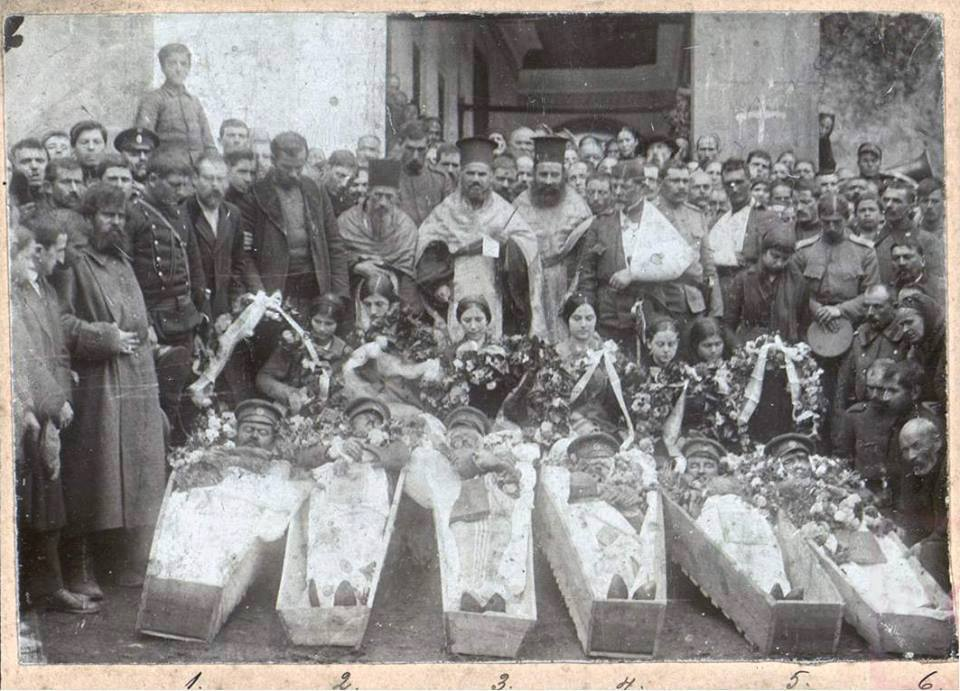
Funeral of Bulgarian officers killed at Krivolak in the churchyard.

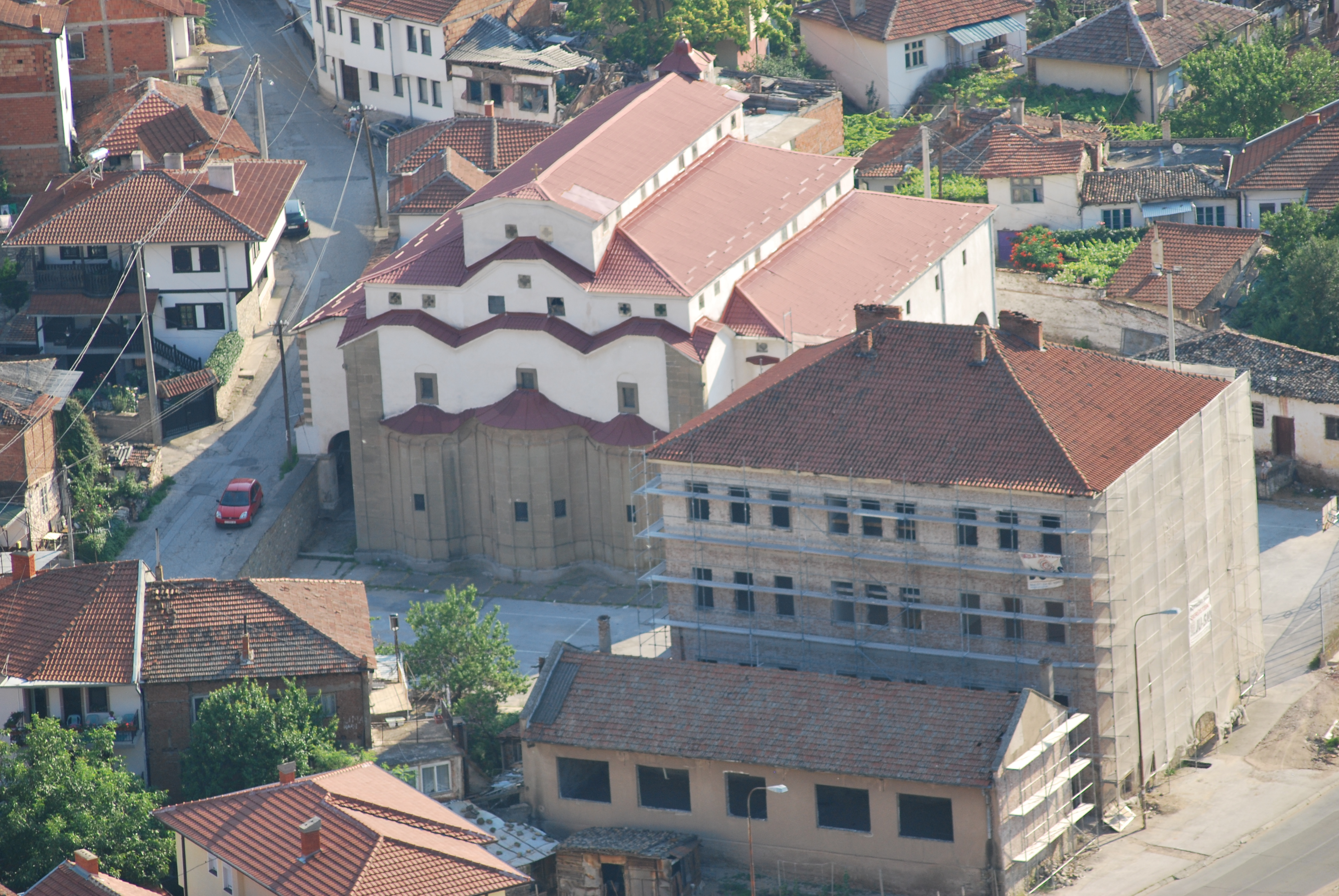
View of the church from the Štip Fortress

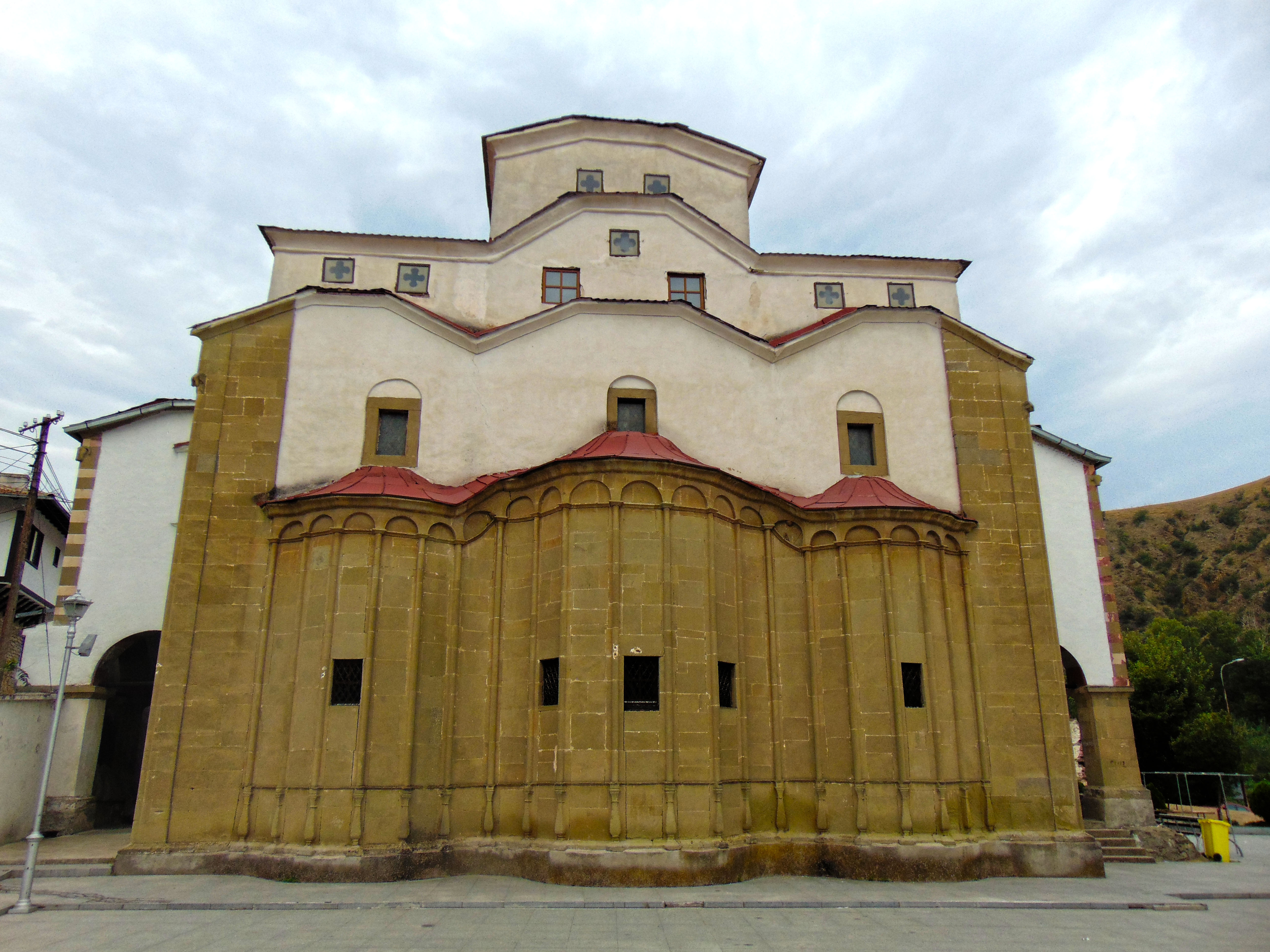
The apse

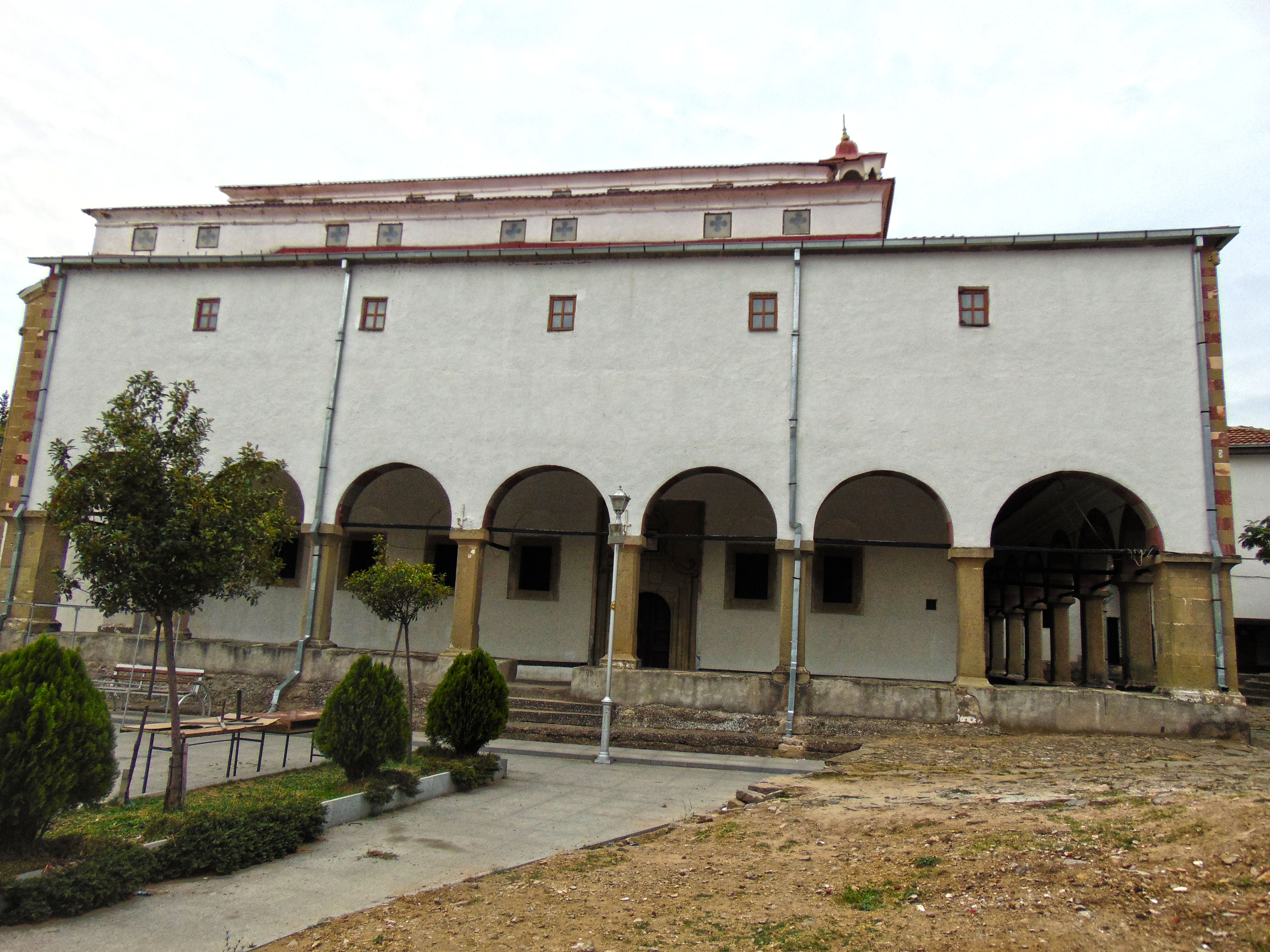
The northern side

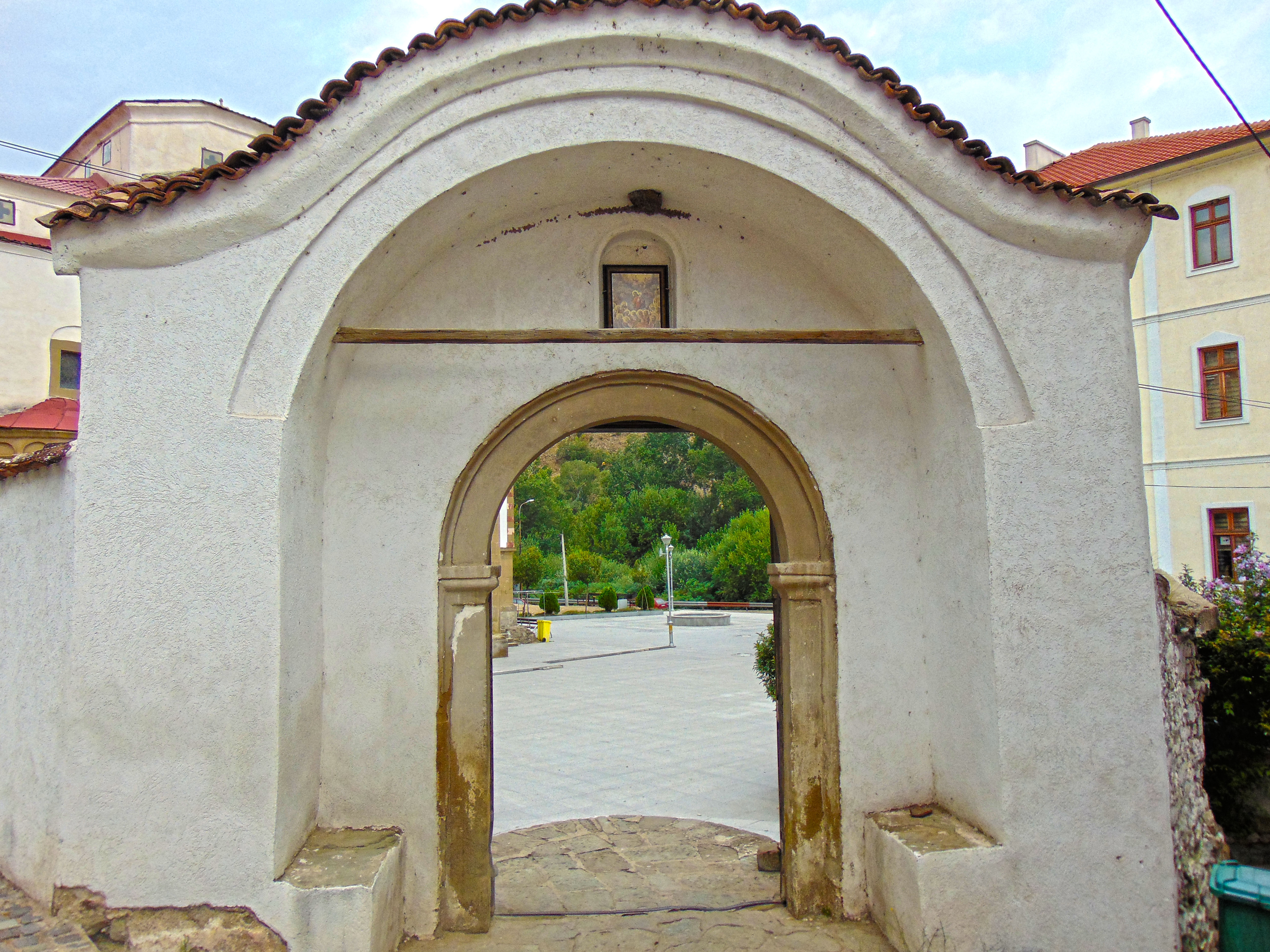
The yard portal

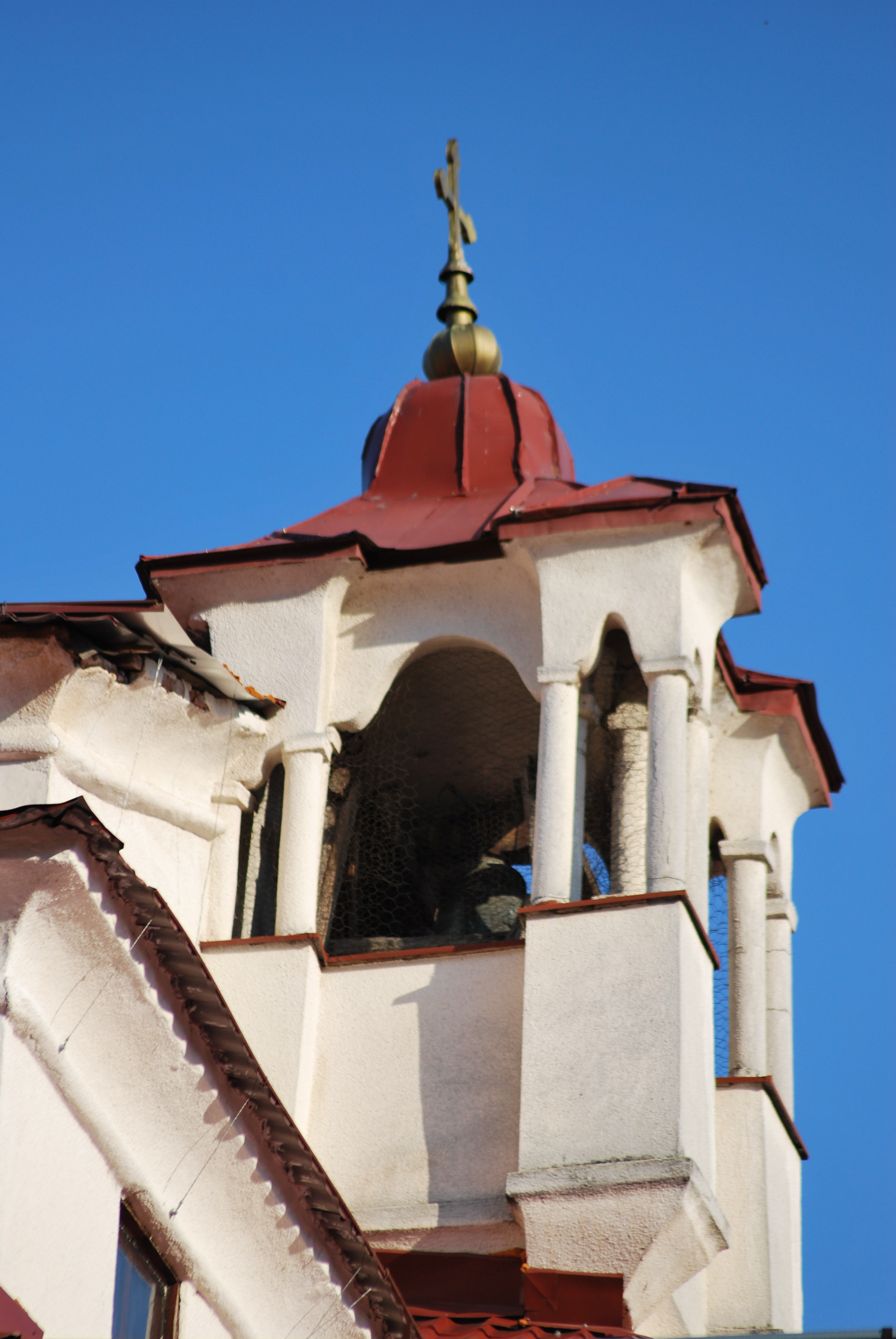
The bell tower

== See also ==
- Novo Selo School – the building of the former school and the present seat of the Rectorate of the Goce Delčev University. It is also a cultural heritage site
- Holy Trinity Church – the cemetery church and a cultural heritage site
- Ascension of Christ Church – a cultural heritage site
- Saint John the Baptist Church – a cultural heritage site
