= Holy Trinity Church, Novo Selo, Štip =

Holy Trinity Church
- Црква „Св. Троица“
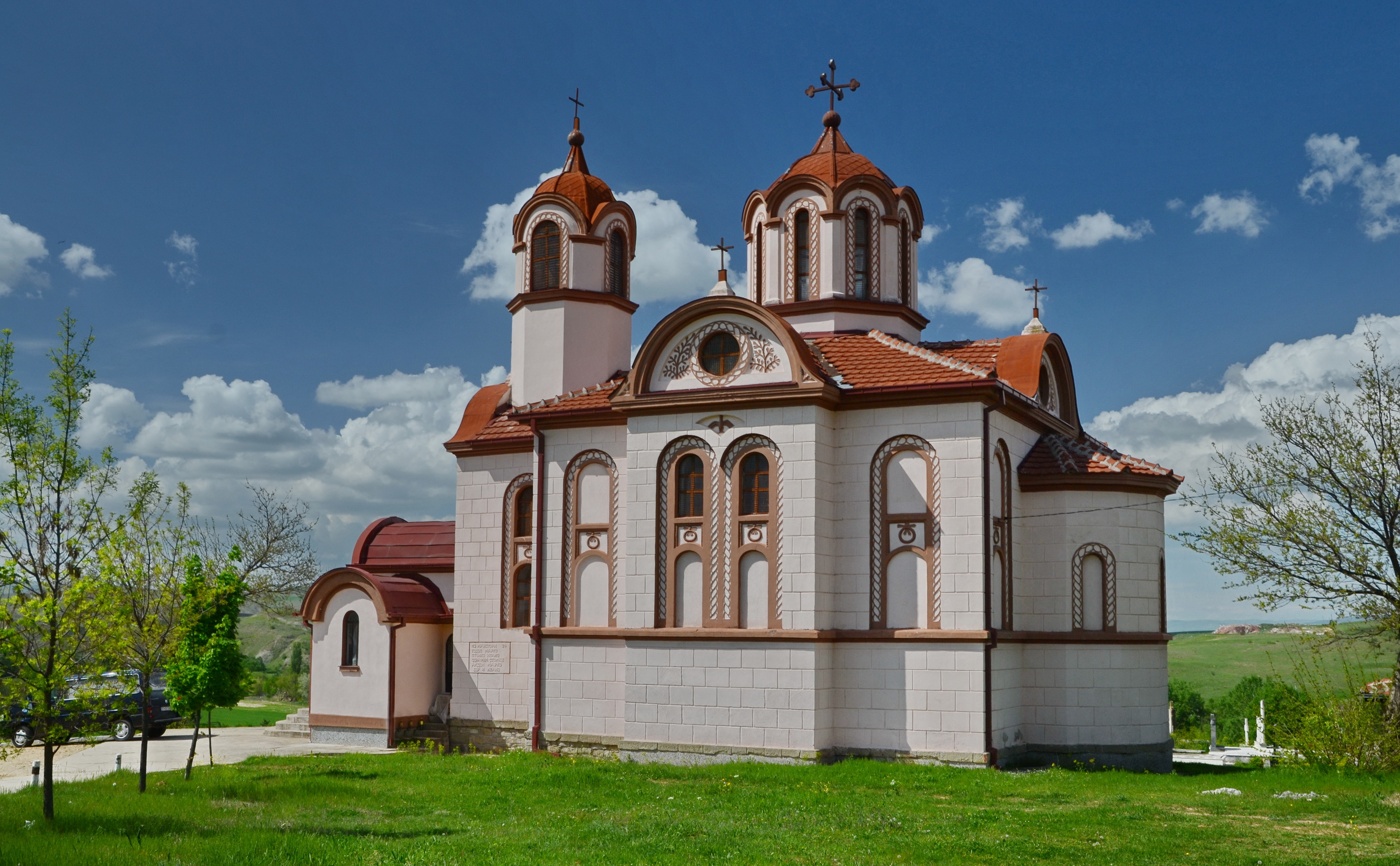
- The church in 2016
- Holy Trinity Church
- 41.729667°N 22.175167°E
- Country: North Macedonia
- Denomination: Eastern Orthodox; Macedonian Orthodox Church
- Website: www.bregalnickaeparhija.org.mk

History
- Status: open
- Founded: 1925
- Dedication: Holy Trinity
- Dedicated: 1925

Architecture
- Years built: 3
- Groundbreaking: 1922
- Completed: 1925

Administration
- Diocese: Bregalnica Diocese
- Parish: Novo Selo Parish

The Holy Trinity Church is a Macedonian Orthodox cemetery church in the neighbourhood of Novo Selo, Štip. The church is registered as a Cultural Heritage of North Macedonia.

== History ==
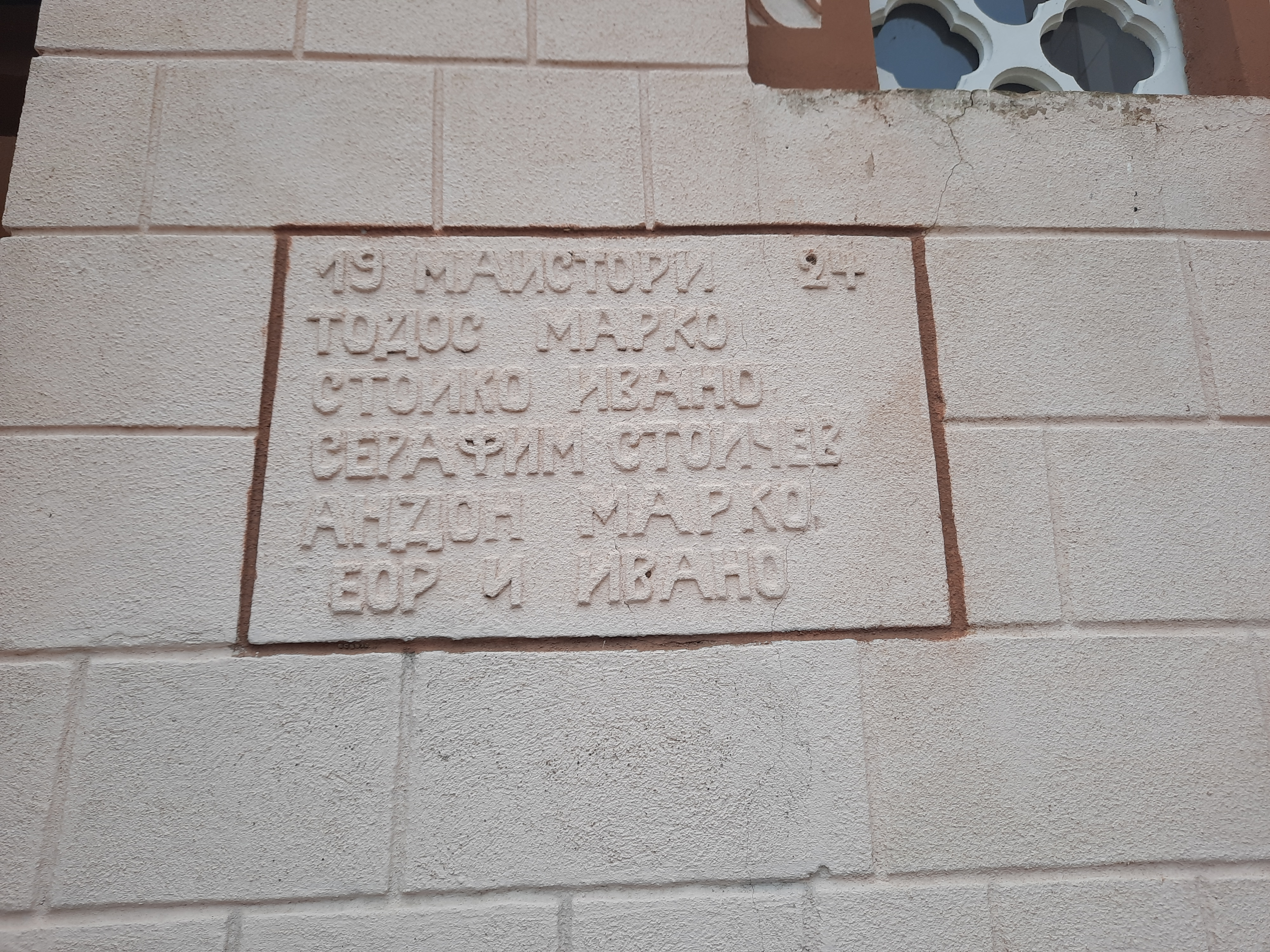
The dedication to the south wall, which lists the actual builders.

It was built in the period 1922 to 1925. It was consecrated in 1925, but there is no information from whom. The church is a founding work of Todor Čepreganov from Štip.

== Gallery ==
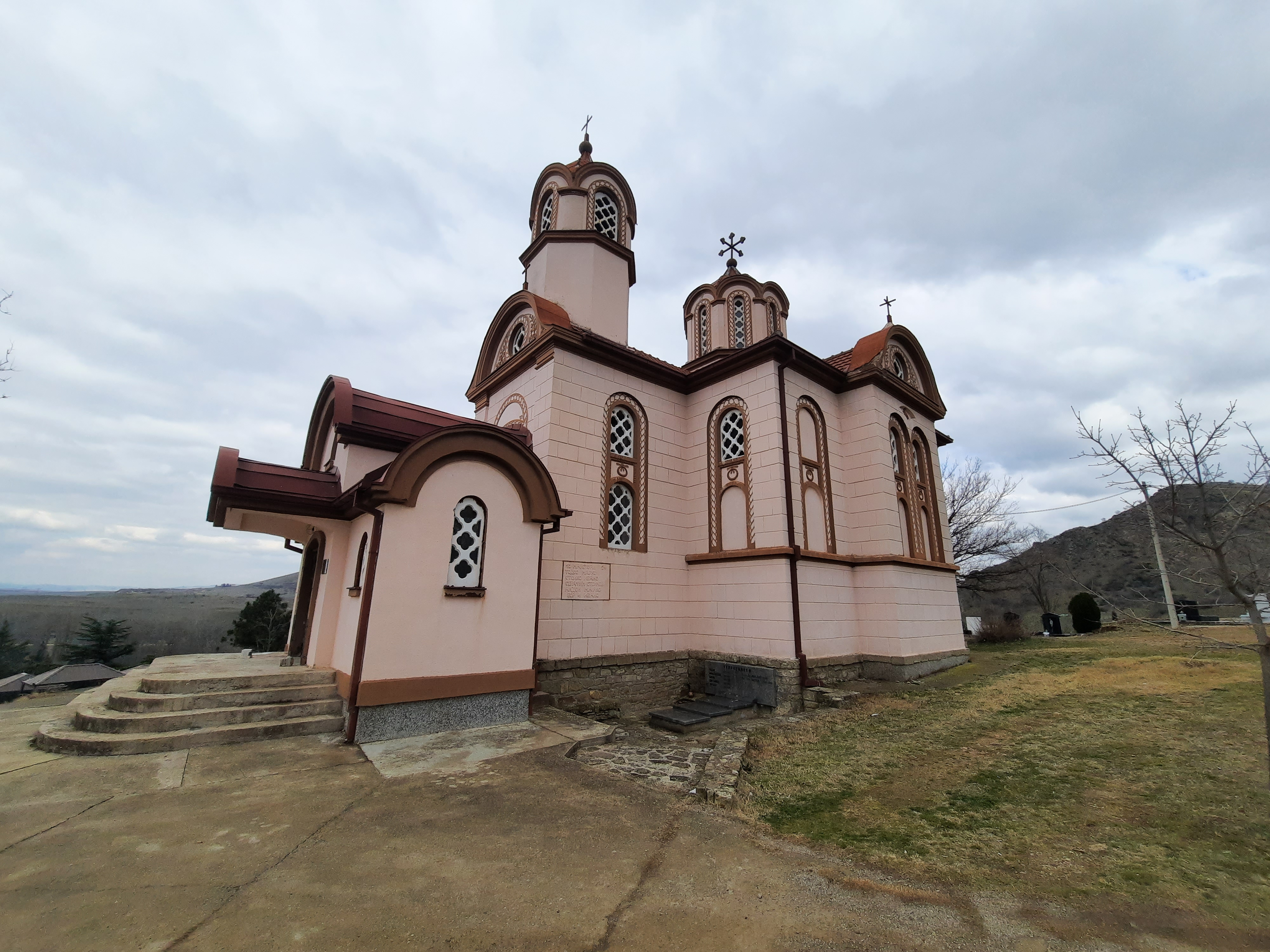
The church from up close

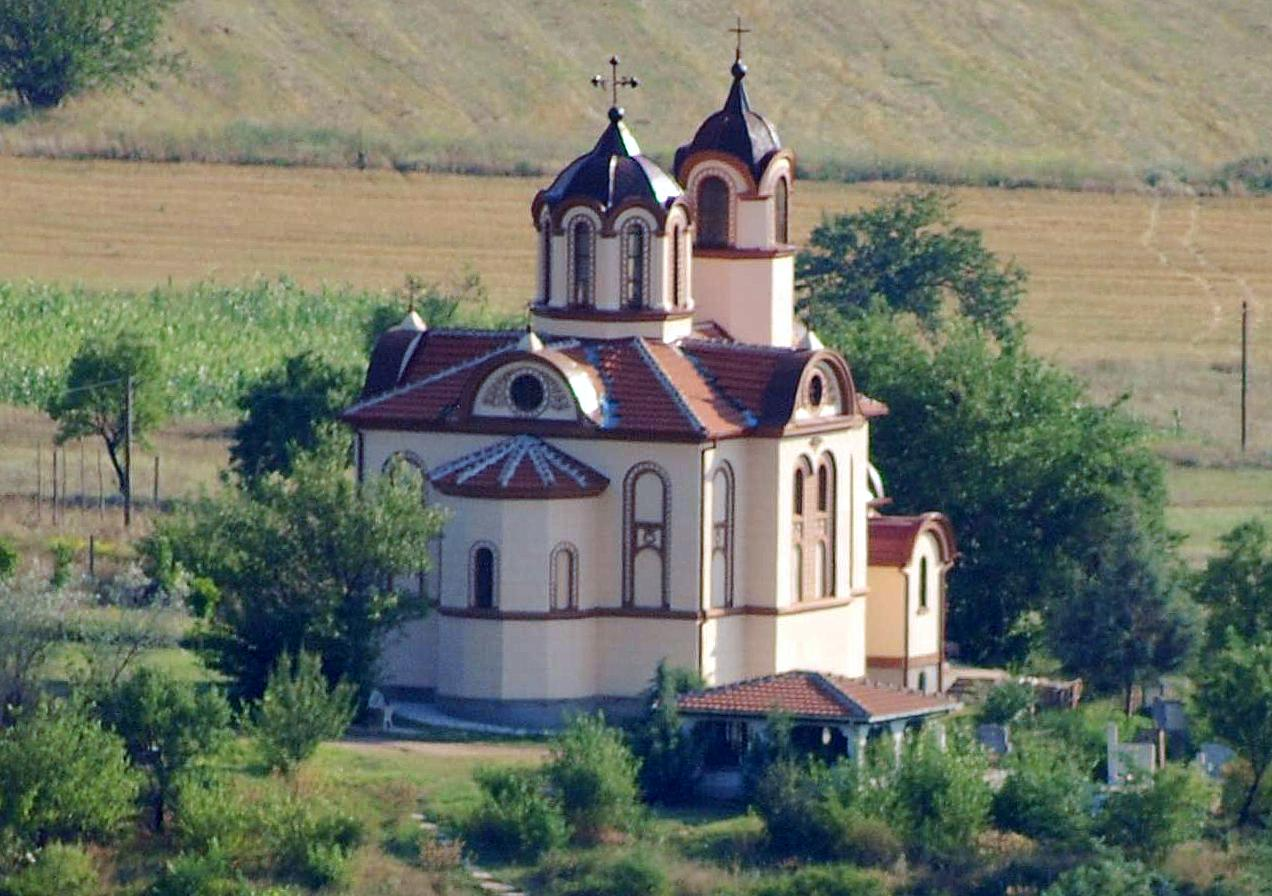
View of the church from the Štip Fortress

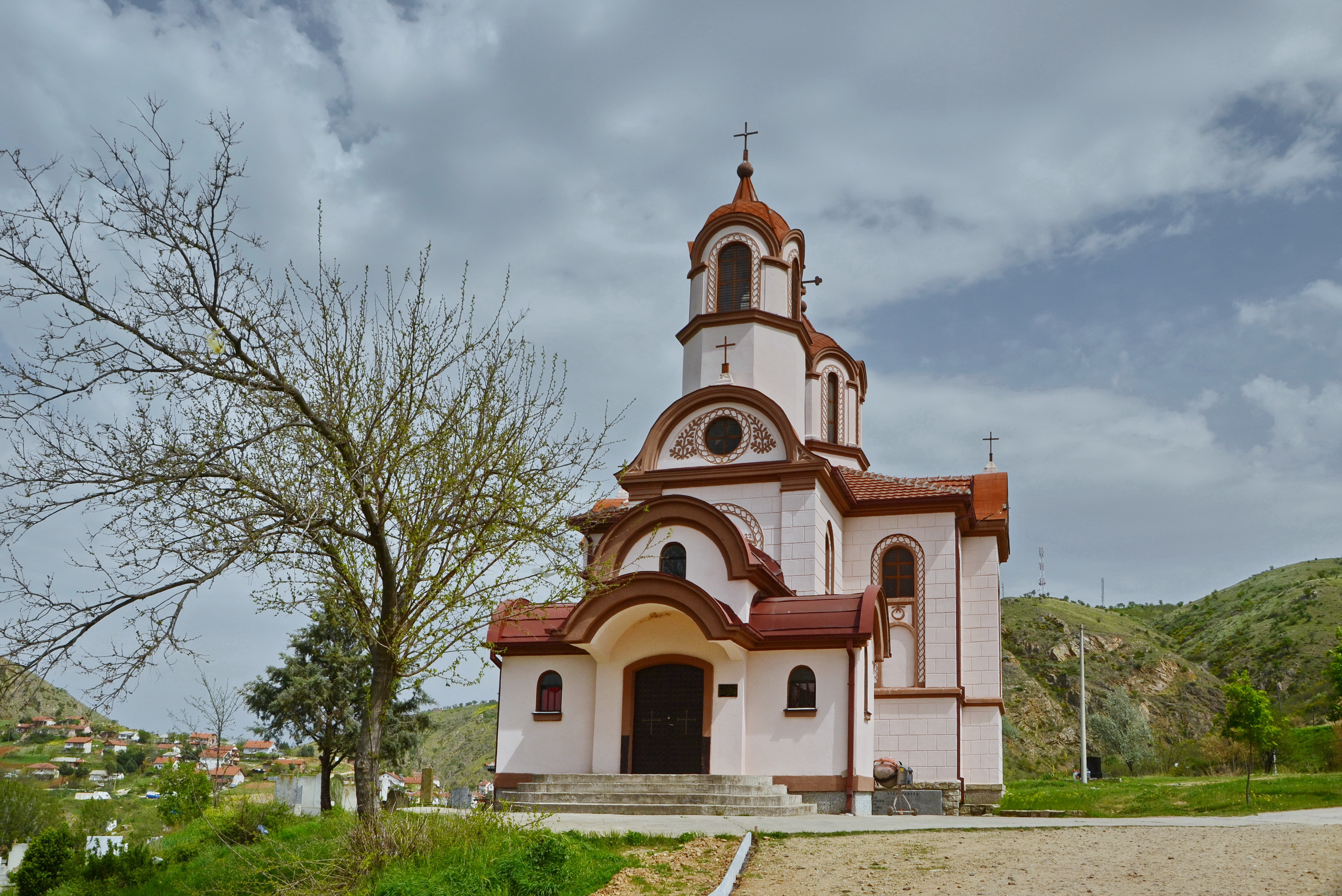
A western view of the church

== See also ==
- Jewish Cemetery - a cultural heritage site
- Dormition of the Theotokos Church - the seat of Novo Selo Parish and a cultural heritage site
- Ascension of Christ Church - a cultural heritage site
- Saint John the Baptist Church - a cultural heritage site
