= Goce Delčev University of Štip =

Public university in North Macedonia

- Универзитет Гоце Делчев - Штип
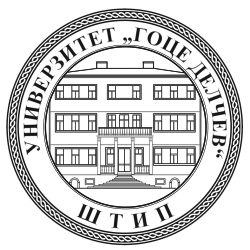
- Type: Public
- Established: 27 March 2007; 19 years ago
- Affiliations: EUA
- Rector: Prof. Dejan Mirakovski, PhD
- Faculty: 200+
- Administrative staff: 300+
- Students: 8,237 (2018–19)
- Location: Štip, Republic of North Macedonia; 41°44′13″N 22°11′26″E
- Campus: Urban
- Website: www.ugd.edu.mk

University rankings

Regional – Overall
- QS Emerging Europe and Central Asia: 251-300 (2022)

The Goce Delčev University of Štip (Macedonian: Универзитет Гоце Делчев Штип, romanized: Univerzitet Goce Delchev Shtip; abbr. UGD) is a public university in North Macedonia. Founded in 2007, the university has twelve faculties and three academies (as of July 2019). As of the 2018–19 school year, a total of 8,237 students were enrolled at the university. It is named in honour of the revolutionary Goce Delčev.

== History ==
On 27 March 2007, UGD was established by the Assembly of the Republic of North Macedonia. On 28 June 2007, the first Constitutive Session of the University Senate was held in the amphitheater of the Faculty of Education and the Faculty of Mining, Geology and Polytechnic. The University Senate unanimously appointed Professor Sasha Mitrev, PhD, as the first rector of the university in the presence of the State Secretary of Education Pero Stojanovski, a UGD home commission, and representatives from Štip.

In the first academic year, approximately 1,300 students were enrolled. UGD started with seven faculties and one higher-level vocational school as follows: Faculty of Law; Faculty of Economics; Faculty of Education; Faculty of Mining, Geology and Polytechnic; Faculty of Agriculture; Faculty of Computer Science and Information Technology; Faculty of Music; and Higher Medical School. Since the 2008–09 academic year, UGD has included six new faculties: Faculty of Medical Science, Faculty of Philology, Faculty of Electrical Engineering, Faculty of Mechanical Engineering, Faculty of Technology, and Faculty of Tourism and Business Logistics.

== Organization ==
UGD is divided into different sections, including academic faculties, administrative departments, and libraries. The university comprises 12 faculties and three academies, and it offers over 100 study programs in three cycles of studying. UGD has numerous university symbols, including a coat of arms, flag, insignia, gown, plaque, and anthem.

=== Campuses ===
UGD has four separate campuses. Campus 1 includes the Art Academy, Academy of Music, and Film Academy. Campus 2 includes the following faculties: Faculty of Agriculture, Faculty of Mechanical Engineering, Faculty of Electrical Engineering, Faculty of Technology, Faculty of Computer Science, and Faculty of Natural and Technical Sciences. Campus 3 includes the Faculty of Medical Sciences. Campus 4 includes the following faculties: Faculty of Economics, Faculty of Law, Faculty of Philology, Faculty of Educational Sciences, and Faculty of Tourism and Business Logistics.

=== Centers and laboratories ===
UGD has several centers, including the University Sports Center, the University Cultural Center, the Interuniversity Cooperation Center, the Public Relation Center, the Lifelong Learning Center, the E-learning Center, the Quality Assurance Center, the IT-Center, and the Alumni Club.

UGD also has numerous research laboratories, including UNILAB, that focus on various topics, including electronic microscopy, food quality inspection, microscopic sample preparation, radio pharmacy, dental research, and computer security and digital forensics.

== Administration ==
=== Rectorate and University Senate ===
The Rectorate is a seat of UGD where the highest governing bodies of UGD are placed. It consists of the rector, vice-rectors, secretary general, and administrative departments that support the function of UGD's units.

The University Senate is the managing and professional body of UGD, and consists of representatives of UGD's units and student members. The Senate has the authority to elect the rector and vice-rectors. The rector presides over Senate sessions, and the vice-rectors participate in the Senate without the right to vote. The Senate passes the University Statute and decides on UGD's educational, scientific, artistic, and professional activities. The Senate also passes the study programmes of the faculties and defines the scientific and artistic fields of study.

=== Rector ===
The rector is a managing body of the university. The rector represents UGD and initiates cooperation with other universities in Northern Macedonia and abroad. The rector's board consists of the rector, the vice-rectors, deans of faculties, directors of Institutes and Higher Vocational Schools, and one representative of the Student Parliament. Although the secretary general is also a part of the rector's governing body, he or she does not have right to vote. As of July 2019, the current rector is Professor Дејан Мираковски, PhD.

As of July 2019, there were two vice-rectors. The vice-rector for Teaching and Students was Professor Mishko Djidrov, PhD, and the vice-rector for Development, Investments and Maintenance was Professor Dejan Mirakovski, PhD.

== Students ==
The status of a university student is obtained by enrolling in the undergraduate, postgraduate and doctoral studies at the faculties and the higher vocational institution at UGD. Prospective students must pass external and internal examinations within the state graduation exam in order to be accepted. The ranking of candidates is made by the enrollment commission. The student programmes of the university may not list the candidates who have less than 40 points obtained on all grounds.

Foreign students are recorded outside of the quotas and are set out of the competition. To be enrolled at UGD, foreign students must complete a four-year secondary education, obtain a decision for recognition of the secondary school diploma by the Macedonian Ministry of Education and Science, and acquire certificates for Macedonian. When applying, foreign applicants must submit verified certificates of secondary education, as well as validate certificates of all classes, a certified translation of birth certificate, proof of knowledge of the Macedonian (published by the university commission), and a certificate of health. Foreign applicants must report whether they are paying privately or using scholarships from their government. UGD offers a two-semester course in Macedonian for foreign students.

== Inter-university cooperation ==
UGD cooperates with numerous scientific and educational institutions in the country and abroad. Collaborations with universities abroad are realized within international university associations and networks, as well as bilateral agreements. UGD aims to establish cooperation for the development and expansion of scientific and professional experiences, scientific and technical cooperation with foreign and national higher-education and research institutions, and the exercise of other forms of international cooperation.

UGD is a member of the Erasmus scholarship network, which involves a foreign exchange or study-abroad program. Erasmus students can spend one or two semesters at one European university, where each student will have the opportunity to learn the language and culture of the country in which they reside. Exams that students take while staying abroad are recognized in accordance with the rules of the European Credit Transfer and Accumulation System.

== See also ==
- List of universities in the Republic of North Macedonia
- Štip
