= House on Krste Misirkov St. no. 8, Štip =

House on Krste Misirkov St. no. 8
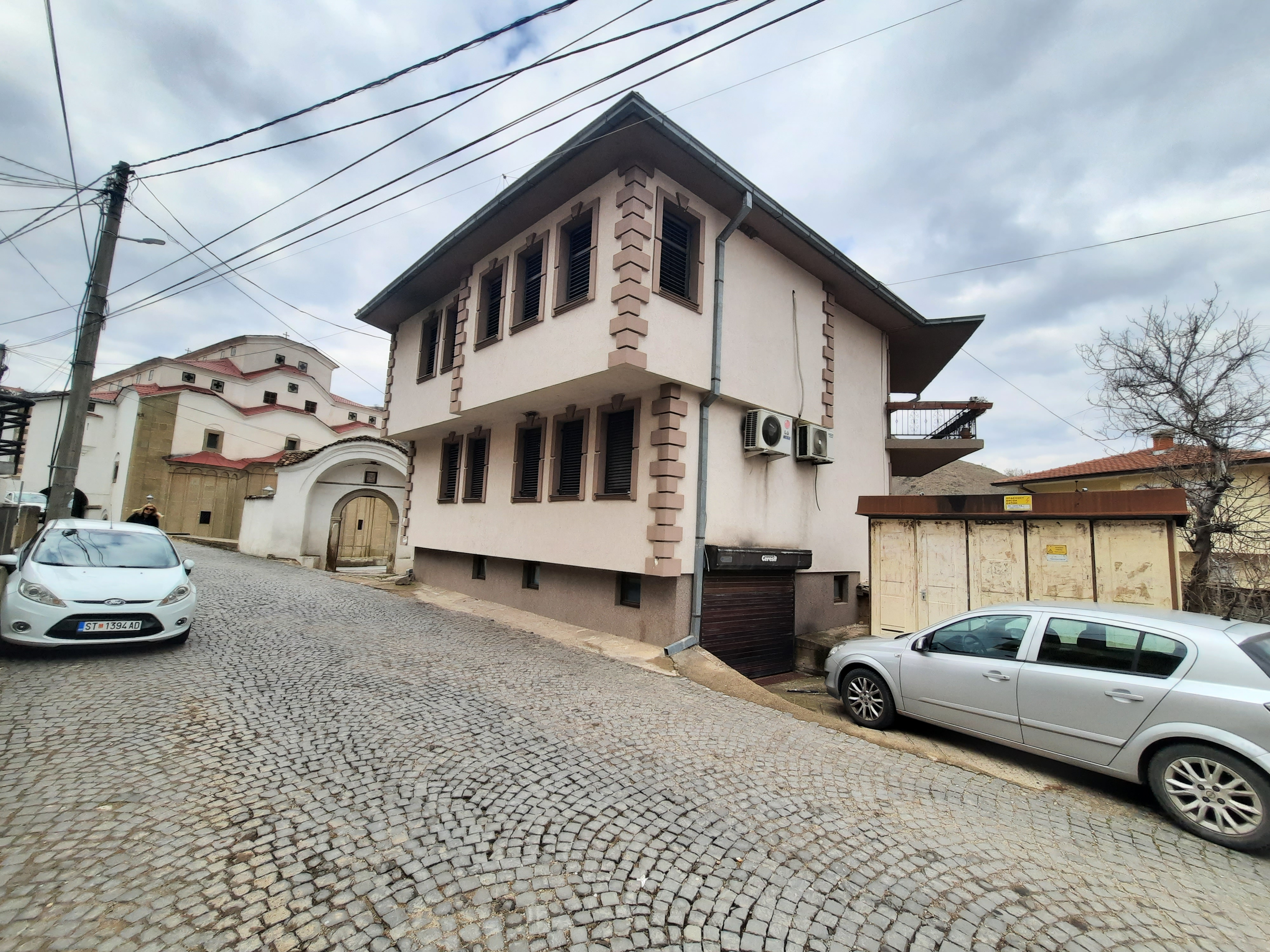
- The house in 2022
- Interactive map of the House on Krste Misirkov St. no. 8 area

General information
- Status: Monument of Culture
- Location: Krste Misirkov St. no. 8, Novo Selo, Štip, North Macedonia
- Coordinates: 41.73609721°N 22.1827059°E

Technical details
- Floor count: 2 + basement

The House on Krste Misirkov St. no. 8 is a house in the suburb of Novo Selo, Štip, North Macedonia. The house is registered as a Cultural Heritage of North Macedonia.

== Gallery ==
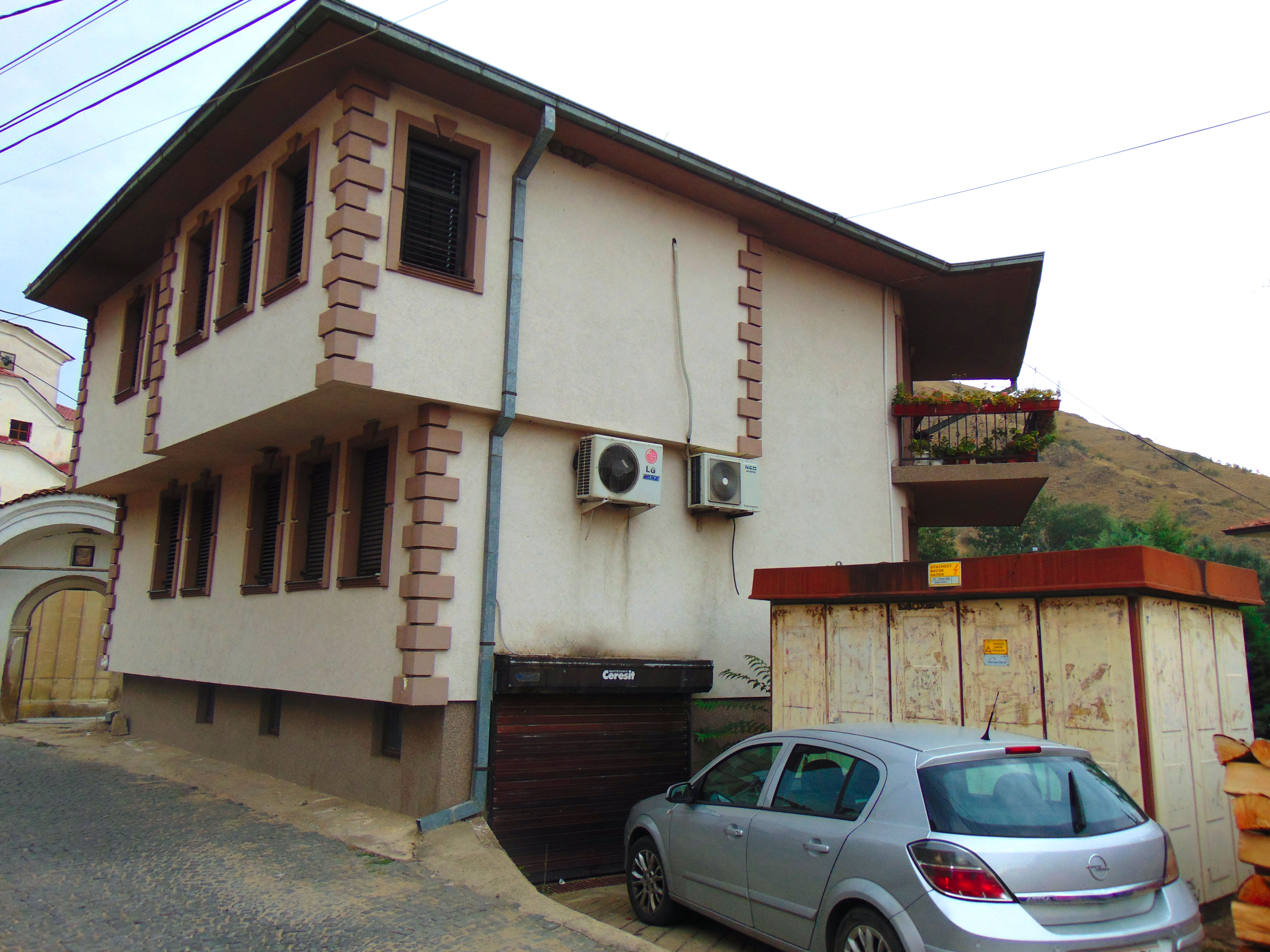

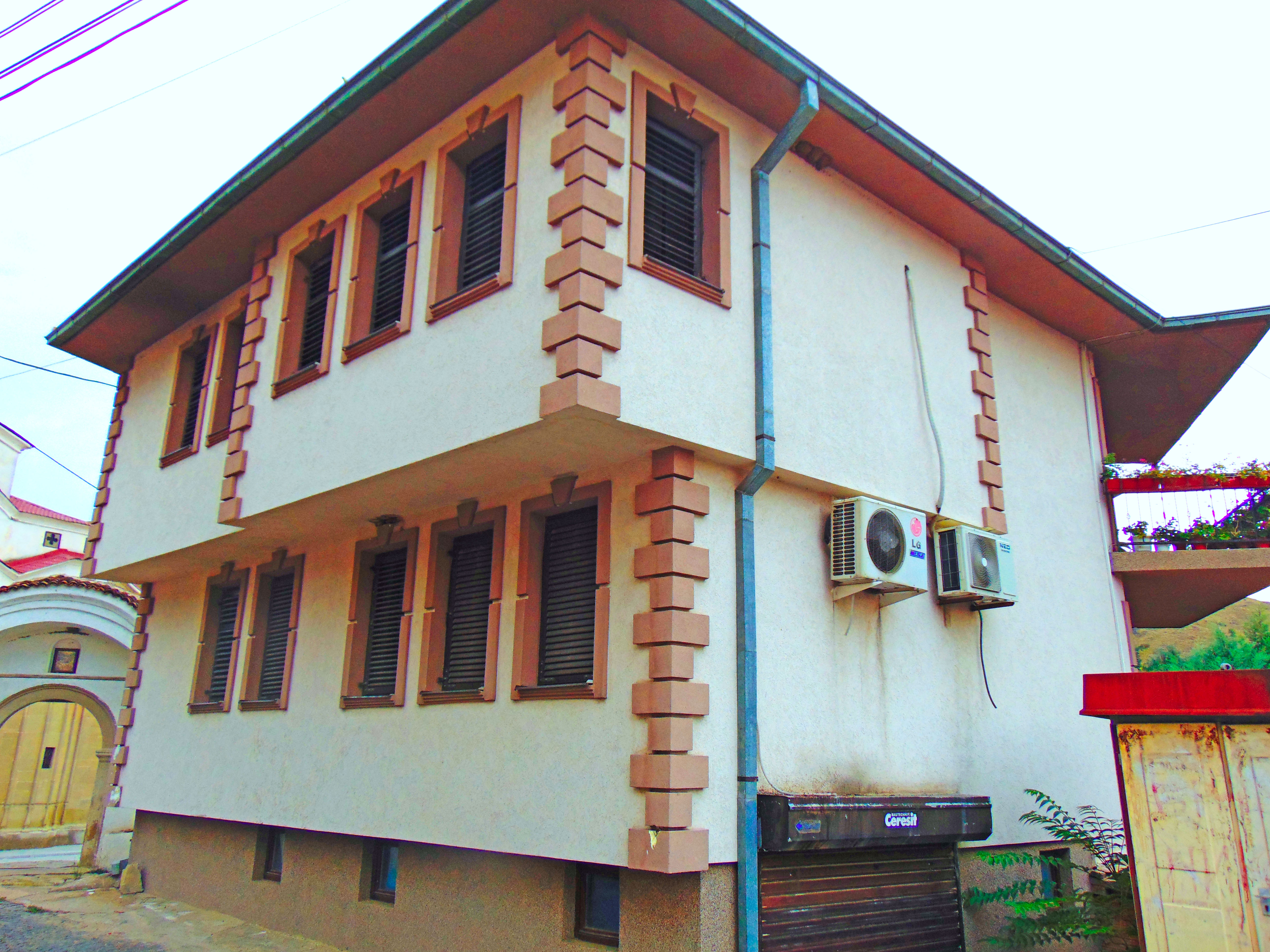

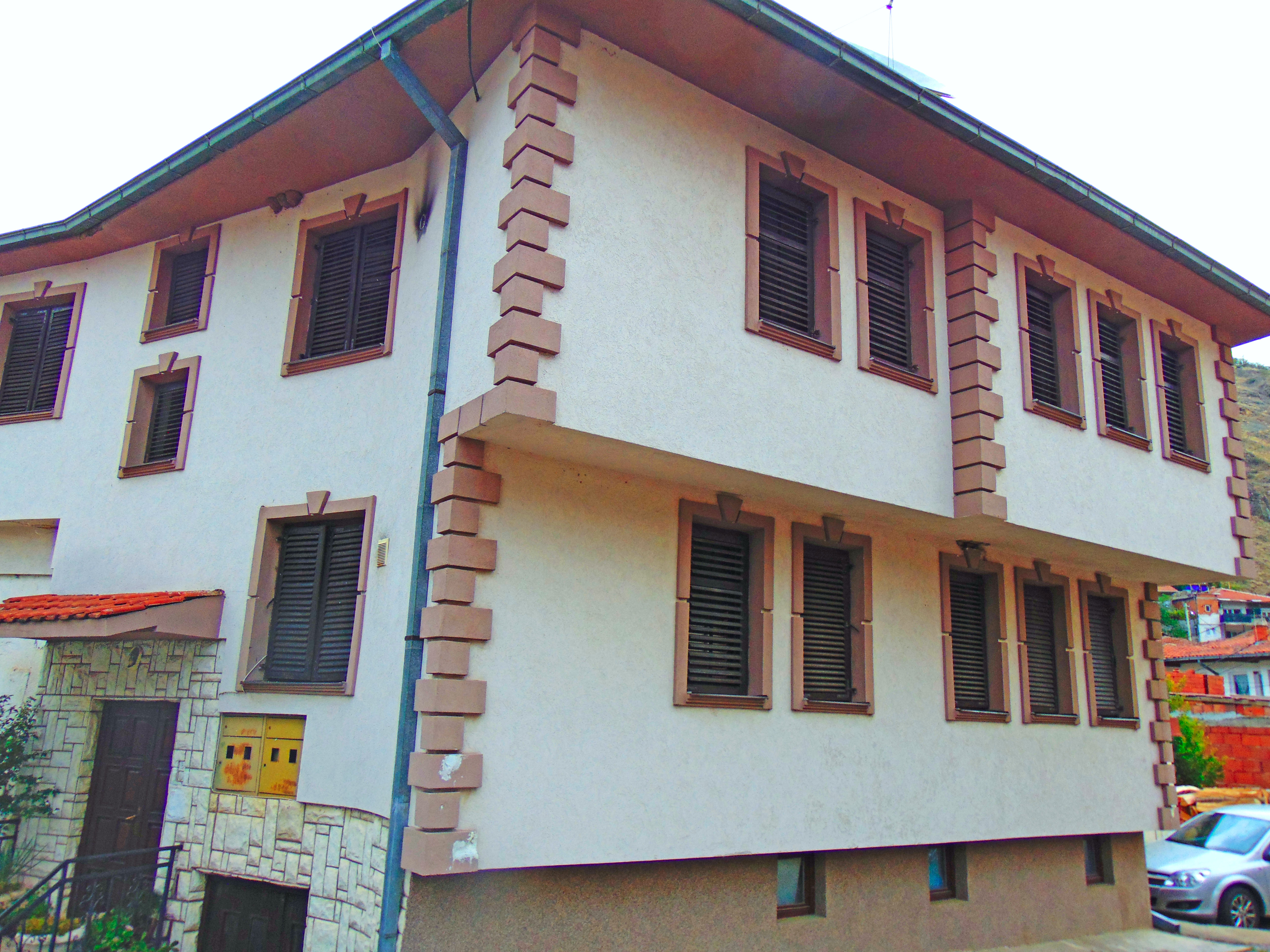

== See also ==
- House on Krste Misirkov St. no. 6, Štip - a cultural heritage site
- House on Krste Misirkov St. no. 45, Štip - a cultural heritage site
- Dormition of the Theotokos Church - the seat of Novo Selo Parish and a cultural heritage site
- Novo Selo School - the building of the former school and the present seat of the Rectorate of the Goce Delčev University. It is also a cultural heritage site
- Saint John the Baptist Church - a cultural heritage site
- Ascension of Christ Church - a cultural heritage site
